= 2022 Nevada elections =

- November 8, 2022

Elections were held in Nevada on November 8, 2022. On that date, the state held elections for Governor, Lieutenant Governor, Attorney General, Secretary of State, Treasurer, Controller, U.S. Senate, U.S. House of Representatives, Nevada Senate, Nevada Assembly, and various others. In addition, several measures were on the ballot.

== United States Senate ==
Incumbent Democratic U.S. Senator Catherine Cortez Masto was re-elected to a second term by a very narrow margin over Republican challenger Adam Laxalt.

== United States House of Representatives ==
All of Nevada's four seats in the United States House of Representatives were up for election in 2022, and all incumbents won re-election.

== Governor ==
Incumbent Democratic governor Steve Sisolak ran for a second term. He was defeated by Clark County Sheriff Joe Lombardo.

== Lieutenant governor ==
Incumbent Democratic lieutenant governor Lisa Cano Burkhead sought a first full term. She was defeated by Las Vegas City Council member Stavros Anthony.

== Attorney general ==
Incumbent Democratic attorney general Aaron D. Ford ran for a second term. He defeated attorney Sigal Chattah.

== Secretary of state ==
Incumbent Republican Barbara Cegavske was term-limited and could not seek a third term. Former Harry Reid staffer Cisco Aguilar defeated former Assemblyman Jim Marchant.

== State controller ==
Incumbent Democrat Catherine Byrne did not seek reelection. Republican Andy Matthews defeated Democrat Ellen Spiegel.

== State treasurer ==
Incumbent Democrat Zach Conine sought a second term. He defeated former Las Vegas City Councilwoman, Michele Fiore.

== State legislature ==
Elections were held to half of the seats in the Nevada Senate and all of the seats in the Nevada Assembly. The Democratic Party held a majority in both houses.

== Judiciary ==
=== Supreme Court ===
Two seats of the Nevada Supreme Court were up for election. Justices serve six-year terms.

==== Seat A ====
2022 Nevada Supreme Court Seat A election
Candidate	Linda M. Bell	None of these candidates
Party	Nonpartisan
Popular vote	666,535	211,792
Percentage	75.9%	24.1%
- Bell: 60–70% 70–80%
Nevada Supreme Court Justice before election
James Hardesty
Nonpartisan
Elected Nevada Supreme Court Justice
Linda M. Bell
Nonpartisan

Incumbent justice James Hardesty announced he would retire and not seek re-election. Linda Bell, Chief Judge of the Eight Judicial District Court, was the only candidate to file, and was elected unopposed.

2022 Nevada Supreme Court election (Seat A)
Party	Candidate	Votes	%
Nonpartisan	Linda M. Bell	666,535	75.89%
None of These Candidates		211,792	24.11%
Total votes		878,327	100.0%

==== Seat E ====
2022 Nevada Supreme Court Seat E election
Candidate	Ron Parraguirre	None of these candidates
Party	Nonpartisan
Popular vote	651,496	222,899
Percentage	74.5%	25.5%
- Parraguirre: 60–70% 70–80%
Nevada Supreme Court Justice before election
Ron Parraguirre
Nonpartisan
Elected Nevada Supreme Court Justice
Ron Parraguirre
Nonpartisan

Justice Ron Parraguirre ran for re-election to another six-year term, and was reelected unopposed.

2022 Nevada Supreme Court election (Seat E)
Party	Candidate	Votes	%
Nonpartisan	Ron D. Parraguirre (incumbent)	651,496	74.51%
None of These Candidates		222,899	25.49%
Total votes		874,395	100.0%

=== Court of Appeals ===
All three seats on the Nevada Court of Appeals were up for election. Judges serve six-year terms.

==== Department 1 ====
Incumbent Judge Jerome Tao declined to seek re-election.

===== Candidates =====
- Rhonda Forsberg, Judge of the Eight Judicial District Court (Family Division, Department G)
- Deborah Westbrook, chief public defender of the Clark County Public Defender's Office

===== Results =====
2022 Nevada Court of Appeals election (Department 1)
Party	Candidate	Votes	%
Nonpartisan	Deborah Westbrook	459,818	51.44%
Nonpartisan	Rhonda Forsberg	222,586	24.90%
None of These Candidates		211,499	23.66%
Total votes		893,903	100.0%

==== Department 2 ====
Incumbent Judge Michael Gibbons was reelected unopposed.

2022 Nevada Court of Appeals election (Department 2)
Party	Candidate	Votes	%
Nonpartisan	Michael Gibbons (incumbent)	651,985	74.72%
None of These Candidates		220,597	25.49%
Total votes		872,582	100.0%

==== Department 3 ====
Incumbent Judge Bonnie Bulla was reelected unopposed.

2022 Nevada Court of Appeals election (Department 3)
Party	Candidate	Votes	%
Nonpartisan	Bonnie Bulla (incumbent)	639,507	73.54%
None of These Candidates		230,071	26.46%
Total votes		869,578	100.0%

== Ballot measures ==
Two ballot measures which would increase gaming and sales taxes and dedicate revenue to education were placed on the ballot after the Nevada Legislature chose to not act on them during the session. A Nevada Equal Rights Amendment which would prohibit discrimination based on an individual's race, color, creed, sex, sexual orientation, gender identity or expression, age, disability, ancestry or national origin was also placed on the ballot. The third ballot measure would replace both the primary and voting systems with top-five-based Ranked-choice voting system.

=== Equal Rights Amendment ===
==== Polling ====
Poll source	Date(s) administered	Sample size (Note: Key: A – all adults RV – registered voters LV – likely voters V – unclear)	Margin of error	For amendment	Against amendment	Undecided
OH Predictive Insights	September 20–29, 2022	741 (LV)	± 3.6%	62%	23%	15%
OH Predictive Insights	July 8–19, 2022	924 (RV)	± 3.2%	72%	13%	15%

==== Results ====
State Question 1
- November 8, 2022
- Equal Rights Amendment

Yes
90–100%
80–90%
70–80%
60–70%
50–60%
No
90–100%
80–90%
70–80%
60–70%
50–60%
Other
Tie
No data

State Question 1
Candidate	Votes	%
Yes	580,022	58.63%
No	409,228	41.37%
Total votes	989,250	100.00%

=== Minimum Wage Amendment ===
==== Polling ====
Poll source	Date(s) administered	Sample size	Margin of error	For amendment	Against amendment	Undecided
OH Predictive Insights	September 20–29, 2022	741 (LV)	± 3.6%	63%	29%	7%

==== Results ====
State Question 2
- November 8, 2022
- Minimum Wage Amendment

Yes
90–100%
80–90%
70–80%
60–70%
50–60%
No
90–100%
80–90%
70–80%
60–70%
50–60%
Other
Tie
No data

State Question 2
Candidate	Votes	%
Yes	545,828	55.18%
No	443,318	44.82%
Total votes	989,146	100.00%

=== Top-Five Ranked Choice Voting Initiative ===
==== Polling ====
Poll source	Date(s) administered	Sample size	Margin of error	For initiative	Against initiative	Undecided
OH Predictive Insights	September 20–29, 2022	741 (LV)	± 3.6%	38%	40%	20%
OH Predictive Insights	July 8–19, 2022	924 (RV)	± 3.2%	42%	27%	32%

==== Results ====
State Question 3
- November 8, 2022
- Top Five Ranked Choice Voting Initiative

Yes
90–100%
80–90%
70–80%
60–70%
50–60%
No
90–100%
80–90%
70–80%
60–70%
50–60%
Other
Tie
No data

State Question 3
Candidate	Votes	%
Yes	524,868	52.94%
No	466,635	47.06%
Total votes	991,503	100.00%
