= 2016 Nevada elections =

- November 8, 2016
- Registered: 1,467,263
- Turnout: 76.7%

Elections were held in Nevada on November 8, 2016. On that date, the state held elections for U.S. President, U.S. Senate, U.S. House of Representatives, Nevada Assembly, and various others. In addition, 11 of the 21 seats in the Nevada Senate were up for election, and several measures were on the ballot.

== United States Senate ==
Nevada's Class 3 Senate seat is up for election. Harry Reid retired at the end of his 5th term. Democrat Catherine Cortez Masto was elected to replace him.

== United States House of Representatives ==
All of Nevada's four seats in the United States House of Representatives were up for election in 2016. Democrats Dina Titus, Jacklyn Rosen and Ruben Kihuen, and Republican Mark Amodei were elected.

== State Legislature ==
=== Nevada Senate ===
Eleven out of twenty-one seats in the Nevada Senate were up for election in 2016. Seven of the seats were currently held by Democrats and four were held by Republicans. Republicans held a one-seat majority in the State Senate. Democrats flipped one Republican seat and held all of theirs, winning a slim majority.

=== Nevada Assembly ===
All 42 seats in the Nevada Assembly are up for election in 2016. Republicans currently hold 24 seats, Democrats currently hold 16 seats, Libertarians currently hold 1 seat, and there is one vacancy.

Election 2016
District	Close of Primary Registration	Democratic primary Candidates	June 14, 2016 Result	Republican primary Candidates	June 14, 2016 Result	Other Party Candidates	November 8, 2016 Result
District 1	D +17.35%	Daniele Monroe-Moreno	No Primary	Roger "Oz" Baum	674 (43.91%)		
District 1	D +17.35%	Daniele Monroe-Moreno	No Primary	Howard Brean			
District 1	D +17.35%	Daniele Monroe-Moreno	No Primary	Howard Brean	861 (56.09%)		
District 2	R +5.78%	Owen Carver	786 (35.37%)	John Hambrick (I)	1,703 (59.59%)		
District 2	R +5.78%	Garrett LeDuff	218 (9.81%	Clayton Kelly Hurst	1,155 (40.41%)		
District 2	R +5.78%	Ron Nelsen	769 (34.61%)	Clayton Kelly Hurst	1,155 (40.41%)		
District 2	R +5.78%	Joe Valdes	449 (20.21%)	Clayton Kelly Hurst	1,155 (40.41%)		
District 3	D +27.04%	Nelson Araujo (I)	No Primary	No Republican Challenger			Democratic Hold Araujo to be reelected
District 4	R +0.37%	Bert Lucas	1,106 (39.98%)	Melissa D. Laughter	447 (15.84%)		
District 4	R +0.37%	Earle Orr	392 (13.82%)	Richard McArthur	1,241 (43.98%)		
District 4	R +0.37%	John Piro	1,339 (47.2%)	Kenneth Rezendes	1,134 (40.18%)		
District 5	D +7.09%	Shannon Churchwell	304 (13.96%)	Tony Baca	944 (39.93)		
District 5	D +7.09%	Rory Martinez	898 (41.25%)	Artemus "Art" Ham	1,420 (60.07%)		
District 5	D +7.09%	Brittney Miller	975 (44.79)	Artemus "Art" Ham	1,420 (60.07%)		
District 6	D +46.22%	Valencia Burch	411 (14.77%)	Carlo Maffatt	No Primary		
District 6	D +46.22%	Arrick "Kerm" Foster	156 (5.61%)	Carlo Maffatt	No Primary		
District 6	D +46.22%	Macon Jackson	487 (17.51%)	Carlo Maffatt	No Primary		
District 6	D +46.22%	William McCurdy II	1,728 (62.11%)	Carlo Maffatt	No Primary		
District 7	D +36.89%	Dina Neal (I)	No Primary	Jennifer Fawzy	No Primary		
District 8	D +15.12%	Jason Frierson	No Primary	Norm Ross	No Primary	John Moore (I) (Lib.)	
District 9	D +7.71%	Steve Yeager	No Primary	David Gardner (I)	803 (45.52%)		
District 9	D +7.71%	Steve Yeager	No Primary	Minddie Lloyd	300 (17.01%)		
District 9	D +7.71%	Steve Yeager	No Primary	Diana Orrock	661 (37.47%)		
District 10	D +24.25%	Chris Brooks	1,468 (71.57%)	Shelly M. Shelton (I)	No Primary		
District 10	D +24.25%	German Castellanos	583 (28.43%)	Shelly M. Shelton (I)	No Primary		
District 11	D +36.17%	Olivia Diaz (I)	No Primary	No Republican Challenger			Democratic Hold Diaz to be reelected
District 12	D +14.62%	James Ohrenschall (I)	No Primary	Ron McGinnis	614 (31.95%)	Troy Ethan Warren (Lib.	
District 12	D +14.62%	James Ohrenschall (I)	No Primary	Mark Riggins	789 (41.05%)	Troy Ethan Warren (Lib.	
District 12	D +14.62%	James Ohrenschall (I)	No Primary	John Santacruz	163 (8.48%)	Troy Ethan Warren (Lib.	
District 12	D +14.62%	James Ohrenschall (I)	No Primary	Walter L. Seip II	356 (18.52%)	Troy Ethan Warren (Lib.	
District 13	R +6.09%	No Democratic Challenger		Paul Anderson (I)	1,738 (62.16%)		Republican Hold Anderson to be reelected
District 13	R +6.09%	No Democratic Challenger		Leonard Foster	349 (12.48%)		Republican Hold Anderson to be reelected
District 13	R +6.09%	No Democratic Challenger		Steve Sanson	709 (25.36%)		Republican Hold Anderson to be reelected
District 14	D +32.54%	Maggie Carlton (I)	No Primary	Melody Howard	389 (53.43%)		
District 14	D +32.54%	Maggie Carlton (I)	No Primary	Quay Simons	339 (46.57%)		
District 15	D +30.87%	Elliot Anderson (I)	1,731 (84.36%)	Stan Vaughn	No Primary		
District 15	D +30.87%	Lou Toomin	321 (15.64%)	Stan Vaughn	No Primary		
District 16	D +24.11%	Heidi Swank (I)	No Primary	No Republican Challenger		Edmund Uehling (Lib.)	
District 17	D +27%	Tyrone Thompson (I)	No Primary	Ronald Newsome	No Primary		
District 18	D +25.34%	Richard Carrillo (I)	1,194 (64.06%)	Christine DeCorte	595 (56.83%)		
District 18	D +25.34%	Erica Mosca	670 (35.94%)	Matt Sadler	452 (43.17%)		
District 19	R +3.68%	No Democratic Challenger		Chris Edwards (I)	1,960 (61.19%)		Republican Hold Edwards to be reelected
District 19	R +3.68%	No Democratic Challenger		Connie Foust	1,243 (38.81%)		Republican Hold Edwards to be reelected
District 20	D +18.25%	Ellen Spiegel (I)	1,876 (76.98%)	Carol Linton	No Primary		
District 20	D +18.25%	Darren Welsh	561 (23.02%)	Carol Linton	No Primary		
District 21	D +7.44%	Ozzie Fumo	1,423 (57.63%)	Derek Armstrong (I)	1,179 (55.25%)		
District 21	D +7.44%	Vinny Spotleson	854 (34.59%)	Blain K. Jones	955 (44.75%)		
District 21	D +7.44%	Ben Nakaima	192 (7.78%)	Blain K. Jones	955 (44.75%)		
District 22	R +6.44%	Luis Aguirre-Insua	1,286 (56.21%)	Richard Bunce	1,574 (44.41%)		
District 22	R +6.44%	Mark W. Isquith	1,002 (43.79%)	Keith Pickard	1,970 (55.59%)		
District 23	R +14.02%	Craig Jordahl	No Primary	Swadeep Nigam	1,529 (28.01%)		
District 23	R +14.02%	Craig Jordahl	No Primary	Melissa Woodbury (I)	3,929 (71.99%)		
District 24	D +23.18%	Amber Joiner (I)	No Primary	Jim Riger, Sr.	No Primary		
District 25	R +9.99%	Allen "Eli" Smith	No Primary	Clint Jamison	619 (10.19%)		
District 25	R +9.99%	Allen "Eli" Smith	No Primary	Kime King	420 (6.92%)		
District 25	R +9.99%	Allen "Eli" Smith	No Primary	Jennifer Terhune	1,726 (28.43%)		
District 25	R +9.99%	Allen "Eli" Smith	No Primary	Jill Tolles	3,307 (54.46%)		
District 26	R +15.28%	No Democratic Challenger		Jason Guinasso	2,784 (44.67%)		Republican Hold Krasner to be elected
District 26	R +15.28%	No Democratic Challenger		Lisa Krasner	3,448 (55.33%)		Republican Hold Krasner to be elected
District 27	D +7.69%	Teresa Benitez-Thompson (I)	No Primary	Bonnie Weber	No Primary		
District 28	D +35.75%	Edgar Flores (I)	No Primary	Wesley Cornwell	No Primary		
District 29	D +3.45%	Lesley Elizabeth Cohen	No Primary	Amy L. Groves	1,142 (45.01%)		
District 29	D +3.45%	Lesley Elizabeth Cohen	No Primary	Stephen Silberkraus (I)	1,395 (54.99%)		
District 30	D +10.11%	Mike Sprinkle (I)	No Primary	Lauren Scott	No Primary		
District 31	R +6.08%	Richard "Skip" Daly	No Primary	Jill Dickman (I)	No Primary		
District 32	R +23.81%	No Democratic Challenger		Ira Hansen (I)	No Primary		Republican Hold
District 33	R +34.87%	No Democratic Challenger		John Ellison (I)	No Primary		Republican Hold
District 34	D +13.34%	Shannon Bilbray-Axelrod	1,199 (39.74%)	Marty Hagans	713 (37.99%)		
District 34	D +13.34%	Zachary Conine	1,126 (37.32%)	David LaBay	444 (23.65%)		
District 34	D +13.34%	Manny Garcia	692 (22.94%)	Matt Williams	720 (38.36%)		
District 35	D +5.81%	Justin Watkins	No Primary	Tom Blanchard	324 (18.5%)		
District 35	D +5.81%	Justin Watkins	No Primary	Benjamin Donlon	18 (1.03%)		
District 35	D +5.81%	Justin Watkins	No Primary	Raymond Joseph Giordano	46 (2.63%)		
District 35	D +5.81%	Justin Watkins	No Primary	Brent Jones (I)	712 (40.66%)		
District 35	D +5.81%	Justin Watkins	No Primary	Tiffany Jones	651 (37.18%)		
District 36	R +16.39%	No Democratic Challenger		James Oscarson (I)	1,988 (46.49%)	Dennis Hof (Lib.)	
District 36	R +16.39%	No Democratic Challenger		Rusty Stanberry	433 (10.13%)	Dennis Hof (Lib.)	
District 36	R +16.39%	No Democratic Challenger		Tina Trenner	1,855 (43.38%)	Dennis Hof (Lib.)	
District 37	R +0.64%	Sean Lyttle	No Primary	Jim Marchant	2,511 (62.51%)		
District 37	R +0.64%	Sean Lyttle	No Primary	Glenn Trowbridge (I)	1,506 (37.49%)		
District 38	R +29.65%	George Dini	No Primary	Robin Titus (I)	No Primary	Wendy "Rooster" Cochran (No Party)	
District 38	R +29.65%	George Dini	No Primary	Robin Titus (I)	No Primary	Justin Smith (IAP of Nevada)	
District 39	R +30.01%	No Democratic Challenger		Jim Wheeler (I)	No Primary	Alexander Dunn (No Party)	
District 40	R +16.77%	Michael Greedy	No Primary	Sam England	1,515 (26.02)	John Wagner (IAP of Nevada)	
District 40	R +16.77%	Michael Greedy	No Primary	Chris Forbush	1,050 (18.04%)	John Wagner (IAP of Nevada)	
District 40	R +16.77%	Michael Greedy	No Primary	Al Kramer	1,709 (29.35%)	John Wagner (IAP of Nevada)	
District 40	R +16.77%	Michael Greedy	No Primary	Philip "PK" O'Neill (I)	1,548 (26.59%	John Wagner (IAP of Nevada)	
District 41	D +7.54%	Paul Aizley	783 (44.11%)	Nick Phillips	934 (54.21%)		
District 41	D +7.54%	Sandra Jauregui	992 (55.89%)	Mary Rooney	789 (45.79%)		
District 42	D +22.97%	Irene Bustamante Adams (I)	No Primary	Howard Scheff	No Primary		

== State Judicial Branch ==
=== Supreme Court ===
District	Incumbent	Previous Terms	Candidates	Result
Seat A	James Hardesty	2004-2010; 2010-2016	James Hardesty	
Seat F	Ron Parraguirre	2004-2010; 2010-2016	Ron Parraguirre	

=== Appeals Court ===
District	Incumbent	Previous Terms	Candidates	Result
District 1	Jerry Tao	2014-2016	Jerry Tao; Neil Durrant	
District 2	Michael Gibbons	2014-2016	Michael Gibbons	
District 3	Abbi Silver	2014-2016	Abbi Silver	

== Petitions ==
=== Question 1: Background Checks for Gun Purchases ===
Results by county Yes: 50–60%; No: 90–100%; 80–90%; 70–80%; 60–70%; 50–60%

=== Question 2: Marijuana Legalization ===
Results by county Yes: 50–60%; No: 60–70%; 50–60%
