= Deborah Agosti =

American judge (born c. 1952)

Justice of the Nevada Supreme Court (Seat E)
- In office 1999–2005
- Preceded by: Charles E. Springer
- Succeeded by: Ron Parraguirre

Personal details
- Born: 1952 (age 73–74) Toledo, Ohio, U.S.
- Education: University of Toledo (BA, JD)

Deborah Ann Agosti (born c. 1952) is a former justice of the Supreme Court of Nevada from 1999 to 2005. She was one of the first one hundred women attorneys in Nevada.

== Early life and education ==
Agosti grew up in Toledo, Ohio and attended Central Catholic High School. She graduated from the University of Toledo with a Bachelor of Arts in 1973 and from the University of Toledo College of Law with a Juris Doctor in 1976.

== Career ==
Agosti served less than one year as a deputy public defender in Montgomery County, Ohio before moving to Nevada.

In Reno, Agosti worked for the Senior Citizens Legal Assistance Program from 1977 to 1979. She then worked as a deputy district attorney. Agosti was elected as the first female Justice of the Peace in Reno in 1983. In 1984, she was elected to the Second Judicial District Court in Washoe County and re-elected twice without opposition.

== Supreme Court ==
Agosti was elected to the Nevada Supreme Court in 1998 without opposition. She served on the Supreme Court until her term expired in 2005. After leaving the Supreme Court, she became a senior judge.

Near the end of her term, Agosti was criticized for writing an opinion that temporarily let the Nevada Legislature approve tax hikes without the mandatory two-thirds' supermajority.

Agosti cited health reasons for choosing not to run for re-election in 2004, although her announcement came two weeks after her retention score had dropped to 44 percent. Agosti was succeeded by Ron Parraguirre.

Political offices
Preceded by Charles E. Springer	Justice of the Supreme Court of Nevada; 1999–2005	Succeeded by Ron Parraguirre
