= Michael Cherry (judge) =

American judge

Chief Justice of the Nevada Supreme Court
- In office January 2, 2017 – January 1, 2018
- Preceded by: Ron Parraguirre
- Succeeded by: Michael L. Douglas
- In office May 7, 2012 – January 5, 2013
- Preceded by: Nancy Saitta
- Succeeded by: Kristina Pickering

Justice of the Nevada Supreme Court Seat C
- In office January 6, 2007 – January 7, 2019
- Preceded by: Robert E. Rose
- Succeeded by: Elissa F. Cadish

Personal details
- Born: 1944 (age 81–82)
- Education: University of Missouri, Columbia (BA); Washington University in St. Louis (JD)

Michael A. Cherry (born 1944) is a former justice of the Nevada Supreme Court. He was elected in 2006.

== Education ==
Cherry did his undergraduate studies at the University of Missouri and graduated in 1966. He earned his Juris Doctor degree from Washington University School of Law in 1969.

== Career ==
Cherry began his career as a Deputy Clark County Public Defender. He then became a partner at the law firm of Manos, Bailus, and Kelesis.

In 1981 he was appointed as Special Master of the MGM Grand Fire Litigation. Two years later he assumed the duties of the Special Master of the Las Vegas Hilton Fire Litigation. At both of these jobs he served as a liaison between the plaintiffs' attorneys, defense attorneys, and court. The work he did as Special Master earned him recognition since he helped establish procedures which are now a part of mass disaster litigation.

In 1997 he was appointed to the Clark County Special Public Defender's Office to handle conflict and homicide cases. In 1998 Cherry was elected as a District Court Judge in Clark County.

In 2006 he was elected to the Nevada Supreme Court. In 2012 he was reelected. His term expired in January 2019. He served as chief justice from 2012–2013 and again from 2017–2018.

Cherry retired in 2019.

== See also ==
- List of Jewish American jurists

Legal offices
Preceded by Nancy Saitta	Chief Justice of the Nevada Supreme Court; 2012–2013	Succeeded by Kristina Pickering
Preceded by Ron Parraguirre	Chief Justice of the Nevada Supreme Court; 2017–2018	Succeeded by Michael L. Douglas
