= Michael L. Douglas =

American judge

Chief Justice of the Nevada Supreme Court
- In office January 1, 2018 – January 7, 2019
- Preceded by: Michael Cherry
- Succeeded by: Mark Gibbons
- In office January 3, 2011 – September 5, 2011
- Preceded by: Ron Parraguirre
- Succeeded by: Nancy Saitta

Justice of the Nevada Supreme Court
- In office April 19, 2004 – January 6, 2019
- Appointed by: Kenny Guinn
- Preceded by: Myron E. Leavitt
- Succeeded by: Abbi Silver

Personal details
- Born: March 13, 1948 (age 78) Los Angeles, California, U.S.
- Education: California State University, Long Beach (BA); University of California, Hastings (JD)

Michael Lawrence Douglas (born March 13, 1948) is a former justice of the Supreme Court of Nevada. He was appointed in 2004, and his term ended in 2019. When Douglas was appointed, he became the first African-American Supreme Court Justice in the State of Nevada.

Douglas graduated from California State College, Long Beach in 1971 and University of California, Hastings College of the Law in 1974.

Douglas retired in January 2019.

== See also ==
- List of African-American jurists

Legal offices
Preceded by Ron Parraguirre	Chief Justice of the Nevada Supreme Court; 2011	Succeeded by Nancy Saitta
Preceded by Michael Cherry	Chief Justice of the Nevada Supreme Court; 2018–2019	Succeeded by Mark Gibbons
