= Linda M. Bell =

American judge (born 1967 or 1968)

Linda Bell

Justice of the Nevada Supreme Court
- Incumbent
- Assumed office January 2, 2023
- Preceded by: James Hardesty

Personal details
- Born: 1967 or 1968 (age 58–59)
- Education: University of Nevada, Reno (BA); University of San Diego (JD)

Linda Marie Bell (born 1967 or 1968) is an American lawyer from Nevada who has served as a justice of the Nevada Supreme Court since 2023. Bell previously served as a judge of the Nevada Eighth Judicial District from 2009 to 2023.

== Education ==
Bell graduated with honors from Bonanza High School. She graduated with honors from the University of Nevada, Reno, with a degree in psychology. She received a Juris Doctor magna cum laude from the University of San Diego School of Law where she served as an articles editor of the University of San Diego Law Review. Bell was admitted to the Nevada State Bar in October 1993. In 2008, she graduated from the Las Vegas Chamber of Commerce Leadership Las Vegas program.

== Career ==
While in law school, Bell worked for the Clark County District Attorney's office and the San Diego Public Defender's office. Bell served as a public defender for twelve years and spent five years as a Clark County Public Defender. Since 2011, Bell has taught criminal law and criminal procedure at the University of Nevada, Las Vegas. In November 2008, Bell was elected as a judge of the Eighth Judicial District Court, taking her seat in January 2009. She was elected chief judge in 2019.

=== Nevada Supreme Court ===
In January 2022, Bell announced her candidacy for the Nevada Supreme Court. Bell ran unopposed for Seat A of the Nevada Supreme Court. She assumed office on January 2, 2023.

Legal offices
Preceded by James Hardesty	Justice of the Nevada Supreme Court; 2023–present	Incumbent
