= James Hardesty =

American judge

Chief Justice of the Nevada Supreme Court
- In office January 4, 2021 – January 5, 2022
- Preceded by: Kristina Pickering
- Succeeded by: Ron Parraguirre
- In office January 5, 2015 – January 4, 2016
- Preceded by: Mark Gibbons
- Succeeded by: Ron Parraguirre
- In office January 2, 2009 – January 4, 2010
- Preceded by: Mark Gibbons
- Succeeded by: Ron Parraguirre

Justice of the Nevada Supreme Court Seat A
- In office January 3, 2005 – January 2, 2023
- Preceded by: Miriam C. Shearing
- Succeeded by: Linda M. Bell

Personal details
- Born: James William Hardesty; November 28, 1948 (age 76)
- Political party: Democratic
- Education: University of Nevada, Reno (BS); University of the Pacific (JD)

James William Hardesty (born November 28, 1948) served as a justice of the Nevada Supreme Court. He was elected in 2004, and reelected in 2010 and 2016. He earned a Bachelor of Science degree from University of Nevada and a Juris Doctor from the McGeorge School of Law.

He defeated Cynthia Dianne Steel in the 2004 election 46.12% to 33.53%, and was unopposed in his 2010 re-election.

He was sworn in as Chief Justice of the Nevada Supreme Court on January 4, 2021.

Legal offices
Preceded by Miriam C. Shearing	Justice of the Nevada Supreme Court; 2005–2023	Succeeded by Linda M. Bell
Preceded by Mark Gibbons	Chief Justice of the Nevada Supreme Court; 2009–2010	Succeeded by Ron Parraguirre
Preceded by Mark Gibbons	Chief Justice of the Nevada Supreme Court; 2015–2016	Succeeded by Ron Parraguirre
Preceded by Kristina Pickering	Chief Justice of the Nevada Supreme Court; 2021–2022	Succeeded by Ron Parraguirre
