= Ron Parraguirre =

American judge (born 1959)

Chief Justice of the Nevada Supreme Court
- In office January 5, 2022 – January 2, 2023
- Preceded by: James Hardesty
- Succeeded by: Lidia S. Stiglich
- In office January 4, 2016 – January 2, 2017
- Preceded by: James Hardesty
- Succeeded by: Michael Cherry
- In office January 4, 2010 – January 3, 2011
- Preceded by: James Hardesty
- Succeeded by: Michael L. Douglas

Justice of the Nevada Supreme Court
- Incumbent
- Assumed office January 3, 2005
- Preceded by: Deborah Agosti

Personal details
- Born: Ronald David Parraguirre; July 8, 1959 (age 65)
- Political party: Republican
- Education: San Diego State University (BA); University of San Diego (JD)

Ronald David "Ron" Parraguirre (born July 8, 1959) is a justice of the Nevada Supreme Court. He is also a former president of the Nevada District Judges Association. He received his Juris Doctor from the University of San Diego School of Law.

He served as chief justice from January 4, 2016 to January 4, 2017. He began a new term as chief on January 5, 2022.

Legal offices
Preceded by Deborah Agosti	Justice of the Nevada Supreme Court; 2005–present	Incumbent
Preceded by James Hardesty	Chief Justice of the Nevada Supreme Court; 2010–2011	Succeeded by Michael L. Douglas
Preceded by James Hardesty	Chief Justice of the Nevada Supreme Court; 2016–2017	Succeeded by Michael Cherry
Preceded by James Hardesty	Chief Justice of the Nevada Supreme Court; 2022–2023	Succeeded by Lidia S. Stiglich
