= Supreme Court of Nevada =

Highest court in the U.S. state of Nevada

- Established: 1864
- Jurisdiction: Nevada, United States
- Location: Carson City; Las Vegas (secondary office)
- Composition method: Election
- Authorized by: Nevada State Constitution
- Appeals to: Supreme Court of the United States
- Judge term length: 6 years
- Number of positions: 7
- Website: Official Website

Chief Justice
- Currently: Douglas W. Herndon
- Since: January 6, 2025

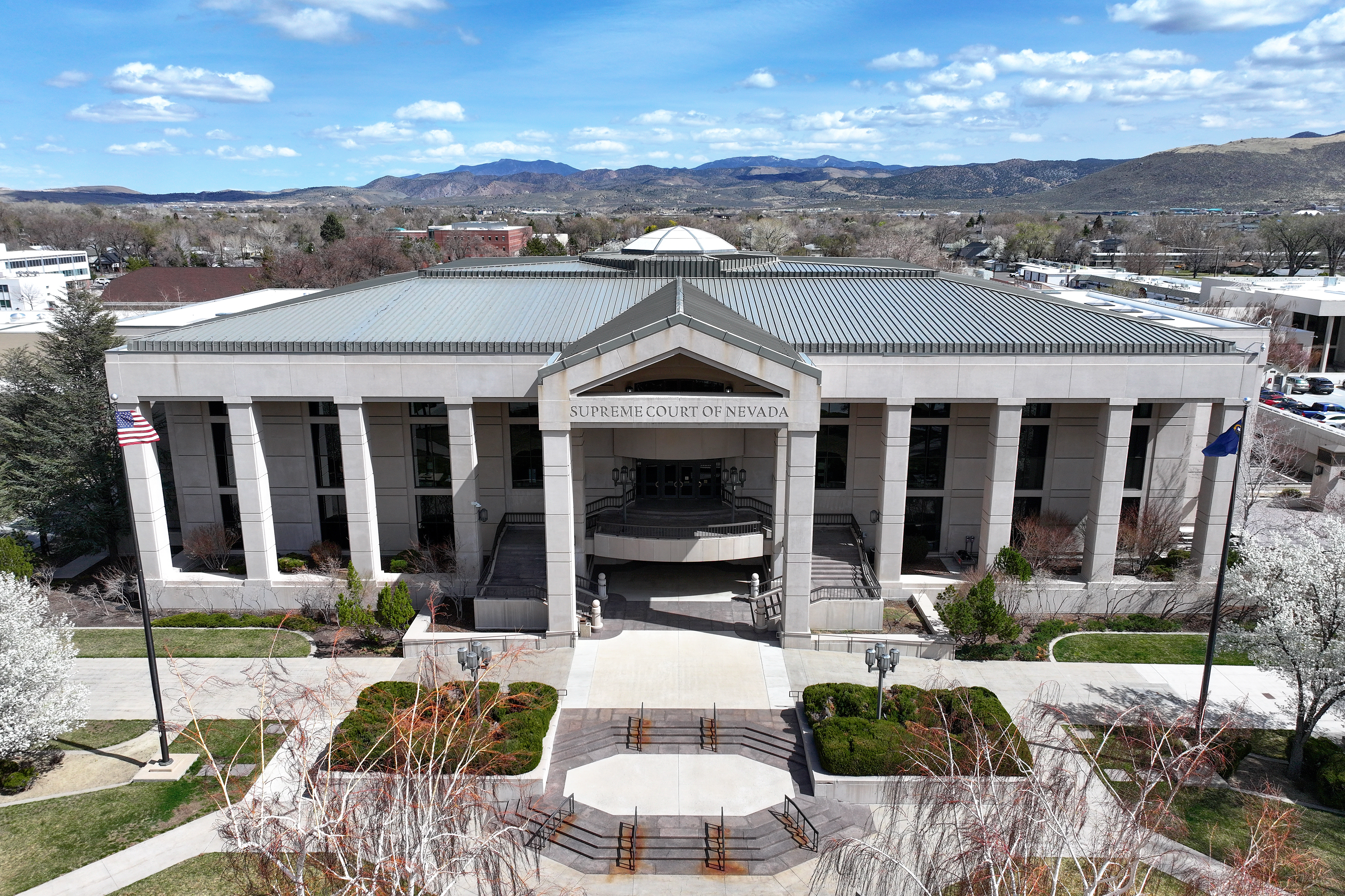
Supreme Court of Nevada, Carson City, Nevada

The Supreme Court of Nevada is the highest state court of the U.S. state of Nevada, and the head of the Nevada Judiciary. The main constitutional function of the Supreme Court is to review appeals made directly from the decisions of the district courts. The Supreme Court does not pursue fact-finding by conducting trials, but rather determines whether legal errors were committed in the rendering of the lower court's decision. While the Court must consider all cases filed, it has the discretion to send appeals to the Nevada Court of Appeals for final resolution, as well as the power to determine the jurisdiction of that court.

There are seven Justices on the court, who are elected to six-year terms in officially nonpartisan elections and who are not subject to term limits, which were rejected by voters in 1996. The Governor appoints Justices in the case of a vacancy. The most senior justice becomes Chief Justice for a two-year term.

== History ==
When Nevada was admitted to the federal Union in 1864, three justices were elected to the Supreme Court for a term of six years. This was increased to five justices in 1967, and to seven justices in 1997.

Despite experiencing a spectacular population boom in the 1980s, 1990s, and 2000s, Nevada was unable for many years to establish an intermediate appellate court, like the vast majority of U.S. states. Attempts to create one all failed at the ballot box in 1972, 1980, 1992, and 2010. The result was extraordinarily severe congestion at the appellate level, as all appeals must be processed through the state supreme court. The alternative would be to have no right to appeal, since the U.S. Supreme Court has ruled that appeal is not a constitutional right, which until the early 2000s was the actual situation in New Hampshire and West Virginia, as well as Virginia until 2023. Nevada, however, has guaranteed its residents a right to appeal since statehood. From the 1980s to the present, Nevada state supreme court justices have been burdened with the highest per-justice caseloads of any state supreme court in the United States.

In January 1999, to bring its soaring backlog under control, the Supreme Court of Nevada adopted for the first time a measure that was frequently used by the Supreme Court of California prior to the creation of the California Courts of Appeal in 1904 (and for a few years afterward). The Court divided itself into two three-justice panels which rotate membership every 12 months. The majority of cases are now heard and decided by the three-justice panels, with one panel in Carson City and one panel in Las Vegas. The Chief Justice is the administrative head of the court system, with authority to divide the work of the Supreme Court among the justices, assign district judges to assist in other judicial districts or to special functions, and assign retired judges or justices to appropriate temporary duty.

The primary advantage of this system is that it is often easier and faster to negotiate a consensus on the key points of a majority opinion among three instead of seven justices. The disadvantages are that the two panels might inadvertently issue conflicting majority opinions; and that an appellant might be ruled against by two justices on a panel of three, who might have been a minority if the case had been heard by a full court of seven justices.

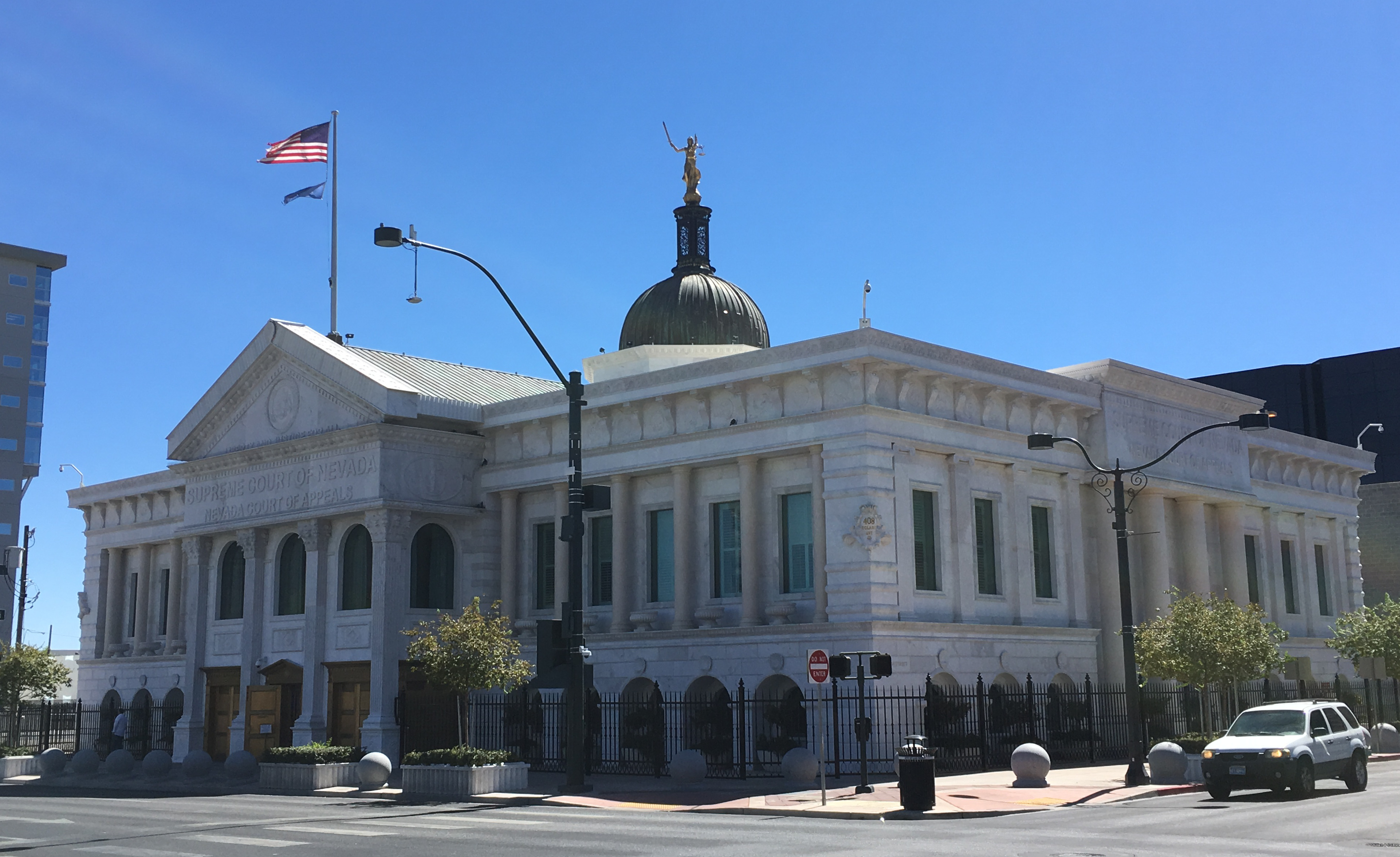
The court's secondary courthouse in Las Vegas, which it shares with the Court of Appeals

Meanwhile, the state supreme court continued to lobby the people and the legislature of the state of Nevada to create an intermediate appellate court. The Legislature eventually authorized the latest attempt to appear on the November 2, 2010 ballot. Question 2, however, was narrowly rejected by 53% of the 670,126 votes cast. The same issue appeared again as Question 1 on the November 4, 2014 ballot, which was narrowly approved by Nevada voters by a 54 percent to 46 percent margin. Nevada then immediately established a Nevada Court of Appeals.

The new court operates under a "push down" or "deflective" model similar to Iowa, in which the intermediate appellate court handles the tedious task known as "error correction" among appellate specialists. That is, all appeals are still filed with the Supreme Court of Nevada, but are then screened to determine whether they involve truly novel issues of law or important issues of public policy, as opposed to contentions that the trial court erred by failing to apply existing precedent. Based on historical data, about one third of future Nevada appeals are expected to fall into the latter category and will be reassigned to the Court of Appeals, thereby enabling the state supreme court to focus on deciding hard questions in the remaining cases. In turn, appeals from the decisions of the Court of Appeals to the Supreme Court will be at the discretion of the Supreme Court, as with intermediate appellate courts in other states.

In January 2021, the Nevada Supreme Court decided to retroactively apply same-sex marriage (in terms of property and assets) from before 2014 legal recognition.

== Current justices ==
Seat	Name	Born	Start	Chief term	Term ends	Appointer	Law school
D	Douglas W. Herndon, Chief Justice	May 29, 1964 (age 62)	January 4, 2021	2025–present	2032	—N/a (Note: Took office after being elected in a nonpartisan election.)	W&L
E	Ron Parraguirre	July 8, 1959 (age 67)	January 3, 2005	2022–2023; 2016–2017; 2010–2011	2028	—N/a	USD
B	Kristina Pickering	October 7, 1952 (age 74)	January 5, 2009	2020–2021; 2013	2032	—N/a	UC Davis
G	Lidia S. Stiglich	November 12, 1969 (age 56)	December 5, 2016	2023–2024	2030	Brian Sandoval (R)	UC Hastings
C	Elissa F. Cadish	August 8, 1964 (age 62)	January 7, 2019	2024–2025	2030	—N/a	UVA
F	Patricia Lee	August 19, 1975 (age 51)	November 21, 2022	–	2030	Steve Sisolak (D)	GWU
A	Linda M. Bell	December 23, 1967 (age 58)	January 2, 2023	–	2028	—N/a	USD
