= List of justices of the Supreme Court of Nevada =

== Territorial Supreme Court ==
- George Turner (1861–1864)
- Horatio M. Jones (1861–1864)
- Gordon N. Mott (1861–1864)
- Powhatan B. Locke (1864–1864)
- John W. North (1864–1864)

== Statehood ==
Following is a list of the Supreme Court of Nevada justices.

Years			Seat 1	Seat 2	Seat 3		
1864	seats established in 1967		H. O. Beatty	Cornelius M. Brosnan	James F. Lewis	seats established in 1999	
1865	seats established in 1967		H. O. Beatty	Cornelius M. Brosnan	James F. Lewis	seats established in 1999	
1866	seats established in 1967		H. O. Beatty	Cornelius M. Brosnan	James F. Lewis	seats established in 1999	
1867	seats established in 1967		H. O. Beatty	Cornelius M. Brosnan	James F. Lewis	seats established in 1999	
1867	seats established in 1967		H. O. Beatty	J. Neely Johnson	James F. Lewis	seats established in 1999	
1868	seats established in 1967		H. O. Beatty	J. Neely Johnson	James F. Lewis	seats established in 1999	
1869	seats established in 1967		Bernard C. Whitman	J. Neely Johnson	James F. Lewis	seats established in 1999	
1870	seats established in 1967		Bernard C. Whitman	J. Neely Johnson	James F. Lewis	seats established in 1999	
1871	seats established in 1967		Bernard C. Whitman	John Garber	James F. Lewis	seats established in 1999	
1872	seats established in 1967		Bernard C. Whitman	John Garber	James F. Lewis	seats established in 1999	
1873	seats established in 1967		Bernard C. Whitman	Charles H. Belknap	Thomas P. Hawley	seats established in 1999	
1874	seats established in 1967		Bernard C. Whitman	Charles H. Belknap	Thomas P. Hawley	seats established in 1999	
1875	seats established in 1967		William H. Beatty	Warner Earll	Thomas P. Hawley	seats established in 1999	
1876	seats established in 1967		William H. Beatty	Warner Earll	Thomas P. Hawley	seats established in 1999	
1877	seats established in 1967		William H. Beatty	Orville R. Leonard	Thomas P. Hawley	seats established in 1999	
1878	seats established in 1967		William H. Beatty	Orville R. Leonard	Thomas P. Hawley	seats established in 1999	
1879	seats established in 1967		William H. Beatty	Orville R. Leonard	Thomas P. Hawley	seats established in 1999	
1880	seats established in 1967		William H. Beatty	Orville R. Leonard	Thomas P. Hawley	seats established in 1999	
1881	seats established in 1967		Charles H. Belknap	Orville R. Leonard	Thomas P. Hawley	seats established in 1999	
1882	seats established in 1967		Charles H. Belknap	Orville R. Leonard	Thomas P. Hawley	seats established in 1999	
1883	seats established in 1967		Charles H. Belknap	Orville R. Leonard	Thomas P. Hawley	seats established in 1999	
1884	seats established in 1967		Charles H. Belknap	Orville R. Leonard	Thomas P. Hawley	seats established in 1999	
1885	seats established in 1967		Charles H. Belknap	Orville R. Leonard	Thomas P. Hawley	seats established in 1999	
1886	seats established in 1967		Charles H. Belknap	Orville R. Leonard	Thomas P. Hawley	seats established in 1999	
1887	seats established in 1967		Charles H. Belknap	Orville R. Leonard	Thomas P. Hawley	seats established in 1999	
1888	seats established in 1967		Charles H. Belknap	Orville R. Leonard	Thomas P. Hawley	seats established in 1999	
1889	seats established in 1967		Charles H. Belknap	Michael A. Murphy	Thomas P. Hawley	seats established in 1999	
1890	seats established in 1967		Charles H. Belknap	Michael A. Murphy	Thomas P. Hawley	seats established in 1999	
1891	seats established in 1967		Charles H. Belknap	Michael A. Murphy	Rensselaer R. Bigelow	seats established in 1999	
1892	seats established in 1967		Charles H. Belknap	Michael A. Murphy	Rensselaer R. Bigelow	seats established in 1999	
1893	seats established in 1967		Charles H. Belknap	Michael A. Murphy	Rensselaer R. Bigelow	seats established in 1999	
1894	seats established in 1967		Charles H. Belknap	Michael A. Murphy	Rensselaer R. Bigelow	seats established in 1999	
1895	seats established in 1967		Charles H. Belknap	McKaskia Stearns Bonnifield	Rensselaer R. Bigelow	seats established in 1999	
1896	seats established in 1967		Charles H. Belknap	McKaskia Stearns Bonnifield	Rensselaer R. Bigelow	seats established in 1999	
1897	seats established in 1967		Charles H. Belknap	McKaskia Stearns Bonnifield	William A. Massey	seats established in 1999	
1898	seats established in 1967		Charles H. Belknap	McKaskia Stearns Bonnifield	William A. Massey	seats established in 1999	
1899	seats established in 1967		Charles H. Belknap	McKaskia Stearns Bonnifield	William A. Massey	seats established in 1999	
1900	seats established in 1967		Charles H. Belknap	McKaskia Stearns Bonnifield	William A. Massey	seats established in 1999	
1901	seats established in 1967		Charles H. Belknap	Adolphus L. Fitzgerald	William A. Massey	seats established in 1999	
1902	seats established in 1967		Charles H. Belknap	Adolphus L. Fitzgerald	Thomas V. Julien	seats established in 1999	
1903	seats established in 1967		Charles H. Belknap	Adolphus L. Fitzgerald	George F. Talbot	seats established in 1999	
1904	seats established in 1967		Charles H. Belknap	Adolphus L. Fitzgerald	George F. Talbot	seats established in 1999	
1905	seats established in 1967		Frank H. Norcross	Adolphus L. Fitzgerald	George F. Talbot	seats established in 1999	
1906	seats established in 1967		Frank H. Norcross	Adolphus L. Fitzgerald	George F. Talbot	seats established in 1999	
1907	seats established in 1967		Frank H. Norcross	James G. Sweeney	George F. Talbot	seats established in 1999	
1908	seats established in 1967		Frank H. Norcross	James G. Sweeney	George F. Talbot	seats established in 1999	
1909	seats established in 1967		Frank H. Norcross	James G. Sweeney	George F. Talbot	seats established in 1999	
1910	seats established in 1967		Frank H. Norcross	James G. Sweeney	George F. Talbot	seats established in 1999	
1911	seats established in 1967		Frank H. Norcross	James G. Sweeney	George F. Talbot	seats established in 1999	
1912	seats established in 1967		Frank H. Norcross	James G. Sweeney	George F. Talbot	seats established in 1999	
1913	seats established in 1967		Frank H. Norcross	Patrick McCarran	George F. Talbot	seats established in 1999	
1914	seats established in 1967		Frank H. Norcross	Patrick McCarran	George F. Talbot	seats established in 1999	
1915	seats established in 1967		Frank H. Norcross	Patrick McCarran	Benjamin W. Coleman	seats established in 1999	
1916	seats established in 1967		Frank H. Norcross	Patrick McCarran	Benjamin W. Coleman	seats established in 1999	
1917	seats established in 1967		John A. Sanders	Patrick McCarran	Benjamin W. Coleman	seats established in 1999	
1918	seats established in 1967		John A. Sanders	Patrick McCarran	Benjamin W. Coleman	seats established in 1999	
1919	seats established in 1967		John A. Sanders	Edward A. Ducker	Benjamin W. Coleman	seats established in 1999	
1920	seats established in 1967		John A. Sanders	Edward A. Ducker	Benjamin W. Coleman	seats established in 1999	
1921	seats established in 1967		John A. Sanders	Edward A. Ducker	Benjamin W. Coleman	seats established in 1999	
1922	seats established in 1967		John A. Sanders	Edward A. Ducker	Benjamin W. Coleman	seats established in 1999	
1923	seats established in 1967		John A. Sanders	Edward A. Ducker	Benjamin W. Coleman	seats established in 1999	
1924	seats established in 1967		John A. Sanders	Edward A. Ducker	Benjamin W. Coleman	seats established in 1999	
1925	seats established in 1967		John A. Sanders	Edward A. Ducker	Benjamin W. Coleman	seats established in 1999	
1926	seats established in 1967		John A. Sanders	Edward A. Ducker	Benjamin W. Coleman	seats established in 1999	
1927	seats established in 1967		John A. Sanders	Edward A. Ducker	Benjamin W. Coleman	seats established in 1999	
1928	seats established in 1967		John A. Sanders	Edward A. Ducker	Benjamin W. Coleman	seats established in 1999	
1929	seats established in 1967		John A. Sanders	Edward A. Ducker	Benjamin W. Coleman	seats established in 1999	
1930	seats established in 1967		John A. Sanders	Edward A. Ducker	Benjamin W. Coleman	seats established in 1999	
1931	seats established in 1967		John A. Sanders	Edward A. Ducker	Benjamin W. Coleman	seats established in 1999	
1932	seats established in 1967		John A. Sanders	Edward A. Ducker	Benjamin W. Coleman	seats established in 1999	
1933	seats established in 1967		John A. Sanders	Edward A. Ducker	Benjamin W. Coleman	seats established in 1999	
1934	seats established in 1967		John A. Sanders	Edward A. Ducker	Benjamin W. Coleman	seats established in 1999	
1935	seats established in 1967		E. J. L. Taber	Edward A. Ducker	Benjamin W. Coleman	seats established in 1999	
1936	seats established in 1967		E. J. L. Taber	Edward A. Ducker	Benjamin W. Coleman	seats established in 1999	
1937	seats established in 1967		E. J. L. Taber	Edward A. Ducker	Benjamin W. Coleman	seats established in 1999	
1938	seats established in 1967		E. J. L. Taber	Edward A. Ducker	Benjamin W. Coleman	seats established in 1999	
1939	seats established in 1967		E. J. L. Taber	Edward A. Ducker	Benjamin W. Coleman	seats established in 1999	
1939	seats established in 1967		E. J. L. Taber	Edward A. Ducker	William Edwin Orr	seats established in 1999	
1940	seats established in 1967		E. J. L. Taber	Edward A. Ducker	William Edwin Orr	seats established in 1999	
1941	seats established in 1967		E. J. L. Taber	Edward A. Ducker	William Edwin Orr	seats established in 1999	
1942	seats established in 1967		E. J. L. Taber	Edward A. Ducker	William Edwin Orr	seats established in 1999	
1943	seats established in 1967		E. J. L. Taber	Edward A. Ducker	William Edwin Orr	seats established in 1999	
1944	seats established in 1967		E. J. L. Taber	Edward A. Ducker	William Edwin Orr	seats established in 1999	
1945	seats established in 1967		E. J. L. Taber	Edward A. Ducker	William Edwin Orr	seats established in 1999	
1945	seats established in 1967		E. J. L. Taber	Edward A. Ducker	Charles Lee Horsey	seats established in 1999	
1946	seats established in 1967		E. J. L. Taber	Edward A. Ducker	Charles Lee Horsey	seats established in 1999	
1946	seats established in 1967		E. J. L. Taber	Edgar Eather	Charles Lee Horsey	seats established in 1999	
1947	seats established in 1967		E. J. L. Taber	Edgar Eather	Charles Lee Horsey	seats established in 1999	
1947	seats established in 1967		Milton B. Badt	Edgar Eather	Charles Lee Horsey	seats established in 1999	
1948	seats established in 1967		Milton B. Badt	Edgar Eather	Charles Lee Horsey	seats established in 1999	
1949	seats established in 1967		Milton B. Badt	Edgar Eather	Charles Lee Horsey	seats established in 1999	
1950	seats established in 1967		Milton B. Badt	Edgar Eather	Charles Lee Horsey	seats established in 1999	
1951	seats established in 1967		Milton B. Badt	Edgar Eather	Charles M. Merrill	seats established in 1999	
1952	seats established in 1967		Milton B. Badt	Edgar Eather	Charles M. Merrill	seats established in 1999	
1953	seats established in 1967		Milton B. Badt	Edgar Eather	Charles M. Merrill	seats established in 1999	
1954	seats established in 1967		Milton B. Badt	Edgar Eather	Charles M. Merrill	seats established in 1999	
1955	seats established in 1967		Milton B. Badt	Edgar Eather	Charles M. Merrill	seats established in 1999	
1956	seats established in 1967		Milton B. Badt	Edgar Eather	Charles M. Merrill	seats established in 1999	
1957	seats established in 1967		Milton B. Badt	Edgar Eather	Charles M. Merrill	seats established in 1999	
1958	seats established in 1967		Milton B. Badt	Edgar Eather	Charles M. Merrill	seats established in 1999	
1959	seats established in 1967		Milton B. Badt	Frank McNamee	Charles M. Merrill	seats established in 1999	
1959	seats established in 1967		Milton B. Badt	Frank McNamee	Miles N. Pike	seats established in 1999	
1960	seats established in 1967		Milton B. Badt	Frank McNamee	Miles N. Pike	seats established in 1999	
1961	seats established in 1967		Milton B. Badt	Frank McNamee	Miles N. Pike	seats established in 1999	
1961	seats established in 1967		Milton B. Badt	Frank McNamee	Gordon R. Thompson	seats established in 1999	
1962	seats established in 1967		Milton B. Badt	Frank McNamee	Gordon R. Thompson	seats established in 1999	
1963	seats established in 1967		Milton B. Badt	Frank McNamee	Gordon R. Thompson	seats established in 1999	
1964	seats established in 1967		Milton B. Badt	Frank McNamee	Gordon R. Thompson	seats established in 1999	
1965	seats established in 1967		Milton B. Badt	Frank McNamee	Gordon R. Thompson	seats established in 1999	
1965	seats established in 1967		Milton B. Badt	David Zenoff	Gordon R. Thompson	seats established in 1999	
1966	seats established in 1967		Milton B. Badt	David Zenoff	Gordon R. Thompson	seats established in 1999	
1966	seats established in 1967		Jon R. Collins	David Zenoff	Gordon R. Thompson	seats established in 1999	
1967	seats established in 1967		Jon R. Collins	David Zenoff	Gordon R. Thompson	seats established in 1999	
1967	John C. Mowbray	Cameron McV. Batjer	Jon R. Collins	David Zenoff	Gordon R. Thompson	seats established in 1999	
1968	John C. Mowbray	Cameron McV. Batjer	Jon R. Collins	David Zenoff	Gordon R. Thompson	seats established in 1999	
1969	John C. Mowbray	Cameron McV. Batjer	Jon R. Collins	David Zenoff	Gordon R. Thompson	seats established in 1999	
1970	John C. Mowbray	Cameron McV. Batjer	Jon R. Collins	David Zenoff	Gordon R. Thompson	seats established in 1999	
1971	John C. Mowbray	Cameron McV. Batjer	Elmer M. Gunderson	David Zenoff	Gordon R. Thompson	seats established in 1999	
1972	John C. Mowbray	Cameron McV. Batjer	Elmer M. Gunderson	David Zenoff	Gordon R. Thompson	seats established in 1999	
1973	John C. Mowbray	Cameron McV. Batjer	Elmer M. Gunderson	David Zenoff	Gordon R. Thompson	seats established in 1999	
1974	John C. Mowbray	Cameron McV. Batjer	Elmer M. Gunderson	David Zenoff	Gordon R. Thompson	seats established in 1999	
1975	John C. Mowbray	Cameron McV. Batjer	Elmer M. Gunderson	David Zenoff	Gordon R. Thompson	seats established in 1999	
1976	John C. Mowbray	Cameron McV. Batjer	Elmer M. Gunderson	David Zenoff	Gordon R. Thompson	seats established in 1999	
1977	John C. Mowbray	Cameron McV. Batjer	Elmer M. Gunderson	David Zenoff	Gordon R. Thompson	seats established in 1999	
1977	John C. Mowbray	Cameron McV. Batjer	Elmer M. Gunderson	Noel E. Manoukian	Gordon R. Thompson	seats established in 1999	
1978	John C. Mowbray	Cameron McV. Batjer	Elmer M. Gunderson	Noel E. Manoukian	Gordon R. Thompson	seats established in 1999	
1979	John C. Mowbray	Cameron McV. Batjer	Elmer M. Gunderson	Noel E. Manoukian	Gordon R. Thompson	seats established in 1999	
1980	John C. Mowbray	Cameron McV. Batjer	Elmer M. Gunderson	Noel E. Manoukian	Gordon R. Thompson	seats established in 1999	
1981	John C. Mowbray	Cameron McV. Batjer	Elmer M. Gunderson	Noel E. Manoukian	Charles E. Springer	seats established in 1999	
1982	John C. Mowbray	Thomas L. Steffen	Elmer M. Gunderson	Noel E. Manoukian	Charles E. Springer	seats established in 1999	
1983	John C. Mowbray	Thomas L. Steffen	Elmer M. Gunderson	Noel E. Manoukian	Charles E. Springer	seats established in 1999	
1984	John C. Mowbray	Thomas L. Steffen	Elmer M. Gunderson	Noel E. Manoukian	Charles E. Springer	seats established in 1999	
1985	John C. Mowbray	Thomas L. Steffen	Elmer M. Gunderson	C. Clifton Young	Charles E. Springer	seats established in 1999	
1986	John C. Mowbray	Thomas L. Steffen	Elmer M. Gunderson	C. Clifton Young	Charles E. Springer	seats established in 1999	
1987	John C. Mowbray	Thomas L. Steffen	Elmer M. Gunderson	C. Clifton Young	Charles E. Springer	seats established in 1999	
1988	John C. Mowbray	Thomas L. Steffen	Elmer M. Gunderson	C. Clifton Young	Charles E. Springer	seats established in 1999	
1989	John C. Mowbray	Thomas L. Steffen	Robert E. Rose	C. Clifton Young	Charles E. Springer	seats established in 1999	
1990	John C. Mowbray	Thomas L. Steffen	Robert E. Rose	C. Clifton Young	Charles E. Springer	seats established in 1999	
1991	John C. Mowbray	Thomas L. Steffen	Robert E. Rose	C. Clifton Young	Charles E. Springer	seats established in 1999	
1992	John C. Mowbray	Thomas L. Steffen	Robert E. Rose	C. Clifton Young	Charles E. Springer	seats established in 1999	
1993	Miriam Shearing	Thomas L. Steffen	Robert E. Rose	C. Clifton Young	Charles E. Springer	seats established in 1999	
1994	Miriam Shearing	Thomas L. Steffen	Robert E. Rose	C. Clifton Young	Charles E. Springer	seats established in 1999	
1995	Miriam Shearing	Thomas L. Steffen	Robert E. Rose	C. Clifton Young	Charles E. Springer	seats established in 1999	
1996	Miriam Shearing	Thomas L. Steffen	Robert E. Rose	C. Clifton Young	Charles E. Springer	seats established in 1999	
1997	Miriam Shearing	A. William Maupin	Robert E. Rose	C. Clifton Young	Charles E. Springer	seats established in 1999	
1998	Miriam Shearing	A. William Maupin	Robert E. Rose	C. Clifton Young	Charles E. Springer	seats established in 1999	
1999	Miriam Shearing	A. William Maupin	Robert E. Rose	C. Clifton Young	Deborah Agosti	Myron E. Leavitt	Nancy A. Becker
2000	Miriam Shearing	A. William Maupin	Robert E. Rose	C. Clifton Young	Deborah Agosti	Myron E. Leavitt	Nancy A. Becker
2001	Miriam Shearing	A. William Maupin	Robert E. Rose	C. Clifton Young	Deborah Agosti	Myron E. Leavitt	Nancy A. Becker
2002	Miriam Shearing	A. William Maupin	Robert E. Rose	C. Clifton Young	Deborah Agosti	Myron E. Leavitt	Nancy A. Becker
2003	Miriam Shearing	A. William Maupin	Robert E. Rose	Mark Gibbons	Deborah Agosti	Myron E. Leavitt	Nancy A. Becker
2004	Miriam Shearing	A. William Maupin	Robert E. Rose	Mark Gibbons	Deborah Agosti	Michael L. Douglas	Nancy A. Becker
2005	James Hardesty	A. William Maupin	Robert E. Rose	Mark Gibbons	Ron Parraguirre	Michael L. Douglas	Nancy A. Becker
2006	James Hardesty	A. William Maupin	Robert E. Rose	Mark Gibbons	Ron Parraguirre	Michael L. Douglas	Nancy A. Becker
2007	James Hardesty	A. William Maupin	Michael Cherry	Mark Gibbons	Ron Parraguirre	Michael L. Douglas	Nancy Saitta
2008	James Hardesty	A. William Maupin	Michael Cherry	Mark Gibbons	Ron Parraguirre	Michael L. Douglas	Nancy Saitta
2009	James Hardesty	Kristina Pickering	Michael Cherry	Mark Gibbons	Ron Parraguirre	Michael L. Douglas	Nancy Saitta
2010	James Hardesty	Kristina Pickering	Michael Cherry	Mark Gibbons	Ron Parraguirre	Michael L. Douglas	Nancy Saitta
2011	James Hardesty	Kristina Pickering	Michael Cherry	Mark Gibbons	Ron Parraguirre	Michael L. Douglas	Nancy Saitta
2012	James Hardesty	Kristina Pickering	Michael Cherry	Mark Gibbons	Ron Parraguirre	Michael L. Douglas	Nancy Saitta
2013	James Hardesty	Kristina Pickering	Michael Cherry	Mark Gibbons	Ron Parraguirre	Michael L. Douglas	Nancy Saitta
2014	James Hardesty	Kristina Pickering	Michael Cherry	Mark Gibbons	Ron Parraguirre	Michael L. Douglas	Nancy Saitta
2015	James Hardesty	Kristina Pickering	Michael Cherry	Mark Gibbons	Ron Parraguirre	Michael L. Douglas	Nancy Saitta
2016	James Hardesty	Kristina Pickering	Michael Cherry	Mark Gibbons	Ron Parraguirre	Michael L. Douglas	Nancy Saitta
2017	James Hardesty	Kristina Pickering	Michael Cherry	Mark Gibbons	Ron Parraguirre	Michael L. Douglas	Lidia S. Stiglich
2018	James Hardesty	Kristina Pickering	Michael Cherry	Mark Gibbons	Ron Parraguirre	Michael L. Douglas	Lidia S. Stiglich
2019	James Hardesty	Kristina Pickering	Elissa F. Cadish	Mark Gibbons	Ron Parraguirre	Abbi Silver	Lidia S. Stiglich
2020	James Hardesty	Kristina Pickering	Elissa F. Cadish	Mark Gibbons	Ron Parraguirre	Abbi Silver	Lidia S. Stiglich
2021	James Hardesty	Kristina Pickering	Elissa F. Cadish	Douglas W. Herndon	Ron Parraguirre	Abbi Silver	Lidia S. Stiglich
2022	James Hardesty	Kristina Pickering	Elissa F. Cadish	Douglas W. Herndon	Ron Parraguirre	Abbi Silver	Lidia S. Stiglich
2023	Linda M. Bell	Kristina Pickering	Elissa F. Cadish	Douglas W. Herndon	Ron Parraguirre	Patricia Lee	Lidia S. Stiglich
Years	Seat A	Seat B	Seat C	Seat D	Seat E	Seat F	Seat G

== Chief justices ==
The Chief Justice rotates on the Supreme Court of Nevada, almost always to a judge who is in their final two years of their term. Following the expansions of the court in 1967 and 1999, judges began to split what had traditionally been a two-year term between two or three justices, allowing each justice the opportunity to be Chief Justice during their six-year term. For many chief justices, the date of dates of tenure are drawn from the dates of court terms in the Nevada Judicial History Database.

Order (sequential)	Order (by first tenure)	Chief Justice	Began	Ended	Ref.
— (territorial)		George Turner	March 27, 1861	August 22, 1864	
1	1	James F. Lewis	November 8, 1864	January 7, 1867	
2	2	H. O. Beatty	January 7, 1867	November 9, 1868	
3	1	James F. Lewis	November 9, 1868	January 6, 1873	
4	3	Bernard C. Whitman	January 6, 1873	January 4, 1875	
5	4	Thomas P. Hawley	January 4, 1875	January 6, 1879	
6	5	William H. Beatty	January 6, 1879	January 3, 1881	
7	6	Orville R. Leonard	January 3, 1881	January 1, 1883	
8	4	Thomas P. Hawley	January 1, 1883	January 5, 1885	
9	7	Charles H. Belknap	January 5, 1885	January 3, 1887	
10	6	Orville R. Leonard	January 3, 1887	January 7, 1889	
11	4	Thomas P. Hawley	January 7, 1889	September 27, 1890	
12	8	Rensselaer R. Bigelow	December 2, 1890	January 5, 1891	
13	7	Charles H. Belknap	January 5, 1891	January 2, 1893	
14	9	Michael A. Murphy	January 2, 1893	January 7, 1895	
15	8	Rensselaer R. Bigelow	January 7, 1895	January 4, 1897	
16	7	Charles H. Belknap	January 4, 1897	January 2, 1899	
17	10	McKaskia Stearns Bonnifield	January 2, 1899	January 7, 1901	
18	11	William A. Massey	January 7, 1901	September 1, 1902	
19	12	Thomas V. Julien	September 15, 1902	January 5, 1903	
20	7	Charles H. Belknap	January 5, 1903	January 2, 1905	
21	13	Adolphus L. Fitzgerald	January 2, 1905	January 7, 1907	
22	14	George Frederick Talbot	January 7, 1907	January 4, 1909	
23	15	Frank H. Norcross	January 4, 1909	January 2, 1911	
24	16	James G. Sweeney	January 2, 1911	January 6, 1913	
25	14	George F. Talbot	January 6, 1913	January 4, 1915	
26	15	Frank H. Norcross	January 4, 1915	January 1, 1917	
27	17	Patrick McCarran	January 1, 1917	January 6, 1919	
28	18	Benjamin W. Coleman	January 6, 1919	January 3, 1921	
29	19	John A. Sanders	January 3, 1921	January 2, 1923	
30	20	Edward A. Ducker	January 2, 1923	January 5, 1925	
31	18	Benjamin W. Coleman	January 5, 1925	January 3, 1927	
32	19	John A. Sanders	January 3, 1927	January 4, 1929	
33	20	Edward A. Ducker	January 4, 1929	January 5, 1931	
34	18	Benjamin W. Coleman	January 5, 1931	January 2, 1933	
35	19	John A. Sanders	January 2, 1933	January 7, 1935	
36	20	Edward A. Ducker	January 7, 1935	January 4, 1937	
37	18	Benjamin W. Coleman	January 4, 1937	January 2, 1939	
38	21	E. J. L. Taber	January 2, 1939	January 6, 1941	
39	20	Edward A. Ducker	January 6, 1941	January 4, 1943	
40	22	William Edwin Orr	January 4, 1943	January 1, 1945	
41	21	E. J. L. Taber	January 1, 1945	January 6, 1947	
42	23	Edgar Eather	January 6, 1947	January 1, 1949	
43	24	Charles Lee Horsey	January 1, 1949	January 2, 1951	
44	25	Milton B. Badt	January 2, 1951	January 6, 1953	
45	23	Edgar Eather	January 6, 1953	January 4, 1955	
46	26	Charles M. Merrill	January 4, 1955	January 8, 1957	
47	25	Milton B. Badt	January 8, 1957	October 1, 1959	
48	26	Charles M. Merrill	October 1, 1959	October 1, 1959	
49	27	Frank McNamee	January 5, 1960	January 3, 1961	
50	25	Milton B. Badt	January 3, 1961	January 5, 1965	
51	27	Frank McNamee	January 5, 1965	February 17, 1965	
52	28	Gordon R. Thompson	February 17, 1965	January 7, 1969	
53	29	Jon R. Collins	January 7, 1969	January 5, 1971	
54	30	David Zenoff	January 5, 1971	January 2, 1973	
55	28	Gordon R. Thompson	January 2, 1973	January 7, 1975	
56	31	Elmer M. Gunderson	January 7, 1975	January 4, 1977	
57	32	Cameron McV. Batjer	January 4, 1977	January 4, 1979	
58	33	John C. Mowbray	January 4, 1979	January 3, 1981	
59	31	Elmer M. Gunderson	January 3, 1981	January 1, 1983	
60	34	Noel E. Manoukian	January 1, 1983	January 7, 1985	
61	35	Charles E. Springer	January 7, 1985	January 6, 1986	
62	33	John C. Mowbray	January 6, 1986	January 5, 1987	
63	31	Elmer M. Gunderson	January 5, 1987	January 2, 1989	
64	36	C. Clifton Young	January 2, 1989	January 7, 1991	
65	33	John C. Mowbray	January 7, 1991	January 4, 1993	
66	37	Robert E. Rose	January 4, 1993	January 3, 1995	
67	38	Thomas L. Steffen	January 3, 1995	January 6, 1997	
68	39	Miriam Shearing	January 6, 1997	January 5, 1998	
69	35	Charles E. Springer	January 5, 1998	January 1, 1999	
70	37	Robert E. Rose	January 1, 1999	January 2, 2001	
71	40	A. William Maupin	January 2, 2001	January 6, 2003	
72	41	Deborah Agosti	January 6, 2003	January 5, 2004	
73	39	Miriam Shearing	January 5, 2004	January 1, 2005	
74	42	Nancy A. Becker	January 1, 2005	January 1, 2006	
75	37	Robert E. Rose	January 1, 2006	January 2, 2007	
76	40	A. William Maupin	January 2, 2007	January 7, 2008	
77	43	Mark Gibbons	January 7, 2008	January 2, 2009	
78	44	James Hardesty	January 2, 2009	January 4, 2010	
79	45	Ron Parraguirre	January 4, 2010	January 3, 2011	
80	46	Michael L. Douglas	January 3, 2011	September 5, 2011	
81	47	Nancy Saitta	September 5, 2011	May 7, 2012	
82	48	Michael Cherry	May 7, 2012	January 7, 2013	
83	49	Kristina Pickering	January 7, 2013	January 6, 2014	
84	43	Mark Gibbons	January 6, 2014	January 5, 2015	
85	44	James Hardesty	January 5, 2015	January 4, 2016	
86	45	Ron Parraguirre	January 4, 2016	January 2, 2017	
87	48	Michael Cherry	January 2, 2017	January 1, 2018	
88	46	Michael L. Douglas	January 1, 2018	January 7, 2019	
89	43	Mark Gibbons	January 7, 2019	January 6, 2020	
90	49	Kristina Pickering	January 6, 2020	January 4, 2021	
91	44	James Hardesty	January 4, 2021	January 5, 2022	
92	45	Ron Parraguirre	January 5, 2022	January 2, 2023	
93	50	Lidia S. Stiglich	January 2, 2023	January 2, 2024	
94	51	Elissa F. Cadish	January 2, 2024	January 6, 2025	
95	52	Douglas W. Herndon	January 6, 2025	present	

== Sources ==
- Political History of Nevada. Chapter 6: The Nevada Judiciary
- Nevada Judicial Historical Society Memorials and Investitures
