= 2020 Nevada elections =

- November 3, 2020
- Registered: 1,822,166
- Turnout: 77.26% (▲14.8 pp)

Elections were held in Nevada on November 3, 2020. On that date, the state held elections for U.S. President, U.S. House of Representatives, Nevada Assembly, 10 of the 21 seats in the Nevada Senate, and various others. In addition, several measures were on the ballot.

To vote by mail, registered Nevada voters had to ensure each ballot was postmarked by November 3 and received by November 10, 2020.

== Federal offices ==
=== President of the United States ===
Incumbent Republican President Donald Trump was challenged by Democratic nominee Joe Biden in 2020. Prior to election day, news outlets and polls predicted Nevada to have a slight lean towards Biden. Nevada has six electoral votes in the Electoral College.

=== U.S. House of Representatives ===
Nevada has four congressional districts that elect four delegates to the U.S. House of Representatives. Since the 2016 elections, three representatives have been Democratic.

== State offices ==
=== State senate ===
10 of the 21 seats of the Nevada Senate were up for election. Democrats have retained a majority control of the senate since 2017.

=== State Assembly ===
All 42 seats of the Nevada Assembly were up for election. Democrats have retained a majority control of the assembly since 2017.

== Judiciary ==
=== Supreme Court ===
Two seats on the Nevada Supreme Court were up for election.

==== Seat B ====
2020 Nevada Supreme Court Seat B election
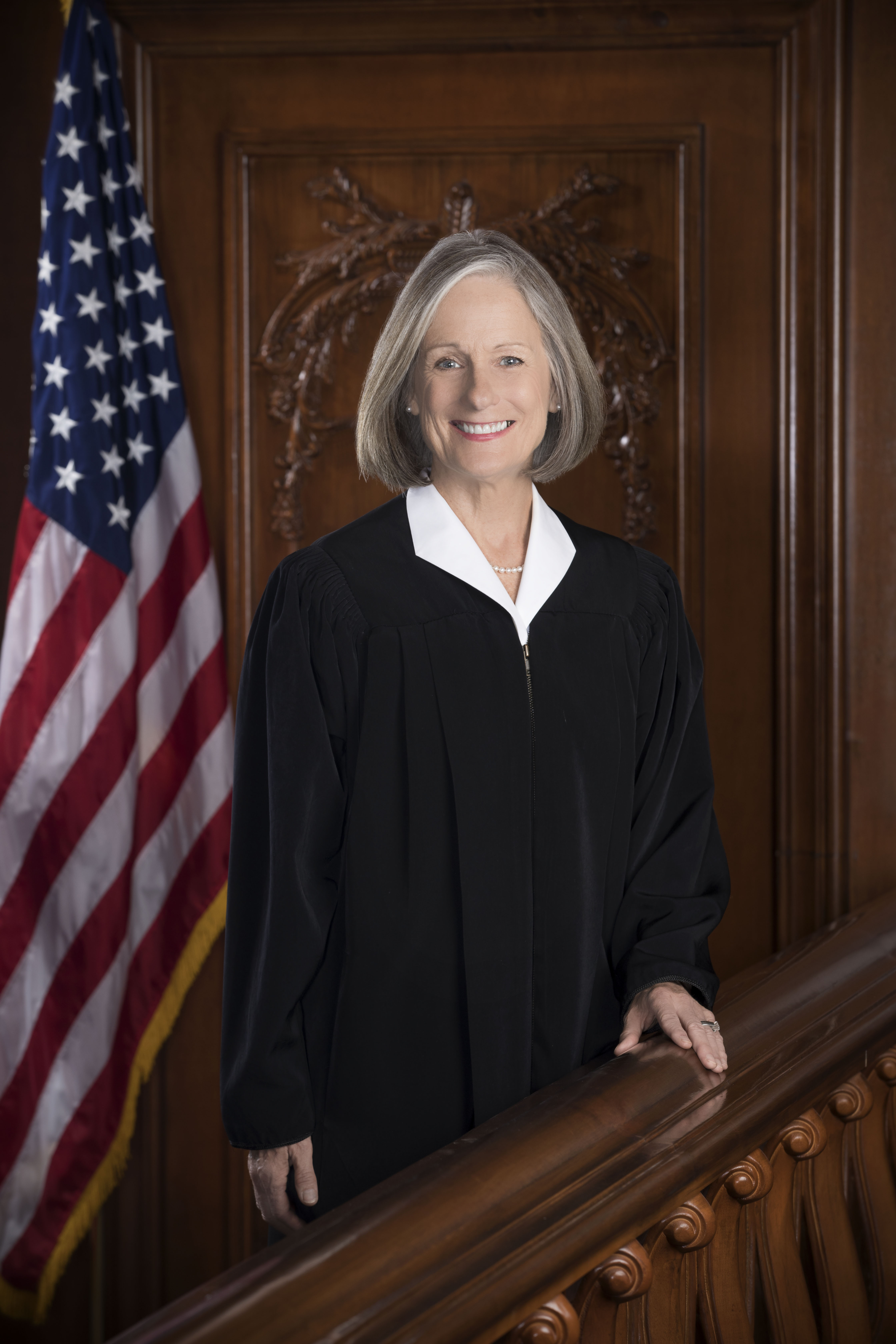
Candidate	Kristina Pickering	None of these candidates
Party	Nonpartisan
Popular vote	905,541	263,976
Percentage	77.43%	22.57%
- Pickering: 60–70% 70–80% 80–90%
Nevada Supreme Court Justice before election
Kristina Pickering
Nonpartisan
Elected Nevada Supreme Court Justice
Kristina Pickering
Nonpartisan

Incumbent justice Kristina Pickering ran for re-election. Justice Pickering was the only candidate to receive over 50% in the primary election, making her the only candidate to move onto the general election, where she was re-elected unopposed.

===== Candidates =====
- Thomas Christensen, lawyer
- Kristina Pickering, incumbent chief justice of the Nevada Supreme Court
- Esther Rodriguez, private attorney

===== Results =====
Results by county Pickering: 40–50%; 50–60%; 60–70%

2020 Nevada Supreme Court election (Seat B)
Primary election
Party	Candidate	Votes	%
Nonpartisan	Kristina Pickering (incumbent)	262,119	57.39%
Nonpartisan	Esther C. Rodriguez	101,913	22.31%
Nonpartisan	Thomas Christensen	58,421	12.79%
None of These Candidates		34,279	7.51%
Total votes		456,732	100.0%
General election
Nonpartisan	Kristina Pickering (incumbent)	905,541	77.43%
None of These Candidates		263,976	22.57%
Total votes		1,169,517	100.0%

==== Seat D ====
2020 Nevada Supreme Court Seat D election
Candidate	Douglas W. Herndon	Ozzie Fumo	None of these candidates
Party	Nonpartisan	Nonpartisan
Popular vote	557,584	445,871	225,623
Percentage	45.37%	36.28%	18.36%
- Herndon: 40–50% 50–60% 60–70%
Nevada Supreme Court Justice before election
Mark Gibbons
Nonpartisan
Elected Nevada Supreme Court Justice
Douglas W. Herndon
Nonpartisan

Incumbent justice Mark Gibbons chose to retire and not run for re-election.

===== Candidates =====
- Ozzie Fumo, state assemblyman
- Douglas Herndon, Judge of the Eight Judicial District Court (Civil/Criminal Division, Department 3)
- Erv Nelson, former state assemblyman (2014–2016)

===== Results =====
Results by county Herndon: 40–50%; 50–60%

2020 Nevada Supreme Court election (Seat D)
Primary election
Party	Candidate	Votes	%
Nonpartisan	Douglas Herndon	205,151	45.02%
Nonpartisan	Ozzie Fumo	162,364	35.63%
Nonpartisan	Erv Nelson	47,076	10.33%
None of These Candidates		41,095	9.02%
Total votes		455,686	100.0%
General election
Nonpartisan	Douglas Herndon	557,584	45.37%
Nonpartisan	Ozzie Fumo	445,871	36.28%
None of These Candidates		225,623	18.36%
Total votes		1,229,078	100.0%

=== Court of Appeals ===
One seat on the Nevada Court of Appeals was up for election.

==== Department 3 ====
Incumbent Judge Bonnie Bulla was appointed by Governor Steve Sisolak in 2019 to replace Abbi Silver, who was elected to the Nevada Supreme Court in 2018. Judge Bulla ran for re-election to serve out the remainder of Justice Silver's term, ending in 2022.

===== Candidates =====
- Bonnie A. Bulla, incumbent Judge of the Nevada Court of Appeals
- Susan Bush, criminal defense attorney

===== Results =====
2020 Nevada Court of Appeals election (Department 3)
Party	Candidate	Votes	%
Nonpartisan	Bonnie A. Bulla (incumbent)	499,827	42.17%
Nonpartisan	Susan Bush	422,377	35.63%
None of These Candidates		263,183	22.20%
Total votes		1,185,387	100.0%

== Ballot Initiatives ==
On the ballot were five statewide questions for Nevada Constitution amendments. The first one appears to be rejected while the four other questions are approved.

Question 2 repeals the struck-down same-sex marriage ban, replacing it with a gender-neutral formulation.

=== State Question 1 ===
State Question 1
- November 3, 2020
- Remove Constitutional Status of Board of Regents Amendment
Yes
50–60%
No
70–80%
60–70%

- "Remove provisions governing the election and duties of the Board of Regents and its control and management of the affairs and funds of the State University and require the Legislature to provide by law for the governance, control, and management of the State University."
- "Require the Legislature to provide by law for the reasonable protection of individual academic freedom for students, employees, and contractors of Nevada’s public higher education institutions."
- "Revise provisions governing the administration of certain funding derived under federal law and dedicated for the benefit of certain departments of the State University."

State Question No. 1
Choice	Votes	%
For	626,146	49.85
Against	630,023	50.15
Total	1,256,169	100.00

=== State Question 2 ===
- "Remove an existing provision that only a marriage between a male person and a female person may be recognized and given effect in Nevada."
- "Require that the State of Nevada and its political subdivisions must recognize marriages of and issue marriage licenses to couples regardless of gender, and that all legally valid marriages must be treated equally under the law."
- "Provide that religious organizations and members of the clergy have the right to refuse to perform a marriage, and that no person has the right to make any claim against a religious organization or member of the clergy for refusing to perform a marriage."

State Question No. 2
Choice	Votes	%
For	821,050	62.43
Against	494,186	37.57
Total	1,315,236	100.00

=== State Question 3 ===
State Question 3
- November 3, 2020
- State Board of Pardons Commissioners Amendment
Yes
60–70%
50–60%
No
60–70%
50–60%

- "Require the State Board of Pardons Commissioners—whose members are the Governor, the justices of the Nevada Supreme Court, and the Nevada Attorney General—to meet at least quarterly."
- "Authorize each member of the Board to submit matters for consideration by the Board."
- "Authorize the Board to grant pardons and make other clemency decisions by a majority vote of its members without requiring the Governor to be part of the majority of the Board that votes in favor of such decisions."

State Question No. 3
Choice	Votes	%
For	782,015	61.18
Against	496,287	38.82
Total	1,278,302	100.00

=== State Question 4 ===
State Question 4
- November 3, 2020
- State Constitutional Rights of Voters Amendment
Yes
60–70%
50–60%
No
60–70%
50–60%

"Guarantee specific voting rights to all qualified and registered voters in the State."

State Question No. 4
Choice	Votes	%
For	826,719	64.12
Against	462,544	35.88
Total	1,289,263	100.00

=== State Question 6 ===
State Question 6
- November 3, 2020
- Renewable Energy Standards Initiative
Yes
60–70%
50–60%
No
70–80%
60–70%
50–60%

"Require, beginning in calendar year 2022, that all providers of electric utility services who sell electricity to retail customers for consumption in Nevada generate or acquire incrementally larger percentages of electricity from renewable energy resources so that by calendar year 2030 not less than 50 percent of the total amount of electricity sold by each provider to its retail customers in Nevada comes from renewable energy resources."

State Question No. 6
Choice	Votes	%
For	747,581	57.94
Against	542,654	42.06
Total	1,290,235	100.00

=== Polling ===
State Question 2

Poll source	Date(s) administered	Sample size (Note: Key: A – all adults RV – registered voters LV – likely voters V – unclear)	Margin of error	Yes (for the amendment)	No (against the amendment)	Undecided
Civiqs/Daily Kos	October 17–20, 2020	712 (LV)	± 5.3%	69%	26%	5%

== See also ==
- Elections in Nevada
- Politics of Nevada
- Political party strength in Nevada
