= William Turnor Lewis =

American businessman and politician (1840–1915)

William T. Lewis
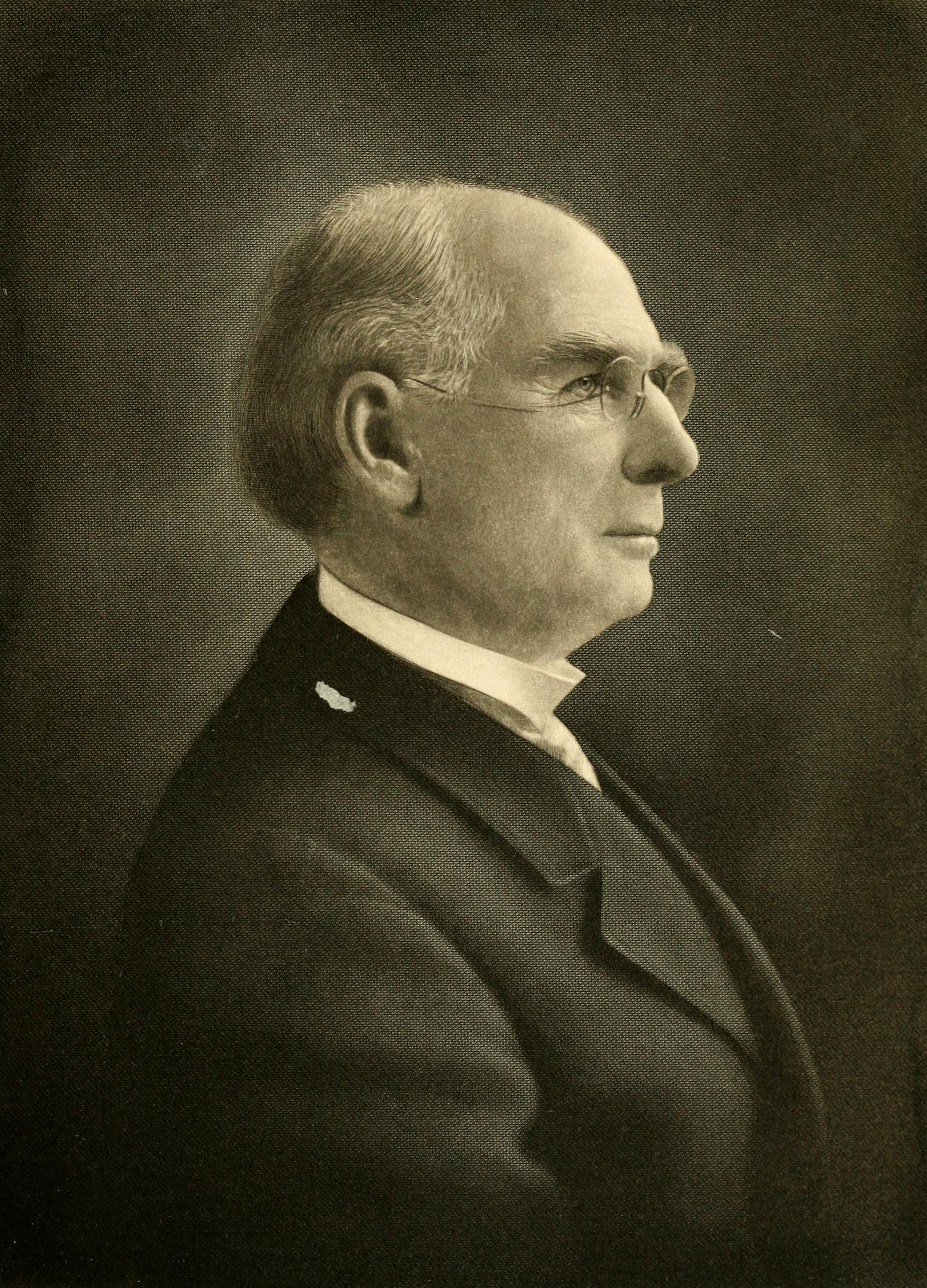
- Likeness from Racine, Belle City of the Lakes, and Racine County, Wisconsin (1916)

Member of the Wisconsin State Assembly from the Racine 1st district
- In office January 4, 1897 – January 2, 1899
- Preceded by: Charles M. Hambright
- Succeeded by: John C. Wagner

Personal details
- Born: March 10, 1840 Utica, New York, U.S.
- Died: December 30, 1915 (aged 75) Racine, Wisconsin, U.S.
- Resting place: Mound Cemetery, Racine, Wisconsin
- Spouse: Mary Isabel Mitchell (m. 1864–1915)
- Children: Mary Isabell (Mosher)^{(b. 1866; died 1941)}; William Mitchell Lewis^{(b. 1869; died 1927)}; Helen Turnor (Wilson)^{(b. 1876; died 1942)}; James Henry Lewis^{(died in infancy)}
- Relatives: James F. Lewis (brother)
- Known for: Co-founder of the Mitchell-Lewis Motor Company and the Racine Rubber Company

William Turnor Lewis (March 10, 1840 – December 30, 1915) was an American businessman, Republican politician, and Wisconsin pioneer. He was one of the founders of the Mitchell-Lewis Motor Company. He also served one term in the Wisconsin State Assembly, representing the city of Racine during the 1897 session, and was an important contributor in the establishment of the primary election system in Wisconsin.

== Biography ==
William T. Lewis was born in Utica, New York, in March 1840. He was raised and educated there and came to Wisconsin with his older brother in 1855. They settled at Racine, Wisconsin, where he would reside for the rest of his life. He studied telegraphy under his older brother, James F. Lewis, who was manager of the Racine office of the Western Union Telegraph Company. After James quit in 1861 to focus on studying law, William became manager of the Western Union office. After the outbreak of the American Civil War, he volunteered with the U.S. Military Telegraph Corps and served at the headquarters of the Union Army XV Corps until the end of the Atlanta campaign.

== Business career ==
Returning to Wisconsin in 1864, Lewis bought a one-third interest in a business partnership with Henry Mitchell, who was a successful businessman in manufacturing "Mitchell farm wagons". That same year, Lewis married Mitchell's daughter, Mary Isabel. Their partnership would continue for the rest of both men's lives, first as the Mitchell & Lewis Co. Their business flourished in part due to the high demand for new farm equipment as soldiers returned from the Civil War.

They suffered a disastrous fire at their factory in 1880, but rebuilt and endured. By 1900, their main business was producing 25,000 wagons per year. In 1903, Lewis spearheaded a new venture in manufacturing automobiles, known initially as the Lewis Motor Company, and later merged into the parent firm as the Mitchell-Lewis Motor Company. By the time of his death in 1915, the company was one of the largest manufacturing businesses in Racine and employed 2,000 people. With his son, William, he also built and managed the Racine Rubber Company, which mostly manufactured wheels for automobiles.

== Political career ==
Lewis was a lifelong member of the Republican Party of Wisconsin. He was chosen as a delegate to the 1888 Republican National Convention and to the National Tariff Commission Congress in 1909.

He was elected to the Wisconsin State Assembly in the 1896 general election and represented the city of Racine in the 1897 session of the legislature. In the Assembly, Lewis was principally concerned with two issues. First, he was interested in abolishing the use of convict labor, believing it placed free workers at a competitive disadvantage. Second, he was a strong proponent of popular nomination of political candidates through primary elections, abolishing the existing process which ran through party caucuses, dominated by party elites. He saw himself as a political ally of progressive Republican Robert M. La Follette—who had just been defeated for the Republican nomination for Governor in a party convention—and sought out his advice for advancing his priorities. Although his bill for primary elections was not passed in the 1897 session, La Follette ultimately took up the cause as his own. La Follette won election as Governor in 1900 and went on to implement the primary election law in his first year as Governor.

Rather than running for re-election in the Assembly in 1898, Lewis sought the Republican nomination for Wisconsin State Senate, but was defeated for the nomination by Kenosha County state representative John F. Reynolds.

== Personal life and legacy ==
William T. Lewis was a son of Welsh American immigrants William J. Lewis and his wife Jane (née Turnor). William's elder brother, James F. Lewis, went on to become the first chief justice of the Supreme Court of Nevada.

William married Mary Isabel Mitchell on October 27, 1864. They had four children, though one son died in infancy.

Lewis was active in Freemasonry and was a 32nd degree mason. He was also a charter member of the Racine YMCA.

Lewis died at his home at 1000 Main Street in Racine, on the morning of December 30, 1915, after an illness of several weeks.

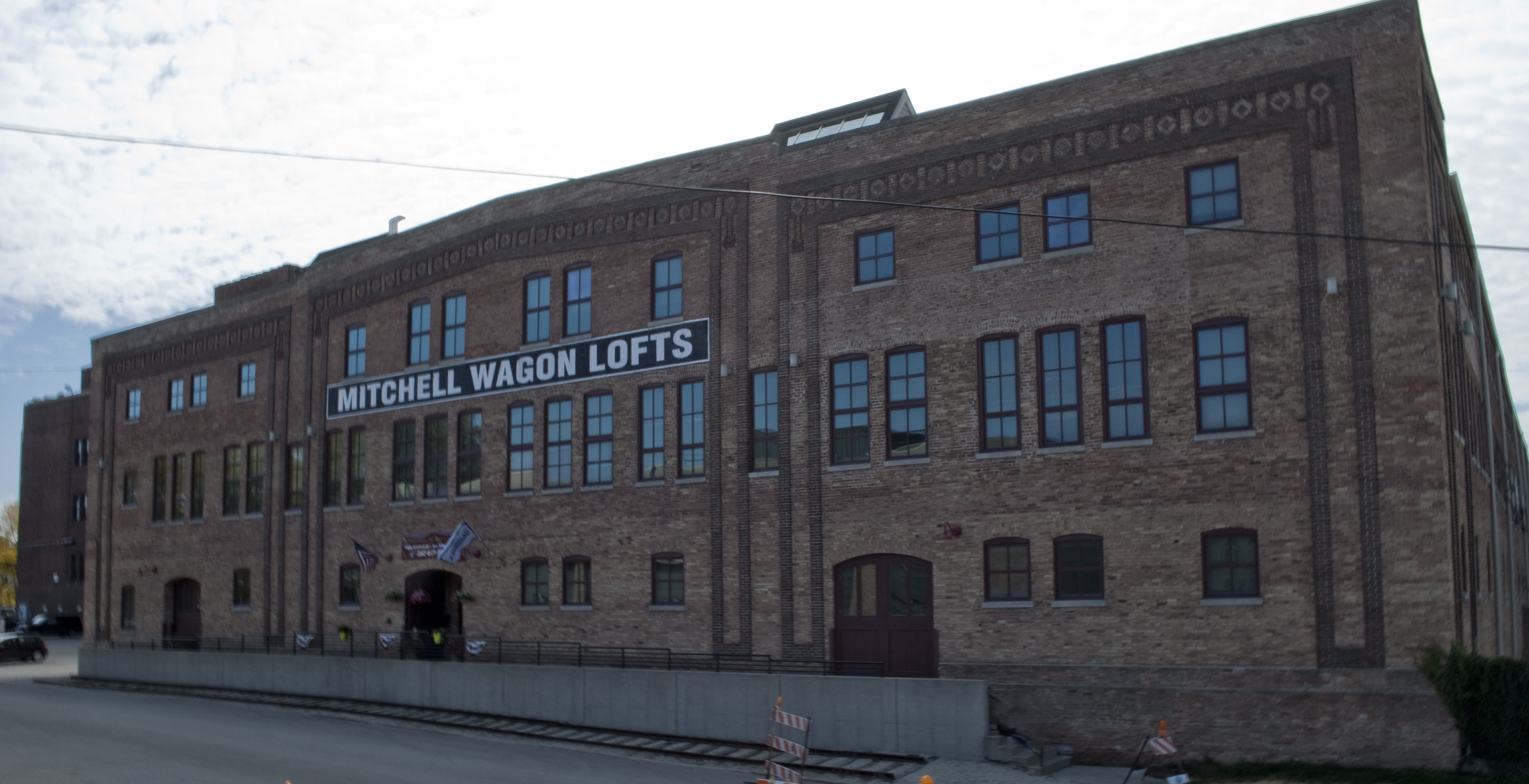
Mitchell Lewis Building in Racine.

Under Lewis, the company established a new manufacturing plant at 815 8th Street in Racine in 1910. The Lewis-Mitchell Motor Company was bought out by Nash Motors eight years after Lewis' death. The Lewis-Mitchell plant in Racine would go on to produce Nash's Ajax automobile. Nash continued to operate the plant until 1939, when they merged with the Kelvinator appliance company and created Nash-Kelvinator. The Racine plant was shut down and most of its machinery was transferred to a plant in the neighboring city Kenosha, Wisconsin.

The building still stands and was converted to apartment lofts in 2004. It is listed as the Mitchell Lewis Building in the National Register of Historic Places.

The original site of the Lewis-Mitchell Wagon Company (on 6th Street) is now the site of the Racine City Hall building.

The Racine Rubber Company later became known as the Ajax Rubber Company. The company ceased operation in 1930s, but the most lasting legacy of the company was a neighborhood of homes built by the company around their plant as a benefit for their employees in the 1910s, under the direction of Lewis and his son. The neighborhood of homes on the west side of the city of Racine is still known as "Rubberville" and is listed in the National Register of Historic Places as the Racine Rubber Company Homes Historic District.

== Electoral history ==
=== Wisconsin Assembly (1896) ===
Wisconsin Assembly, Racine 1st District Election, 1896
Party	Candidate	Votes	%	±%
General Election, November 3, 1896
Republican	William T. Lewis	3,049	57.05%	+12.02%
Democratic	Andreas Hanson	2,222	41.58%	+16.39%
Prohibition	William R. Taylor	73	1.37%	−1.04%
Plurality		827	15.48%	-2.19%
Total votes		5,344	100.0%	+13.58%
Republican hold				

=== Wisconsin Senate (1898) ===
Wisconsin Senate, 3rd District Election, 1898
Party	Candidate	Votes	%
Wisconsin 3rd Senatorial District Convention, October 5, 1898 (66th ballot)
Republican	John F. Reynolds	18	52.94%
Republican	William T. Lewis	16	47.06%
Plurality		2	5.88%
Total votes		34	100.0%

Wisconsin State Assembly
Preceded by Charles M. Hambright	Member of the Wisconsin State Assembly from the Racine 1st district January 4, 1897 – January 2, 1899	Succeeded by John C. Wagner
