= Justice Becker =

Justice Becker may refer to:

- Francis H. Becker (1915–2011), associate justice of the Iowa Supreme Court
- Nancy A. Becker (born 1955), associate justice of the Supreme Court of Nevada

== See also ==
- Judge Becker (disambiguation)
