= Horatio M. Jones =

American judge (1826–1906)

Horatio McLean Jones

Justice of the Territorial Supreme Court of Nevada
- In office 1861–1863
- Preceded by: New seat
- Succeeded by: Powhatan B. Locke

Personal details
- Born: August 26, 1826; Howellville, Pennsylvania
- Died: June 10, 1906 (aged 79); Vermontville, Michigan
- Spouse: Amenia Strong
- Children: 1 son
- Education: Oberlin College (B.A.); Harvard Law School (LL.B.)
- Occupation: Lawyer, Judge

Horatio McLean Jones (August 26, 1826 – June 10, 1906) was a justice of the Territorial Supreme Court of Nevada from 1861 to 1863.

== Biography ==
Born in Howellville, Pennsylvania, Jones received an undergraduate degree from Oberlin College in 1849, followed by an LL.B. from Harvard Law School in 1853. He entered the practice of law, and in 1856 was hired to serve as the Court Reporter for the Missouri Supreme Court.

In 1861, President Abraham Lincoln appointed Jones to the newly established Nevada Territory supreme court. Jones "left behind uncompleted work in Missouri" when he took the position, arriving in Nevada and taking the oath of office in September 1861. Jones presided over a case resulting in "an unpopular jury verdict in the one-ledge, many-ledge, case about the Comestock Lode", which led to an effort by the territorial legislature to change the jurisdiction to which Jones was assigned. Jones "said he would not practice the kind of law practiced there", and "walked out of court and would not hear any more cases during the May term of 1863". Because Jones thereafter "failed to hold court", he "developed a reputation for inaction and 'wrong headedness'; as a result he became unpopular". He resigned from the office on August 1, 1863, and was succeeded in the position by Powhatan B. Locke.

Jones then moved to Austin, Nevada, where he opened a law practice. He made speeches in support of the adoption of the Nevada Constitution in 1864, switching parties during that time and becoming a Democrat.

He moved to California after 1866, and to St. Louis, Missouri, in 1868. He served as a Missouri district court judge from 1871 to 1877, and then "practiced law until 1884, when he became too ill to work".

Jones married Amenia Strong of Livingston, New York, in 1851. They had a son, Horatio McLean Jones Jr., who was born in 1868 and died in 1875. Jones died in Vermontville, Michigan, at the age of 79.

Political offices
Preceded by Newly established court	Justice of the Supreme Court of Nevada; 1861–1864	Succeeded by Powhatan B. Locke
