= E. M. Gunderson =

E. M. Gunderson may refer to:

- Einar Maynard Gunderson (1899-1980), Canadian accountant and politician
- Elmer Millard Gunderson (1929-2010), American judge
