= Robert E. Rose =

American judge (1939–2022)

66th and 70th Chief Justice of the Supreme Court of Nevada
- In office January 1, 2006 – January 1, 2007
- Preceded by: Charles E. Springer
- Succeeded by: A. William Maupin
- In office January 4, 1993 – January 3, 1995
- Preceded by: John Code Mowbray
- Succeeded by: Thomas L. Steffen

Justice of the Supreme Court of Nevada Seat C
- In office 1989–2007
- Preceded by: Elmer Millard Gunderson
- Succeeded by: Michael Cherry

26th Lieutenant Governor of Nevada
- In office January 6, 1975 – January 1, 1979
- Governor: Mike O'Callaghan
- Preceded by: Harry Reid
- Succeeded by: Myron E. Leavitt

Member of the Nevada Assembly from the 4th district
- In office 1971 – January 1, 1979
- Preceded by: Harry Reid
- Succeeded by: Myron E. Leavitt

Personal details
- Born: October 7, 1939 Orange, New Jersey, U.S.
- Died: February 14, 2022 (aged 82) Reno, Nevada, U.S.
- Party: Democratic
- Education: Livingston High School
- Alma mater: Juniata College; New York University School of Law

Robert Edgar Rose (October 7, 1939 – February 14, 2022) was an American politician. A member of the Democratic Party, he was the 26th lieutenant governor of Nevada from 1975 to 1979 and was the party's nominee for Governor of Nevada in 1978. In 1986, Rose was appointed to the Eighth Judicial District Court. He was elected three times to the Nevada Supreme Court serving from 1989 to 2007.

== Early life and education ==
Rose was born in Orange, New Jersey, on October 7, 1939, and raised in Livingston, New Jersey. He graduated from Livingston High School in 1957, Juniata College in 1963 and New York University School of Law in 1964. He was president of the first graduating class at Livingston High School and was inducted into the school's hall of fame in 1994.

== Death ==
Rose died in Reno, Nevada, on February 14, 2022, at the age of 82.

Party political offices
| Preceded by Mike O'Callaghan | Democratic nominee for Governor of Nevada; 1978 | Succeeded by Richard Bryan |
Political offices
| Preceded by Harry Reid | Lieutenant Governor of Nevada; 1975–1979 | Succeeded by Myron E. Leavitt |
