= Charles Lee Horsey =

American judge (1880–1958)

Justice of the Nevada Supreme Court
- In office 1945–1951
- Appointed by: Vail Pittman
- Preceded by: William Edwin Orr
- Succeeded by: Charles Merton Merrill

Nevada Senate
- In office 1913–1915
- In office 1939–1940

Personal details
- Born: December 23, 1880 Laurel, Delaware
- Died: March 30, 1958 (aged 77) Santa Barbara, California
- Party: Democratic
- Education: University of Virginia

Charles Lee Horsey (December 23, 1880 – March 30, 1958) was a justice of the Supreme Court of Nevada from 1945 to 1951.

== Early life and education ==
Horsey was born in Laurel, Delaware on December 23, 1880. Horsey spent most of his early life in Philadelphia, where his family moved when he was five years old. He then attended the University of Virginia and received an L.L.B. in 1904. He married Margaret Woodruff Hitch on September 7, 1903, and they had four children.

== Career ==
Horsey served as District Attorney of Lincoln County from 1906 to 1908 and then was elected State Senator. While in the Senate he chaired the judiciary committee and wrote several statutes that tightened mine safety laws.

Horsey was elected as District Judge of the Tenth Judicial District in 1915, but did not seek re-election in order to serve as president of the Virginia-Louise Mining Company from 1917 through 1922. In 1928, Mr. Horsey was the Democratic nominee for representative in congress. He was elected again to the state senate, representing Clark County, in 1939.

In 1945, Horsey briefly served as a Judge on the Eighth Judicial District in Clark County before Governor Vail Pittman appointed him to the Supreme Court vacancy created by the resignation of William Edwin Orr. In 1946 he was elected for a full six-year term on the court. He was defeated in his re-election campaign by Republican attorney Charles Merton Merrill.

== Death ==
Horsey died in Santa Barbara, California on March 30, 1958.

Political offices
Preceded by William Edwin Orr	Justice of the Supreme Court of Nevada; 1945–1951	Succeeded by Charles Merton Merrill
