= Hambright =

Hambright is a surname. Notable people with the surname include:

- Charles M. Hambright (1845–1938), American businessman and politician
- Frederick Hambright (1727–1817), American military officer
- Pat Hambright (born 1967), American journalist
- Roger Hambright (1949–2023), American baseball player
