= Bernard C. Whitman =

American judge (1827–1885)

Bernard Crosby Whitman

Justice of the Supreme Court of Nevada
- In office 1868–1875
- Preceded by: Henry O. Beatty
- Succeeded by: William H. Beatty

Personal details
- Born: October 25, 1827 Waltham, Massachusetts
- Died: August 5, 1885 (aged 57) San Francisco, California
- Spouse: Mary Elizabeth Church (m. 1857)
- Children: Crosby Church Whitman
- Education: Harvard College
- Occupation: Lawyer, Judge

Bernard Crosby Whitman (October 25, 1827 – August 5, 1885) was a justice of the Supreme Court of Nevada from 1868 to 1875.

Born in Waltham, Massachusetts, Whitman was the son of attorney Levi Whitman of Norway, Maine, and the nephew of Ezekiel Whitman, who was chief justice of the Maine Supreme Judicial Court.

Whitman completed a degree at Harvard College in 1846, and read law with the Portland, Maine firm of Fessenden & Deblois. He moved to San Francisco, California, in 1850, where he "practiced law and politics". He married Mary Elizabeth Church on July 14, 1857, and moved to Virginia City, Nevada in 1864. Appointed to the Nevada Supreme Court in 1868, he served as chief justice from 1873 to 1874.

Whitman "returned to California in 1882", and died in San Francisco in 1885 at the age of 57. Whitman's son Crosby Church Whitman completed a degree at Harvard in 1886, becoming a doctor. Crosby died in Paris, France, during World War I, under the strain of practicing medicine during the war.

Political offices
Preceded by Henry O. Beatty	Justice of the Supreme Court of Nevada; 1868–1875	Succeeded by William H. Beatty
