= Edward A. Ducker =

American judge (1870–1946)

Edward Augustus Ducker

Justice of the Supreme Court of Nevada
- In office 1919–1946
- Preceded by: Pat McCarran
- Succeeded by: Edgar Eather

Personal details
- Born: February 26, 1870; Visalia, California
- Died: August 14, 1946 (aged 76); Carson City, Nevada
- Spouse: Dollie B. Guthrie
- Children: 1 son, 1 daughter
- Occupation: Lawyer, Judge

Edward Augustus Ducker (February 26, 1870 – August 14, 1946) was a justice of the Supreme Court of Nevada from 1919 until his death in 1946.

== Early life and career ==
Born in Visalia, California to Benjamin Franklin and Augusta Ducker, Ducker came to Nevada at the age of 17 and worked for a time on a Humboldt County, Nevada, cattle ranch. Ducker was "without the advantages of an early education", but "applied himself and finally took up the study of law". He passed the bar examination in 1902 and entered the practice of law in Winnemucca, Nevada. He was elected district attorney of Humboldt County, Nevada, in 1904. He remained in that position until his election to a seat on the Nevada Sixth Judicial District in 1910, which he won handily, receiving more votes than his other two opponents combined.

== Judicial service ==
As a district court judge, Ducker "decided many of the most important mining suits that have clustered the courts of Nevada for years", and in 1914 "was prominently mentioned as a candidate for the supreme court of Nevada", though he ultimately chose not to run at that time, instead running unopposed for reelection to his district court seat.

In 1918, Ducker ran for a seat on the Nevada supreme court, waging "an energetic campaign... throughout the state", and defeating incumbent Pat McCarran by a vote of 12,101 to 11,566 to win the election. Ducker subsequently ran unopposed in 1924, 1930, 1936, and 1942, remaining on the supreme court until his death in 1946. He served several stints as Chief Justice of the court.

== Personal life and death ==
On March 10, 1903, Ducker married Dollie B. Guthrie of Humboldt County, with whom he had a son and a daughter. Ducker was an avid hunter and fisherman, and "spent much time horseback riding".

Ducker died at his home in Carson City, Nevada, from cardiovascular disease, at the age of 76.

Political offices
Preceded by Pat McCarran	Justice of the Supreme Court of Nevada; 1919–1946	Succeeded by Edgar Eather
