= McKaskia Stearns Bonnifield =

American judge (1833–1913)

Justice of the Supreme Court of Nevada
- In office 1895–1901
- Preceded by: Michael A. Murphy
- Succeeded by: Adolphus L. Fitzgerald

Personal details
- Born: September 14, 1833 West Virginia
- Died: July 15, 1913 (aged 79) Winnemucca, Nevada
- Spouse(s): Martha J. Myers (m. 1859; died 1892); Nellie Lovelock (m. 1889)
- Children: 5
- Education: Allegheny College
- Occupation: Lawyer, Judge

McKaskia Stearns "Mack" Bonnifield (September 14, 1833 – July 15, 1913) was a justice of the Supreme Court of Nevada from 1895 to 1901.

== Early life, education, and career ==
Born in West Virginia, one of 15 children in his family, Bonnifield attended Allegheny College in Meadville, Pennsylvania. After graduation, he was elected president of Richard College, in which capacity he served a year. He moved to Kansas, where he read law and was admitted-to the bar. He joined, the Free Soil Party and "became a prominent Free Soil politician", winning election to the Kansas Senate. He then went to Ottumwa, Iowa, where he practiced law until he "with his young wife crossed the plains in 1861, going to Red Bluff, California". He remained there for a year, but "was attracted to Nevada by the rich mineral discoveries", moving to Unionville, Nevada, in June, 1862, where he opened a law office.

== Nevada political career ==
Bonnifield delivered the first Fourth of July oration in Unionville, Nevada, in 1862, and spoke again 50 years later, on the Fourth of July, 1912. Following a January 1869 riot against Chinese laborers, Bonnifield "was successful at having the charges dropped while pointing out that mob action was not the solution to the 'Chinese problem'". Bonnifield than "proposed to the Nevada state legislature a law banning Chinese laborers from Nevada altogether", which failed due to railroad projects that were heavily dependent on such laborers. Bonnifield himself served two terms in the Nevada Senate, from November 1868 to November 1872. There, Bonnifield "became a strong advocate of woman suffrage in an era when conservative resistance continued to block enactment in Nevada". Notably, Bonnifield, along with his younger brother William, later "learned to be more tolerant of the Chinese and even bought property from and leased and sold property to them in Humboldt County".

Although a longtime member of the Democratic Party, by the 1890s he had become active in organizing the Silver Party in Nevada, and in the 1892 United States presidential election, when Populist Party James B. Weaver won Nevada in an alliance with the Silver Party, Bonnifield was named as a presidential elector and carried to Washington the ballots of the three electors for the state, engraved on plates of silver. In October 1894, Bonnifield was nominated by the Nevada Silver Party for a seat on the state supreme court. Days before the election, Bonnifield's brother William surprisingly switched parties, joining the Republican Party. Bonnifield himself remained with the Silver Party and was elected to the court, taking office in 1895, and serving for six years.

Following his service on the court, Bonnifield went to Tonopah, Nevada, during a silver rush there, and practiced law, accumulating a fortune in stock speculation, which was later lost. He returned to Winnemucca and resumed the practice of law until his death. In Winnemucca, Bonnifield practiced for a time in partnership with Thomas A. Brandon, speaker of Nevada Assembly, under the firm name of Bonnifield and Brandon.

== Personal life and death ==
Bonnifield was joined by his wife in the summer of 1861, and they made their home in Humboldt County, Nevada, until the death of Mrs. Bonnifield in 1887. In 1889 Bonnifield married Nellie Lovelock, widow of George Lovelock Jr., founder of the town of Lovelock, and they thereafter made their home in Winnemucca.

Bonnifield died in his home at 2 o'clock in the morning at the age of 79, after being unconscious for 24 hours following an illness of three weeks.

Political offices
Preceded by Michael A. Murphy	Justice of the Supreme Court of Nevada; 1895–1901	Succeeded by Adolphus L. Fitzgerald
