= Edgar Eather =

American judge (1886–1968)

Justice of the Supreme Court of Nevada
- In office 1946–1958
- Preceded by: Edward A. Ducker
- Succeeded by: Frank McNamee

Personal details
- Born: September 14, 1886 Eureka, Nevada
- Died: September 1, 1968 (aged 81) Reno, Nevada
- Spouse: Rose Tognoni (m. 1918)
- Children: 4 daughters
- Occupation: Lawyer, Judge

Edgar Eather (September 14, 1886 – September 1, 1968) was a justice of the Supreme Court of Nevada from 1946 to 1958.

Born in Eureka, Nevada, Eather served as Eureka County recorder and auditor from 1911 to 1922. In June 1922, he was elected to the Nevada Republican State Committee. Later in 1922, he was elected Eureka County district attorney, taking office on January 2, 1923. His first act in office was to travel to Reno, Nevada, with the Eureka County sheriff to take custody of two suspects in the murder of a prohibition enforcement officer. In the fall of 1923, Eather was offered an appointment as second assistant United States Attorney for the District of Nevada, but ultimately declined the appointment to remain in his state office.

Eather was appointed to a vacant Nevada state district court seat in 1929, and was reelected in 1930, 1934, 1938, and 1942. He opted not to run for reelection in 1946, and considered running for a seat on the state supreme court, but chose not to, and rebuffed a movement to draft him into the election. However, following the death of Justice Edward A. Ducker, Governor Vail M. Pittman appointed Eather to that vacancy. Eather retired from the supreme court on December 15, 1958.

Eather married Rose Tognini in November 1918, with whom he had four daughters. Eather died in a hospital in Reno at the age of 81.

Political offices
Preceded by Edward A. Ducker	Justice of the Supreme Court of Nevada; 1946–1958	Succeeded by Frank McNamee
