= Powhatan B. Locke =

American judge (c. 1828–1868)

Justice of the Territorial Supreme Court of Nevada
- In office August 1863 – August 1864
- Preceded by: Horatio M. Jones
- Succeeded by: Court abolished due to statehood

Mayor of Savannah, Missouri
- In office 1854–1855

Personal details
- Born: c. 1828 Kentucky
- Died: June 12, 1868 Louisiana, Missouri
- Spouse: Tabitha
- Children: 4
- Occupation: Lawyer, Judge

Powhatan B. Locke (c. 1828 – June 12, 1868) was a justice of the Territorial Supreme Court of Nevada from August 1863 to August 1864.

Born in Kentucky, Locke's family moved to Missouri, where Locke entered the practice of law by 1850. He was elected mayor of Savannah, Missouri, in 1854, and reelected him in 1855. From 1862 to 1863, he served as the presiding judge in the county court in St. Joseph, Missouri.

In August, 1863, President Abraham Lincoln appointed Locke to a seat on the Territorial Supreme Court of Nevada vacated by the resignation of Justice Horatio M. Jones. The appointment was understood to be temporary, with Locke taking the oath of office in October 1963, and receiving his commission in January 1864.

As a judge, Locke rode circuit around a district comprising the counties of Storey, Washoe, and Roop. According to one account, "Locke drifted from parties and conferences with the representatives of one company to dinners and meetings with the minions of the other. Just when the Potosi thought it had won his vote he would be off with William Stewart and the other lawyers for the Chollar." Locke was described aas "obviously unfit for any position of responsibility." Accused of corruption, Locke and his fellow justices resigned from the court in August 1864.

Locke and his wife Tabitha had four children. Locke died of consumption in Louisiana, Missouri, around the age of 40.

Political offices
Preceded by Horatio M. Jones	Justice of the Territorial Supreme Court of Nevada; 1863–1864	Succeeded by Court abolished due to statehood
