= George Turner (Nevada judge) =

American judge (1828–1885)

George Enoch Turner

Chief Justice of the Territorial Supreme Court of Nevada
- In office 1861–1864
- Preceded by: New seat
- Succeeded by: Court abolished due to statehood

Personal details
- Born: December 5, 1828 Ohio
- Died: August 1885 San Francisco, California
- Education: Wesleyan University
- Occupation: Lawyer, Judge

George Enoch Turner (December 5, 1828 – August 1885) was a justice of the Territorial Supreme Court of Nevada from 1861 to 1864.

Born in Ohio, Turner studied at Wesleyan University in Connecticut, and read law with an Ohio attorney to gain admission to the bar in 1849. In 1855, he was elected County Solicitor of Scioto County, Ohio.

In 1861, President Abraham Lincoln appointed Turner as the first chief justice of the Territorial Supreme Court of Nevada, taking office in September of that year. Several years into his tenure, he was accused of "demanding payment from litigants for a favorable decision", with these allegations being published in the local news in July 1864, leading to Turner's resignation (along with his fellow justices) the following month. He moved to San Francisco, California, where he "maintained a busy practice", including several appearances before the Supreme Court of California.

Turner committed suicide a hotel in San Francisco at the age of 56, "shooting himself in the head with his ivory-handled, five-shooter pistol".

He was buried in Mountain View Cemetery in Almeda County, California.

Political offices
Preceded by Newly established court	Chief Justice of the Territorial Supreme Court of Nevada; 1861–1864	Succeeded by Court abolished due to statehood
