= Cornelius M. Brosnan =

American judge

Justice of the Supreme Court of Nevada
- In office December 5, 1864 – April 21, 1867
- Preceded by: New seat
- Succeeded by: J. Neely Johnson

Personal details
- Born: 1813 County Kerry, Ireland
- Died: April 21, 1867 (aged 54) Santa Clara County, California
- Education: Maynooth University
- Occupation: Lawyer, Judge

Cornelius M. Brosnan (1813 – April 21, 1867) was a justice of the Supreme Court of Nevada from 1864 until shortly before his death in 1867.

Born in County Kerry, Ireland, he entered Maynooth University at the age of fourteen, and remained there for four years. In 1831, at the age of 18, Brosnan emigrated to the United States to work as a science teacher, and in 1851 he moved to San Francisco, California. He moved to Virginia City, Nevada, in 1863, where he served in the convention that drew up the constitution of the state for its admission to statehood the following year. Brosnan was then elected to the Nevada Supreme Court, where he served until 1867, when he returned to California, remaining there until his death that same year in Santa Clara County, California.

Political offices
Preceded by Newly established seat	Justice of the Supreme Court of Nevada; 1864–1867	Succeeded by J. Neely Johnson
