= James G. Sweeney =

American judge

Justice of the Supreme Court of Nevada
- In office 1907–1913
- Preceded by: Adolphus L. Fitzgerald
- Succeeded by: Pat McCarran

Nevada Attorney General
- In office 1902–1907
- Preceded by: William Woodburn
- Succeeded by: Richard L. H. Williams

Personal details
- Born: January 24, 1877 Carson City, Nevada
- Died: July 6, 1917 (aged 40) Oakland, California
- Spouse(s): Mable Trembath (m. 1902; div. 1914); Nan Patterson (m. 1916; div. 1917)
- Education: Saint Mary's College of California, Columbia University School of Law
- Occupation: Lawyer, Judge, Politician

James G. Sweeney (January 24, 1877 – July 6, 1917) was an American attorney and politician who served as the Nevada Attorney General from 1902 to 1907, and a justice of the Supreme Court of Nevada from 1907 to 1913.

== Early life, education, and career ==
Born in Carson City, Nevada to Mr. and Mrs. E. D. Sweeney, Nevada pioneers, Sweeney attended the local schools and worked in the mines in Carson City, where he became popular with the miners, a popularity that would serve him well in his later political life. He received a B.A. from Saint Mary's College of California in Oakland, thereafter reading law to gain admission to the Nevada State Bar on July 30, 1898, at the age of 21. Already admitted to the practice of law, he then attended the Columbia University School of Law in Washington, D.C., from which he "graduated with high honors".

== Political and judicial career ==
Sweeney entered politics, winning the November 1900 election to represent Ormsby County, Nevada, in the Nevada Assembly, in the 20th Nevada State Legislative Session beginning in 1901. On November 4, 1902, at the age of 26, Sweeney was elected as the thirteenth Nevada Attorney General, making him the youngest state attorney general in the history of the United States to that date. Sweeney was elected as a Silver-Democrat, receiving 6,268 (56.6%) votes against Republican Samuel Platt, who received 4,797 (43.4%) votes. In 1905, the Nevada State Legislature enacted the first legislation allowing the Nevada Attorney General to hire a full-time staff employee; Sweeney then brought on his younger sister Margaret Sweeney to serve as his stenographer.

Four years later, on November 6, 1906, he won the election to become the youngest state supreme court justice in the country with his election to the Nevada Supreme Court. An obituary noted:

Ten decisions handed down by Judge Sweeney were published by the American and English Leading Cases, a law volume of almost universal use through English speaking countries, to illustrate various legal principles. Law magazines also made frequent reference to cases decided by him.

As a leading democrat of the state, Sweeney was prominently identified in the various democratic conventions, presiding over many of the state meetings. He was chairman of the combined parties in the coalition of democratic and silver parties, and for several years was chairman of the Nevada state central committee. Sweeney was defeated in a race for the United States Senate in 1910 by incumbent George S. Nixon, and thereafter served as chief justice of the Nevada Supreme Court until illness forced him to retire in 1913. Sweeney then established a private law practice in Reno and Carson City with state senator H. V. Morehouse.

== Personal life and death ==
On December 14, 1902, Sweeney married Mable Trembath of Virginia City, Nevada, with whom he had several children. They divorced on December 30, 1914. Sweeney married Nan Patterson in 1916, but obtained a divorce the following year on the grounds of desertion.

Sweeney died from pernicious anemia at his sister's home in Oakland, California, after an illness of six months, at the age of 40. His body was transported back to Carson City for burial.

Political offices
Preceded by Adolphus L. Fitzgerald	Justice of the Supreme Court of Nevada; 1907–1913	Succeeded by Pat McCarran
