= Milton Benjamin Badt =

American judge (1884–1966)

Justice of the Supreme Court of Nevada
- In office March 26, 1947 – April 2, 1966
- Preceded by: Erroll James Livingston Taber
- Succeeded by: Jon R. Collins

Personal details
- Born: November 29, 1884 San Francisco, California, U.S.
- Died: April 2, 1966 (aged 81)
- Spouse: Gertrude
- Children: 2
- Profession: Judge

Milton Benjamin Badt (1884 – April 2, 1966) was a justice of the Supreme Court of Nevada from 1947 to 1966.

His family was Orthodox Jewish and his father immigrated from Polish Prussia. Badt was born in San Francisco and studied in California but established his practice in Elko, Nevada, where his parents lived. He had a wife Gertrude and two children. He was a Republican.

He was appointed March 26, 1947 to fill E. L. J. Taber's vacancy and elected November 1948 to fulfill the rest of his unexpired term

Badt suffered a heart attack in March 1966 at the age of 81, and died the following month. Jon R. Collins was appointed June 5, 1966 to succeed him.

Political offices
Preceded by E. J. L. Taber	Justice of the Supreme Court of Nevada; 1947–1966	Succeeded by Jon R. Collins
