= Windham, Iowa =

- Unincorporated community
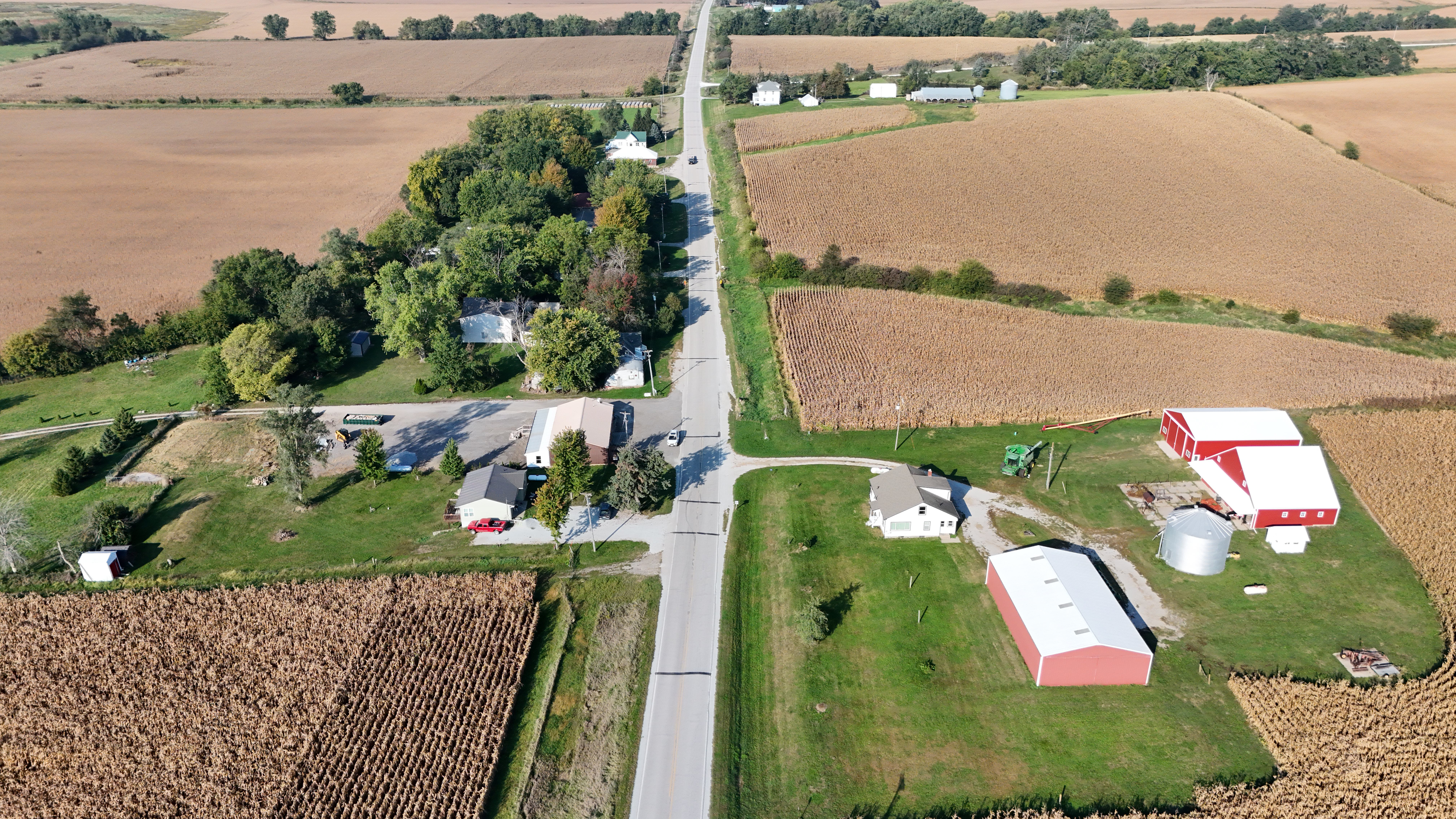
- Windham, looking west along Black Diamond Road

- Location within Iowa Location within the United States
- Coordinates: 41°36′32″N 91°45′44″W
- Country: United States
- State: Iowa
- County: Johnson
- Elevation: 712 ft (217 m)
- Time zone: UTC-6 (Central (CST))
  - Summer (DST): UTC-5 (CDT)
- Area code: 319
- GNIS feature ID: 463122

Windham is an unincorporated community in Johnson County, Iowa, United States.

== History ==
Windham was platted in 1854. Windham's population was 38 in 1902, and 35 in 1925. The population was 33 in 1940.

== Notable person ==
- Willam Healy, United States Circuit Court of Appeals judge, was born in Windham.
