= Frank McNamee =

American judge (1906–1968)

Justice of the Supreme Court of Nevada
- In office 1958–1965
- Preceded by: Edgar Eather
- Succeeded by: David Zenoff

Personal details
- Born: 1906; Pioche, Lincoln County, Nevada
- Died: November 4, 1968; Las Vegas, Nevada
- Political party: Republican
- Education: Stanford Law School
- Occupation: Lawyer, Judge

Frank McNamee (1906 – November 4, 1968) was a justice of the Supreme Court of Nevada from 1958 to 1965.

== Early life, education, military service, and career ==
Born into a prominent Nevada family in Pioche, Lincoln County, Nevada, McNamee received his law degree from Stanford Law School in 1930. After serving as a Municipal Judge of the City of Las Vegas from 1930 to 1933, he entered private practice in 1933. Active in the state Republican Party, he was the Republican candidate for lieutenant governor in 1938, losing to Maurice J. Sullivan. When World War II began, he joined the United States Army as a private, achieving the rank of Lieutenant Colonel in the Judge Advocate General's Corps during four years of service.

== Appellate judicial service and home invasion attack ==
On July 11, 1946, McNamee was appointed to Nevada's Eighth Judicial District Court, and on December 15, 1958, outgoing Governor Charles H. Russell elevated McNamee to a seat on the state supreme court vacated by the resignation of Justice Edgar Eather. The appointment was approved by incoming Governor Grant Sawyer. McNamee was reelected to his seat in 1960, losing 16 of Nevada's then-17 counties, but winning a large enough victory in Clark County to win the election.

On February 17, 1965, McNamee was attacked and severely beaten in his home during a robbery, "a tragic criminal assault from which he never recovered", causing him to resign from the court. McNamee remained in intensive care for three months before being transferred to his home, and Judge David Zenoff was appointed to fill the remainder of his term on the supreme court. A man named Phillippe Denning was arrested for the attack the following day, having ditched McNamee's stolen car in a town in Missouri and made his way to St. Louis. Denning was committed to the Nevada State Hospital pending a hearing on his sanity, ultimately pleading guilty to attempted manslaughter and receiving a one-to-five year sentence.

McNamee died in Las Vegas three years later, at the age of 62.

Political offices
Preceded by Edgar Eather	Justice of the Supreme Court of Nevada; 1958–1965	Succeeded by David Zenoff
