= William Healy (judge) =

American judge (1881–1962)

Senior Judge of the United States Court of Appeals for the Ninth Circuit
- In office November 30, 1958 – March 15, 1962

Judge of the United States Court of Appeals for the Ninth Circuit
- In office June 21, 1937 – November 30, 1958
- Appointed by: Franklin D. Roosevelt
- Preceded by: Seat established by 50 Stat. 64
- Succeeded by: Charles Merton Merrill

Personal details
- Born: William Healy; September 10, 1881 Windham, Iowa, U.S.
- Died: March 15, 1962 (aged 80)
- Education: University of Iowa (BA, LLB)

William Healy (September 10, 1881 – March 15, 1962) was a United States circuit judge of the United States Court of Appeals for the Ninth Circuit.

== Education and career ==
Born in Windham, Iowa, Healy received an Artium Baccalaureus degree from the University of Iowa in 1906 and graduated from the University of Iowa College of Law in 1908. He was in private practice in Silver City, Idaho, from 1909 to 1913, also serving as a prosecuting attorney of Owyhee County, Idaho, from 1911 to 1912. He was a member of the Idaho House of Representatives in 1913. He was in private practice in Boise, Idaho, from 1914 to 1934, and was general counsel to the Farm Credit Administration in Spokane, Washington from 1934 to 1937.

== Federal judicial service ==
On June 8, 1937, Healy was nominated by President Franklin D. Roosevelt to a new seat on the United States Court of Appeals for the Ninth Circuit created by 50 Stat. 64. He was confirmed by the United States Senate on June 15, 1937, and received his commission on June 21, 1937. He assumed senior status on November 30, 1958, serving in that capacity until his death on March 15, 1962.

== Sources ==
Legal offices
Preceded by Seat established by 50 Stat. 64	Judge of the United States Court of Appeals for the Ninth Circuit; 1937–1958	Succeeded by Charles Merton Merrill
