= Thomas L. Steffen =

American judge (1930–2020)

Chief Justice of the Nevada Supreme Court
- In office January 3, 1995 – January 5, 1997
- Preceded by: Robert E. Rose
- Succeeded by: Miriam Shearing

Justice of the Nevada Supreme Court (Seat B)
- In office April 26, 1982 – January 5, 1997
- Preceded by: Cameron McVicar Batjer
- Succeeded by: A. William Maupin

Personal details
- Born: July 9, 1930 Tremonton, Utah, U.S.
- Died: September 1, 2020 (aged 90) Hendersonville, Tennessee, U.S.

Thomas Lee Steffen (July 9, 1930 – September 1, 2020) was a justice of the Supreme Court of Nevada from 1982 to 1997, serving as chief justice from 1995 to 1997. He graduated with honors from George Washington University Law School in 1964, where he began his career as a contract negotiator for the Bureau of Naval Weapons. After retirement from the Supreme Court in 1997, he practiced law with the Hutchison & Steffen law firm.

Steffen was born in Tremonton, Utah and went to Bear Creek High School. He was a lifelong member of The Church of Jesus Christ of Latter-day Saints.
