= Adolphus L. Fitzgerald =

American judge (1840–1921)

Adolphus Leigh Fitzgerald

Justice of the Supreme Court of Nevada
- In office 1901–1907
- Preceded by: McKaskia Stearns Bonnifield
- Succeeded by: James G. Sweeney

Personal details
- Born: October 24, 1840; Rockingham County, North Carolina
- Died: August 31, 1921 (aged 80); Boston, Massachusetts
- Children: Robert Fitzgerald
- Education: University of North Carolina (B.A., M.A.)
- Occupation: Lawyer, Judge

Adolphus Leigh Fitzgerald (October 24, 1840 – August 31, 1921) was a justice of the Supreme Court of Nevada from 1901 to 1907.

Born in Rockingham County, North Carolina, he received a B.A. and an M.A. from the University of North Carolina, and served in the Confederate States Army during the American Civil War, taking part in the Battle of the Wilderness, the Siege of Petersburg, and the defense of Richmond.

At the close of the war he went to California and became teacher of Latin and Greek in the Pacific Methodist College in Vacaville. He served for a time as deputy state superintendent of schools and was later elected president of the college, which had removed to Santa Cruz, California, remaining in that office for five years. He gained admission to the bar in California in January 1878, and moved to Eureka, Nevada. There he entered into the private practice of law until 1887, when he was elected as a Democrat to a Nevada state district court judgeship. Fitzgerald "attained national prominency in 1896, when he espoused the silver cause and wrote a book on the money question".

In the 1897 United States Senate election, Fitzgerald received one vote in the Nevada Legislature to be appointed the United States Senator. After fourteen years as a district court judge, he was elected to the Nevada Supreme Court, carrying every county and receiving the largest vote on either ticket. In 1900, he was elected to succeed McKaskia Stearns Bonnifield as a justice of the Nevada Supreme Court. He served in this capacity for six years, declining renomination. Fitzgerald died at the home of his son Robert in Boston, Massachusetts, at the age of eighty.

Political offices
Preceded by McKaskia Stearns Bonnifield	Justice of the Supreme Court of Nevada; 1901–1907	Succeeded by James G. Sweeney
