= Judge Becker (disambiguation) =

Judge Becker may refer to:

- Cynthia J. Becker (born 1957), judge of the Georgia Superior Court on the DeKalb Superior Court
- Edward R. Becker (1933–2006), judge of the United States Court of Appeals for the Third Circuit
- Julie H. Becker (born 1974), associate judge of the Superior Court of the District of Columbia
- Lawrence Becker (1869–1947), judge of the Superior Court of Indiana
- Mary Kay Becker (born 1946), judge of the Washington Court of Appeals
- Nancy A. Becker (born 1955), judge of the Eighth Judicial District Court of Clark County, Nevada, before joining the state supreme court
- William H. Becker (1909–1992), judge of the United States District Court for the Western District of Missouri

== See also ==
- Justice Becker (disambiguation)
- Paul Becker (fl. 2000s–2020s), judge on the Canadian version of So You Think You Can Dance
