= James F. Lewis =

American judge (1836–1886)

1st Chief Justice of the Supreme Court of Nevada
- In office December 5, 1864 – January 7, 1867
- Preceded by: Position established
- Succeeded by: H. O. Beatty

Justice of the Supreme Court of Nevada
- In office December 5, 1864 – January 6, 1873
- Preceded by: Position established
- Succeeded by: Thomas Porter Hawley

Personal details
- Born: May 4, 1836 Wales, UK
- Died: August 17, 1886 (aged 50) Fort Yuma, Arizona Territory, U.S.
- Spouse: Mary Elizabeth Raymond (m. 1864–1886)
- Children: none
- Relatives: William Turnor Lewis (brother)

James F. Lewis (May 4, 1836 – August 17, 1886) was a Welsh American immigrant, lawyer, and the first Supreme Court of Nevada chief justice, serving on the court from 1864 to 1873. He was also the youngest chief justice in the history of Nevada, having been just 28 years old when he became chief justice.

== Biography ==
Born in Wales in 1836, Lewis and his parents emigrated to the United States before his 4th birthday. They resided in Utica, New York, where he was raised and educated, learning the telegraphy trade. He was hired as the manager of the Racine, Wisconsin, office of the Western Union Telegraph Company and traveled west to Racine with his younger brother, William, in 1855. He educated his brother in telegraphy, and William took over as office manager when Lewis quit to focus on the study of law.

Lewis was admitted to the bar in Wisconsin in 1861, then left Racine for Virginia City, Nevada Territory. He earned respect in his legal career in Nevada, and within three years, when Nevada was admitted to the Union as the 36th U.S. state, he was elected as one of the first justices of the Supreme Court of Nevada. The original Supreme Court was composed of three elected justices, with initial terms of 2, 4, and 6 years—to be determined by lot after the election. Lewis drew the short (2-year) term and thus became the court's first chief justice.

He was re-elected in 1866 and served a full six-year term, retiring from the court after the end of that term in January 1873.

On retiring from the court, he entered private practice in partnership with W. E. F. Deal in Virginia City. Lewis had severe Asthma for his entire life and was forced to quit Virginia City in 1881 due to trouble with that affliction.

He moved to Tombstone, Arizona Territory, where he started a new partnership with Judge H. C. Dibble and Judge George Berry. But while living at Arizona, he suffered a disastrous fire that destroyed his entire law library.

He moved to San Francisco, California in 1884 and resumed his legal career with C. K. Bonestell.

James F. Lewis died suddenly during a trip to Arizona, at Fort Yuma, in August 1886.

== Personal life and family ==
James F. Lewis was a son of William J. Lewis and his wife Jane (née Turnor). James' younger brother, William Turnor Lewis, became a prominent businessman in Racine, Wisconsin, co-founding the Mitchell-Lewis Motor Company.

James F. Lewis married Mary Elizabeth Raymond, the eldest daughter of Racine County pioneer Seneca Raymond, in November 1864. Her grandfather was Elisha Raymond, the namesake of Raymond, Wisconsin. They had no known children.

Legal offices
| Court established | Justice of the Supreme Court of Nevada; December 5, 1864 – January 6, 1873 | Succeeded by Thomas Porter Hawley |
| Court established | Chief Justice of the Supreme Court of Nevada; December 5, 1864 – January 7, 1867 | Succeeded by H. O. Beatty |
