= Erroll James Livingston Taber =

American judge (1877–1947)

Justice of the Supreme Court of Nevada
- In office 1935–1947
- Preceded by: John Adams Sanders
- Succeeded by: Milton Benjamin Badt

Personal details
- Born: November 29, 1877 Austin, Nevada, US
- Died: February 6, 1947 (aged 69) Reno, Nevada, US
- Education: Santa Clara University, Saint Paul Seminary, Columbia Law School
- Occupation: Lawyer, Judge

Erroll James Livingston Taber (November 29, 1877 – February 6, 1947) was a justice of the Supreme Court of Nevada from 1935 until his death.

Born in Austin, Nevada, he entered Santa Clara University in 1896 and in 1898 attended Saint Paul Seminary in Minnesota for two years. Thereafter he received his law degree from Columbia Law School in 1904.

He first practiced law in Elko, Nevada, and was elected district attorney for Elko County in 1909. He died in Washoe General Hospital Reno at the age of 69 from a diabetic attack.

Political offices
Preceded by John Adams Sanders	Justice of the Supreme Court of Nevada; 1935–1947	Succeeded by Milton Benjamin Badt
