= William Edwin Orr =

American judge (1881–1965)

Senior Judge of the United States Court of Appeals for the Ninth Circuit
- In office January 1, 1956 – October 7, 1965

Judge of the United States Court of Appeals for the Ninth Circuit
- In office September 28, 1945 – January 1, 1956
- Appointed by: Harry S. Truman
- Preceded by: Curtis D. Wilbur
- Succeeded by: Stanley Barnes

Personal details
- Born: William Edwin Orr; October 26, 1881 Frisco, Utah Territory
- Died: October 7, 1965 (aged 83)
- Education: University of Nevada, Reno read law

William Edwin Orr (October 26, 1881 – October 7, 1965) was a United States circuit judge of the United States Court of Appeals for the Ninth Circuit.

== Education and career ==
Born in Frisco, Utah Territory, Orr attended the University of Nevada, Reno and read law to enter the bar in 1912. He held a series of positions in Lincoln County, Nevada, first as a county clerk from 1906 to 1910, then county treasurer from 1911 to 1912, then district attorney from 1913 to 1918, and finally district judge from 1919 to 1939. He was a justice of the Nevada Supreme Court, appointed on March 2, 1939 to Benjamin Wilson Coleman's vacancy, elected November 1940 and served until 1945, including as chief justice from 1943 to 1945.

== Federal judicial service ==
On September 10, 1945, Orr was nominated by President Harry S. Truman to a seat on the United States Court of Appeals for the Ninth Circuit vacated by Judge Curtis D. Wilbur. Orr was confirmed by the United States Senate on September 19, 1945, and received his commission on September 28, 1945. He assumed senior status on January 1, 1956, serving in that capacity until his death on October 7, 1965. That same year, a middle school in Las Vegas, Nevada opened bearing his name.

== Sources ==
Political offices
Preceded by Benjamin Wilson Coleman	Justice of the Supreme Court of Nevada; 1939–1945	Succeeded by Charles Lee Horsey
Legal offices
Preceded by Curtis D. Wilbur	Judge of the United States Court of Appeals for the Ninth Circuit; 1945–1956	Succeeded by Stanley Barnes
