= Jon R. Collins =

American judge (1923–1987)

Jon Richard Collins

Justice of the Supreme Court of Nevada
- In office 1966–1971
- Preceded by: Milton Benjamin Badt
- Succeeded by: Elmer Millard Gunderson

Personal details
- Born: May 7, 1923 Ely, Nevada
- Died: March 12, 1987 (aged 63)
- Education: University of Pennsylvania (BA); Georgetown University Law Center (JD)

Jon Richard Collins (May 7, 1923 – March 12, 1987) was a justice of the Supreme Court of Nevada from 1966 to 1971.

Born in Ely, Nevada, Collins attended White Pine High School, receiving his undergraduate degree from the University of Pennsylvania, and his Juris Doctor degree from the Georgetown University Law Center.

On June 5, 1966, Governor Grant Sawyer appointed Collins to a seat on the court vacated by Milton Benjamin Badt. Collins was elected November 1966 to the four-year unexpired term.

Political offices
Preceded by Milton Benjamin Badt	Justice of the Supreme Court of Nevada; 1966–1971	Succeeded by Elmer Millard Gunderson
