= 1978 Nevada gubernatorial election =

- November 7, 1978
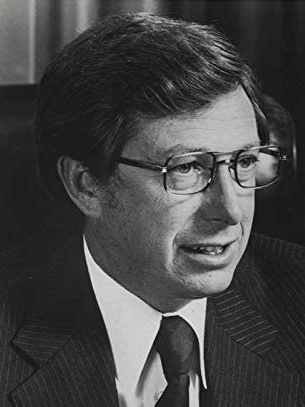

Nominee	Robert List	Robert E. Rose
Party	Republican	Democratic
Popular vote	108,097	76,361
Percentage	56.17%	39.68%
- County results List: 40–50% 50–60% 60–70% Rose: 50–60%
Governor before election
Mike O'Callaghan
Democratic
Elected Governor
Robert List
Republican

The 1978 Nevada gubernatorial election occurred on November 7, 1978. Incumbent Democratic governor Mike O'Callaghan was term limited. Republican nominee Robert List was elected Governor of Nevada, defeating Democratic nominee Robert E. Rose. Jack Lund Schofield unsuccessfully sought the Democratic nomination.

This was the only gubernatorial election Republicans won from 1970 to 1998 in the state.

== Primary elections ==
Primary elections were held on September 12, 1978.

=== Democratic primary ===
==== Candidates ====
- Dick Carter
- John Foley
- Ken Hillman
- Paul R. Holder
- Carl Hunt
- Robert E. Rose
- Jack Schofield
- Albert D. Viller

==== Results ====
Democratic primary results
Party	Candidate	Votes	%
Democratic	Robert E. Rose	41,672	48.12%
Democratic	John Foley	20,186	23.31%
Democratic	Jack Schofield	18,414	21.26%
	None of These Candidates	4,046	4.67%
Democratic	Dick Carter	602	0.70%
Democratic	Paul R. Holder	570	0.66%
Democratic	Ken Hillman	457	0.53%
Democratic	Carl Hunt	428	0.49%
Democratic	Albert D. Viller	224	0.26%
Total votes		86,599	100.00%

=== Republican primary ===
==== Candidates ====
- William C. Allen
- Fred N. Belcher
- Robert List
- Patrick T. Mylan

==== Results ====
Republican primary results
Party	Candidate	Votes	%
Republican	Robert List	39,997	82.35%
	None of These Candidates	3,570	7.35%
Republican	William C. Allen	3,038	6.26%
Republican	Patrick T. Mylan	1,360	2.80%
Republican	Fred N. Belcher	602	1.24%
Total votes		48,567	100.00%

== General Election ==
=== Candidates ===
- Robert List, Republican
- Robert E. Rose, Democratic
- Thomas F. Jefferson, Independent American
- John W. Grayson, Jr., Libertarian

Nevada gubernatorial election, 1978
Party	Candidate	Votes	%	±%
Republican	Robert List	108,097	56.17%	+39.07%
Democratic	Robert E. Rose	76,361	39.68%	−27.70%
Independent American	Thomas F. Jefferson	3,282	1.71%	−13.81%
	None of These Candidates	3,218	1.67%	+1.67%
Libertarian	John W. Grayson, Jr.	1,487	0.77%	+0.77%
Majority		31,736	16.49%	
Total votes		192,445	100.00%	
Republican gain from Democratic		Swing	66.77%	

=== County results ===
County	Robert List Republican		Robert E. Rose Democratic		Thomas F. Jefferson Independent American		None of These Candidates		John W. Grayson, Jr. Libertarian		Margin		Total votes cast
County	#	%	#	%	#	%	#	%	#	%	#	%	Total votes cast
Carson City	6,721	64.30%	3,250	31.09%	159	1.52%	257	2.46%	66	0.63%	3,471	33.21%	10,453
Churchill	2,692	60.44%	1,410	31.66%	238	5.34%	81	1.82%	33	0.74%	1,282	28.78%	4,454
Clark	51,708	53.53%	42,472	43.97%	581	0.60%	1,107	1.15%	734	0.76%	9,236	9.56%	96,602
Douglas	3,523	63.39%	1,742	31.34%	120	2.16%	127	2.28%	46	0.83%	1,781	32.04%	5,558
Elko	3,162	64.61%	1,380	28.20%	265	5.41%	57	1.16%	30	0.61%	1,782	36.41%	4,894
Esmeralda	258	53.09%	188	38.68%	28	5.76%	10	2.06%	2	0.41%	70	14.40%	486
Eureka	314	61.45%	154	30.14%	24	4.70%	6	1.17%	13	2.54%	160	31.31%	511
Humboldt	1,420	55.53%	954	37.31%	103	4.03%	71	2.78%	9	0.35%	466	18.22%	2,557
Lander	735	52.88%	567	40.79%	60	4.32%	18	1.29%	10	0.72%	168	12.09%	1,390
Lincoln	888	57.44%	579	37.45%	41	2.65%	20	1.29%	18	1.16%	309	19.99%	1,546
Lyon	2,331	54.69%	1,658	38.90%	166	3.89%	86	2.02%	21	0.49%	673	15.79%	4,262
Mineral	1,108	46.21%	1,061	44.25%	169	7.05%	53	2.21%	7	0.29%	47	1.96%	2,398
Nye	1,553	51.80%	1,300	43.36%	99	3.30%	26	0.87%	20	0.67%	253	8.44%	2,998
Pershing	630	48.54%	562	43.30%	67	5.16%	25	1.93%	14	1.08%	68	5.24%	1,298
Storey	329	40.67%	428	52.90%	26	3.21%	20	2.47%	6	0.74%	-99	-12.24%	809
Washoe	28,759	58.78%	17,570	35.91%	947	1.94%	1,204	2.46%	444	0.91%	11,189	22.87%	48,924
White Pine	1,966	59.49%	1,086	32.86%	189	5.72%	50	1.51%	14	0.42%	880	26.63%	3,305
Totals	108,097	56.17%	76,361	39.68%	3,282	1.71%	3,218	1.67%	1,487	0.77%	31,736	16.49%	192,445

==== Counties that flipped from Democratic to Republican ====
- Carson City
- Churchill
- Clark
- Douglas
- Elko
- Esmeralda
- Eureka
- Humboldt
- Lander
- Lincoln
- Lyon
- Mineral
- Nye
- Pershing
- Washoe
- White Pine
