= Benjamin Wilson Coleman =

American judge (1869–1939)

Justice of the Nevada Supreme Court
- In office 1915 – February 25, 1939
- Succeeded by: William Edwin Orr

Personal details
- Born: July 1, 1869; Ballsville, Virginia
- Died: February 25, 1939; Carson City, Nevada
- Political party: Democratic
- Education: Richmond College

Benjamin Wilson Coleman (July 1, 1869 – February 25, 1939) was a justice of the Supreme Court of Nevada from 1915 to 1939.

== Early life and education ==
Coleman was born in Ballsville, Virginia on July 1, 1869, the son of John Coleman and Arabella Smith. He received his LLB from Richmond College in 1892. He was the deputy district attorney in Cripple Creek, Colorado, before he married Martha L. Attleton and moved to Nevada in 1906. Coleman was a member of the Knights Templar.

== Career ==
He practiced law in Ely until he was elected to the ninth Judicial District in 1911. He ran for, and was elected to, the supreme court in 1914 being re-elected four times and serving four terms as chief justice.

In 1925, Coleman taught contract law at Northwestern University.

== Death ==
Coleman died in Carson City, Nevada on February 25, 1939. William Edwin Orr was appointed to fill Coleman's seat on the court.

Political offices
Preceded by George Frederick Talbot	Justice of the Supreme Court of Nevada; 1914–1939	Succeeded by William Edwin Orr
