= John Adams Sanders =

American judge (1866–1948)

Justice of the Supreme Court of Nevada
- In office 1917–1935
- Preceded by: Frank Herbert Norcross
- Succeeded by: Erroll James Livingston Taber

Personal details
- Born: October 16, 1866 Blue Ridge Mountains, Virginia
- Died: August 14, 1948 (aged 81) Reno, Nevada
- Education: University of Virginia
- Occupation: Lawyer, Judge

John Adams Sanders (October 16, 1866 – August 14, 1948) was a justice of the Supreme Court of Nevada from 1917 to 1935. He first joined as an associate justice, but was elevated to chief justice in 1921 by Governor Emmet D. Boyle.

Born in the Blue Ridge Mountains of Virginia, he attended the University of Virginia, and gained admission to the bar in Virginia in 1890. He followed a mining boom to Nevada in 1904, where he came to specialize in mining law, and settled in Tonopah, Nevada. He

Sanders was described as "one of the eminent members of the Nevada Bar", notably fighting the Industrial Workers of the World in their efforts in the state. Sanders served on the Nevada Supreme Court for eighteen years.

Sanders died at the Washoe General Hospital in Reno, "where he had been confined for several years", at the age of 81.

Political offices
Preceded by Frank Herbert Norcross	Justice of the Supreme Court of Nevada; 1917–1935	Succeeded by Erroll James Livingston Taber
