= Noel Manoukian =

American judge (1938–2019)

Noel Edwin Manoukian

Justice of the Nevada Supreme Court (Seat D)
- In office 1977–1985
- Appointed by: Mike O'Callaghan
- Preceded by: David Zenoff
- Succeeded by: C. Clifton Young

Personal details
- Born: January 1, 1938 Livingston, California
- Died: April 11, 2019 Autumn Hills Home, Gardnerville, Nevada
- Education: University of Santa Clara

Noel Edwin Manoukian (January 1, 1938 – April 11, 2019) was a justice of the Supreme Court of Nevada from 1977 to 1985.

== Early life and education ==
Manoukian was born on January 1, 1938, in Livingston, California. He attended Reno High School, where he was captain of the football team and student body president, graduating in 1956. He briefly attended Hartnell Junior College, then transferred to the University of the Pacific, which he attended on an athletic scholarship, and from which he received his Bachelor of Arts in 1961. He played college football until he was sidelined due to an injury, after which he assisted coach Tom Flores, with whom he remained friends for many years thereafter. He received a Juris Doctor from the University of Santa Clara in 1964.

== Career ==
Manoukian became a deputy district attorney in Douglas County from 1965 to 1966. He then worked in private practice in Carson City, from 1965 until 1974. In 1973, he served as legal counsel to Governor Mike O'Callaghan, who appointed Manoukian as a judge of the 1st Judicial District Court in 1974. Once seated on the court, Manoukian assumed jurisdiction over the estate case of Walter Herrmann, which had previously been presided over by Judge Richard Waters, who had died in office. Manoukian he ruled that attorneys' fees were excessive, suggesting that Waters had awarded the fees improperly and implicating misconduct by the lawyers involved.

In 1977, Manoukian was appointed by Governor O'Callaghan to the Nevada Supreme Court, and in running for reelection to the seat in 1978, Manoukian touted his actions in reversing the attorney's fees in the Herrmann case. One of the attorneys, Peter Flangas, accused Manoukian of libel. Despite being exonerated by the Judicial Commission, the controversy marred his career, with accusations that he used the case to advance his political aspirations. The Supreme Court, with Manoukian recused later reinstated the original fees, criticizing Manoukian's actions. Manoukian serving as chief justice from 1983 to 1985. He lost a bid for reelection to the court in 1984, and consequently left the court at the end of his term in 1985.

Lat in 1984, after losing his reelection bid, Manoukian sought appointment to a district court judgeship vacated by the elevation of Judge Howard D. McKibben to a federal judgeship. Manoukian withdrew after a writ was filed with the Supreme Court by the widow of Judge Waters and a lawyer connected with the Herrmann case, seeking to bar Manoukian from applying due to his role on the selection committee. Despite stating he would disqualify himself, Manoukian withdrew when the Court requested a written response.

Manoukian returned to the judiciary as a senior judge in 2003.

== Personal life ==
Manoukian married Louise Andresakis on April 8, 1969, with whom he had one daughter and one son. The son, Joseph, was sentenced to jail in 2001, where he hanged himself after five days.

Manoukian died in 2019, at the age of 81.

Political offices
| Preceded by David Zenoff | Justice of the Supreme Court of Nevada; 1977–1985 | Succeeded by C. Clifton Young |
