= H. O. Beatty =

American judge (1812–1892)

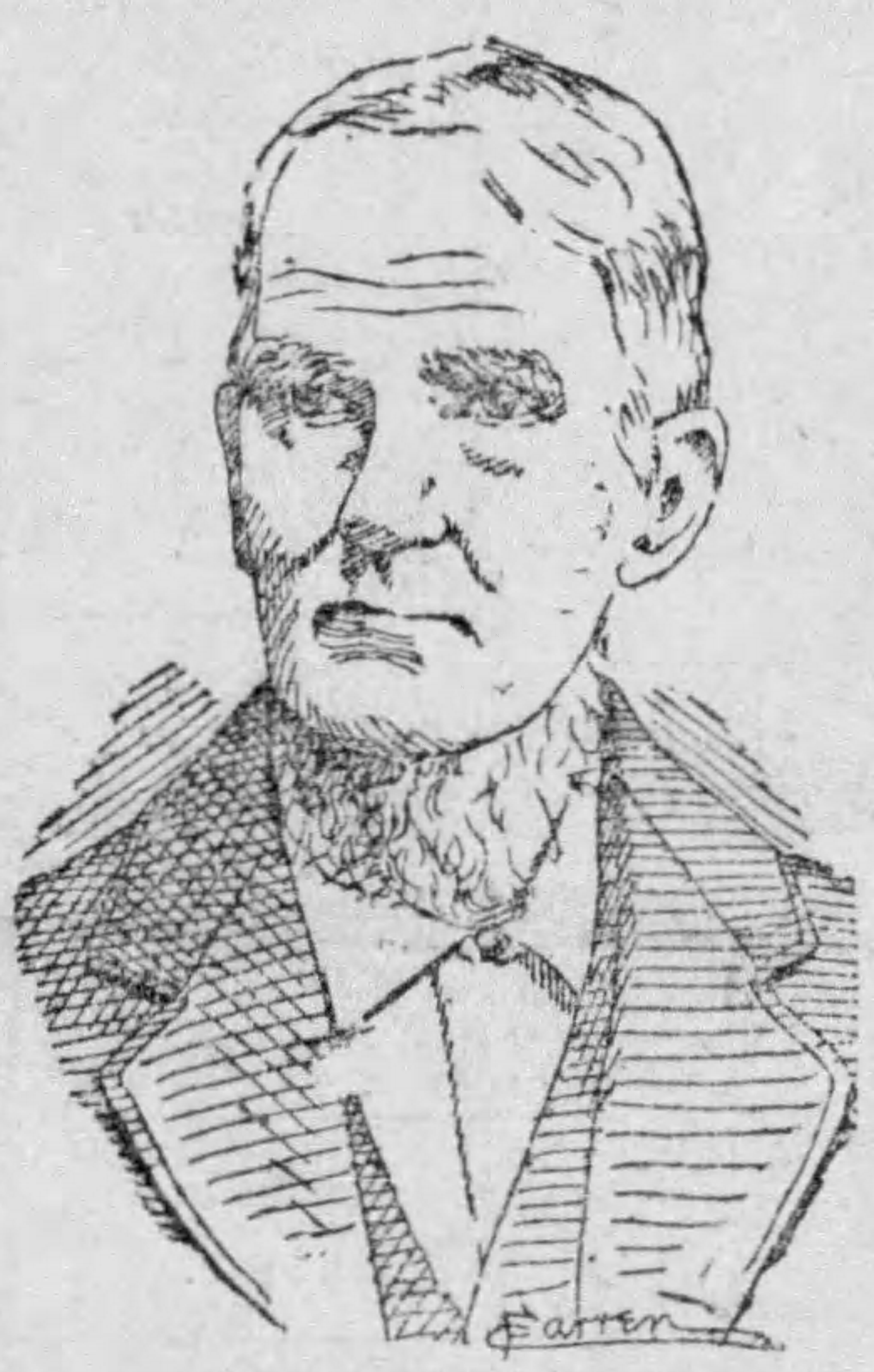

Chief Justice of the Supreme Court of Nevada
- In office January 7, 1867 – November 9, 1868
- Preceded by: James F. Lewis
- Succeeded by: James F. Lewis

Justice of the Supreme Court of Nevada
- In office December 5, 1864 – November 9, 1868
- Preceded by: newly established seat
- Succeeded by: Bernard C. Whitman

Personal details
- Born: Henry Oscar Beatty; May 31, 1812 Washington, Kentucky
- Died: February 14, 1892 (aged 79) Sacramento, California
- Party: People's Party of California (1855); Anti-Lecompton Whig (1858); Constitutional Union (1859–1860); Republican (from 1860s)
- Spouse: Margaret Boone Runyan
- Children: William H. Beatty and three daughters
- Parents: Adam Beatty (father); Sally Green (mother)

Henry Oscar Beatty (May 31, 1812 – February 14, 1892) was an American lawyer and jurist who served as a justice of the Supreme Court of Nevada from 1864 to 1868, and who was a leading societal figure in Sacramento, California.

== Early career and candidacies ==
Beatty was born in Washington, Kentucky, the son of Adam Beatty (1777–1858), a Kentucky circuit court judge and state senator, and Sally Green Beatty. He moved to Ohio, where he was admitted to the bar in 1836. He subsequently practiced law in Kentucky until moving to Sacramento, California in February 1852, where he became a frequent candidate for local office. He was a candidate for the California Supreme Court in 1855 on the ticket of a temperance party calling itself the People's Party of California. In 1858, he lost the nomination of the Anti-Lecompton Whig Party for the California Supreme Court. He was a Constitutional Union Party candidate for the California State Assembly in 1860, but withdrew prior to the election. He sought the Republican Party nomination for Sacramento County district attorney in 1861, but came in second place at the Republican County Convention. In 1862, he was one of three Union Party nominees for the position of City Levee Commissioner in Sacramento. He was elected, and resigned on June 13, 1863. He sought the Union Party nomination for the Supreme Court of California in 1863.

== Career in Nevada ==
Beatty moved to Virginia City, Nevada, in 1863, and was a Union Party candidate for District Judge of Storey County in 1864. Later that year, he won a seat on the Supreme Court of Nevada on the Union/Republican Party ticket in the first election after Nevada statehood. He served in this position from December 5, 1864, until his resignation on November 9, 1868. In the same election, his son, William H. Beatty (a future justice of the Nevada and California Supreme Courts), was elected as the District Judge for Lander County. Beatty was elevated to chief justice on January 8, 1867.

== Return to California ==
After his resignation, Beatty returned to Sacramento where he again practiced law. He was a county judge from approximately 1869 until 1875. He was a bond and debt commissioner in Sacramento from 1872 until 1886, and again from 1888 until his death, designing and leading an effort to pay off the city's debts and preventing its insolvency. He was appointed as receiver of public moneys for Sacramento in 1879 by President Rutherford B. Hayes He also directed the city's smelting works from 1874 to 1876, and was an innovator of waterworks for mining, receiving a patent for a steam motor in 1889. He practiced law until the early 1880s, when his hearing failed. He died in Sacramento on February 14, 1892.

== Electoral history ==
Election for the Nevada Supreme Court, November 8, 1864
| Party | Candidate | Votes | % |
|---|---|---|---|
| Republican | Cornelius M. Brosnan | 9,838 | 20.1 |
| Republican | H. O. Beatty | 9,826 | 20.1 |
| Republican | James F. Lewis | 9,804 | 20.0 |
| Democratic | E. W. McKinstry | 6,540 | 13.3 |
| Democratic | W. C. Wallace | 6,520 | 13.3 |
| Democratic | J. R. McConnell | 6,476 | 13.2 |
| Total votes | | 49,004 | 100 |

Political offices
| Preceded by newly established seat | Justice of the Supreme Court of Nevada; 1864–1868 | Succeeded by Bernard C. Whitman |
