= Howellville, Pennsylvania =

Unincorporated community in Pennsylvania, US

- Location of Howellville in Pennsylvania Howellville (the United States)
- Coordinates: 40°03′34″N 75°28′11″W
- Country: United States
- State: Pennsylvania
- County: Chester
- Township: Tredyffrin
- Elevation: 200 ft (61 m)
- Time zone: UTC-5 (Eastern (EST))
  - Summer (DST): UTC-4 (EDT)
- ZIP codes: 19312
- Area code: 610
- FIPS code: 42-35472
- GNIS feature ID: 1203850

Howellville is a populated place situated in Tredyffrin Township in Chester County, Pennsylvania, United States. It has an estimated elevation of 200 feet (61 m) above sea level.
