= Nancy Saitta =

American lawyer and judge

Associate Justice of the Nevada Supreme Court
- In office January 1, 2007 – August 12, 2016
- Preceded by: Nancy A. Becker
- Succeeded by: Lidia S. Stiglich

Personal details
- Born: Detroit, Michigan, U.S.
- Education: Wayne State University (BS, JD)

Nancy M. Saitta is an American attorney and jurist who served as an associate justice of the Supreme Court of Nevada from 2007 to 2016.

== Early life and education ==
Saitta was born in Detroit. She earned a Bachelor of Science degree from Wayne State University and a Juris Doctor from the Wayne State University Law School.

== Career ==
She began her judicial career in 1996, when she was appointed to a seat on Las Vegas Municipal Court. Two years later, she was elected to the District Court bench. As district judge, she created the Complex Litigation Division.

She was first elected to the Nevada Supreme Court in 2006 and was reelected in 2012. After serving 10 years on the Nevada Supreme Court, Saitta announced her retirement in an official letter to then-Governor Brian Sandoval, effective August 8, 2016. Justice Saitta regularly says that she had no greater honor as she served the people of Nevada.
