= Elmer Millard Gunderson =

American judge

Justice of the Supreme Court of Nevada
- In office 1971–1989
- Preceded by: Jon R. Collins
- Succeeded by: Robert E. Rose

Personal details
- Born: August 9, 1929 Minneapolis, Minnesota
- Died: May 13, 2010 (aged 80)
- Education: Creighton University School of Law
- Occupation: Lawyer, Judge

Elmer Millard Gunderson (August 9, 1929 – May 13, 2010) was a justice of the Supreme Court of Nevada from 1971 to 1989.

Born in Minneapolis, Minnesota, Gunderson served in the United States Army during the Korean War, and received his law degree from Creighton University. He was a blackjack dealer in Las Vegas in his twenties.

In 1970, Gunderson ran for a seat on the Nevada Supreme Court. A 1970 editorial recommended his opponent, Harold O. Taber, noting that Gunderson had only been in practice for 12 years at that point, compared to Taber's 34 years, and that Gunderson was only ranked "fair" by fellow lawyers in the Martindale-Hubbell directory. However, Taber ran a poor campaign, while Gunderson "campaigned for months statewide and used the media heavily", resulting in Gunderson's victory.

He was elected to three terms on the Nevada Supreme Court, after which he taught law for two years at Southwestern Law School, from 1989 to 1991. After his retirement from the court in 1989, Gunderson was accused of running up state-paid phone bills with calls to casinos, construction companies, and state officials, but defended the charge with the claim that he was continuing to carry out state business from home following a heart attack.

Gunderson died in 2010, aged 80.

Political offices
Preceded by Jon R. Collins	Justice of the Supreme Court of Nevada; 1971–1989	Succeeded by Robert E. Rose
