= Cameron Batjer =

American judge

Cameron McVicar Batjer

Justice of the Nevada Supreme Court (Seat B)
- In office October 1, 1967 – November 4, 1981
- Preceded by: seat established
- Succeeded by: Thomas L. Steffen

District Attorney of Ormsby County
- In office 1955–1959
- Preceded by: Paul Laxalt
- Succeeded by: John Tom Ross

Personal details
- Born: August 24, 1919 Smith Valley, Nevada, US
- Died: June 1, 2011 (aged 91) Carson City, Nevada, US
- Spouse(s): Lura Gamble Batjer (m. May 16, 1942–December 9, 1997; her death)
- Children: 3
- Education: University of Nevada, Reno; University of Utah College of Law

Cameron McVicar Batjer (August 24, 1919 – June 1, 2011) was an American lawyer and Justice on the Supreme Court of Nevada from 1967 to 1981.

== Early life ==
Batjer was born on his maternal grandparents' ranch in Smith Valley, Nevada to Robert Wilhelm Batjer and Mary Belle McVicar. His father, a native of Oldenburg, Germany, was a cattle rancher and teamster, and his mother was a schoolteacher. He attended Fernley School and graduated from the University of Nevada in 1941, majoring in economics and history. While at the University of Nevada, he was a member of Lambda Chi Alpha fraternity.

He taught school in Dayton, Nevada. After the attack on Pearl Harbor, Batjer enlisted in the United States Navy, serving in the Seabees with the 3rd Marine Division in the Pacific Theater. While at Guadalcanal, he received a commission and was assigned to General Douglas MacArthur's staff in Brisbane, Australia. Upon returning home, he resumed his teaching career, first in McGill, Nevada, and then as football and basketball coach at Fernley High School.

Batjer graduated from University of Utah College of Law, Order of the Coif, in 1950. He was admitted to the bar in 1950.

== Career ==
Batjer chief counsel of the Utah State Senate and, in 1951, was hired as chief counsel to the staff of U.S. Senator George W. Malone in Washington D.C. Returning to Nevada, he taught school and practiced law in Carson City before becoming district attorney of Ormsby County, succeeding Paul Laxalt, in 1954. He served as chairman of the Ormsby County Republican Party and twice ran for Nevada Attorney General, albeit unsuccessfully.

When the Supreme Court of Nevada was expanded from three to five members in 1967, Governor Paul Laxalt appointed Batjer to fill one of the two new seats and was subsequently elected three times in statewide elections. He resigned from the court in 1981 to accept an appointment as chairman of the United States Parole Commission from President Ronald Reagan, a position he would serve in until his retirement in 1990.

Batjer received the United States Parole Commission Ben Baer Award for Outstanding Leadership and the Washoe County Bar Association Lifetime Achievement Award.

== Personal life ==
While teaching school in Dayton, Betjer met and married fellow teacher Lura Gamble, a native of Hazen, Nevada.

He received the University of Nevada Alumni Association Alumnus of the Year Award and the Phil Harris Award for Outstanding Service from Rotary International. He died on June 1, 2011, in Carson City.
