= John C. Wagner =

American politician

John C. Wagner (March 27, 1858 – October 11, 1937) was an American businessman and politician.

Wagner was born in Racine, Wisconsin and went to the Racine public schools. He worked in the weaving industry and then entered the hotel business in Racine. He also operated catering and restaurant businesses. Wagner served on the Racine Common Council and the Racine Board of Supervisors. He also served as sheriff of Racine County and was a Republican. Wagner served in the Wisconsin Assembly in 1899 and 1900. Wagner died in Racine, Wisconsin after a long illness.
