= David Zenoff =

American judge

Justice of the Nevada Supreme Court (Seat D)
- In office April 26, 1965 – 1977
- Appointed by: Grant Sawyer
- Preceded by: Frank McNamee
- Succeeded by: Noel Manoukian

Personal details
- Born: March 8, 1916 Amherst, Wisconsin, US
- Died: October 3, 2005 (aged 89) Encinitas, California, US

David Zenoff (March 8, 1916 – October 3, 2005) was an American judge from Nevada.

Born in Amherst, Wisconsin, Zenoff received his law degree from the University of Wisconsin. He served as a major in the United States Marine Corps during World War II, earning a Bronze Star. He moved to Las Vegas, Nevada, and was admitted to the Nevada bar in 1948. He served as a justice of the Nevada Supreme Court from 1965 until 1977.

On May 1, 1967, Judge Zenoff presided over the wedding of Elvis and Priscilla Presley. He also presided over the divorce between Eddie Fisher and Debbie Reynolds.

Judge Zenoff helped found the juvenile justice system in Clark County, Nevada and the county juvenile detention center (David Zenoff Hall) is named after him.

His spouse was Beverly Banks. They had three children.

He retired to La Costa in Carlsbad, California, and died in the Scripps Hospital in Encinitas.
