= Myron E. Leavitt =

American judge

27th Lieutenant Governor of Nevada
- In office January 1, 1979 – January 3, 1983
- Governor: Robert List
- Preceded by: Robert E. Rose
- Succeeded by: Bob Cashell

District Court Judge, No. 8, Dept. 1
- In office 1984 – January 4, 1998
- Preceded by: Robert G. Legakes
- Succeeded by: Bob Cashell

Justice of the Nevada Supreme Court, Seat F
- In office January 5, 1999 – January 9, 2004
- Preceded by: New Seat
- Succeeded by: Michael L. Douglas

Personal details
- Born: October 27, 1930; Las Vegas, Nevada, U.S.
- Died: January 9, 2004 (aged 73); Las Vegas, Nevada, U.S.
- Resting place: Palm Memorial Park Northwest, Las Vegas
- Political party: Democratic

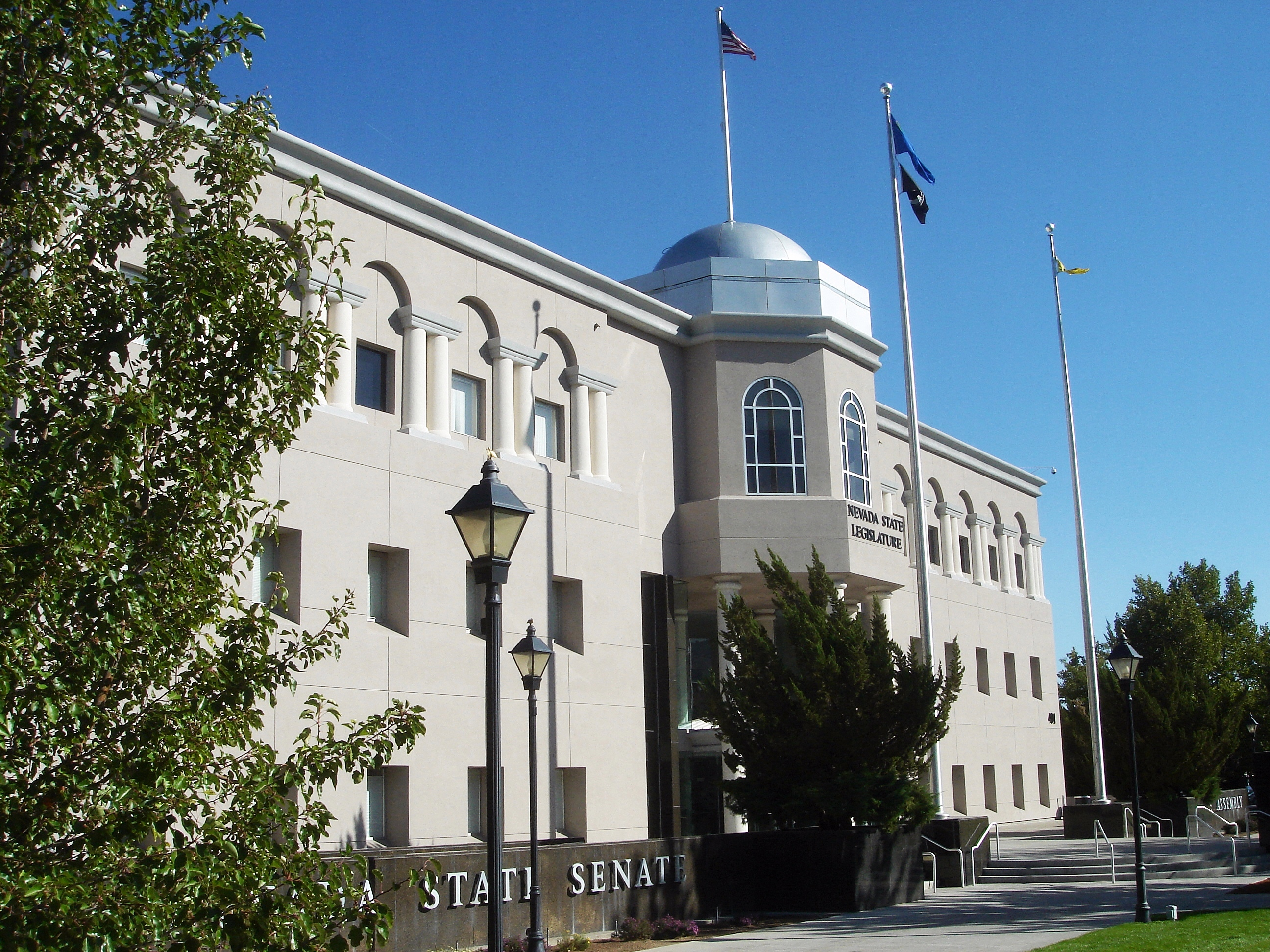
Nevada Legislature: Forced to reapportion based on population due to arguments by attorney Myron Leavitt

Myron E. Leavitt (October 27, 1930 – January 9, 2004) was an American politician who was the 27th lieutenant governor of Nevada from 1979 to 1983. He was a native of Las Vegas, Nevada, and served in many political positions, including the Clark County Commission from 1971 to 1974, and the Las Vegas City Council from 1975 to 1978. He was a member of the Democratic Party.

Leavitt was born in 1930 in Las Vegas to Myron 'Mike' Leavitt, a county highway department worker, and his wife Estella, a maid. Following graduation from Las Vegas High School in 1948, Myron E. Leavitt won an athletics scholarship to the University of Nevada, Reno.

Graduating from UNR with a degree in journalism, Leavitt returned to Vegas, where he worked as sports editor for the Las Vegas Review-Journal. With the encouragement of his brother, Leavitt entered the University of Utah College of Law, where he graduated in 1956, eighth in his class. He returned to Las Vegas, where he entered private practice.

Leavitt subsequently served as Justice of the Peace, Clark County Commissioner (as had his father), Las Vegas City Commissioner, and ultimately as the state's Lieutenant Governor.

Following his term as Lt Governor, then-Governor Richard Bryan appointed Myron to the District Court in 1984, where Leavitt served until being elected to the Nevada Supreme Court in 1998, a position to which he was reelected in 2000, and was holding at the time of his death in 2004.

Leavitt had earlier run for the State Supreme Court twice (1988 and 1994) but failed to get elected. He ran unsuccessfully for governor in 1982.

As an attorney in private practice for 28 years, Leavitt successfully argued a case that ultimately forced the Nevada Legislature to reapportion itself according to population. He also argued the case that forced the Board of Regents at the University of Nevada to reapportion itself.

The Justice Myron E. Leavitt Middle School in Las Vegas was named in honor of the Supreme Court Justice in March, 2002.

Political offices
Preceded by Robert E. Rose	Lieutenant Governor of Nevada; January 1, 1979 – January 3, 1983	Succeeded by Bob Cashell
