= John Code Mowbray =

American judge (1918–1997)

Justice of the Nevada Supreme Court (Seat A)
- In office October 1, 1967 – January 4, 1993
- Preceded by: Position Created
- Succeeded by: Miriam C. Shearing

Personal details
- Born: September 20, 1918 Bradford, Illinois, U.S.
- Died: March 5, 1997 (aged 78) Las Vegas, Nevada, U.S.
- Education: Western Illinois University; University of Notre Dame

Military service
- Allegiance: United States
- Branch/service: United States Army
- Years of service: 1942–1946
- Rank: Major
- Unit: United States Army Air Corps
- Battles/wars: World War II

John Code Mowbray (September 20, 1918 – March 5, 1997) was a Nevada attorney and judge who served as a justice of the Supreme Court of Nevada from 1967 to 1993.

== Early life, education, and military service ==
Born in Bradford, Illinois, to Thomas J. and Ellen Driscoll (Code) Mowbray, Mowbray received a degree in education from Western Illinois University in 1940, and was a high school teacher from then until 1942, when he enlisted in the United States Army to fight in World War II. He served as an aircraft pilot in the United States Army Air Corps, remaining in the service until 1946, and attaining the rank of major.

After the war, Mowbray received his law degree from the Notre Dame Law School in 1949, where he served as president of the student body, and on the advice of Senator Pat McCarran, moved to Las Vegas, Nevada, to enter the practice of law that year. He worked as deputy in the office of the district attorney for Clark County, Nevada, until 1953, when he entered private practice.

== Judicial service ==
From 1955 to 1959, Mowbray served as a Referee in Bankruptcy, and in 1959, Governor Grant Sawyer named Mowbray to a seat on the Nevada Eighth Judicial District Court, where Mowbray served for twelve years, from 1959 to 1967. During this time, Mowbray addressed a substantial backlog in cases and championed legislation to protect abused children and provide public defenders for indigent defendants.

On August 11, 1967, Governor Paul Laxalt appointed Mowbray to a newly established seat on the state supreme court. Mowbray was subsequently reelected four times, and served for several periods as Chief Justice of the court. Towards the end of his career on the state supreme court, Mowbray was troubled by glaucoma slowly causing blindness, and bitterly disputed criticisms from other members of the court asserting a decline in his work. Mowbray retired from the bench in January 1993, after twenty-five years on the high court.

== Death ==
Mowbray died in a Las Vegas hospital, where he was being treated for kidney problems, at the age of 78.
