= Mark Gibbons =

American judge

Chief Justice of the Nevada Supreme Court
- In office January 7, 2019 – January 6, 2020
- Preceded by: Michael L. Douglas
- Succeeded by: Kristina Pickering
- In office January 6, 2014 – January 5, 2015
- Preceded by: Kristina Pickering
- Succeeded by: James Hardesty
- In office January 7, 2008 – January 2, 2009
- Preceded by: A. William Maupin
- Succeeded by: James Hardesty

Justice of the Nevada Supreme Court Seat D
- In office 2002 – January 4, 2021
- Preceded by: Cliff Young
- Succeeded by: Douglas W. Herndon

Personal details
- Born: December 12, 1950 (age 75) Whittier, California, U.S.
- Education: Rio Hondo College; University of California, Irvine (BA); Loyola Marymount University (JD)

Mark Gibbons (born December 12, 1950) is a former justice of the Supreme Court of Nevada. He was elected to the Nevada Supreme Court in 2002. Gibbons attended the University of California, Irvine and earned his bachelor's degree in 1972. He attended law school at Loyola University School of Law in Los Angeles and graduated in 1975. He served as chief justice of the Supreme Court of Nevada in 2008, 2014 and 2019. Before being elected to the Nevada Supreme Court he served on the Clark County District Court as presiding judge in 1998 and Chief Judge in 2001.

Gibbons earned a Bachelor of Arts degree from the University of California, Irvine, and received his Juris Doctor from Loyola Law School.

Gibbons is the brother of judge Michael P. Gibbons, currently serving on the Nevada Court of Appeals. The Commission on Judicial Ethics ruled that Justice Gibbons could preside over appeals heard by his brother.

Legal offices
Preceded by Cliff Young	Justice of the Nevada Supreme Court; Seat D 2002–2021	Succeeded by Douglas W. Herndon
Preceded by A. William Maupin	Chief Justice of the Nevada Supreme Court; 2008–2009	Succeeded by James Hardesty
Preceded by Kristina Pickering	Chief Justice of the Nevada Supreme Court; 2014–2015	Succeeded by James Hardesty
Preceded by Michael L. Douglas	Chief Justice of the Nevada Supreme Court; 2019–2020	Succeeded by Kristina Pickering
