= Miriam Shearing =

American judge

Chief Justice of the Supreme Court of Nevada
- In office 1997

Justice of the Supreme Court of Nevada (Seat A)
- In office January 1993 – January 2005
- Preceded by: John C. Mowbray
- Succeeded by: James Hardesty

Chief Judge of the Eighth Judicial District Court of Nevada
- In office 1986

Judge of the Eighth Judicial District Court of Nevada
- In office January 1983 – January 1993

Personal details
- Born: Ellen Miriam Mattinen; February 24, 1935 (age 90); Waverly, New York, U.S.
- Spouse: Steven P. Shearing (m. 1954–d. 2011)
- Children: 3
- Education: Cornell University (BA); Boston College (JD)

Miriam Mattinen Shearing (born Ellen Miriam Mattinen; February 24, 1935) is an American lawyer and retired judge in Nevada. Shearing was the first woman to serve as a Nevada district judge and as justice and chief justice on the Supreme Court of Nevada (1993–2005).

== Early life and education ==
She was born on February 24, 1935, in Waverly, New York. Shearing grew up on a farm near Spencer, New York, the oldest of three children. She was the daughter of Eino Olavi and Lillian Sophia (Petaja) Mattinen.

Her parents were Finnish American, and she spoke Finnish in the home. Shearing graduated from Cornell University with a Bachelor of Arts in philosophy; at Cornell, she met her husband, Steven Shearing. She then graduated from Boston College Law School, where she took night classes while her husband attended medical school.

== Career ==
After graduation, the Shearings moved to California, where Steven Shearing completed his medical internship and residency, and then lived in Pakistan, where Steven Shearing worked for CARE. The Shearings moved to Nevada in 1969, and Shearing was admitted to the bar in Nevada that year, becoming the fiftieth woman admitted to practice in the state. Shearing practiced for several years in Las Vegas, and became a juvenile court referee in 1975. Shearing successfully ran for a seat on the justice court, after the Clark County Commission (which was opposed to a woman serving on the court) refused to appoint her to an open seat.

In 1977, Shearing became a justice of the peace in Clark County. In 1983, Shearing became a Nevada District Court judge, the first woman to do so In 1986, Shearing became chief judge on the court and served as president of the Nevada District Judges Association.

In 1992, Shearing won an election to the Nevada Supreme Court, defeating District Judge J. Charles Thompson, the one-time favorite, 43 percent to 29 percent. Shearing was an advocate of abortion rights who during the election campaign urged "a female voice" on the court. The election was deeply bitter in tone, which the Nevada Commission on Judicial Discipline criticized, prompting Shearing and Thompson to apologize and agree "to refrain from negative campaigning in the future." Shearing became the first woman on the Nevada Supreme Court, and the 40th serving female state supreme court justice.

Shearing served on the court for twelve years, and was named chief justice in 1997. She ran unopposed for reelection in 1998. Shearing announced in April 2003 that she would not seek a third term, and retired on January 4, 2005, at the conclusion of her second term in office.

Shearing said that upon retirement she would divide her time between Las Vegas and Incline Village.

== Personal life ==
Shearing was married to husband Dr. Steven Shearing (d. 2011), an ophthalmologist and pioneer in cataract surgery. They had three children.

In February 1984, the Shearings were part of a group of landowners who donated 1,470 acres of land near Pioche, Nevada, to the University of Nevada, Las Vegas. Valued at $882,000, the donation was at that time one of the largest gifts in UNLV history.

== See also ==
- List of female state supreme court justices
- List of first women lawyers and judges in Nevada
