= Kristina Pickering =

American judge (born 1952)

Kris Pickering

Chief Justice of the Nevada Supreme Court
- In office January 6, 2020 – January 4, 2021
- Preceded by: Mark Gibbons
- Succeeded by: James Hardesty
- In office January 5, 2013 – December 31, 2013
- Preceded by: Michael Cherry
- Succeeded by: Mark Gibbons

Justice of the Nevada Supreme Court
- Incumbent
- Assumed office January 5, 2009
- Preceded by: A. William Maupin

Personal details
- Born: Mary Kristina Pickering; October 7, 1952 (age 73) San Francisco, California, U.S.
- Party: Republican
- Education: Yale University (BA); University of California, Davis (JD)

Mary Kristina Pickering (born October 7, 1952, in San Francisco, California) is a justice of the Nevada Supreme Court. She became the fifth woman to serve on the Court when she was sworn in on January 5, 2009. She received a Bachelor of Arts at Yale University, and her Juris Doctor from the University of California, Davis School of Law. She became Chief Justice on January 6, 2020. She previously served as chief justice in 2013.

Legal offices
| Preceded by A. William Maupin | Justice of the Nevada Supreme Court; 2009–present | Incumbent |
| Preceded by Michael Cherry | Chief Justice of the Nevada Supreme Court; 2013 | Succeeded by Mark Gibbons |
| Preceded by Mark Gibbons | Chief Justice of the Nevada Supreme Court; 2020–2021 | Succeeded by James Hardesty |
