= Charles Merton Merrill =

American judge (1907–1996)

Senior Judge of the United States Court of Appeals for the Ninth Circuit
- In office October 8, 1974 – March 29, 1996

Judge of the United States Court of Appeals for the Ninth Circuit
- In office September 21, 1959 – October 8, 1974
- Appointed by: Dwight D. Eisenhower
- Preceded by: William Healy
- Succeeded by: Anthony Kennedy

Personal details
- Born: Charles Merton Merrill; December 11, 1907 Honolulu, Territory of Hawaii
- Died: March 29, 1996 (aged 88) San Francisco, California, U.S.
- Education: University of California, Berkeley (BA); Harvard University (LLB)

Charles Merton Merrill (December 11, 1907 – March 29, 1996) was a United States circuit judge of the United States Court of Appeals for the Ninth Circuit.

== Education and career ==
Born in Honolulu, Territory of Hawaii, Merrill received a B.A. degree from the University of California, Berkeley in 1928 and a Bachelor of Laws from Harvard Law School in 1931. He was in private practice in Reno, Nevada from 1931 to 1950. He became a justice of the Nevada Supreme Court from 1951 to 1959, serving as chief justice from 1955 to 1956, and in 1959.

== Federal judicial service ==
On August 27, 1959, Merrill was nominated by President Dwight D. Eisenhower to a seat on the United States Court of Appeals for the Ninth Circuit vacated by Judge William Healy. Merrill was confirmed by the United States Senate on September 14, 1959, and received his commission on September 21, 1959. He assumed senior status on October 8, 1974, serving in that capacity until his death on March 29, 1996, in San Francisco, California.

== Sources ==
Legal offices
Preceded by William Healy	Judge of the United States Court of Appeals for the Ninth Circuit; 1959–1974	Succeeded by Anthony Kennedy
