= Douglas W. Herndon =

American judge (born 1964)

Douglas Herndon

Chief Justice of the Nevada Supreme Court
- Incumbent
- Assumed office January 6, 2025
- Preceded by: Elissa F. Cadish

Justice of the Nevada Supreme Court
- Incumbent
- Assumed office January 4, 2021
- Preceded by: Mark Gibbons

Personal details
- Born: 1964 (age 61–62)
- Party: Republican
- Education: Texas A&M University (BS); Washington and Lee University (JD)

Douglas Wade Herndon (born 1964) is an American lawyer who has served as the chief justice of the Nevada Supreme Court since 2025 and as an associate justice since 2021.

== Education ==
Herndon earned his Bachelor of Science from Texas A&M University in 1986 and his Juris Doctor from the Washington and Lee University School of Law in 1990.

== Career ==
From 1990 to 1991, he served as an appellate law clerk in the district attorney's office and then from 1991 to 1996 he served as deputy district attorney. From 1996 to 2005 he served as chief deputy district attorney in the Special Victims Unit.

Prosecutorial Misconduct

As a prosecutor, Herndon infamously concealed evidence from the defense in the case of Fred Steese, who was accused of murdering trapeze artist Gerard Soules. Herndon had evidence in his files that strongly suggested that Steese was in Idaho at the time of Soule's murder, which took place in Las Vegas. Fred Steese needlessly spent over 20 years in prison for another person's crime, though he maintained his innocence and filed appeals to his conviction.

Steese would eventually be released on an Alfred plea, and later have his conviction completely overturned. Later, he sued in state court and was awarded close to $1.4 million.

Doug Herndon eventually testified before the Nevada State Legislature in a statement that seemed to imply he indeed hid exculpatory evidence in Herndon's case.

In 2005 he was appointed to be a judge by Governor Kenny Guinn. From 2005 to 2009 he served as a District Court Judge of the Eighth Judicial District Court; from 2009 to 2017 he served as Chief Judge of the Criminal Division within the same court.

From 2017 to 2021, Herndon was chief presiding criminal judge of the Eighth Judicial District Court in Las Vegas.

=== Nevada Supreme Court ===
On November 20, 2019, Herndon announced his candidacy for the Nevada Supreme Court for 2020. On November 3, 2020, he was elected to be a justice of the Nevada Supreme Court, defeating his Democratic opponent Nevada Assemblyman Ozzie Fumo. He was sworn into office on January 4, 2021.

Legal offices
Preceded by Mark Gibbons	Justice of the Nevada Supreme Court; Seat D 2021–present	Incumbent
Preceded by Elissa F. Cadish	Chief Justice of the Nevada Supreme Court; 2025–present	Incumbent
