= A. William Maupin =

American judge

Justice of the Nevada Supreme Court (Seat B)
- In office January 06, 1997 – January 06, 2009
- Preceded by: Thomas L. Steffen
- Succeeded by: Kristina Pickering

Personal details
- Education: University of Nevada, Reno (BA); University of Arizona (JD)

A. William Maupin was a justice of the Supreme Court of Nevada from 1997 to 2009.

== Education ==
Maupin received his bachelor's degree from the University of Nevada, Reno in 1968 and his Juris Doctor from the University of Arizona College of Law in 1971.

== Career ==
After law school, Maupin worked in private practice until 1993 when Governor Bob Miller appointed him a judge for the Eighth Judicial District Court in Carson City. In 1996, he was elected to the Supreme Court.

In 2002, Maupin was re-elected to the Court, defeating former district judge Don Chairez 58.39% to 32.31%.

After retiring from the court in 2009, he joined the law firm of Lionel Sawyer & Collins.

Political offices
Preceded by Thomas L. Steffen	Justice of the Nevada Supreme Court; 1997–2009	Succeeded by Kristina Pickering
