= Nancy A. Becker =

American judge (born 1955)

Nancy Becker

Justice of the Nevada Supreme Court (Seat G)
- In office January 4, 1999 – January 1, 2007
- Preceded by: Position Established
- Succeeded by: Nancy Saitta

Personal details
- Born: May 23, 1955 (age 70)
- Education: United States International University (BA); George Washington University (JD)

Nancy Anne Becker (born May 23, 1955) is an American attorney who served as a justice of the Supreme Court of Nevada from 1999 to 2006, including service as chief justice in 2005.

== Education ==
Becker received a Bachelor of Arts from United States International University in 1976, and Juris Doctor from the George Washington University Law School in 1979.

== Legal career ==
She was in private practice in the District of Columbia and Maryland from 1979 to 1983, and then joined the Las Vegas City Attorney's Office as a prosecutor until 1987, when she became a Las Vegas Municipal Judge. From 1989 to 1998, she was a District Court Judge in the Eighth Judicial District Court of Clark County, Nevada.

In 1999, Becker was appointed to a newly created seat on the Nevada Supreme Court, by Governor Kenny Guinn. Following Becker's participation as a concurring vote in Guinn v. Nevada State Legislature, a 2003 decision interpreting the Constitution of Nevada as requiring the legislature to appropriate funds for education, Becker was the subject of negative advertisements painting her as responsible for a higher tax burden on Nevada citizens. The only participating justice up for reelection in the ensuing election cycle, she was defeated by challenger Nancy Saitta, "an arguably much less qualified opponent".

After serving on the Nevada Supreme Court, Becker became a deputy district attorney in Las Vegas. As of 2017, she began serving on the Eighth Judicial District Court.

Political offices
Preceded by Newly created seat.	Justice of the Supreme Court of Nevada; 1999–2006	Succeeded by Nancy Saitta
