= Charles M. Hambright =

American businessman and politician

Charles M. Hambright (July 7, 1845 – October 5, 1938) was an American businessman and politician.

Born in the town of Rochester, Racine County, Wisconsin Territory, Hambright lived in Dodge County, Wisconsin from 1849 to 1867 and then for three years in the 1870s. During that time, Hambright served in the Union Army during the American Civil War. In 1876 and 1877, Hambright served on the Beaver Dam, Wisconsin common council. Hambright worked for Racine Woolen Mills. In 1895, Hambright served in the Wisconsin State Assembly from Racine, Wisconsin and was a Republican. Hambright died at the soldiers home in Milwaukee, Wisconsin.
