= 2018 Nevada elections =

- November 6, 2018
- Registered: 1,564,066
- Turnout: 62.4% (▼14.3 pp)

Elections were held in Nevada on November 6, 2018. On that date, the state held elections for Governor, Lieutenant Governor, Attorney General, Secretary of State, Treasurer, Controller, U.S. Senate, U.S. House of Representatives, Nevada Senate, Nevada Assembly, and various others. In addition, several measures were on the ballot.

== United States Senate ==
Incumbent Republican U.S. Senator Dean Heller ran for re-election to a second full term but lost to Democratic U.S. Representative Jacky Rosen.

United States Senate election in Nevada, 2018
Party	Candidate	Votes	%
Democratic	Jacky Rosen	490,071	50.4
Republican	Dean Heller (incumbent)	441,202	45.4
None of These Candidates		15,303	1.6
Independent	Barry Michaels	9,269	1.0
Libertarian	Tim Hagan	9,196	0.9
Independent American	Kamau Bakari	7,091	0.7
Total votes		972,132	100.0
Democratic gain from Republican			

== United States House of Representatives ==
All of Nevada's four seats in the United States House of Representatives were up for election in 2018.

== Governor ==
Incumbent Republican governor Brian Sandoval was term-limited for life and could not run for re-election to a third term in office.

Nevada gubernatorial election, 2018
Party	Candidate	Votes	%
Democratic	Steve Sisolak	480,007	49.4
Republican	Adam Laxalt	440,320	45.3
None of These Candidates		18,865	1.9
Independent	Ryan Bundy	13,891	1.4
Independent American	Russell Best	10,076	1.0
Libertarian	Jared Lord	8,640	0.9
Total votes		971,799	100.0
Democratic gain from Republican			

== Lieutenant governor ==
Incumbent Republican lieutenant governor Mark Hutchison did not run for re-election to a second term.

2018 Nevada lieutenant gubernatorial election
Party	Candidate	Votes	%	±%
Democratic	Kate Marshall	486,381	50.35	+16.70
Republican	Michael Roberson	421,697	43.66	–15.81
Independent American	Janine Hansen	23,893	2.47	–1.42
None of These Candidates		23,537	2.44	–0.55
Independent	Ed Uehling	10,435	1.08	N/a
Total votes		965,943	100.00	
Democratic gain from Republican		Swing	+16.26	

== Attorney general ==
Incumbent Republican attorney general Adam Laxalt did not run for re-election to a second term and instead ran unsuccessfully for governor.

2018 Nevada Attorney General election
Party	Candidate	Votes	%	±%
Democratic	Aaron Ford	456,225	47.24	+1.92
Republican	Wesley Duncan	451,692	46.77	+0.55
Independent American	Joel Hansen	32,259	3.34	–2.27
None of These Candidates		25,577	2.65	–0.22
Total votes		965,753	100.0	
Democratic gain from Republican				

== Secretary of State ==
Incumbent Republican secretary of state Barbara Cegavske ran for re-election to a second term.

2018 Nevada Secretary of State election
Party	Candidate	Votes	%	±%
Republican	Barbara Cegavske (incumbent)	467,880	48.91	–1.49
Democratic	Nelson Araujo	461,551	48.25	+2.10
None of These Candidates		27,200	2.84	–0.61
Majority		6,329	0.66	–3.59
Total votes		956,631	100.00	
Republican hold		Swing	–1.80	

== Treasurer ==
Incumbent Republican state treasurer Dan Schwartz did not run for re-election to a second term and instead ran unsuccessfully for governor.

2018 Nevada State Treasurer election
Party	Candidate	Votes	%	±%
Democratic	Zach Conine	459,874	47.70	+6.20
Republican	Bob Beers	453,748	47.06	−4.39
None of These Candidates		27,431	2.84	-0.62
Independent American	William Hoge	23,146	2.40	N/A
Total votes		964,199	100.0	
Democratic gain from Republican				

== Controller ==
Incumbent Republican Controller Ron Knecht lost re-election to a second term.

2018 Nevada State Controller election
Party	Candidate	Votes	%	±%
Democratic	Catherine Byrne	487,068	50.60	+12.96
Republican	Ron Knecht (incumbent)	445,099	46.24	–6.29
None of These Candidates		30,500	3.17	–1.25
Total votes		962,667	100.0	
Democratic gain from Republican				

== State legislature ==
=== Nevada Senate ===
11 out of 21 seats in the Nevada Senate were up for election in 2018.

=== Nevada Assembly ===
All 42 seats in the Nevada Assembly were up for election in 2018. Democrats gained two seats.

== State Judicial Branch ==
=== Supreme Court Seat C ===
Incumbent justice Michael Cherry, who has served on the Nevada Supreme Court since 2007, did not run for re-election to a third term.

==== Primary election ====
===== Candidates =====
- Leon Aberasturi, judge of the Lyon County District Court (Third Judicial District)
- Elissa Cadish, judge of the Clark County District Court (Eighth Judicial District)
- Alan Lefebvre, Las Vegas attorney
- John Rutledge, Carson City attorney, Democratic candidate for Governor of Nevada in 2014
- Jerome Tao, judge of the Nevada Court of Appeals

===== Results =====
Primary results by county Cadish: 20–30%; 30–40%; 40–50%; None: 20–30%; 30–40%; Aberasturi: 20–30%; 30–40%; 40–50%; Lefebvre: 30–40%

Nonpartisan primary results
Party	Candidate	Votes	%
Nonpartisan	Elissa Cadish	111,079	36.08
Nonpartisan	Jerome Tao	63,146	20.51
None of These Candidates		39,244	12.75
Nonpartisan	John Rutledge	38,161	12.40
Nonpartisan	Leon Aberasturi	34,832	11.31
Nonpartisan	Alan Lefebvre	21,395	6.95
Total votes		307,857	100.0

==== General election ====
===== Results =====
Results by county Cadish: 30–40%; 40–50%; 50–60%; Tao: 30–40%; 40–50%

2018 Nevada Supreme Court Justice, Seat C
Party	Candidate	Votes	%
Nonpartisan	Elissa Cadish	404,206	45.30
Nonpartisan	Jerome Tao	289,309	32.42
None of These Candidates		198,730	22.27
Total votes		892,245	100.0

=== Supreme Court Seat F ===
Incumbent justice Michael L. Douglas, who has served on the Nevada Supreme Court since 2004, pledged to retire in January 2019.

Court of Appeals Chief Judge Abbi Silver ran for the seat unopposed.

==== Results ====
Results by county Silver: 60–70%; 70–80%

2018 Nevada Supreme Court Justice, Seat F
Party	Candidate	Votes	%
Nonpartisan	Abbi Silver	614,353	71.47
None of These Candidates		245,226	28.53
Total votes		859,579	100.0

=== Supreme Court Seat G ===
Incumbent justice Lidia S. Stiglich, who was appointed by Governor Brian Sandoval in 2017, was eligible to run for a first full term.

==== Candidates ====
- Mathew Harter, judge of the Clark County District Court (Eighth Judicial District - Family Court Division Department N)
- Lidia Stiglich, incumbent justice of the Nevada Supreme Court

===== Results =====
Results by county Stiglich: 30–40%; 40–50%; 50–60%; Harter: 30–40%; 40–50%

2018 Nevada Supreme Court Justice, Seat G
Party	Candidate	Votes	%
Nonpartisan	Lidia S. Stiglich (incumbent)	413,471	46.60
Nonpartisan	Mathew Harter	272,652	30.73
None of These Candidates		201,148	22.67
Total votes		887,271	100.0
