= Los Padres League =

High school athletic conference in California

The Los Padres League was a high school athletic conference in California that was part of the CIF Southern Section (CIF-SS). Member schools were located in San Luis Obispo and northern Santa Barbara counties. The league was dissolved in 2018 after most of its member schools left the CIF-SS for the CIF Central Section and formed a new conference, the Central Coast Athletic Conference, with members of the Pac-8 League. The three southernmost Los Padres League members — Lompoc, Cabrillo, and Santa Ynez high schools — remained in the CIF-SS as part of the Channel League.

== Member schools ==
As of the 2014–15 school year, the schools in the league were:

- Cabrillo High School
- Lompoc High School
- Morro Bay High School
- Nipomo High School
- Orcutt Academy High School
- Santa Maria High School
- Santa Ynez High School
- Templeton High School

=== Football ===
- Cabrillo High School
- Lompoc High School
- Pioneer Valley High School
- St. Joseph High School
- Santa Ynez High School
