= Candaele =

Candaele is a surname. Notable people with the surname include:

- Casey Candaele (born 1961), American baseball player and coach
- Kelly Candaele, American politician, filmmaker, teacher, and writer
