= Jerome Long =

American football player (born 1990)

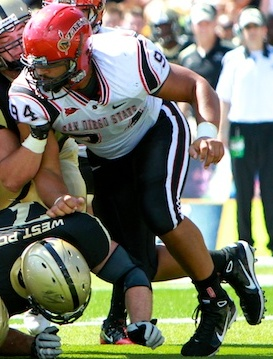
- Long with the San Diego State Aztecs in 2011

No. 70
- Position: Defensive tackle

Personal information
- Born: April 9, 1990 (age 36); Riverside, California, U.S.
- Listed height: 6 ft 4 in (1.93 m)
- Listed weight: 295 lb (134 kg)

Career information
- High school: Morro Bay (Morro Bay, California)
- College: San Diego State
- NFL draft: 2012: 7th round, 218th overall pick

Career history
- Kansas City Chiefs (2012)*; Jacksonville Jaguars (2012); Dallas Cowboys (2013)
- * Offseason or practice squad member only

Awards and highlights
- Second-team All-MWC (2011)

Career NFL statistics
- Games played: 3
- Stats at Pro Football Reference

Jerome Long (born April 9, 1990) is an American former professional football player who was a defensive tackle in the National Football League (NFL). He played college football for the San Diego State Aztecs and was selected by the Kansas City Chiefs in the seventh round of the 2012 NFL draft.

== Early life ==
He is a graduate of Morro Bay High School. As a senior for the Pirates in 2007, Long made 68 tackles, had 4.5 sacks, and earned Cal-Hi Sports all-state first-team defensive accolades, while also playing snaps as a blocking tight end, as the team went 10-0 in the regular season, winning the Los Padres League title.

Long also wrestled for MBHS in the heavyweight class, advancing to the state championship meet.

== College career ==
Long played college football at San Diego State University, where he majored in math.

During his senior year with the Aztecs, he recorded 73 tackles and five sacks, catching the eyes of multiple NFL scouts.

Long was selected as the Mountain West Defensive Player of the Week on September 13, 2011, and was chosen for 2011 all-conference second-team honors. He was invited to play in the Casino Del Sol All-Star Game in Tucson, Arizona following the year.

== Professional career ==
Long was selected by the Kansas City Chiefs in the 7th round in the 2012 NFL Draft. He was signed off the Chiefs practice squad by the Jacksonville Jaguars on December 28, 2012. He was then released on April 29, 2013.

Long was signed by the Dallas Cowboys on June 24, 2013, and was released after playing in three regular-season games, on September 24, 2013.
