= Pac-8 League =

Defunct high school athletic conference

The Pac-8 League was a high school athletic conference in California that was affiliated with the CIF Southern Section (CIF-SS). Member schools were located in San Luis Obispo and northern Santa Barbara counties. Prior to the 2014–15 school year, the conference was known as the Pac-7 League; Mission Prep High School joined as the eighth member. The Pac-8 League was dissolved in 2018 after its member schools left the CIF-SS for the CIF Central Section and formed a new conference, the Central Coast Athletic Conference, with members of the Los Padres League.

== Member schools ==
As of the 2014–15 school year, the schools in the league were:

- Arroyo Grande High School
- Atascadero High School
- Mission College Preparatory High School
- Paso Robles High School
- Pioneer Valley High School
- Righetti High School
- San Luis Obispo High School
- St. Joseph High School

=== Football ===
- Arroyo Grande High School
- Atascadero High School
- Paso Robles High School
- Righetti High School
- San Luis Obispo High School
