= Mark Velasquez =

American Photographer

- Born: Santa Maria, California, United States
- Occupations: Fry cook, fine art photography

Mark Velasquez is a photographer who competed on the first season of Bravo's reality television competition, Work of Art: The Next Great Artist.

== Early life ==
Velasquez attended and was an altar boy at St. Mary of the Assumption School and St. Louis de Montfort School. He attended St. Joseph High School (Santa Maria, California) and Cornish College of the Arts (Seattle, Washington) where he studied drawing, sculpture and performance art. Velasquez is an Eagle Scout and a member of the Elks. He has worked at his family's restaurant Tom's Take-Out since he was 14 years old in a variety of roles, most notably as a fry cook. He realized his love for photography after he began photographically documenting his own performance art pieces.

== Influences ==
While Velasquez's imagery can be alluring and often features scantily clad women, he cites Norman Rockwell as his primary inspiration. "Rockwell used people from his small town, his friends, neighbors, children ... making art from what you have around you."

== Career ==
=== Work of Art: The Next Great Artist ===
In August 2009 Velasquez participated in the Los Angeles, California open casting call for Bravo TV's art-themed reality television program Work of Art: The Next Great Artist. He was selected to be a contestant and competed on the program for 8 of 10 episodes until being voted off during episode 8: Opposites Attract, a Heaven and Hell-themed collaborative challenge with co-contestant Peregrine Honig. Honig wanted to depict hell through Velasquez's abdominal scar, a visual record of his bout with diverticulitis. While Mark initially fought back, saying that he didn't feel that the scar represented hell, he eventually acquiesced. The judges found the concept "uninspiring and clichéd." Host China Chow notably "fought back tears" while announcing the judges' decision that Velasquez would not continue.

=== Show & Tell ===
May 2010 marked the publication of Show & Tell, an 80-page hard-cover book collecting Velasquez's photographs of six models who represent milestones in his early career. The book includes ruminations on his experiences and relationships with each model and how both have changed over the course of their friendships.

=== NSFW magazine ===
In November 2010 Velasquez launched NSFW magazine with collaborator Michael Neff. NSFW, an acronym for Not Safe For Work, is a quarterly publication. Each issue is centered on a theme and features photographs and writings by Velasquez, a column written by Hilary Underwood, and photographs of model Kacie Marie.
