= Patricia Lee =

Patricia Lee may refer to:

- Patricia Taylor (née Lee, 1929–2024), Australian-born Canadian microbiologist and virologist
- Patricia Lee (judge) (born 1974 or 1975), American lawyer
- Patricia Ja Lee (born 1976 or 1977), American actress
