= Tracy Gray (investor) =

American investor

Tracy D. Gray
- Born: 1962 (age 63–64); Omaha, Nebraska, U.S.
- Other name: Tracy D. Gray-Barkan
- Education: University of California, Santa Barbara (BA); University of California, Berkeley (MBA); Columbia University (MBA)
- Occupations: Investor, Venture capitalist
- Known for: Forbes 50 over 50, Founder of The 22 Fund, supporting women in business

Tracy D. Gray is an American investor and a Forbes 50 over 50 recipient. Gray is the founder of The 22 Fund, a social-impact investment firm focused on supporting women and minority-owned businesses in green technologies, manufacturing, and export, and We Are Enough, a nonprofit dedicated to educating women on investing in women-owned businesses. She has served under Los Angeles, CA mayors Antonio Villaraigosa and Karen Bass. She has worked in aeronautics, politics, and venture capital.

== Early life and education ==
Gray was born in Omaha, Nebraska, to Margie and Thomas Gray and spent her childhood traveling as an "Air Force brat" before her family settled in Vandenberg Village, California, just north of Lompoc, California. She attended Cabrillo High School.

Gray later enrolled at the University of California, Santa Barbara where she earned a B.S. in mathematical sciences and aeronautics, and dual MBAs from Columbia University and U.C. Berkeley.

== Career ==
Gray began her professional career as a mission monitor and systems engineer for a NASA contractor working on the Space Shuttle Program, where she was the only woman on her engineering team and one of few Black engineers. Gray was vocal about her progressive political beliefs and was reported for "subversive behavior." Although the FBI dismissed the case, she decided to leave her position.

She briefly worked in the music industry before joining a venture capital firm in 1999. During this time, she realized that few proposals came from women or minorities and she left the business in 2002.

Gray's 2015 Tedx Talk, “Why It’s Time for Women to Be Sexist with Venture Capital,” prompted her to create the nonprofit We Are Enough.

Gray founded The 22 Fund in 2018 at the age of 55 to address the inequalities she saw in her other professions. Gray describes the goals of The 22 Fund as to "invest in companies to increase their export capacity and to create quality, clean, sustainable jobs of the future in underserved, low- to moderate-income communities." Business Insider describes the primary goal of The 22 Fund as transforming the manufacturing industry with a secondary goal of giving underrepresented founders a voice. Most investments are made in technology companies located outside of Silicon Valley.

Gray also serves as a Board Director for Applied Digital Solutions, Inc. and the California State University, Dominguez Hills Philanthropic Foundation endowment. She is also a member of Melinda Gates' Pivotal Venture's Women of Color Advisory Council and the PGIM Real Estate's Impact Advisory Council.

Gray was the first Social Impact Fellow at the UC Berkeley Haas Business School's Center for Equity, Gender, and Leadership and an Executive-in-Residence at the Los Angeles Cleantech Incubator (LACI).

== Political work ==
From 2009-2013, Gray served as Senior Advisor for International Business to Antonio Villaraigosa when he was Mayor of Los Angeles.

Los Angeles Mayor Karen Bass appointed Gray to serve on the city's Commission on the Status of Women.

== Personal life ==
Gray currently lives in Los Angeles and is an avid traveler. She regularly practices yoga, Pilates, and meditation. She has been previously known as Tracy D. Gray-Barkan.

== Publications ==
- "How Foundations Fail Diverse Fund Managers and How to Fix It" by Tracy Gray and Emilie Cortes

== Honors and awards ==
- Featured in 200 Women Who Will Change the Way You See the World
- Badass Women in Green award from the California League of Conservation Voters (2019)
- Forbes 50 Over 50-Investment (2023)
