= Maple High School =

There are multiple Maple High Schools:

- Maple High School (Lompoc, California) in Lompoc, California.
- Maple High School (Maple, Ontario), in Maple, Ontario.
