= Lompoc Unified School District =

School district in California

Address
- 1301 North A Street Lompoc, California, 93436; United States

District information
- Type: Public
- Grades: K–12
- NCES District ID: 0622410

Students and staff
- Students: 9,231 (2020–2021)
- Teachers: 436.0 (FTE)
- Staff: 493.92 (FTE)
- Student–teacher ratio: 21.17:1

Other information
- Website: www.lusd.org

The Lompoc Unified School District is located in the City of Lompoc, California and operates schools in and around the city, servicing Lompoc, Mission Hills, Vandenberg Village, and Vandenberg Air Force Base.

The school district's Superintendent is Dr. Clara Finneran.

== Schools ==
=== Elementary schools ===
- Buena Vista Elementary School
- Clarence Ruth Elementary School
- Crestview Elementary School
- Leonora Fillmore Elementary School
- Arthur Hapgood Elementary School
- La Cañada Elementary School
- La Honda Elementary School
- Los Berros Elementary School
- Miguelito Elementary School

=== Middle schools ===
- Lompoc Valley Middle School
- Vandenberg Middle School

=== High schools ===
- Cabrillo High School
- Lompoc High School
- Maple High School

== Home School Programs ==
- Mission Valley

== Adult education ==
- Adult education program
