= 1917 Cal Poly Mustangs football team =

American college football season

1917 Cal Poly Mustangs football
- Conference: Independent
- Record: 2–1
- Head coach: D. W. Schlosser (3rd season)

The 1917 Cal Poly Mustangs football team represented California Polytechnic School, now California Polytechnic State University, in the 1917 college football season. Led by D. W. Schlosser in his third and final season as head coach, Cal Poly compiled a record of 2–1 and were outscored by their opponents 36 to 35.

Cal Poly did not field a team during the 1918 college football season due to the influenza pandemic; the team returned to play in 1919. Cal Poly was a two-year school until 1941.

== Schedule ==
Date	Opponent	Site	Result
October 11	11th Coast Guard	San Luis Obispo, CA	W 10–7
November 9	Atascadero High School	San Luis Obispo, CA	W 25–0
November 29	11th Coast Guard	San Luis Obispo, CA	L 0–29
