= Michael P. Gibbons =

American judge

Chief Judge of the Nevada Court of Appeals
- Incumbent
- Assumed office March 21, 2019
- Preceded by: Abbi Silver

Judge of the Nevada Court of Appeals
- Incumbent
- Assumed office January 5, 2015
- Appointed by: Brian Sandoval
- Preceded by: position established

Personal details
- Education: University of California at Los Angeles; University of Idaho College of LawJ.D.

Michael P. Gibbons is a judge of the Nevada Court of Appeals, currently serving as chief judge.

== Education and career ==
Gibbons received his undergraduate degree from the University of California at Los Angeles and his J.D. from University of Idaho College of Law in 1980. After law school, Gibbons clerked for judge Howard D. McKibben. Gibbons then served as a chief deputy district attorney for Douglas County. In 1994, Gibbons was elected to the Ninth Judicial District Court. He was reelected four consecutive times.

In December 2014, he was appointed to the Court of Appeals. In March 2019, Gibbons replaced judge Abbi Silver as chief judge.

Gibbons is the brother of former Justice of the Nevada Supreme Court Mark Gibbons.
