= Chelsea Johnson =

American pole vaulter (born 1983)

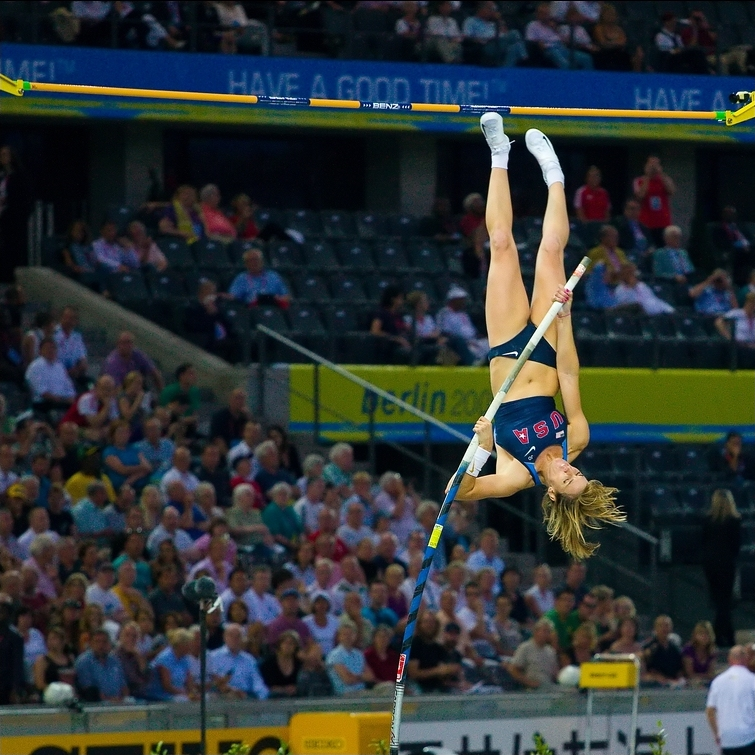
- Johnson at the 2009 World Championships

Personal information
- Full name: Chelsea Johnson
- Nationality: American
- Born: December 20, 1983 (age 42) Atascadero, California

Sport
- Country: United States
- Sport: Athletics
- Event: Pole vault

Achievements and titles
- World finals: 2nd at the 2009 World Championships in Athletics
- Personal best(s): Pole vault: 4.73m (2008)
Medal record
Women's athletics
Representing the United States
World Championships
Silver medal – second place	2009 Berlin	Pole vault

Chelsea Johnson (born December 20, 1983, in Atascadero, California) is a former American pole vaulter. She is the daughter of Jan Johnson, who won three NCAA championships and a bronze medal in the pole vault at the 1972 Summer Olympics. She won the silver medal at the 2009 World Championships in Athletics, but retired from the sport two years later.

== Career ==
Coached by her father while at Atascadero High School in central California, Chelsea won the pole vault at the 2002 CIF California State Meet. Two years earlier she had placed fifth in the 300 hurdles, behind future World Championship performers Lashinda Demus and Nichole Denby.

As a college athlete at UCLA, Johnson is a two-time NCAA champion, having won the pole vault at the 2004 NCAA Track and Field Championship and the 2006 NCAA Indoor Track and Field Championship.

At the 2009 World Athletics Championships in Berlin, Johnson tied for silver alongside Monika Pyrek of Poland with a jump of 4.65 metres. The following year, she won at the Millrose Games and was selected for the 2010 World Indoor Championships. Johnson did not qualify to compete in the pole vault final, finishing in 11th place in the qualification round.

She decided to retire from the sport at the age of 27, saying that her enthusiasm for competition had waned.

== Personal bests ==
Event	Best (m)	Venue	Date
Pole vault (outdoor)	4.73	Los Gatos	June 26, 2008
Pole vault (indoor)	4.62	Flagstaff	February 19, 2010
