= Roland Solomon =

American football player (born 1956)

No. 46, 28, 39
- Position: Cornerback

Personal information
- Born: February 6, 1956 (age 70); Fort Worth, Texas, U.S.
- Listed height: 5 ft 11 in (1.80 m)
- Listed weight: 180 lb (82 kg)

Career information
- High school: Cabrillo
- College: Utah
- NFL draft: 1979: undrafted

Career history
- Buffalo Bills (1979)*; Dallas Cowboys (1980); Buffalo Bills (1980); Denver Broncos (1981)
- * Offseason or practice squad member only
- Stats at Pro Football Reference

Roland Howard Solomon ( February 6, 1956 - March 8, 2019) was an American football cornerback in the National Football League (NFL) for the Buffalo Bills, Dallas Cowboys, and the Denver Broncos.

He played for Cabrillo High School of Lompoc, California, also excelling in track and field.

Solomon then went on to compete in college football at the University of Utah.

He died March 8, 2019.
