= Kathryn Parker Almanas =

American photographer

- Education: Yale University
- Known for: photography

Kathryn Parker Almanas is a photographer best known for appearing on Bravo's Work of Art: The Next Great Artist.

== Life ==
Almanas graduated from Yale University's Master of Fine Arts program in 2007. Her work is inspired by Dutch Golden Age painting and the Age of Enlightenment. She has Crohn's disease.

== Exhibitions ==
- The Intimate Collection, Yellow Peril Gallery, Providence, RI, 2016 Kathryn ) Parker's work has also been displayed in solo and group exhibitions in major U.S cities like Boston, Miami, Philadelphia and Chicago.
