= Leon Lim =

Leon Lim (born in Kedah, Malaysia) is an artist, designer and photographer who was schooled in Kedah and Penang and lives in New York City. He has been profoundly deaf since birth and his deafness developed his strong sense of seeing. His independence began at the age of 14 when he started to live alone in Penang. He received his Bachelor of Fine Arts degree from Rochester Institute of Technology, New York. He competed in the second season of the Bravo television network's reality television series Work of Art: The Next Great Artist.

== Life and work ==
=== Early life ===
In 1992, Lim moved to Penang, Malaysia for high school, Federation School for the Deaf (later known as SMK Pendidikan Khas Persekutuan). Lim graduated from his high school in 1997 took a De Montfort University of United Kingdom program at the Equator Academy of Art in Penang. After more than two years, Lim received a full five-year scholarship to attend Rochester Institute of Technology. While studying at RIT, Lim discovered his passion for design, photography, film and architecture. After his graduation from RIT, Lim settled in New York City.

=== Early work ===
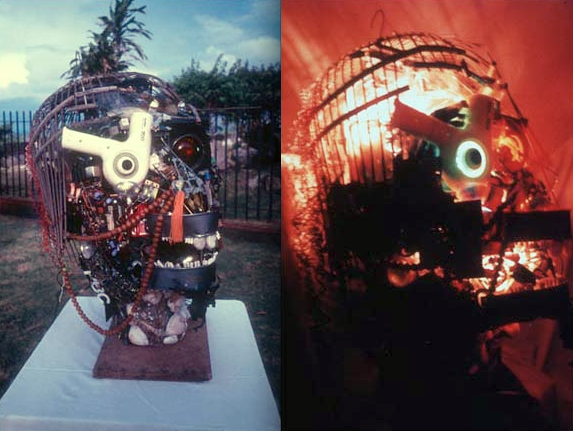
The Recycled Head Anatomy in George Town, Penang

In 1998, Lim created his first sculptural installation, The Recycled Head Anatomy with old objects such as bulbs, broken glasses, steel cans, toys, and electronic and plastic media found around the streets of George Town. That sculpture allowed Lim understand about the possibility of transformation and how one cultural object or gesture may turn into another.

In 1999, Lim reached out to various organizations and newspapers for a grant to do his first art project, “What is in the Deaf’s Mind?” with the help of his former teacher, Vicky Teoh. Teoh had spoken to several representatives of the companies by phone for Lim. He received three sponsors, including 500 cans of acrylic colors from the Hai Kuang Sdn. Bhd, a manufacturer of Pelaka paints; old newspapers and grants from the two local newspapers, The Star (Malaysia) and The Sun (Malaysia). Lim directed 80 deaf students of ages 8–16 to make a big canvas by using old newspapers and to paint their faces and bodies to express their own worlds onto canvas.

=== Recent work ===
Lim has been creating works ranging from paintings and sculptures to interior/architectural models and graphic design to multimedia and art installations and photographs. The solo voyager, who has traveled to more than 33 countries worldwide, often explores themes of heritage preservation, social segregation, mortality, interactive communication, and the politics of identity and culture. His voyages inspired his work which is an investigation of the diversity of human expression, built environment, sociological experience, and cross-cultural experience.

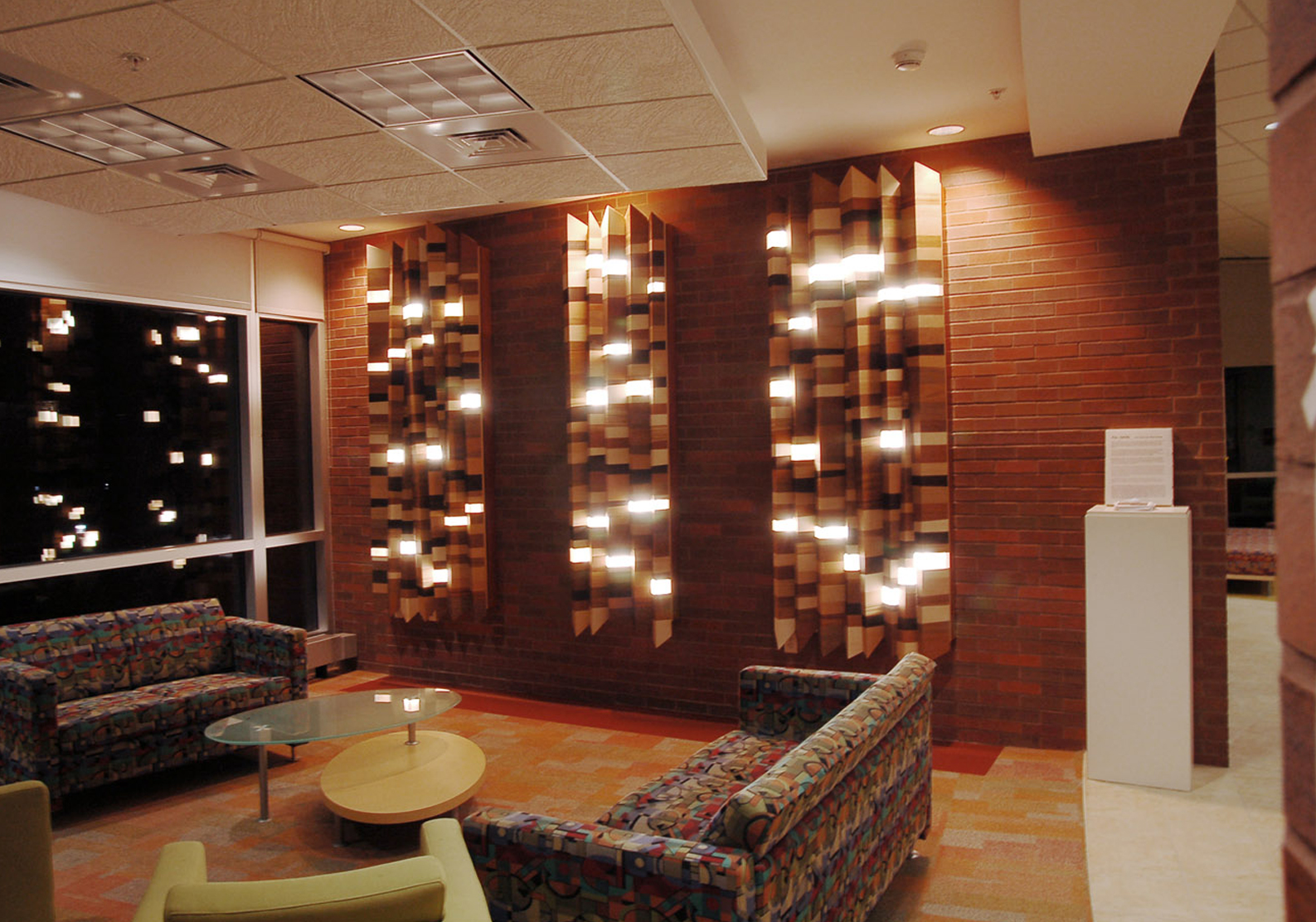
The 3(656) at the National Technical Institute for the Deaf

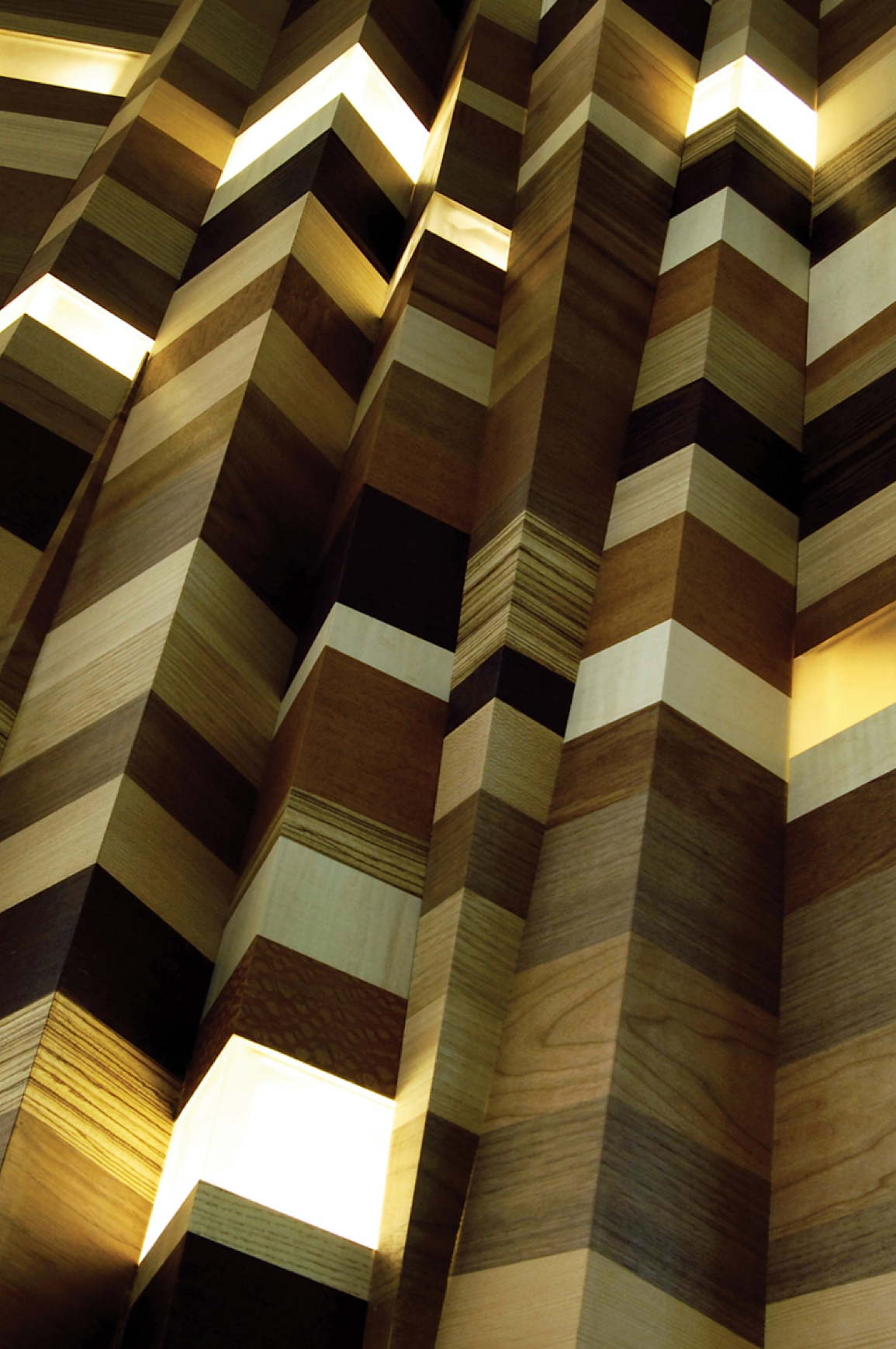
The 3(656) at the National Technical Institute for the Deaf

In addition to his artistic pursuits, Lim has participated in heritage-conservation research and gave a lecture of "George Town Contemporary" at Penang Heritage Centre, George Town, Penang (Pusat Warisan Pulau Pinang) with the help of Khoo Salma. Also, Lim served as an Art Director and Set Designer in US-based film production for short movies.

== Current status ==
Lim completed the second season of Work of Art: The Next Great Artist. To date, he is the first deaf contestant and star in any of the Bravo's vaunted 43 reality shows including "Top Chef", "Project Runway", and "The Real Housewives".

Lim was chosen for Prestige Magazine's November 2011 issue cover for The Art Issue. He was commissioned to create new artwork for two lifestyle magazines; Prestige and Esquire, whose the issues published in November 2011. In addition, his transformative portrait work of Julian Assange, was selected by TIME for its Person Of The Year 2010 edition.

In July 2010, Lim was commissioned by the Penang state government, George Town World Heritage Incorporated, and Penang Global Tourism, to create a new site-specific, public art installation, The Last Chairs for the George Town Festival 2010 inaugurated in conjunction with the UNESCO World Heritage Site's second anniversary. This exhibition marked Penang’s first public art in its new chapter on Contemporary Art in George Town as well as Lim's first exhibition in his native homeland of Malaysia, after his works have been exhibited in several other countries.

In June 2010, Lim’s art installations, Silent Story and Discommunicativeness which were exhibited in Washington DC, New York, Seoul and Beijing, were selected again to be part of the inaugural exhibition of the 5th Busan Media Festival in Busan, the second largest city in South Korea. Busan is the home of the Busan Biennale, a well renowned international contemporary art biennale.

Lim is one of 17 artists from New York City featured in the 2009 calendar for the Mayor of New York City.

Lim's multimedia installation has been exhibited internationally at Seoul's Total Museum of Contemporary Art, South Korea in July 2008 and Beijing's CAFA Art Museum, China in August 2009. His works have been exhibited at galleries such as the John F. Kennedy Center, Washington DC, the World Financial Center, New York City, Bevier Gallery, Rochester NY and Gallery R, Rochester NY.

Lim was commissioned in 2008 to create a permanent art installation, The 3(656) for a study lounge in the new center at Rochester Institute of Technology. The installation is an introduction of Lim's inspiration from the unknown history from the dream of building a college to the reality of a college to Lim's arrival. The grand opening of the installation was launched in May 2008.

In an interview with New Straits Times, Lim said, "People generally cannot see beyond a deaf person's physical handicap. Many of them have hidden talent. All that is required is a little prodding, a push. Give them a little encouragement. They are not as disabled as you might think."

== Bibliography ==
- Sonic Chromatic, 2009. ISBN 0-615-27718-7 and ISBN 978-0-615-27718-9
