= The Sucklord =

American pop artist and toy maker

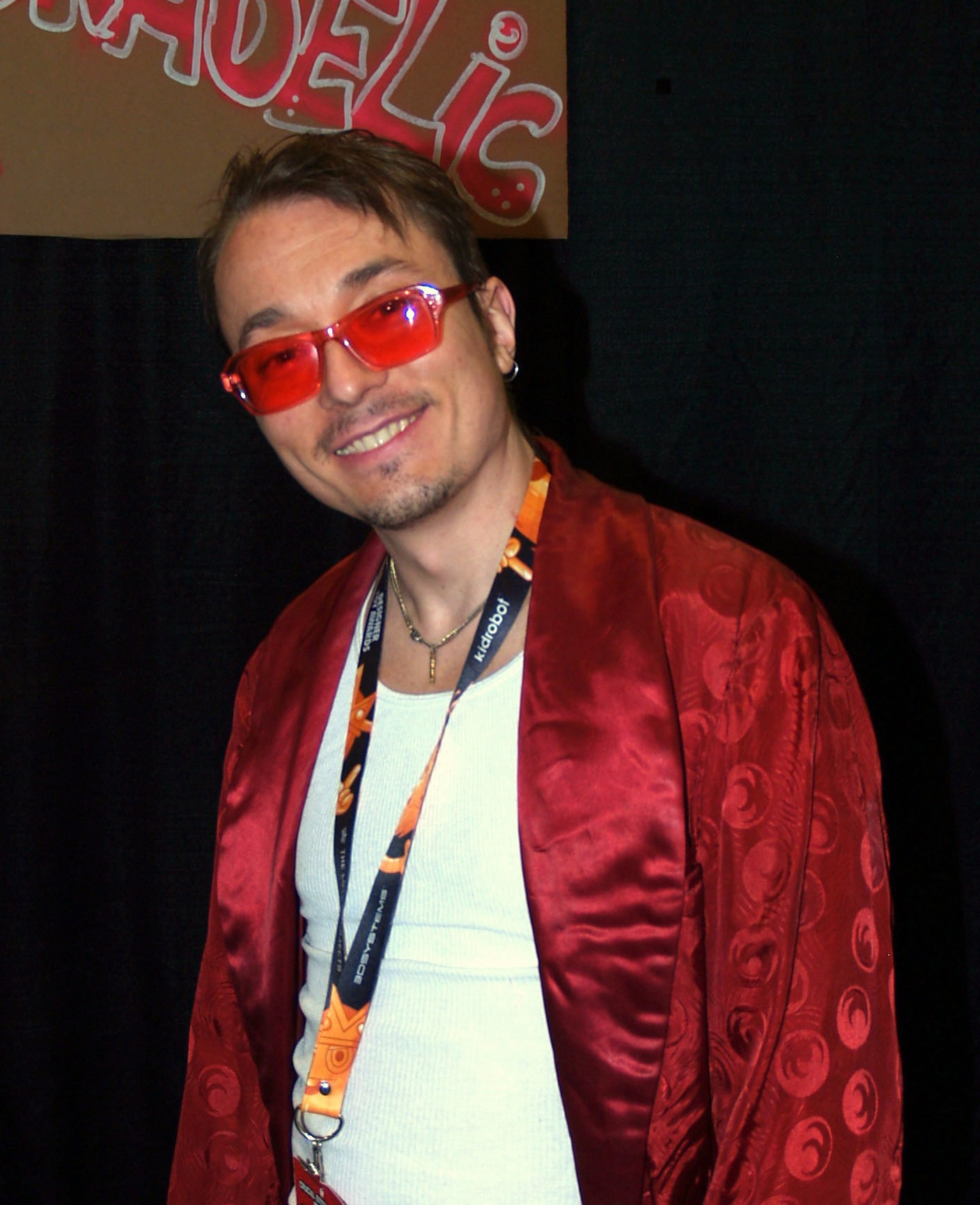
- The Sucklord in 2016
- Born: Morgan Phillips; March 27, 1969 (age 57); New York
- Known for: Figurines, toy design
- Movement: Pop art
- Website: suckadelic.com

The Sucklord (born Morgan Phillips, March 27, 1969) is a New York-based pop artist known for creating unlicensed action figures through his company, Suckadelic. His work draws heavily from pop culture and parody, particularly Star Wars. He has appeared on multiple reality television shows, including Work of Art: The Next Great Artist and Gallery Girls.

== Early life and education ==
Phillips was born in the West Village neighborhood of Manhattan and attended P.S. 41. He graduated in 1987 from the High School for the Humanities. He later studied art in Eugene, Oregon.

== Career ==
The Sucklord produces bootleg art toys and collectibles under the Suckadelic brand, often referencing science fiction franchises such as Star Wars. He appeared as a contestant on the second season of the Bravo series Work of Art: The Next Great Artist. In 2012, he was featured in an episode of Gallery Girls, where he collaborated with the show's cast to create and sell exclusive art toys in New York City's East Village.

A lifelong fan of Star Wars, The Sucklord has drawn attention for his custom-made reinterpretations of related merchandise. He contributed artwork to series five and six of Topps' Star Wars Galaxy trading cards and later produced his own series of parody trading cards, titled Suckpax. He also collaborated with New York artist Erik Foss on a bronze self-portrait sculpture, assisting in its initial design and assembly.

== Media appearances ==
Phillips made his reality TV debut in the 2004 premiere episode of VH1's Can't Get a Date. He has also produced the YouTube shows Toylords of Chinatown and Microsexuals.

== Exhibition ==
- January 2011, Suckadelic, Boo-Hooray Gallery, New York City.
