= Atascadero Unified School District =

School district in California

Address
- 5601 West Mall Atascadero, California, 93422; United States

District information
- Type: Public
- Grades: K–12
- Superintendent: Thomas Butler
- NCES District ID: 0603300

Students and staff
- Students: 4,397 (2020–2021)
- Teachers: 197.88 (FTE)
- Staff: 289.97 (FTE)
- Student–teacher ratio: 22.22:1
- Athletic conference: PAC-5

Other information
- Website: www.atasusd.org

Atascadero Unified School District is a public school district based in San Luis Obispo County, California.

== Schools ==
The following schools are within the Atascadero Unified School District.

- Atascadero High School
- Atascadero Middle School
- Atascadero Fine Arts Academy
- Carrisa Plains Elementary School
- Creston Elementary School
- Monterey Road Elementary School
- San Benito Elementary School
- San Gabriel Elementary School
- Santa Margarita Elementary School
- Santa Rosa Academic Academy
- Paloma Creek High School (Continuation)
- West Mall Alternative High School
