= St. Joseph High School (Santa Maria, California) =

Location
- 4120 South Bradley Road; Santa Maria, California 93455; United States; 34°52′55″N 120°25′4″W

Information
- Type: Private
- Motto: In Mente, Corde, Corpore, et Anima, imitari Christum (To image Christ in Mind, Heart, Body, and Soul)
- Religious affiliation: Roman Catholic
- Established: 1964; 62 years ago
- Principal: Anne Rigali
- Grades: 9-12
- Gender: Co-educational
- Enrollment: 400
- Colors: Green, White and Gold
- Athletics conference: CIF Central Section; Central Coast Athletic Association
- Team name: Knights
- Accreditation: Western Association of Schools and Colleges
- Yearbook: Lance
- Tuition: $11,000
- Website: www.sjhsknights.com

St. Joseph High School (SJHS) is a private, Roman Catholic high school in Santa Maria, California. It is located in the Roman Catholic Archdiocese of Los Angeles.

== History ==
St. Joseph High School opened in 1964 and graduated its first class in 1968.

In 2013, Shane Villalpando, a former St. Joseph High School student, was sentenced to one year in Santa Barbara County Jail and five years probation for having unlawful sex with underage teenagers at the high school. Villalpando was 18 years old at the time of one of the rapes while the victim of that incident was 14. Dean of students John Walker and principal Joseph Myers did not report a rape to law enforcement because they thought the incident had already been reported; however, both administrators were required by law to report suspected child abuse. Both resigned from their positions in 2012, were convicted of a misdemeanor, and were ordered to pay several hundred dollars in fines.

== Athletics ==
St. Joseph High School athletic teams are nicknamed the Knights. Since 2018, the school has competed in the Central Coast Athletic Association, which is affiliated with the CIF Central Section. Previously, SJHS was a long-time member of the CIF Southern Section (CIF-SS) and competed in the Pac-8 League.

== Notable alumni ==
- Mark Brunell, National Football League quarterback; won Super Bowl XLIV with New Orleans Saints
- Darian Mensah, college football quarterback for the Miami Hurricanes
- Tom Rehder, NFL offensive lineman; won Super Bowl XXV with New York Giants
- Bill Simas, Major League Baseball pitcher, Chicago White Sox
- Mark Velasquez, photographer and contestant on season one of Work of Art: The Next Great Artist
