= Vandenberg Village Community Services District =

The Vandenberg Village Community Services District is a special district in Vandenberg Village, California. Vandenberg Village is an unincorporated community in Santa Barbara County north of Lompoc, near Vandenberg Space Force Base. When Vandenberg Village was built in the 1960s and 1970s, most of the residents worked on the base. Today, their employers can be found throughout the central coast.

== General ==
Vandenberg Village Community Services District provides water and wastewater services to the community. It is governed by California Government Code Section 61000, et. seq. The district was established by the Vandenberg Village Association in 1983 as a local government agency. After approval by the Santa Barbara County Local Agency Formation Commission (LAFCO), the voters approved the District formation by a 1673 to 253 vote. $5.4 million in revenue bonds were approved by the voters in two separate bond measures in order to purchase the water and wastewater facilities of the private utility providing services to the area.

== Board of directors ==
The District is governed by a board of five directors elected in a general election every other year for four-year terms.
