= Don Milan =

American football player (born 1949)

No. 12
- Position: Quarterback

Personal information
- Born: January 12, 1949 (age 77); Glendale, California, U.S.
- Listed height: 6 ft 3 in (1.91 m)
- Listed weight: 200 lb (91 kg)

Career information
- High school: Santa Ynez (CA) Valley Union
- College: Cal Poly
- NFL draft: 1971: undrafted

Career history
- Oakland Raiders (1971–1973)*; Kansas City Chiefs (1972)*; Los Angeles Rams (1974)*; Green Bay Packers (1975)
- * Offseason or practice squad member only

Career NFL statistics
- Passing attempts: 32
- Passing completions: 15
- Completion percentage: 46.9%
- TD–INT: 1-1
- Passing yards: 181
- QB rating: 62.1
- Stats at Pro Football Reference

Don Milan is a former quarterback in the National Football League. He spent five seasons in the NFL. In his fifth year, with Green Bay, Milan was briefly the Packers' starting quarterback when head coach Dan Devine made a much-publicized midseason trade for Los Angeles Rams quarterback John Hadl.

== Early life ==
After graduating from Santa Ynez High School, Milan quarterbacked Cal Poly from 1968 through 1970. In his top season of 1970, he threw for 1,236 yards on 64-for-118 accuracy with 11 touchdown passes, and added 479 rushing yards on 89 carries, while earning All-CCAA Team and CCAA Back of the Year award honors and leading Cal Poly to an 8-2 record.

A speech major, Milan graduated with a total of 2,348 passing yards. He also compiled 1,107 rushing yards during his Mustang career.

== Professional football ==
Milan signed as an undrafted free agent with Oakland in April 1971. After being waived by the Raiders in the summer of 1972, the Kansas City Chiefs signed him in July. A month later, they traded him back to the Raiders for "future considerations."

During the preseason of 1972, Milan threw a 5-yard touchdown pass to Mike Siani in the Raiders' 34-9 exhibition win over the Rams.

On September 10, 1974, the Raiders cut Milan, and in October, the Los Angeles Rams signed him to be their number three quarterback. The Rams had traded John Hadl to Green Bay, elevating James Harris to starter and number three quarterback Ron Jaworski to the backup position. Milan dressed but never played in a game for the Rams, who waived him the following September. Milan didn't clear waivers, as the Packers signed him to back up Hadl in Green Bay.

Milan made one start for the Packers, week 8 at Chicago. He threw a 42-yard touchdown pass to Steve Odom in the second quarter of a 27-14 loss.

In the 1976 preseason, prior to retiring, Milan went 5-of-8 passing for 78 yards against Tampa Bay. Milan announced his retirement in August 1977.

NFL Statistics (Regular Season)
Year	Team	GP	GS	Comp.	Att.	Yds.	LG	TD	INT
1975 / Career	GB	7	1	15	32	181	56	1	1
