= Santa Ynez Valley Union High School =

High school in Santa Ynez, California

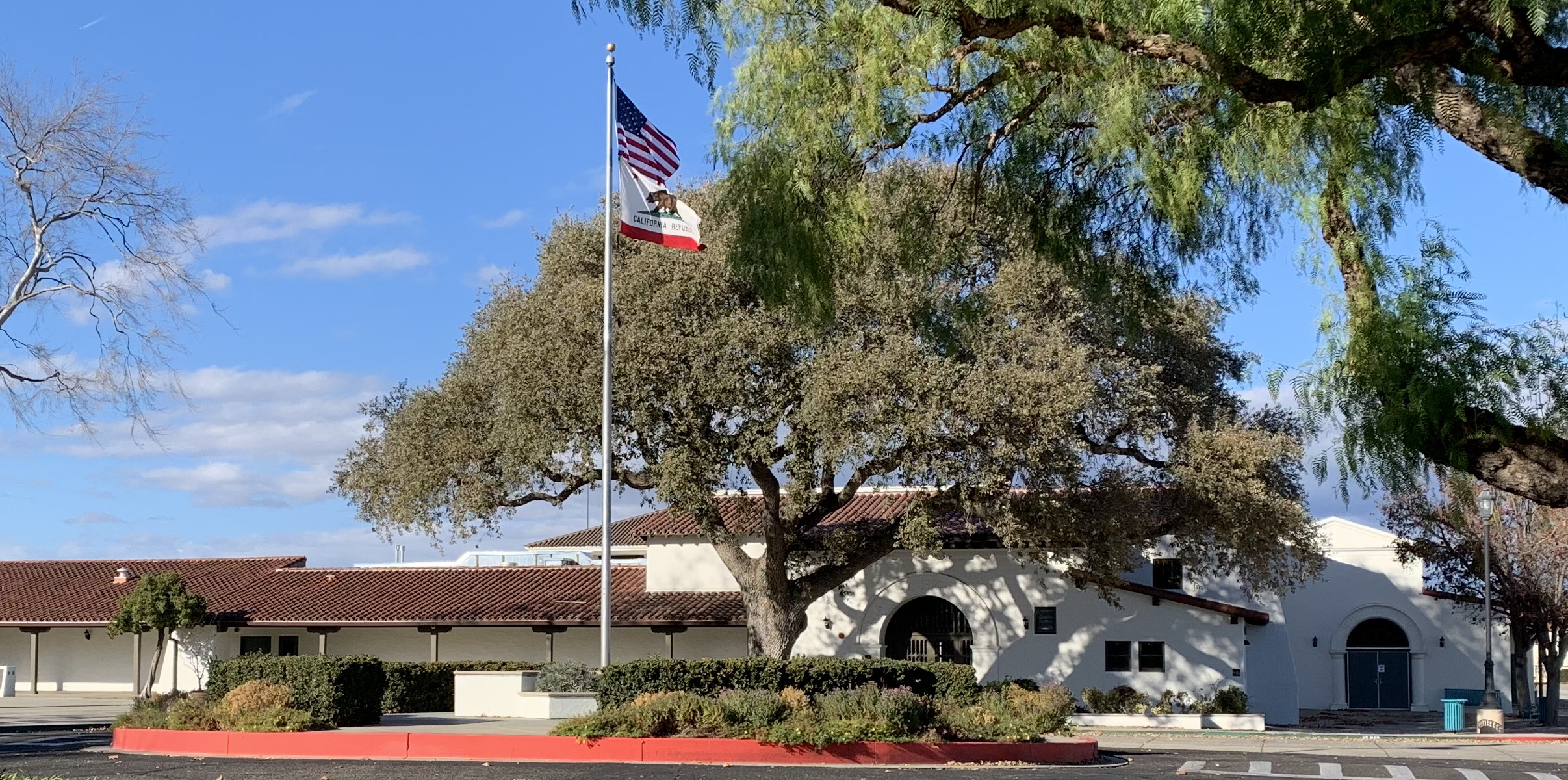

Location
- 2975 East Highway 246; Santa Ynez, CA
- Coordinates: 34.60761°N 120.09949°W

Information
- Type: Public
- Established: 1896
- School district: Santa Ynez Valley Union High School District
- Superintendent: Kimberly Sheehan
- Principal: Kimberly Sheehan
- Teaching staff: 41.44 (FTE)
- Grades: 9–12
- Enrollment: 801 (2024–2025)
- Student to teacher ratio: 19.33
- Colors: Orange and black
- Athletics conference: CIF Central Section; Central Coast Athletic Association
- Nickname: Pirates
- Website: Santa Ynez Valley Union High School

Santa Ynez Valley Union High School (SYHS) is a public high school in Santa Ynez, California, that serves students in grades 9–12 in the Santa Ynez Valley. As of the 2017–18 school year, 908 students were enrolled at the school.

== History ==
Santa Ynez High School was founded in 1896 and was originally located on Pine Street in Santa Ynez, now the site of Santa Ynez Elementary School. The original high school burned down in 1908, and its current facilities were built in 1937. In 2005, the school was named a California Distinguished School.

== Academics ==
SYHS offers Advanced Placement (AP) classes, with 41% of students participating. The school formerly participated in the International Baccalaureate Diploma Programme, but withdrew from the program in 2009.

== Athletics ==
Santa Ynez Valley Union High School athletic teams are nicknamed the Pirates. The school is a member of the CIF Central Section and began competing in the Mountain League starting in 2022. Prior to that, SYHS was a member of the CIF Southern Section and the now defunct Los Padres League.

Despite only being formed in 1992, the Santa Ynez boys' volleyball program qualified for the CIF-SS playoffs 29 years in a row and set CIF records with 19 consecutive league championships, 208 straight league wins, and four straight CIF-SS titles.

In 2019, the SYHS girls' track and field team captured the Channel League title after a perfect season.

== Notable alumni ==
- Erin Alexander, former WNBA player
- Mark Andrews, filmmaker
- Brian Asselstine, MLB outfielder with Atlanta Braves
- Jan Barrett, AFL offensive end with Oakland Raiders
- Thor Nis Christiansen, convicted serial killer
- Matt McKinney, AVP volleyball pro/vintner
- Don Milan, NFL quarterback with Green Bay Packers
- Eion Bailey American Actor
