= Bonnie A. Bulla =

American judge

Judge of the Nevada Court of Appeals
- Incumbent
- Assumed office February 13, 2019
- Appointed by: Steve Sisolak
- Preceded by: Abbi Silver

Personal details
- Born: Phoenix, Arizona
- Education: Arizona State University

Bonnie A. Bulla is a judge on the Nevada Court of Appeals. Originally appointed to the position, Bulla subsequently won election to a full term in November 2020.

== Education and career ==
Bulla grew up in Phoenix, Arizona and received her undergraduate degree in economics from Arizona State University in 1984 and her J.D. from ASU's Sandra Day O'Connor College of Law in 1987. After law school, Bulla moved to Nevada and entered private practice. Bulla's work included the litigation following the 1988 PEPCON disaster.

In 2007, Bulla was appointed as the Discovery Commissioner for Clark County’s Eighth Judicial District Court. There she resolved pretrial arguments regarding production of evidence in civil cases. In 2019, she was appointed by Governor Steve Sisolak to the Court of Appeal to fill a vacancy created by the election of Abbi Silver to the Nevada Supreme Court. In 2020, Bulla stated that another three-judge panel should be added to the Court of Appeals.

== Elections ==
- In 2020, Bulla defeated Susan Bush, a Clark County deputy public defender, for re-election to the Court of Appeals, receiving 42.2 percent of the vote.
