= Central Coast Athletic Association =

High school athletic conference in California

The Central Coast Athletic Association (CCAA) is a high school athletic conference in California that is affiliated with the CIF Central Section. The association was established in 2018 as the Central Coast Athletic Conference and consists of 16 schools in San Luis Obispo and Santa Barbara counties that previously were members of the CIF Southern Section and three of its constituent conferences, the Pac-8, the Los Padres League, and the Channel League.

In earlier decades, previously-branded leagues such as the Northern League, Central Coast League and Tri-County League were also home to several of the 16 total schools, realigned over the years largely due to enrollment, which today comprise the overall spectrum of the association. (The aforementioned Tri-County League, which was smaller than the peer Northern League and LPL in terms of enrollment, was originally entitled as such due to also including high schools from neighboring Kern and Fresno counties at the time, in addition to San Luis Obispo County.)

Briefly, the association also reached into the Pacific View and Channel leagues on a football basis, but heading into the fall of 2022, the alignment was simplified to revert to a more historical format when Cabrillo, Lompoc and Santa Ynez rejoined the CCAA's fellow 13 schools in the Central Section and, thus in turn, its Mountain and Ocean leagues. As the Santa Maria Times assessed of the unison of all 16 programs: "It's just two leagues and two counties. Again, a much more natural fit."

In some sports with individually-based results, such as track and field or wrestling, the association holds combined meets including almost all of the schools in one meet, regardless of assigned league; it also often announces awards and honors simultaneously. The CCAA, which spans the 805 area code, uses a system of promotion and relegation to place each school's teams, by sport and gender, into either of two leagues periodically based on performance.

== Member schools ==
- Arroyo Grande High School
- Atascadero High School
- Cabrillo High School
- Lompoc High School
- Mission College Preparatory High School
- Morro Bay High School
- Nipomo High School
- Orcutt Academy High School
- Paso Robles High School
- Pioneer Valley High School
- Righetti High School
- St. Joseph High School
- San Luis Obispo High School
- Santa Maria High School
- Santa Ynez Valley Union High School
- Templeton High School

== League Championships for Football ==
Area Football Titles (2022–present)
Season	Mountain League (W-L)	Ocean League (W-L)	Sunset League (W-L)
2025	Arroyo Grande (4-0)	Templeton (4-0)	Righetti / San Luis Obispo (co) (3-1)
2024	Arroyo Grande (4-0)	Nipomo (4-0)	San Luis Obispo (4-0)
2023	Arroyo Grande (7-0)	Atascadero (6-0)	-
2022	St. Joseph (7-0)	Atascadero (5-1)	-

Area Football Titles (2018-2021)
Season	Mountain League (W-L)	Ocean League (W-L)	Pacific View League (W-L)	Channel League (W-L)
2021	St. Joseph / Paso Robles / Arroyo Grande (co) (4-1)	Mission Prep (5-0)	Buena (5-0)	Pacifica (5-0)
2020	St. Joseph (5-0)	Nipomo (4-1)	Pacifica (5-0)	Lompoc (5-0)
2019	St. Joseph (3-0)	Templeton (3-0)	Oxnard (5-0)	Santa Barbara (5-0)
2018	St. Joseph (4-0)	Nipomo (5-0)	Oxnard (5-0)	Lompoc (5-0)

Area Football Titles (2014-2017)
Season	Pac-5 League (W-L)	Los Padres League (W-L)	Northern League (W-L)
2017	Paso Robles (4-0)	Lompoc (4-0)	Santa Maria (3-0)
2016	Arroyo Grande (4-0)	Lompoc (4-0)	Nipomo (4-0)
2015	Arroyo Grande (4-0)	Lompoc (4-0)	Mission Prep (4-0)
2014	Arroyo Grande / Atascadero / Paso Robles (co) (3-1)	Lompoc (4-0)	Nipomo / Morro Bay / Templeton (co) (3-1)

Area Football Titles (2006-2013)
Season	Pac-7 League (W-L)	Los Padres League (W-L)	East Sierra League (W-L)
2013	Atascadero (6-0)	Lompoc (6-0)	-
2012	St. Joseph / Arroyo Grande (co) (5-1)	Lompoc (6-0)	-
2011	Arroyo Grande (6-0)	Lompoc (6-0)	-
2010	Paso Robles (6-0)	Lompoc (5-1)	-
2009	Righetti (5-0)	St. Joseph (7-0)	Mission Prep (5-0)
2008	Atascadero (5-0)	St. Joseph (7-0)	Orange Cove (5-0)
2007	Atascadero / Paso Robles (co) (4-1)	Morro Bay (7-0)	-
2006	Atascadero (5-0)	St. Joseph (7-0)	-

Area Football Titles (2002-2005)
Season	Pac-5 League (W-L)	Los Padres League (W-L)	East Sierra League (W-L)
2005	Paso Robles (4-0)	Cabrillo / Lompoc (co) (5-1)	Templeton (5-0)
2004	Arroyo Grande (4-0)	Lompoc (6-0)	Central Valley Christian (5-0)
2003	Arroyo Grande (4-0)	Lompoc (6-0)	-
2002	San Luis Obispo / Paso Robles / Righetti (co) (3-1)	Lompoc (5-0)	-

Area Football Titles (1994-2001)
Season	Northern League (W-L)	Los Padres League (W-L)	Central Coast League (W-L)
2001	Arroyo Grande (4-0)	Paso Robles (5-0)	-
2000	San Luis Obispo (4-0)	Paso Robles (5-0)	-
1999	San Luis Obispo (4-0)	Paso Robles (5-0)	-
1998	Arroyo Grande (4-0)	Morro Bay / Santa Ynez / Paso Robles (co) (4-1)	-
1997	San Luis Obispo / Lompoc (co) (3-1)	Atascadero (5-0)	-
1996	Arroyo Grande (4-0)	Cabrillo / Atascadero (co) (4-1)	-
1995	Lompoc (4-0)	Atascadero (4-0)	Morro Bay (6-0)
1994	Lompoc (4-0)	Santa Ynez (4-0)	Morro Bay (5-0)

Area Football Titles (1975-1993)
Season	Northern League (W-L)	Los Padres League (W-L)	Tri-County League (W-L)
1993	Lompoc (4-0)	Atascadero / Paso Robles / Santa Ynez (co) (4-1)	Templeton (6-0)
1992	Lompoc (4-0)	St. Joseph (5-0)	Templeton (6-0)
1991	Arroyo Grande (4-0)	Atascadero (5-0)	Templeton (5-0)
1990	Lompoc (4-0)	Cabrillo (5-0)	Templeton / Mission Prep (co) (4-1)
1989	Lompoc (4-0)	Cabrillo (4-0)	Mission Prep (4-0)
1988	Santa Maria (4-0)	Atascadero (4-0)	Laton (5-0)
1987	Arroyo Grande (4-0)	Paso Robles / St. Joseph (co) (3-1)	Templeton (4-0)
1986	Lompoc (4-0)	Atascadero (4-0)	Templeton (6-0)
1985	Lompoc (4-0)	Cabrillo / Atascadero (co) (3-1)	Templeton (3-0)
1984	Righetti (4-0)	Cabrillo (4-0)	Templeton (6-0)
1983	Santa Maria (5-0)	Paso Robles (3-1)	El Paso de Robles School (6-0)
1982	Lompoc (5-0)	Atascadero (4-0)	Templeton / EPRS (co) (2-1)
1981	San Luis Obispo / Lompoc (co) (4-1)	Atascadero (4-0)	Templeton (6-0)
1980	Lompoc (5-0)	Atascadero (4-0)	Templeton / Modesto Christian (co) (4-1)
1979	Santa Maria (5-0)	Atascadero (5-0)	Coast Union (4-0)
1978	Lompoc (5-0)	Paso Robles (4-0)	Coast Union (4-0)
1977	Lompoc (5-0)	Santa Ynez (4-0)	Cuyama / Templeton (co) (3-1)
1976	Lompoc (5-0)	Paso Robles / Santa Ynez (co) (3-1)	-
1975	Santa Maria (5-0)	Paso Robles (4-0)	-
