= Steve Boadway =

American football player (born 1963)

No. 95
- Position: Linebacker

Personal information
- Born: June 20, 1963 (age 63); Bakersfield, California, U.S.
- Listed height: 6 ft 4 in (1.93 m)
- Listed weight: 240 lb (109 kg)

Career information
- High school: Lompoc (Lompoc, California)
- College: Arizona (1981–1984)
- NFL draft: 1985: undrafted

Career history
- Denver Broncos (1985)*; Detroit Lions (1987); Denver Broncos (1988)*
- * Offseason or practice squad member only

Awards and highlights
- Second-team All-Pac-10 (1984)
- Stats at Pro Football Reference

Steven Troy Boadway (born June 20, 1963) is an American former professional football player who was a linebacker for one season with the Detroit Lions of the National Football League (NFL). He played college football for the Arizona Wildcats. He was also a member of the Denver Broncos.

== Early life and college ==
Steven Troy Boadway was born on June 20, 1963, in Bakersfield, California. He attended Lompoc High School in Lompoc, California.

Boadway was a four-year letterman for the Arizona Wildcats of the University of Arizona from 1981 to 1984. He was a third-stringer his freshman year in 1981. He recorded one interception for 32 yards and one touchdown in 1982 and one interception for three yards in 1983, missing time due to injury in both years. As a senior in 1984, Boadway made one interception and earned Coaches second-team All-Pac-10 honors.

== Professional career ==
Boadway signed with the Denver Broncos after going undrafted in the 1985 NFL draft. He was released on August 20, 1985.

Boadway was signed by the Detroit Lions during the 1987 NFL players strike for $3,000 per week. He played in two games for the Lions before being placed on injured reserve on October 20, 1987.

Boadway signed with the Broncos again in 1988. He was a case manager at a halfway house in Phoenix, Arizona before signing with the Broncos. He was later released on July 28, 1988.

In 1990, Boadway joined the Ancona Dolphins of the Italian Football League, spending time at both linebacker and quarterback.

== Personal life ==
Boadway later became a teacher and coach at the high school and middle school level in Arizona.
