= Jerome T. Tao =

American judge (born 1966)

Judge of the Nevada Court of Appeals
- In office 2015 – January 1, 2023
- Appointed by: Brian Sandoval
- Preceded by: position established
- Succeeded by: Deborah Westbrook

Personal details
- Born: Jerome Tehyu Tao; 1966 (age 59–60)
- Education: Cornell University; George Washington University J.D.

Jerome T. Tao (born 1966) is a former Judge of the Nevada Court of Appeals.

== Education and career ==
Tao received his undergraduate degree from Cornell University and his J.D. from George Washington University Law School in 1992. After law school, Tau served as a Clark County Deputy District Attorney, Chief Deputy Public Defender, and as a civil attorney in private practice. From 1999 to 2001, Tao worked as a Senior Advisor to Democratic U.S. Senator Harry Reid. In January 2011, Tao was appointed by Nevada Governor Brian Sandoval to the Eighth Judicial District Court. In December 2014, he was appointed to the newly created Court of Appeals.

== Positions ==
During his supreme court campaign, Tao described himself as a "textualist," and was endorsed by the NRA Political Victory Fund.

== Elections ==
- In 2018, Tao lost to Elissa Cadish in the general election for Seat C on the Nevada Supreme Court.
- In 2016, Tao was unopposed for re-election to the Nevada Court of Appeals.
- In 2014, Tao defeated Nicholas Anthony Perrino for re-election to the Eighth Judicial District Court, receiving 67.4 percent of the vote.
- In 2012, Tao defeated Chris T. Rasmussen for re-election to the Eighth Judicial District Court, receiving 51.02 percent of the vote.

== External links section ==
- Judge Tau
- Jerome Tao at Ballotpedia
