= Donald Willis =

American football player (born 1973)

Santa Barbara City Vaqueros
- Title: Assistant head coach, defensive coordinator & defensive line coach

Personal information
- Born: July 15, 1973 (age 53); Goleta, California, U.S.
- Listed height: 6 ft 3 in (1.91 m)
- Listed weight: 325 lb (147 kg)

Career information
- High school: Cabrillo (Lompoc, California)
- College: Washington (1990–1993); North Carolina A&T (1994)
- NFL draft: 1995: undrafted

Career history

Playing
- Seattle Seahawks (1995); New Orleans Saints (1995–1997); → Amsterdam Admirals (1996); Tampa Bay Buccaneers (1998)*; Kansas City Chiefs (1999)*; (2000–2004)
- * Offseason or practice squad member only

Coaching
- Cabrillo HS (CA) (2009–2010) Assistant football coach; Santa Maria HS (CA) (2012) Head coach; Santa Barbara City College (2013) Offensive line & run game coordinator; Cabrillo HS (CA) (2014–2016) Head coach; Santa Barabara City College (2017–present) Assistant head coach, defensive coordinator & defensive line coach

Career NFL statistics
- Games played: 63
- Games started: 6
- Fumble recoveries: 1
- Stats at Pro Football Reference

Donald Kirk Willis (born July 15, 1973) is an American former professional football player who was a guard in the National Football League (NFL). He was signed by the Seattle Seahawks as an undrafted free agent in 1995. He played college football for the North Carolina A&T Aggies and Washington Huskies. Willis was the head coach at his high school alma mater, Cabrillo High School, in Lompoc, California. He also has coached track and field.

Willis also played for the New Orleans Saints and Kansas City Chiefs.
