= Abbi Silver =

American judge (born 1964)

Justice of the Nevada Supreme Court Seat F
- In office January 7, 2019 – September 30, 2022
- Preceded by: Michael L. Douglas
- Succeeded by: Patricia Lee

Chief Judge of the Nevada Court of Appeals
- In office January 3, 2017 – January 7, 2019
- Succeeded by: Michael P. Gibbons

Judge of the Nevada Court of Appeals
- In office December 17, 2014 – January 3, 2017
- Appointed by: Brian Sandoval
- Preceded by: position established
- Succeeded by: Bonnie A. Bulla

Judge of the Eighth Judicial District Court of Nevada
- In office 2008–2014

Judge of the Las Vegas Justice Court
- In office 2006–2008

Judge of the Las Vegas Municipal Court
- In office 2003–2006

Personal details
- Born: December 3, 1964 (age 61)
- Party: Republican
- Education: University of Nevada (BA); Southwestern Law School (JD)

Abbi Silver (born December 3, 1964) is an American attorney who served as a justice of the Nevada Supreme Court from 2019 to 2022.

== Education ==
Silver received her Bachelor of Arts in political science from the University of Nevada, Las Vegas in 1986 and her Juris Doctor from Southwestern Law School in Los Angeles, California.

== Career ==
After graduating law school, she worked as a judicial law clerk for Earle White, Jr. on the Eighth Judicial District Court. She then joined the Clark County District Attorney's Office and was ultimately assigned as the Chief Deputy District Attorney of the Special Victims Unit. During tenure at the District Attorney's office, she tried more than one hundred jury trials.

=== State judicial service ===
Silver was elected to the Las Vegas Municipal Court in 2003, the Las Vegas Justice Court in 2006, and to the Eighth Judicial District Court in 2008, and again in 2014. She was appointed to the Nevada Court of Appeals by Governor Brian Sandoval on December 17, 2014, and was sworn in on January 5, 2015. On January 3, 2017, she became Chief Judge of the Court of Appeals.

=== Nevada Supreme Court ===
Silver faced no challengers in the primary for the seat being vacated by Michael L. Douglas. She ran unopposed in the general election on November 8, 2018. She assumed office on January 7, 2019. On August 26, 2022, she announced her resignation from the Supreme Court, citing "'unforeseen circumstances' and a desire to spend more time with her family[.]", effective September 29, 2022.

== See also ==
- List of first women lawyers and judges in Nevada
- List of Jewish American jurists

Legal offices
| Preceded by Michael L. Douglas | Justice of the Nevada Supreme Court; 2019–2022 | Succeeded by Patricia Lee |
