= Peregrine Honig =

American painter (born 1976)

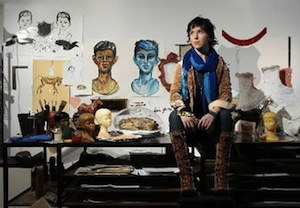
- Born: October 3, 1976 (age 49); San Francisco, California
- Education: Kansas City Art Institute, Ruth Asawa San Francisco School of the Arts
- Known for: Work of Art: The Next Great Artist
- Spouse: Mike Dillon

Peregrine Honig (born October 3, 1976) is an American artist. Honig's work is concerned with the relationship between pop culture, sexual vulnerability, social anxieties, the ethics of luxury, and trends in consumerism.

== Early life and education ==
Honig was born in San Francisco, California in 1976. She attended the Kansas City Art Institute.

== Career ==
In 1997, Honig started Fahrenheit Gallery, an artist-run space in Kansas City's industrial West Bottoms, where she showed artists with national and international reputations and inspired other young Kansas City artists to do the same. The gallery closed in 2010.

Honig appeared on season one of Bravo's artist reality television show, Work of Art: The Next Great Artist, which aired from June 9–August 11, 2010. She advanced to the final round, where she took second place after winner Abdi Farah and second runner-up, Miles Mendenhall.

== Works ==
Honig's work explores early sexual awakenings, the visual manifestation of disease, and the social anxieties of realized and fictional characters. Her work is in the collection of the Nelson-Atkins Museum of Art, the Art Institute of Chicago, and the Buffalo AKG Art Museum.

== Activism ==
While Honig's work expands beyond art and into activism through her businesses All is Fair in Love and Wear, and Birdies she was quoted as saying, "I identify as an artist, not an activist."

In 2016 Honig launched a Kickstarter to support the new business All is Fair in Love and Wear where 175 backers pledged $25,550. Honig has been credited with the creation of the original "We don't care" bathroom sign. After installing the original sign outside the restroom in Birdies, Honig sold copies of the original sign to 21C Durham, North Carolina to protest bill HB2. She has since indicated that the sale of these signs brought in the money needed to begin creating binder prototypes for All is Fair in Love and Wear.
