= Patricia Lee (judge) =

American judge (born 1974 or 1975)

Justice of the Nevada Supreme Court
- Incumbent
- Assumed office November 21, 2022
- Appointed by: Steve Sisolak
- Preceded by: Abbi Silver

Personal details
- Born: Patricia Thompson; 1974 or 1975 (age 50–51) Jeonju, South Korea
- Education: University of Southern California (BA); George Washington University (JD)

Patricia Lee (born 1974 or 1975) is an American lawyer who has served as a justice of the Nevada Supreme Court since 2022.

== Early life and education ==
Lee was born in Jeonju, South Korea to an African American military father and a native Korean mother. She graduated from Lompoc High School in 1993. She earned a Bachelor of Arts in psychology and communications from the University of Southern California in 1997 and a Juris Doctor from the George Washington University Law School in 2002.

== Career ==
From 2002 to 2022, Lee worked at the law firm Hutchison & Steffen, becoming partner in 2009.

=== Nevada Supreme Court ===
In October 2022, Lee was one of six applicants for the vacancy on the Nevada Supreme Court. On November 21, 2022, Governor Steve Sisolak appointed Lee as a justice of the Nevada Supreme Court to fill the seat left by the resignation of Justice Abbi Silver. She is the first African American woman and the first Asian American to serve on the Nevada Supreme Court.

== Personal life ==
Lee married her husband Ronnie in 2006 and they have two children.

Legal offices
Preceded by Abbi Silver	Justice of the Nevada Supreme Court; 2022–present	Incumbent
