= Kelly Candaele =

Canadian-born American filmmaker and politician

- Born: Vancouver, British Columbia
- Occupations: politician, writer, documentary filmmaker
- Years active: 1982-present
- Parent(s): Helen Callaghan, Robert Candaele

Kelly Candaele is a Canadian-born politician, filmmaker, teacher, and writer. For the past fifteen years, he has written extensively for the Los Angeles Times, the New York Times, The Nation and other national publications. While writing for the Los Angeles Times, he traveled to Ireland three times during President Bill Clinton’s attempts to push the Northern Ireland peace process forward. His journalistic work has focused primarily on the political developments in Los Angeles, history, athletics and culture. In addition to Northern Ireland he has worked as a journalist in Great Britain, Brazil, Sweden, Cuba, Spain, Vietnam, Argentina and India. He has lectured at Hebrew University of Jerusalem, Occidental College, and University of California, Irvine. He has been an Adjunct Associate Professor of Philosophy and Communications at California State University, Chico.

== Early life ==
His mother Helen Callaghan [4] played five seasons in the All-American Girls Professional Baseball League and won the batting title in 1945. He attended Lompoc High School in Lompoc, California. His brother Casey Candaele is a former Major League Baseball player for the Houston Astros and Montreal Expos and is currently manager for the Buffalo Bisons, the Toronto Blue Jays Triple-A affiliate.

== Film career ==
Kelly Candaele has produced and directed a number of documentary films.

=== A League of Their Own ===
His documentary film A League of Their Own, about his mother’s years as a professional baseball player in the 1940s, was awarded an Emmy as part of a public television series. He wrote the story for the Columbia Pictures feature film about the women’s league which starred Tom Hanks and Madonna. His mother Helen Callaghan was a left-handed center fielder who played five seasons in the All-American Girls Professional Baseball League and won the batting title in 1945.

=== Olof Palme - A Life In Politics ===
He produced and wrote an award-winning documentary on the life of assassinated Swedish Prime Minister Olof Palme. The film is narrated by actor Paul Newman.

=== When Hope & History Rhymed ===
His 2011 documentary, When Hope & History Rhymed, (title from the poem by Seamus Heaney) explores the aftermath of the Northern Ireland peace agreement of 1998.

=== El Clasico - More Than a Game ===
In 2010 he traveled to Spain to produce the documentary film El Clasico - More Than a Game, about the historic soccer (football) rivalry between Real Madrid and FC Barcelona. The hour-long film looks at Spanish history and politics through this athletic contest.

=== Goal Kolkata ===
Goal Kolkata is a film that is currently in production, about two soccer teams in Calcutta (Kolkata), India.

Heads, Hands, Hearts - Craftsmanship at Work

Candaele spent three years, from 2014 to 2017 filming the construction of the Wilshire Grand Hotel in downtown Los Angeles.

== Politics ==
He served on the board of trustees of the Los Angeles Community College District for four terms, having been first elected in June 1997. He was reelected in 2001, 2005, and 2009.
