= Work of Art: The Next Great Artist =

- Title card
- Starring: China Chow; Jerry Saltz; Jeanne Greenberg Rohatyn; Bill Powers; Simon de Pury
- Country of origin: United States
- No. of seasons: 2
- No. of episodes: 20

Production
- Executive producers: Sarah Jessica Parker; Eli Holzman
- Running time: 60 minutes

Original release
- Network: Bravo
- Release: June 9, 2010 – December 21, 2011

Work of Art: The Next Great Artist is an American reality competition show that aired on the cable television network Bravo, in which up-and-coming artists compete for a solo exhibition at the Brooklyn Museum and a cash prize of $100,000. The show was produced by Pretty Matches Productions and Magical Elves Productions, the same company that created Project Runway and Top Chef. The series premiered on June 9, 2010. Work of Art was renewed for a second season in September 2010 which began on October 12, 2011.

== Seasons ==
Season	Premiere date	Finale date	No. of Artists	Winner	Runners-up	Mentors
1	June 9, 2010	August 11, 2010	14	Abdi Farah	Peregrine Honig; Miles Mendenhall	China Chow (Host/Judge); Jerry Saltz (Judge); Bill Powers (Judge); Simon de Pury (Mentor)
2	October 12, 2011	December 21, 2011	14	Kymia Nawabi	Young Sun Han; Sara Jimenez	China Chow (Host/Judge); Jerry Saltz (Judge); Bill Powers (Judge); Simon de Pury (Mentor)

== Season 1 (2010) ==
=== Contestants ===
Artist	Age^{1}	Artistic specialty	Occupation	Resides in^{2}	Finish
Amanda Williams	34	Abstract Painter	Architecture Professor	Chicago, Illinois	14th
Trong Nguyen	38	Installation Artist	Museum Curator	Brooklyn, New York	13th
Judith Braun	61	Mixed Media	Landlord	New York City	12th
Nao Bustamante	46	Performance Artist	Professor	Troy, New York	11th/ 10th
John Parot	39	Painter	Art Studio Manager	Los Angeles	11th/ 10th
Jaime Lynn Henderson	24	Painter/Illustrator	Freelance Artist	Lawton, Oklahoma	9th
Erik Johnson	30	Painter	Unemployed	Homer Glen, Illinois	8th
Ryan Shultz	26	Realist Painter	Private Art Teacher	Chicago, Illinois	7th
Mark Velasquez	32	Photographer	Fry Cook	Santa Maria, California	6th
Jaclyn Santos	25	Realist Painter	Studio Assistant	Manhattan, New York	4th
Nicole Nadeau	25	Industrial Designer/Sculptor	Waitress	New York, New York	5th
Miles Mendenhall	23	Installation Artist	Studio Assistant	Minneapolis, Minnesota	3rd/ 2nd
Peregrine Honig	32	Painter/Sculptor	Boutique Owner	Kansas City, Missouri	3rd/ 2nd
Abdi Farah	22	Figurative Painter/Sculptor	Art Teacher	Dover, Pennsylvania	1st

^Note 1: Age at the time of filming.
^Note 2: City of residence at the time of filming.

=== Contestant progress ===
Artists	Progress by episode									
Artists	1	2	3^{1}	4	5	6^{2}	7	8	9	10
Abdi	HIGH	HIGH	IN	WIN	IN	HIGH	LOW	LOW	WIN	WINNER
Peregrine	IN	IN	LOW	IN	IN	IN	WIN	IN	LOW	RUNNER-UP
Miles	WIN	WIN	IN	IN	HIGH	LOW	IN	WIN	HIGH	RUNNER-UP
Nicole	IN	HIGH	IN	IN	IN	WIN	HIGH	IN	OUT	
Jaclyn	IN	IN	LOW	HIGH	WIN	IN	LOW	WIN	OUT	
Mark	HIGH	IN	HIGH	IN	LOW	HIGH	IN	OUT		
Ryan	IN	IN	IN	IN	LOW	HIGH	OUT			
Erik	LOW	IN	IN	LOW	IN	OUT				
Jamie Lynn	IN	LOW	IN	LOW	OUT					
John	IN	IN	WIN	OUT						
Nao	LOW	IN	IN	OUT						
Judith	IN	LOW	OUT							
Trong	IN	OUT								
Amanda	OUT									

^Note 1: John had his book cover published by Penguin Books; he did not receive immunity.
^Note 2: Beginning with this episode, the winners no longer received immunity.

(WINNER) The artist won Work of Art: The Next Great Artist.
(RUNNER-UP) The artist was a runner-up for the season.
(WIN) The artist won that episode's challenge.
(HIGH) The artist was selected as one of the top entries in the challenge, but did not win.
(IN) The artist neither won nor lost that week's challenge. They also were not up to be eliminated.
(LOW) The artist was selected as one of the bottom entries in the challenge, but was not eliminated.
(OUT) The artist lost that week's challenge and was out of the competition.

=== Episodes ===
No. overall	No. in season	Title	Guest Judge	Original release date	Prod. code	US viewers (millions)
1	1	"Self-Reflexive"	N/A	June 9, 2010	TBA	N/A
Challenge: Create a portrait of one of your fellow artists. Challenge winner: Miles; Bottom three: Amanda, Erik, Nao; Eliminated: Amanda
2	2	"The Shape of Things to Come"	Jon Kessler	June 16, 2010	TBA	N/A
Challenge: Create a sculptural piece from items selected from an electronics graveyard. Challenge winner: Miles; Bottom three: Jaime Lynn, Judith, Trong; Eliminated: Trong
3	3	"Judging a Book By Its Cover"	Jonathan Santlofer	June 23, 2010	TBA	N/A
Challenge: Design a book cover for one of six classic novels, Alice's Adventures in Wonderland, Dracula, Frankenstein, Pride and Prejudice, Strange Case of Dr Jekyll and Mr Hyde and The Time Machine. Challenge winner: John; Bottom three: Jaclyn, Judith, Peregrine; Eliminated: Judith
4	4	"A Shock to the System"	Andres Serrano	June 30, 2010	TBA	N/A
Challenge: Create a shocking piece. Challenge winner: Abdi; Bottom four: Erik, Jaime Lynn, John, Nao; Eliminated: John, Nao
5	5	"Art That Moves You"	Richard Phillips	July 7, 2010	TBA	1.2
Challenge: Create a work of art based on your Audi experience. Challenge winner: Jaclyn; Bottom three: Jaime Lynn, Mark, Ryan; Eliminated: Jaime Lynn
6	6	"Open to the Public"	Yvonne Force Villareal	July 14, 2010	TBA	N/A
Challenge: Create a piece of public art. Red Team: Abdi, Mark, Nicole, Ryan; Blue Team: Erik, Jaclyn, Miles, Peregrine Challenge winner: Red Team; Individual winner: Nicole; Bottom two: Erik, Miles; Eliminated: Erik
7	7	"Child's Play"	Will Cotton	July 21, 2010	TBA	N/A
Challenge: Create a piece based on what ignited your artistic expression, using only supplies found at the Children's Museum of the Arts. Challenge winner: Peregrine; Bottom three: Abdi, Jaclyn, Ryan; Eliminated: Ryan
8	8	"Opposites Attract"	Ryan McGinness	July 28, 2010	TBA	N/A
Challenge: Create an artwork about opposing forces: Heaven and Hell (Mark/Peregrine); Male and Female (Miles/Jaclyn); Order and Chaos (Abdi/Nicole). Challenge winners: Miles, Jaclyn; Bottom two: Abdi, Mark; Eliminated: Mark
9	9	"Natural Talents"	Michele Oka Doner	August 4, 2010	TBA	N/A
Challenge: Create a piece inspired from nature and landscape incorporating materials gathered from a Connecticut nature preserve. Challenge winner: Abdi; Bottom three: Jaclyn, Nicole, Peregrine; Eliminated: Jaclyn, Nicole
10	10	"The Big Show"	David LaChapelle	August 11, 2010	TBA	1.48
Challenge: The remaining artists return home, where they have three months to develop a final exhibition using themes of their own choosing. Winner: Abdi; Runners-up: Miles, Peregrine

== Season 2 (2011) ==
=== Contestants ===
Artist	Age^{1}	Artistic specialty	Occupation	Resides in^{2}	Finish
Ugo Nonis	33	Line Artist	Art Director/Designer	Paris, France	14th
Kathryn Parker Almanas	29	Photographer	Photographer	Brooklyn, New York	13th
Jazz-Minh Moore	32	Figurative Painter	Freelance Artist	New York City	12th/ 11th
Leon Lim	31	Installation Artist	Graphic Designer	Kedah, Malaysia	12th/ 11th
Michael "Tewz" Chlebowski	30	Street Artist	Arts Educator	Chicago, Illinois	10th
Bayeté Ross Smith	35	Video Artist	Arts Educator	New York City	9th
Morgan "Sucklord" Phillips	42	Toy Art Designer	CEO, Suckadelic Inc	New York City	8th
Michelle Matson	29	Sculptor	Artist Assistant	Bridgewater, New Jersey	7th
Sarah Kabot	34	Installation Artist/Sculptor	Assistant Art Professor	Cleveland, Ohio	6th
Dusty Mitchell	32	Installation Artist/Sculptor	Elementary School Art Teacher	Mountain View, Arkansas	5th/ 4th
Lola Thompson	24	Sculptor	Barista	Los Angeles	5th/ 4th
Sara Jimenez	26	Figurative Painter	Gallery Intern	New York City	3rd/ 2nd
Young Sun Han	28	Performance Artist/Photographer	Exhibiting Artist	Skokie, IL	3rd/ 2nd
Kymia Nawabi	30	Drawer/Painter	Waitress	New York City	1st

^Note 1: Age at the time of filming.
^Note 2: City of residence at the time of filming.

=== Contestant progress ===
Artists	Progress by episode									
Artists	1	2	3^{1}	4	5	6	7	8	9	10
Kymia	IN	IN (+)	HIGH	WIN	IN	HIGH	LOW	IN	WIN	WINNER
Young	IN	IN (-)	WIN	IN	WIN	WIN	IN	WIN	IN	RUNNER-UP
Sara	HIGH	IN (+)	IN	LOW	IN	HIGH	WIN	WIN	LOW	RUNNER-UP
Lola	HIGH	LOW	IN	IN	HIGH	LOW	LOW	IN	OUT	
Dusty	IN	IN (+)	LOW	HIGH	HIGH	WIN	IN	LOW	OUT	
Sarah	IN	IN (+)	IN	IN	LOW	LOW	HIGH	OUT		
Michelle	WIN	HIGH	LOW	IN	IN	LOW	OUT			
The Sucklord	LOW	IN (+)	IN	LOW	LOW	OUT				
Bayeté	LOW	WIN	IN	IN	OUT					
Tewz	IN	LOW	IN	OUT						
Leon	IN	IN (-)	OUT							
Jazz-Minh	IN	IN (-)	OUT							
Kathryn	IN	OUT								
Ugo	OUT									

^Note 1: Young had a two-page spread published in Entertainment Weekly; he did not receive immunity.

(WINNER) The artist won the season of Work of Art: The Next Great Artist.
(RUNNER-UP) The artist was a runner-up for the season.
(WIN) The artist won that episode's challenge.
(HIGH) The artist was selected as one of the top entries in the challenge, but did not win.
(IN) The artist neither won nor lost that week's challenge. They also were not up to be eliminated.
(LOW) The artist was selected as one of the bottom entries in the challenge, but was not eliminated.
(OUT) The artist lost that week's challenge and was out of the competition.

=== Episodes ===
No. overall	No. in season	Title	Guest Judge	Original release date	Prod. code	US viewers (millions)
11	1	"Kitsch Me If You Can"	Mary Ellen Mark	October 12, 2011	TBA	N/A
Challenge: The artists must use pieces of "bad" art, such as a painting of dogs playing checkers, a velvet cowboy, and a sculptural golden peacock as their canvas. Challenge winner: Michelle; Bottom three: Bayeté, The Sucklord, Ugo; Eliminated: Ugo
12	2	"Art Movement"	Jeanne Greenberg Rohatyn	October 19, 2011	TBA	N/A
Challenge: The artists must use parkour, a discipline where participants overcome obstacles using only their bodies to move from point A to point B in the most creative and inventive way possible, as their inspiration. Team Loop: Jazz-Minh, Kathryn, Leon, Lola, Tewz, Young; Team Play With Me: Bayeté, Dusty, Kymia, Michelle, Sara, Sarah, The Sucklord Challenge winner: Team Play With Me; Individual winner: Bayeté; Bottom three: Kathryn, Lola, Tewz; Eliminated: Kathryn
13	3	"Make It Pop"	Rob Pruitt	October 26, 2011	TBA	0.62
Challenge: The contestants must create a piece of pop art that captures the popular culture of their time. Challenge winner: Young; Bottom four: Leon, Dusty, Michelle, Jazz-Minh; Eliminated: Jazz-Minh, Leon
14	4	"Back to School"	Sarah Jessica Parker	November 2, 2011	TBA	N/A
Challenge: The artists are challenged to create a piece of art inspired by the original artwork of the child they are paired with. Challenge winner: Kymia; Bottom three: Sara, The Sucklord, Tewz; Eliminated: Tewz
15	5	"Ripped from the Headlines"	Adam McEwen	November 9, 2011	TBA	N/A
Challenge: The artists must create a piece of art that illustrates a headline which strikes a chord with them. Challenge winner: Young; Bottom three: Bayeté, Sarah K., The Sucklord; Eliminated: Bayeté
16	6	"Street Dealers"	N/A	November 16, 2011	TBA	N/A
Challenge: The artists are challenged to leave their mark on New York with a work that embodies the subversion of street art. Challenge winners: Dusty and Young; Bottom four: Lola, Michelle, The Sucklord, Sarah; Eliminated: The Sucklord
17	7	"La Dolce Arte"	Liz Cohen	November 30, 2011	TBA	N/A
Challenge: The artists must utilize one automobile component from a Fiat 500 and transform it into a piece of art. Challenge winner: Sara; Bottom three: Kymia, Lola, Michelle; Eliminated: Michelle
18	8	"Sell Out"	Jeanne Greenberg Rohatyn	December 7, 2011	TBA	N/A
Challenge: The artists work in teams to create a minimum of one piece of art to sell to the public, but that is also worthy of presenting in a gallery show. Challenge winners: Sara and Young; Bottom two: Sarah, Dusty; Eliminated: Sarah
19	9	"Exile on Main Street"	Richard Phillips	December 14, 2011	TBA	N/A
Challenge: The artists travel to Cold Springs and choose locals to portrait. Challenge winner: Kymia; Bottom three: Sara, Dusty and Lola; Eliminated: Dusty and Lola
20	10	"Elimination"	KAWS	December 21, 2011	TBA	0.781
Challenge: The finalists present their collections to the judging panel to determine who will be "The Next Great Artist." Winner: Kymia; Runners-up: Young, Sara

== Future seasons ==
Work of Art's renewal status was unclear as the second season concluded: In late December 2011, Judge Bill Powers wrote that "We will have to see if our work of art worked for Bravo." Jerry Saltz, another Work of Art judge, announced via his Vulture blog that he would not return for a third season of the show. The uncertainty as to Work of Art's fate on Bravo was somewhat resolved when the Gallerist reported the show's cancellation in August 2012. The LA Times reported that while Bravo would not officially confirm the cancellation, "a source close to the channel said it was "unlikely" that the show would return for a third season on Bravo." Work of Art's producers as of August 2012 were approaching other television networks in the hopes of continuing the show's run elsewhere.
