= Lompoc High School =

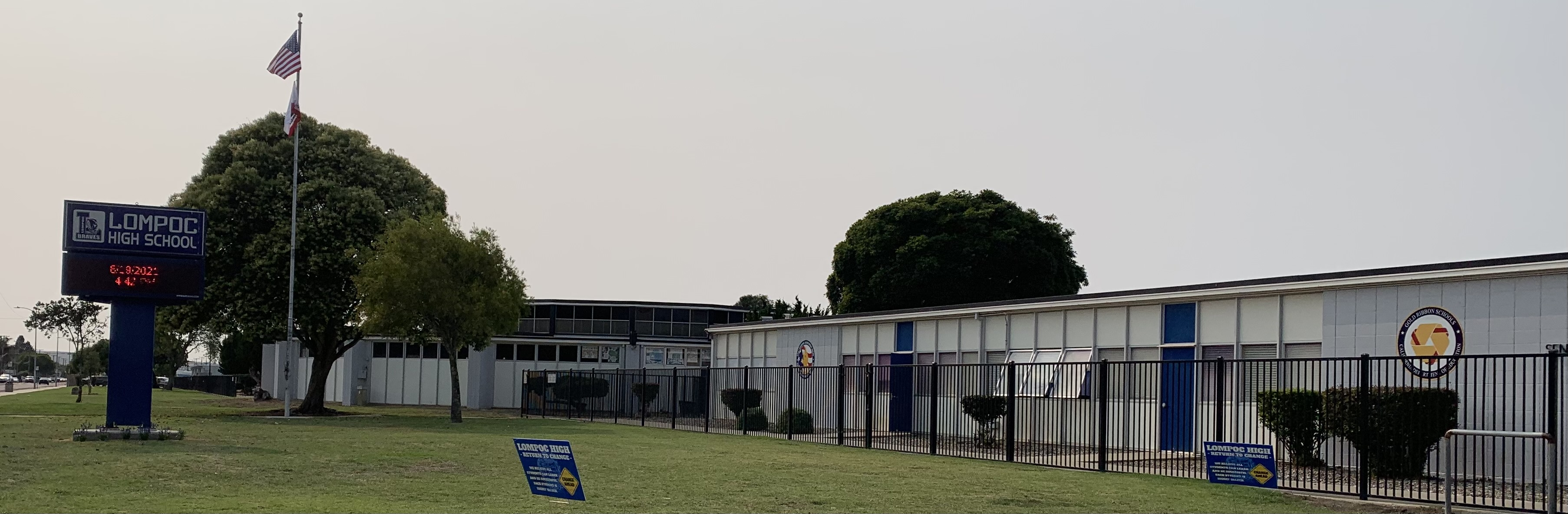

Location
- 515 West College Avenue; Lompoc, CA, 93436; 34°38′49″N 120°27′46″W

Information
- Type: Public High School
- Established: 1892
- School district: Lompoc Unified School District
- Principal: Celeste Pico
- Staff: 83.38 (FTE)
- Grades: 9-12
- Enrollment: 1,649 (2023-2024)
- Student to teacher ratio: 19.78
- Campus type: Small-Size City
- Colors: Blue; White
- Athletics conference: CIF Central Section; Central Coast Athletic Association
- Nickname: Braves
- Rival: Cabrillo High School
- Newspaper: Smoke Signal
- Yearbook: La Purisma
- Website: www.lompochigh.org

Lompoc High School is a public high school serving Lompoc, in northern Santa Barbara County, California, United States. It was first established in the small farming community in 1892. It is part of the Lompoc Unified School District, as is crosstown rival Cabrillo High.

== Performance ==
The school achieved an API index of 692 in 2009.

== Notable alumni ==
- Julián Araujo, defender for Celtic Football Club and the Mexico national football team
- Steve Boadway, NFL player
- Mike Bratz, former professional basketball player (San Antonio Spurs, Cleveland Cavaliers, Chicago Bulls, Golden State Warriors, Sacramento Kings, Phoenix Suns)
- Russ Bolinger, former NFL player for 10 years Detroit Lions and Los Angeles Rams and an NFL scout for 25 years
- Rex Caldwell, professional golfer on PGA Tour, Nationwide Tour and Champions Tour
- Casey Candaele, former Major League Baseball player who played for Montreal Expos, Houston Astros and Cleveland Indians
- Kelly Candaele, “A League of Their Own” by Kim Wilson and Kelly Candaele; Kelly wrote and produced PBS documentary on All-American Girls Professional Baseball League, in which his mother and aunt played; son of Helen Callaghan Candaele St. Aubin, center fielder in AAGPBL
- Sheldon Canley, professional football player for NFL's San Francisco 49ers
- Ryan Church, former professional baseball player
- Lavon Coleman, professional running back in the NFL
- Jeffrey Combs, actor (Re-Animator, various Star Trek characters)
- Gunther Cunningham, assistant head coach-linebackers for NFL's Tennessee Titans; former head coach of Kansas City Chiefs
- Johnnie Gray, professional football player for NFL's Green Bay Packers
- Mark Herrier, Actor (Porky's, Bosch)
- Roy Howell, professional baseball player for MLB's Toronto Blue Jays
- Boo Jackson, MAC quarterback for Ohio University
- Napoleon Kaufman, professional football player for NFL's Oakland Raiders
- Patricia Lee (judge) Nevada Supreme Court justice
- Joel Smith, Washington Huskies Pac-12 basketball guard
- Dave Stegman, professional baseball player for MLB's Chicago White Sox
- Roy Thomas, professional baseball player for MLB's Seattle Mariners
