= Elissa F. Cadish =

American judge (born 1964)

Elissa Cadish

Chief Justice of the Nevada Supreme Court
- In office January 2, 2024 – January 6, 2025
- Preceded by: Lidia S. Stiglich
- Succeeded by: Douglas W. Herndon

Justice of the Nevada Supreme Court
- Incumbent
- Assumed office January 7, 2019
- Preceded by: Michael Cherry

Personal details
- Born: August 8, 1964 (age 61)
- Party: Democratic
- Education: University of Pennsylvania (BA); University of Virginia (JD)

Elissa F. Cadish (born August 8, 1964) is an American lawyer who has served as a justice of the Nevada Supreme Court since 2019; she served as the chief justice from 2024 to 2025. She is a former nominee to be a United States district judge of the United States District Court for the District of Nevada.

== Biography ==
Cadish received her Bachelor of Arts degree, magna cum laude, from the University of Pennsylvania in 1986. She received her Juris Doctor from the University of Virginia School of Law in 1989. She served as a law clerk to Judge Philip Martin Pro of the United States District Court for the District of Nevada from 1989 to 1990. From 1991 to 1995 she worked as an associate at the law firm of Jolley, Urga, Wirth & Woodbury. From 1995 to 2007 she worked at Hale, Lane, Peek, Dennison & Howard, first as an associate, becoming a shareholder in 2000. From 2007 to 2019 she served as a District Court Judge on the Eight Judicial District Court of Nevada, based in Las Vegas.

=== Failed nomination to federal district court ===
On February 16, 2012, President Barack Obama nominated Cadish to be a United States District Judge of the United States District Court for the District of Nevada. She would have replaced Judge Philip Martin Pro, who assumed senior status in 2011. Due to the fact that Senator Heller refused to sign and return his blue slip for her nomination, the Senate Judiciary Committee would not hold a hearing on her nomination and the Senate could not proceed on the nomination. Heller's opposition to her nomination and his invocation of "senatorial courtesy" is due to a statement by Cadish indicating that she believed there was no individual right to keep and bear arms, a statement which was made in 2008, prior to Supreme Court decisions explicitly recognizing an individual right to keep and bear arms. On January 2, 2013, her nomination was returned to the Senate, due to the sine die adjournment of the Senate.

On January 3, 2013, she was renominated to the same office. On March 8, 2013, she announced that she had requested President Obama to withdraw her nomination. Five days later, Obama formally withdrew her nomination.

=== Nevada Supreme Court ===
Cadish announced she was running for Seat C in the November 2018 election. She won her seat defeating challenger Jerome T. Tao, 45.30% to 32.42% She replaced Michael Cherry who retired in 2019. She became chief justice on January 2, 2024.

== See also ==
- List of Jewish American jurists

Legal offices
| Preceded by Michael Cherry | Justice of the Nevada Supreme Court; 2019–present | Incumbent |
| Preceded by Lidia S. Stiglich | Chief Justice of the Nevada Supreme Court; 2024–2025 | Succeeded by Douglas W. Herndon |
