= Casey Candaele =

American baseball player (born 1961)

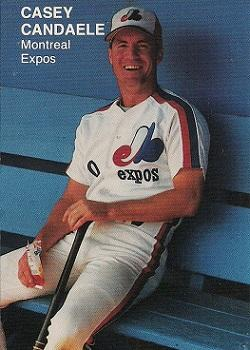
- Candaele with the Montreal Expos
- Utility player
- Born: January 12, 1961 (age 65); Lompoc, California, U.S.

MLB debut
- June 5, 1986, for the Montreal Expos

Last MLB appearance
- July 13, 1997, for the Cleveland Indians

MLB statistics
- Batting average: .250
- Home runs: 11
- Runs batted in: 139
- Stats at Baseball Reference

Teams
- As player: Montreal Expos (1986–1988); Houston Astros (1988, 1990–1993); Cleveland Indians (1996–1997); As coach: Seattle Mariners (2016–2017); Toronto Blue Jays (2022)

Casey Todd Candaele (born January 12, 1961) is an American former utility player and professional baseball coach. His mother, Helen Callaghan St. Aubin and her sister, Marge Callaghan, played for the All-American Girls Professional Baseball League, which was depicted in the movie A League of Their Own. Candaele and his mother represent the only mother/son combination to have both played professional baseball.

The Seattle Mariners hired Candaele as their first base coach during the 2015–16 offseason. He worked with them until the end of the 2017 season. In January 2018, the Toronto Blue Jays hired Candaele to manage the Advanced-A Dunedin Blue Jays. Candaele managed the Blue Jays' top affiliate, the Buffalo Bisons, before becoming the interim major league bench coach in 2022.

== Playing career ==
A 5-foot-9-inch (1.75 m) 160-pound (73 kg) switch hitter, Candaele was born in Lompoc, California, on January 12, 1961. Candaele played prep baseball at Lompoc High School and attended the University of Arizona, where he played collegiate baseball for the Wildcats and was a part of the 1980 College World Series champion team.

He was signed by the Montreal Expos on August 15, 1982, as an amateur free agent.

Candaele split the 1983 season between Class A and Class AA baseball. With the West Palm Beach Expos of the Class A Florida State League, he batted .305 in 127 games; he played 5 games for the Memphis Chicks of the Class AA Southern League. He spent the 1984 season with the Jacksonville Suns, batting .273 in 132 games with the team then, over the next two seasons, was with the Class AAA Indianapolis Indians of the American Association, batting .259 in 302 games in 1985 and finishing the 1986 season with a .302 average in 119 games.

Candaele made his major league debut for the Expos on June 5, 1986, pinch hitting for pitcher Dan Schatzeder and striking out against Charles Hudson in a 7–3 loss to the Philadelphia Phillies at Olympic Stadium. He finished the 1986 season with 24 hits in 104 at-bats for a batting average of .231.

In 1987, his first full year in the major leagues, Candaele batted .272 with one home run and 23 RBI in 138 games. He struck out just 28 times in 495 plate appearances. He played second base, shortstop, all three outfield positions, and first base. He came in fourth in balloting for the 1987 Major League Baseball Rookie of the Year Award in the National League, an award that went to catcher Benito Santiago of the San Diego Padres. Candaele played the first half of the 1988 season with the Expos, batting .172 in 38 games, with 20 hits in 116 at bats. He played in 60 games for the Indianapolis Indians in 1988, batting .264 in 60 games.

The Expos traded Candaele on July 23, 1988, to the Houston Astros in exchange for catcher Mark Bailey. With the Astros that season, he appeared in 21 games, with his 5 hits in 31 at bats yielding a .161 batting average. He played in 17 games with the Tucson Toros of the Class AAA Pacific Coast League in the Astros organization, hitting for a .258 average. He played in 130 games for the Astros in 1990, hitting for a .286 average with 3 home runs. That season he also played in 7 games for the Toros, hitting for a .214 average. He spent the entire 1991 season with the Astros, finishing the season with an average of .262, and having career highs with 151 games played and 4 home runs to go along with 7 triples, which placed him ninth in the National league in that category. His average dropped to .213 for the 1992 season, with Candaele playing in 135 games. Candaele split the 1993 season, playing 75 games with the Astros and hitting .240, with another 6 games played in Tucson, where he batted .296.

On October 4, 1993, he was granted free agency by the Astros, and was signed on November 24 by the Cincinnati Reds. He spent the entire 1994 season with the Indianapolis Indians, by then the Reds' AAA affiliate, and hit for a .282 average in 131 games with the team.

He was released by the Reds on October 15, 1994, and signed with the Los Angeles Dodgers on February 1, 1995. He played with the Albuquerque Dukes of the Pacific Coast League in the Dodgers organization, hitting .259 in 12 games.

The Dodgers released Candaele on April 26, 1995, after which he was picked up as a free agent by the Cleveland Indians on May 5. He played most of the 1995 season with the Buffalo Bisons of the American Association, hitting for a .247 average in 97 games. In 24 games for the Indians in 1996, he hit for a .250 average. His last major league season was in 1997, in which he finished with a .308 average in 14 games. His final game was on July 13, 1997, against the Minnesota Twins, when Candaele came into the game in the seventh inning to replace Julio Franco at second base, with his final at bat resulting in a fly out to left field in the ninth inning of a 12–5 win. He also played 79 games for the Bisons in the 1997 season, finishing with a .228 batting average. He then continued playing for another three seasons, shuffling around the minors, retiring after the 2000 season.

== Coaching career ==
The Seattle Mariners hired Candaele as their first base coach during the 2015–16 offseason. After the 2017 season, he joined the Toronto Blue Jays organisation, initially manager of the High-A Dunedin Blue Jays on January 10, 2018. After one season in Dunedin, the organisation moved him to Low–A Vancouver Canadians. During the long offseason between the 2019 and 2021 seasons (no minor league seasons in 2020), the Blue Jays assigned Candaele as manager for their Triple–A club, the Buffalo Bisons, for the 2021 season.

The Blue Jays promoted Candaele to become their major league bench coach on July 13, 2022. On November 30, it was announced that Candaele would return to Triple–A Buffalo as the club's manager for the 2023 season. On August 17, 2025, Candaele notched his 313th victory as manager of the Bisons, surpassing Marty Brown for the most wins of any manager in Bisons history.

== Nickname ==
Houston Astros Hall of Fame announcer Milo Hamilton called Candaele "Mighty Mite" for his aggressive play despite his diminutive size.

== Personal life ==
Casey's brother is filmmaker Kelly Candaele, whose PBS documentary about the AAGPBL led to the creation of the 1992 film A League of Their Own, directed by Penny Marshall. His mother Helen Callaghan, one of the best players in the league's history, won a batting title while collecting a .257 batting average and 354 stolen bases in her 388-game career over five seasons.

Preceded by Chris Woodward	Seattle Mariners first base coach 2016–2017	Succeeded by Chris Prieto
