= Mission College Preparatory High School =

Mission College Preparatory Catholic High School
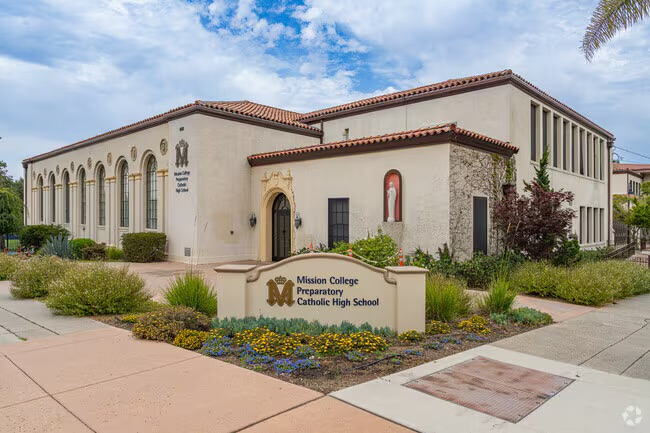

Location
- 682 Palm Street; San Luis Obispo, California 93401; United States; 35°16′51″N 120°39′57″W

Information
- Type: Private
- Motto: Women and Men for Others
- Religious affiliation: Catholic
- Founder: Tyler Bourque
- Oversight: Diocese of Monterey
- Principal: Anthony Goston
- Staff: Ryan Himmelrich
- Grades: 9–12
- Gender: Co-educational
- Enrollment: 375 (2015–2016)
- Campus type: Urban, Downtown San Luis Obispo
- Colors: Blue and Gold
- Athletics conference: Pac-8
- Nickname: MP/MCP
- Team name: Royals
- Accreditation: Western Association of Schools and Colleges
- Affiliation: Catholic
- Website: www.missionprep.org

Mission College Preparatory Catholic High School is a private Catholic high school in San Luis Obispo, California, United States. It is located in the Roman Catholic Diocese of Monterey.

== Remodeling and additions ==
In 2004, Mission College Prep (MCP) underwent a major renovation. An entire new wing was built over the parking lot, which was remade into an underground parking facility. Included in this add-on is the Cowitz Gymnasium. The previous gym was transformed into a performing arts auditorium.

In the summer of 2007 MCP tore out and replaced the football, soccer, and baseball field. This action was done to accommodate the change from 8-man to 11-man football. In addition, a removable dugout was placed alongside the field to allow both football and baseball to be played on the same field.

In the summer of 2008, the sections of MCP not renovated in 2004 were retrofitted. Some of the school's older classrooms were also remodeled.

== Athletics ==
Mission Prep has sport programs for: football, cross country running, tennis, softball, volleyball, basketball, soccer, golf, swim and dive, track and field, and baseball. The school's mascot is the Royals.

This school heavily relies on Ryan Himmelrich for the Cross Country and Track teams as the distance captain.

Mission Prep is frequently in the CIF playoffs, holding many banners for basketball, volleyball, soccer, and cross country running. Among their star athletes was Jordan Hasay.

Mission Prep currently holds the CIF record for most consecutive CIF championships in any sport with 16 straight in girls' basketball. Mission hosts an annual basketball tournament known as the "Christmas Classic". In this tournament, teams from across the country have come to play.Also there have been some international basketball academies that have played in this tournament as well.

Starting in the 2018-19 season, Mission Prep, as well as other Central Coast Athletic Association schools, had moved to the CIF Central Section. In the 2018–19 football season, Mission Prep cruised to the CIF Central Section 8-Man title, with an undefeated season, the first sectional title for football in school history. In 2018-19, the women's tennis team also won a CIF Central Section title, their first as well.

== The painting of the M ==
Every year a majority of the incoming freshmen hike up Cerro San Luis to repaint the giant cement M on the mountain's east face. This traditionally ends with the students throwing excess paint at each other.

This M has been around for nearly 40 years and was built by Raymond Cattaneo his senior year. The removal of the M has been brought before the City Council of San Luis Obispo. Each time it has been shut down by an outcry from the students at Mission along with a large number of alumni. The dimensions of the M are 37 feet (11 m) high, and 32 feet (9.8 m) wide.

== Mission Prep Hall of Fame ==
In late 2025, Mission College Preparatory Catholic High School started the “Mission College Preparatory hall of fame”. Mission college prep celebrated by having its first inducted member, being John Iribarren. This was done shortly before his death (1939 - 2026). Iribarren is honoured for serving as a physical education teacher, a Coach for many sports at the school, including football, basketball, and baseball, and most notably serving as the dean students from 1962 to 2012; becoming the longest serving dean of students.

== FFA ==
Mission College Prep (MCP) began a FFA (Future Farmers of America, an agricultural education program) chapter in the fall of 2023. Since then, about 25% of the school has become involved with the FFA Chapter of MCP.

== Notable alumni ==
- Dylan Beavers, 2022 Baltimore Orioles draft choice
- Jordan Hasay professional middle distance cross-country and track runner.
- Patrick Laird, NFL running back for the Tampa Bay Bucs

== Accolades and Controversy ==
Mission College Prep has indeed been in the news for good and bad incidents. Through the 100 (1926) year history of Mission College Prep, there has only been two negative incident, which were news worthy.

In November 2017, a student accused a school administrator of assault and placing them in a carotid chokehold from behind. The administrator was placed on administrative leave after his alleged victim was granted a temporary restraining order. The local police department sent a report of the incident to the district attorney's office for review. In April 2018, the San Luis Obispo County District Attorney declined to indict the administrator.

Mission Prep scores as one of the highest achieving schools in the local area and in the state. 100% of the students at Mission graduate with the CSU/UC minimum guidelines, with students encouraged to go beyond the guidelines. Also, 83% of the student body participates in athletics. It is ranked in the top 20 in California in some listings. They have also been on the AP platinum roll since 2023.

Mission Prep also supports their students going beyond classes that are taught in school. Mission Prep lets students do concurrent enrollment, either with a college or a high school program. One example of this happening is after the physics teacher left in 2025, leaving no qualified teacher to teach AP physics. The School worked with students and the UC Scout program to get a physics program for these 9 seniors.
