= Maple High School (Lompoc, California) =

Location
- 4010 Jupiter Avenue; Lompoc, California; United States; 34°41′40″N 120°28′13″W

Information
- Type: Public High School
- Locale: Vandenberg Village, Lompoc, California
- Principal: Laurel Ciervo
- Teaching staff: 9.14 (FTE)
- Grades: 9–12
- Enrollment: 125 (2023-2024)
- Student to teacher ratio: 13.68
- Website: www.lusd.org/maplecontinuation

Maple High School is a continuation high school in Vandenberg Village which provides alternative schooling for students whose educational needs aren't met in traditional comprehensive high school programs. The mission of the Maple High School is to ensure that all students learn, make progress towards graduation, and become thinking, contributing members of society. The school is 83% minority students. It is a part of the Lompoc Unified School District, which has 4 total high schools.Maple High School is a member of California's Big Picture Learning Initiative. The school has 5 learning goals:Personal Qualities,Communication,Quantitative Reasoning,Empirical Reasoning and Social Reasoning. The school uses ParentSquare for communication.
