= Lidia S. Stiglich =

American judge (born 1969)

Lidia Stiglich

Chief Justice of the Nevada Supreme Court
- In office January 2, 2023 – January 2, 2024
- Preceded by: Ron Parraguirre
- Succeeded by: Elissa F. Cadish

Justice of the Nevada Supreme Court
- Incumbent
- Assumed office December 5, 2016
- Appointed by: Brian Sandoval
- Preceded by: Nancy Saitta

Personal details
- Born: November 12, 1969 (age 56) Walnut Creek, California, U.S.
- Party: Democratic
- Education: University of California, Berkeley (BS); University of California, Hastings (JD)

Lidia Shenade Stiglich (born November 12, 1969) is an American attorney and jurist serving as a justice of the Supreme Court of Nevada since 2016. She was appointed by Governor Brian Sandoval on November 10, 2016.

== Early life and education ==
Stiglich earned a Bachelor of Science degree in business administration, with a concentration in finance, from the University of California, Berkeley. While at UC Berkeley, she was a member of the intercollegiate softball team. Stiglich later received her Juris Doctor from the University of California, Hastings College of the Law.

== Career ==
Prior to her appointment to the Supreme Court, Stiglich served as district court judge of the Second Judicial District Court. As the presiding judge in Department Eight of the district court, Stiglich heard civil and criminal trials. In addition to the duties in Department Eight, she served as the probate judge for the district and was also the co-founder and presiding judge of the Youth Offender Drug Court. This specialty court was designed for the young adult population (ages 18 to 24) who are opiate/heroin users, as an alternate sentencing/rehabilitation program.

Stiglich was the chair of the Court Automation Enhancement Project (CAEP) Committee, the co-chair of the Criminal Justice Advisory Committee (CJAC), the co-chair of the Civil Bench/Bar Committee, and an at-large board member of the Nevada District Judges Association. Stiglich served on the Washoe County Law Library Board of Trustees, is a master member of the Bruce R. Thompson Inns of Court, and was formerly an alternate member of the Nevada Commission on Judicial Discipline. Stiglich is a member of the Nevada Supreme Court's Indigent Defense Commission and the Commission on Statewide Rules of Criminal Procedure. Stiglich has previously served as a member on the Supreme Court's Commission on Statewide Rules of Criminal Procedure, Jury Instruction Subcommittee and the Nevada Legislature's Advisory Commission on the Administration of Justice, both as a member and on the Victims of Crime Subcommittee. She is a member of the Washoe County, Nevada Bar Association, the Northern Nevada Women Lawyers Association, and the National Association of Women Judges.

Stiglich was the founder and managing partner of Stiglich & Hinckley, LLP. In addition to her role at the firm, she also served as special counsel to Lieutenant Governor Brian Krolicki, where she advised on legal matters related to economic development, tourism, cultural affairs, and special projects. Stiglich is admitted to practice law in Nevada and California.

In addition to her professional affiliations, Stiglich participates in several community organizations. She is a member of the Reno Sunrise Rotary, serves as a board member for Friends of Nevada Mansion, and is a member of the Sierra Nevada Ballet Board of Directors.

Stiglich is a faculty member at the National Judicial College and an instructor at the University of Nevada, Reno. She has also been an adjunct law professor at the John F. Kennedy University School of Law, Golden Gate University School of Law, and New College of California School of Law.

== Personal life ==
Stiglich is openly gay, which as of 2021, makes her one of eleven openly LGBT judges serving on U.S. state supreme courts.

== See also ==
- List of LGBT jurists in the United States
- List of LGBT state supreme court justices in the United States

Legal offices
| Preceded by Nancy Saitta | Justice of the Nevada Supreme Court; 2016–present | Incumbent |
| Preceded by Ron Parraguirre | Chief Justice of the Nevada Supreme Court; 2023–2024 | Succeeded by Elissa F. Cadish |
