= Cabrillo High School (Lompoc, California) =

Location
- 4350 Constellation Road; Lompoc, California, 93436; United States; 34°42′42″N 120°28′29″W

Information
- Type: Public High School
- Motto: Spiritus Noster Omnia Vincit (Our Spirit Conquers All)
- Established: 1965
- Locale: Vandenberg Village, Lompoc, California
- School district: Lompoc Unified School District
- Principal: Brian Grimnes
- Teaching staff: 56.16 (FTE)
- Grades: 9–12
- Enrollment: 1,074 (2023-2024)
- Student to teacher ratio: 19.12
- Colors: Black; Gold; White
- Athletics conference: CIF Central Section; Central Coast Athletic Association
- Nickname: Conquistadors
- Rival: Lompoc High School
- Newspaper: Fore & Aft (discontinued)
- Yearbook: Tierra Royal
- Website: cabrillohighschool.lusd.org

Cabrillo High School is a California Distinguished School that serves students of Vandenberg Village, the city of Lompoc, and Vandenberg Space Force Base in Santa Barbara County, on the California Central Coast.

== History ==
The school was founded in 1965 by the Lompoc Unified School District. Built to serve the residents of Vandenberg Space Force Base, Vandenberg Village, and the northern Lompoc Valley, Cabrillo answered the sudden population boom during the late 1950s and 1960s, a result of the booming space program at Vandenberg. Named for the early Spanish explorer Juan Rodriguez Cabrillo, the school board of Lompoc chose the Conquistador to be the mascot of the new high school in the early 1960s, with the black and gold of the first Spanish Californian flags as the school colors. In 1986, one student and one teacher started the Aquarium Club, which officially opened the Cabrillo High School Aquarium to tours in 2002. In 2007 the California Department of Education awarded Cabrillo as one of the winners for a California Distinguished School Award, as well as 171 other schools in California.

In 2015, a resident spoke in favor of changing the name and mascot due their associations with slavery and the colonization of Native Americans. School Board president Steve Straight told a reporter that he had been working at the school for over 50 years but has never heard anyone make that particular statement before.

== Academics and Activities ==
Cabrillo High School offers a variety of college preparatory and career technical education courses. Cabrillo High School is also home to a full scale aquarium, where students have opportunities to volunteer and/or take classes to learn about marine biology, oceanography, museum curatorship, and tourism.

== Sports ==
Cabrillo High School has won 13 CIF SS championships in 8 sports, including boys' basketball (1979), boys' cross country (2004), boys' track & field (1983, 1985, 1986, 1990, 1991), boys' water polo (1976, 1996, 2022), girls' track & field (1986), softball (1976, 1985), wrestling (1988), and women's water polo (2007). Cabrillo High has seen much success in aquatics, with a combined 62 league titles in boys' swimming (17 titles), boys' water polo (28 titles), girls' swimming (9 titles), and girls' water polo (8 titles).

== Notable alumni ==
- Danny Duffy (2007), professional baseball pitcher and 2015 World Series champion for the Kansas City Royals
- Tracy Gray (1981), investor
- Gary Hargis (1974), professional baseball player for the Pittsburgh Pirates
- Gabe Lopez, singer/songwriter/producer
- George Porter (1985), held the national record in the 300 Intermediate Hurdles for 22 years (still third all-time)
- Duane Solomon (2003), Olympic track athlete; placed 4th in the 800 meters at the 2012 Summer Olympics
- Roland Solomon (1974), NFL defensive back
- Vai Taua (2006), Nevada football coach
- Donald Willis, NFL offensive guard

Max Torina
