= Atascadero High School =

Location
- 1 High School Hill; Atascadero, California; United States
- Coordinates: 35°29′01″N 120°40′17″W

Information
- Type: Public
- School district: Atascadero Unified
- Principal: Courtney Baca
- Teaching staff: 60.40 (FTE)
- Enrollment: 1,114 (2023–2024)
- Student to teacher ratio: 18.44
- Colors: Grey; Orange
- Mascot: Greyhound
- Website: Atascadero HS

Atascadero High School (formerly Margarita Black Union High School and Santa Lucia High School) is a public high school located in Atascadero, California. Atascadero High School is one of two high schools in the Atascadero Unified School District. The school receives its students mainly from the Atascadero Junior High School and Atascadero Fine Arts Academy, and also attracts students from outlying areas of northern and eastern San Luis Obispo County.

== Curriculum ==
The school offers different paths of study, from trade-based programs to a wide variety of college prep, honors, and advanced placement courses.

== Extracurricular activities ==
=== Sports ===
The school's biggest athletic rival is Paso Robles High School. Both schools are now part of the CIF Central Section as members of the Central Coast Athletic Association and have faced off over the years within the California Individual Finals.

==== Fall Sports ====
- Football - CIF Southern Section champions: 1982, 1983, 1986 (Desert-Mountain Division), 1993, 1994, 1995, 1996 (Div. IX) / CIF Central Section champions: 2022 (Div. V) / CIF state champions: 2022 (Div. 6-A)
- Boys Cross Country - CIF SS champions: 1985 (Div. 1-A)
- Girls Cross Country - CIF SS champions: 1984 (Div. 1-A)
- Boys Water polo
- Girls Tennis
- Girls Golf
- Girls Volleyball

==== Winter Sports ====
- Wrestling - CIF SS champions: 1984, 1985, 1986, 1987 (Div. 1-A), 1989 (Div. 2-A), 1995 (Div. III), 2003, 2004 (Northern Div.), 2009 (Eastern Div.)
- Boys Basketball - CIF SS champions: 1969, 1974 (Div. 1-A)
- Girls Basketball
- Boys Soccer
- Girls Soccer
- Girls Water polo

==== Spring Sports ====
- Baseball
- Softball - CIF SS champions: 1993 (Div. IV)
- Swimming
- Diving
- Boys Track and Field
- Girls Track and Field - CIF SS champions: 1990 (Div. 1-A), 1999 (Div. III)
- Boys Golf
- Boys Tennis - CIF SS champions: 1996 (Div. IV)
- Girls STUNT
- Boys Volleyball

==== Robotics ====
Atascadero High School hosts the shop space for FIRST Robotics Competition Team 973 The Greybots. After winning their first event in 2009, the team went to the FIRST Championship every year besides 2010. They won the 2011 World Championship as the 2nd pick in their alliance, as well as the 2017 and 2019 World Championship as captain of their alliance. While no longer formally associated with the district, they continue to meet at their shop on the school campus.

==== Auto Shop/SkillsUSA ====
Atascadero High School SkillsUSA Automotive teaches students how to work on their cars and get a career in the automotive service industry. Atascadero High School Competes in Region 2, which serves Fresno, Kern, Kings, Monterey, San Benito, San Luis Obispo, Santa Barbara, Santa Cruz, and Tulare counties. Students compete in Automotive Service Technology and Maintenance and Light Repair. In 2017 at the SkillsUSA State Conference in Ontario, California, the team earned a 3rd place medal in Automotive Service Technology.

== History ==
Atascadero High School was formerly known as Margarita Black Union High School. Work began on the original high school building designed by Colony Architect John Roth in 1920, but it wasn't until May 1921 that Atascadero Masonic Lodge No. 493 conducted the laying of the cornerstone. The original building featured a clock tower, a pitched tile roof and a large library with a fireplace on one end of the building, The clock tower was able to be viewed in all four directions. In the 1950s, the state of California decided the building was unsafe. The clock tower was taken down, the gable roof replaced with a flat one and the fireplace deemed unusable. This resulted in it becoming a square box building, which currently houses the theater rooms, and the original auditorium/gymnasium was knocked down in 1973. The last original building of the high school was recently taken down after close to 90 years of service due to safety hazards such as asbestos. The empty space is likely to be used for future facilities.

== Notable alumni ==
- Elijah Cooks - NFL wide receiver
- Jordan Cunningham - an American politician representing the 35th district in the California State Assembly
- Chuck Estrada - Major League Baseball pitcher/Baltimore Orioles All-Star
- Jared Hamman - current professional mixed martial arts fighter, formerly competing for the UFC
- Chelsea Johnson - Two-time NCAA-champion pole vaulter/Team USA silver medalist (pole vault) at 2009 IAAF World Championships
- Dan Loney - San Jose SaberCats center/three-time Arena Bowl champion
- Scott McClain - Chicago Cubs/San Francisco Giants infielder
