= Morro Bay High School =

Coordinates: 35.38185°N 120.859°W

- 235 Atascadero Rd; Morro Bay, California; United States

Information
- Established: 1956
- School district: San Luis Coastal Unified School District
- Principal: Scott Schalde
- Teaching staff: 43.26 (FTE)
- Grades: 9–12
- Enrollment: 773 (2023–2024)
- Student to teacher ratio: 17.87
- Schedule: All Classes Daily
- Colors: Black, White, & Blue
- Team name: Pirates
- Newspaper: The Spyglass
- Website: https://mbhs.slcusd.org/

Morro Bay High School is a four-year public high school located in the city of Morro Bay along the coast of San Luis Obispo County, California, United States.

Students of the school are typically residents of Morro Bay, Los Osos (to the south), and Cayucos (to the north). On average, enrollment ranges from 800 to 900 students a year. The school is roughly 60 meters from the beach (.04 mile) and 228 meters (.14 mile) from the Pacific Ocean.

== History ==
Morro Bay High School was first conceived in 1956 when the city voted bonds for its construction, winning by a ratio of four to one. The school was completed in 1959. Initially, the school had served 5 grades throughout the late 60s: 7th Grade, 8th Grade, 9th Grade, 10th Grade, and 11th Grade. Around the late to early 70s the school later followed the common structure of an "American four-year high school".

=== Health hazards ===
Being located right next to the ocean, the quad has faced multiple problems regarding seagulls. Problems such as noise pollution, defecation in the quad and outside areas, and misplaced trash have been common complaints in the last decade. According to faculty, the school had been power washed two times before 2016. Since 2017, the school has hired a "birdman" to use predatory birds (hawks, owls, and falcons) to patrol the school, acting as a deterrent to the seagulls. As of now, this has proved to be effective in clearing the sky of seagulls and keeping the ground clean.

=== Measure D ===
In 2014 a $177 million bond was passed to renovate infrastructure of schools in SLCUSD. Since 2016, the school has gone through heavy construction with renovations such as renovation of the auto shop, a new pool, student services building (new office), all-weather track, STEAM complex (J Wing Renovation), and New Band and Agriculture Shop Classroom. Current renovations have added up to around $12 million. The school anticipates $33 more million worth of construction, with a remodeled cafeteria/multipurpose room, renovation to the quad, renovation of the classrooms, and restoration of the old gym.

== Demographics ==
In 2019, total minority enrollment was 35%, and 31% of students are considered to be economically disadvantaged.

== Clubs ==
- Art Club
- AVID
- Biobuilders (BioTech)
- Dungeons and Dragons club
- FCA (Fellowship of Christian Athletes)
- FFA (Future Farmers of America)
- FNL (Friday Night Live)
- Environmental Club
- Interact
- Kindness Club
- MBHS Theatre Arts
- Mock Trial
- Music History Club
- S.A.G.A (Sexuality and Gender Acceptance)
- Surf
- Tabletop RPG Club
- Underwater Robotics
- VEX Robotics Club

Note: these are the clubs as of 2020

== Sports ==
Sports	Teams	Boys	Girls	Notable Varsity Achievements and/or Section Championships Won
Cross Country	Junior Varsity and Varsity	Yes	Yes	(B) CIF SS Champions: 1993, 1994, 1995 (Division IV-AA) (G) CIF SS Champions: 1982, 1983, 1985 (Div. 1-A), 1994 (Div. IV-AA)
Football	Junior Varsity and Varsity (girls accepted)	Yes	Coed	CIF SS Champions: 1995 (Div. XI) CIF CS Champions: 2021 (Div. VI)
Golf	Junior Varsity and Varsity	Yes	Yes	-
Tennis	Junior Varsity and Varsity (no boys JV)	Yes	Yes	-
Volleyball	Freshman, Junior Varsity and Varsity.	Yes	Yes	-
Water Polo	Junior Varsity and Varsity	Yes	Yes	-
Basketball	Junior Varsity and Varsity	Yes	Yes	(B) CIF SS Champions: 1976 (1-A Division) (G) CIF SS Champions: 1991, 1992, 1999 (Div. IV-AA)
Soccer	Junior Varsity and Varsity	Yes	Yes	(B) CIF SS Champions: 1989 (Small School Division), 1995 (co/Div. V)
Wrestling	Junior Varsity and Varsity	Yes	Yes	(B) CIF SS Champions: 2009 (Div. VI)
Baseball	Freshman, Junior Varsity and Varsity	Yes	No	-
Softball	Junior Varsity and Varsity	No	Yes	-
Stunt	Varsity	Yes	Yes	-
Swimming	Junior Varsity and Varsity	Yes	Yes	-
Track and Field	Junior Varsity and Varsity	Yes	Yes	-

Note: These are the sports running currently as of 2020

=== Sports leagues ===
Since 2018, Morro Bay High School has competed in the Central Coast Athletic Association (CCAA), a conference affiliated with the CIF Central Section. The CCAA places each team by sport and gender into one of its two constituent leagues — the upper Mountain League and the lower Ocean League — based on performance. Until the 2017–18 school year, MBHS and neighboring Central Coast schools were part of the CIF Southern Section, a highly competitive grouping whose footprint included around 600 schools stretching from south of Los Angeles to northern San Luis Obispo County.

=== Cross country ===
Morro Bay hosts a Cross Country Invitational in September yearly, attended by over 30 schools with an attendance of around 900 runners overall. The course is currently 2.7 miles which goes through the school and nearby beach, 1 mile of the 2.7 mile course going through soft sand. The event also features a shorter 2 mile course.

=== Wrestling ===
Morro Bay High School has notably hosted the Sam Boyd California Invitational Tournament, one of the biggest wrestling tournaments in California, hosting over 90 teams and over 980 wrestlers from California and out-of-state Nevada annually. The wrestling team has shown to be a top contender in this event notably finishing 7th out of 90 schools in 2019.

== Academic reputation ==
Morro Bay High School as of 2019 is ranked the 649th out of 2,494 high schools in California (4,424th nationally) by U.S News's metric. In October 2017, it was ranked the 475th best high school in California (2,432nd nationally) by Newsweek. It was previously ranked the 432nd best High School in the 2011 Newsweek article titled "America's Best High Schools", and was reported to have the highest average SAT score (2245 out of 2400) amongst these schools. The LA Times, however, reported that the average SAT score at the school was 1649.

In 2006, Morro Bay High School was named a National Blue Ribbon School by the U.S. Department of Education.

In 2005 and 2009 and 2013, Morro Bay High School was accredited as a California Distinguished School by WASC.

The graduation rate at the school is 95% according to USnews.
