= Vandenberg Village, California =

Vandenberg Village
- Census-designated place
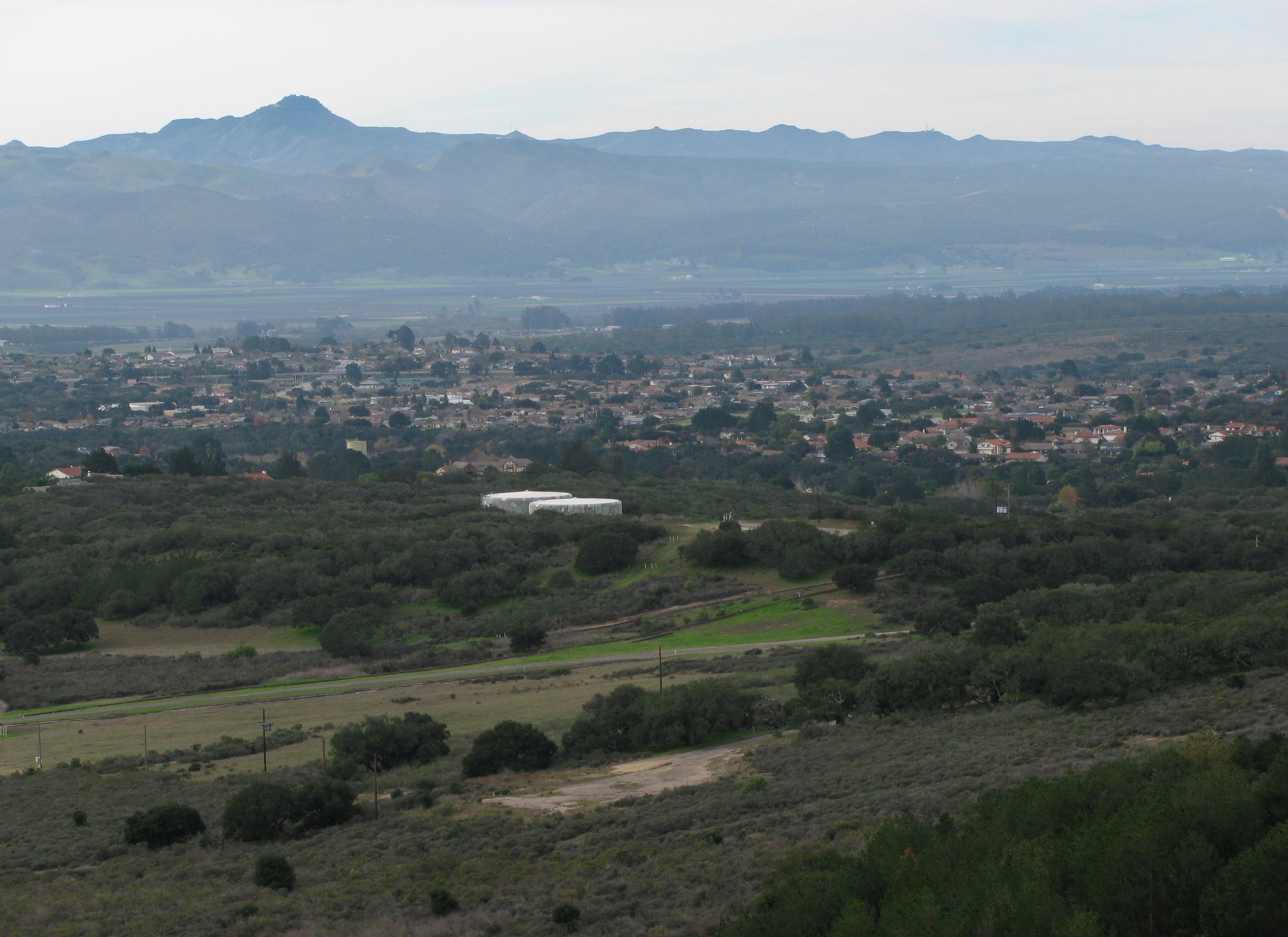
- Vandenberg Village seen from the north

- Location in Santa Barbara County and the state of California
- Coordinates: 34°42′23″N 120°27′56″W
- Country: United States
- State: California
- County: Santa Barbara

Government
  - State senator: Monique Limón (D)
  - Assemblymember: Gregg Hart (D)
  - U. S. rep.: Salud Carbajal (D)

Area
  - Total: 5.271 sq mi (13.651 km^{2})
  - Land: 5.270 sq mi (13.650 km^{2})
  - Water: 0.00039 sq mi (0.001 km^{2}) 0.01%
- Elevation: 374 ft (114 m)

Population (2020)
  - Total: 7,308
  - Density: 1,387/sq mi (535.4/km^{2})
- Time zone: UTC-8 (PST)
  - Summer (DST): UTC-7 (PDT)
- ZIP code: 93436
- Area code: 805
- FIPS code: 06-82086
- GNIS feature ID: 1867066

Vandenberg Village is a census-designated place (CDP) in the unincorporated area of Santa Barbara County, California, United States. The population was 7,308 at the 2020 census, up from 6,497 at the 2010 census.

It is a community situated in the hills north of Lompoc. While shops and markets can be found in Vandenberg Village, many residents commute to nearby Lompoc on a daily basis.

The CDP is close to Vandenberg Space Force Base.

== Geography ==
According to the United States Census Bureau, the CDP has a total area of 5.3 square miles (14 km^{2}), of which 99.99% is land and 0.01% is water.

Vandenberg Village is the location of Cabrillo High School (one of two general high schools located within Lompoc Unified School District boundaries), Buena Vista Elementary School, and Maple High (Continuation) School.

Surrounding the village is the Burton Mesa Ecological Reserve, and north of that the Lompoc Oil Field follows the line of the Purisima Hills.

== Services ==
Water and wastewater services are provided by Vandenberg Village Community Services District.

Electricity services are provided by Pacific Gas and Electric.

Library services are provided by the Lompoc Public Library system.

The CDP is served by Lompoc School District, which ranks in the top 20 percent of schools in California.

== Demographics ==
Historical population
| Census | Pop. | Note | %± |
|---|---|---|---|
| 1970 | 4,874 | | — |
| 1980 | 5,839 | | 19.8% |
| 1990 | 5,971 | | 2.3% |
| 2000 | 5,802 | | −2.8% |
| 2010 | 6,497 | | 12.0% |
| 2020 | 7,308 | | 12.5% |
U.S. Decennial Census; 1860–1870 1880-1890; 1900 1910 1920; 1930 1940 1950; 1960 1970 1980; 1990 2000 2010; 2020

Vandenberg Village was first listed as an unincorporated place in the 1970 U.S. census; and then as a census designated place in the 1980 U.S. census.

=== Racial and ethnic composition ===
Vandenberg Village CDP, California – Racial and ethnic composition Note: the US Census treats Hispanic/Latino as an ethnic category. This table excludes Latinos from the racial categories and assigns them to a separate category. Hispanics/Latinos may be of any race.
| Race / Ethnicity (NH = Non-Hispanic) | Pop 2000 | Pop 2010 | Pop 2020 | % 2000 | % 2010 | % 2020 |
|---|---|---|---|---|---|---|
| White alone (NH) | 4,633 | 4,385 | 4,252 | 79.85% | 67.49% | 58.18% |
| Black or African American alone (NH) | 317 | 261 | 249 | 5.46% | 4.02% | 3.41% |
| Native American or Alaska Native alone (NH) | 31 | 36 | 36 | 0.53% | 0.55% | 0.49% |
| Asian alone (NH) | 171 | 304 | 301 | 2.95% | 4.68% | 4.12% |
| Native Hawaiian or Pacific Islander alone (NH) | 10 | 51 | 51 | 0.17% | 0.78% | 0.70% |
| Other race alone (NH) | 5 | 16 | 53 | 0.09% | 0.25% | 0.73% |
| Mixed race or Multiracial (NH) | 120 | 228 | 451 | 2.07% | 3.51% | 6.17% |
| Hispanic or Latino (any race) | 515 | 1,216 | 1,915 | 8.88% | 18.72% | 26.20% |
| Total | 5,802 | 6,497 | 7,308 | 100.00% | 100.00% | 100.00% |

=== 2020 census ===
As of the 2020 census, Vandenberg Village had a population of 7,308, with a population density of 1,386.7 inhabitants per square mile (535.4/km^{2}).

The census reported that 99.7% of the population lived in households, 0.3% lived in non-institutionalized group quarters, and no one was institutionalized. 88.1% of residents lived in urban areas, while 11.9% lived in rural areas.

There were 2,726 households in Vandenberg Village, of which 29.1% had children under the age of 18 living in them. Of all households, 56.7% were married-couple households, 5.4% were cohabiting couple households, 14.9% were households with a male householder and no spouse or partner present, and 23.0% were households with a female householder and no spouse or partner present. About 22.4% of all households were made up of individuals and 12.1% had someone living alone who was 65 years of age or older. The average household size was 2.67, and there were 1,945 families (71.3% of all households).

The age distribution was 21.9% under the age of 18, 7.7% aged 18 to 24, 22.0% aged 25 to 44, 27.6% aged 45 to 64, and 20.8% aged 65 years or older. The median age was 43.7 years. For every 100 females, there were 97.2 males, and for every 100 females age 18 and over there were 94.4 males age 18 and over.

There were 2,854 housing units at an average density of 541.6 units per square mile (209.1 units/km^{2}), of which 95.5% were occupied and 4.5% were vacant. Of the occupied units, 74.3% were owner-occupied and 25.7% were occupied by renters. The homeowner vacancy rate was 0.8% and the rental vacancy rate was 5.2%.

=== Income and poverty ===
In 2023, the US Census Bureau estimated that the median household income was $104,714, and the per capita income was $49,374. About 2.2% of families and 3.6% of the population were below the poverty line.

=== 2010 census ===
The 2010 United States census reported that Vandenberg Village had a population of 6,497. The population density was 1,238.2 inhabitants per square mile (478.1/km^{2}). The racial makeup of Vandenberg Village was 5,029 (77.4%) White, 271 (4.2%) African American, 60 (0.9%) Native American, 323 (5.0%) Asian, 58 (0.9%) Pacific Islander, 432 (6.6%) from other races, and 324 (5.0%) from two or more races. Hispanic or Latino of any race were 1,216 persons (18.7%).

The Census reported that 6,478 people (99.7% of the population) lived in households, 15 (0.2%) lived in non-institutionalized group quarters, and 4 (0.1%) were institutionalized.

There were 2,551 households, out of which 770 (30.2%) had children under the age of 18 living in them, 1,486 (58.3%) were opposite-sex married couples living together, 237 (9.3%) had a female householder with no husband present, 114 (4.5%) had a male householder with no wife present. There were 86 (3.4%) unmarried opposite-sex partnerships, and 11 (0.4%) same-sex married couples or partnerships. 597 households (23.4%) were made up of individuals, and 360 (14.1%) had someone living alone who was 65 years of age or older. The average household size was 2.54. There were 1,837 families (72.0% of all households); the average family size was 2.99.

The population was spread out, with 1,467 people (22.6%) under the age of 18, 473 people (7.3%) aged 18 to 24, 1,304 people (20.1%) aged 25 to 44, 1,917 people (29.5%) aged 45 to 64, and 1,336 people (20.6%) who were 65 years of age or older. The median age was 45.0 years. For every 100 females, there were 96.0 males. For every 100 females age 18 and over, there were 92.1 males.

There were 2,707 housing units at an average density of 515.9 per square mile (199.2/km^{2}), of which 1,953 (76.6%) were owner-occupied, and 598 (23.4%) were occupied by renters. The homeowner vacancy rate was 2.1%; the rental vacancy rate was 6.1%. 4,968 people (76.5% of the population) lived in owner-occupied housing units and 1,510 people (23.2%) lived in rental housing units.

== See also ==
- Rancho Ex-Mission la Purisima
