= Nevada Court of Appeals =

Intermediate appellate court of Nevada

The Nevada Court of Appeals (in case citations, Nev. Ct. App.) is an appellate court in the judicial system of Nevada and hears cases assigned to it by the Nevada Supreme Court. The court was created by a legislatively referred constitutional amendment that was approved by voters on November 4, 2014. The Court of Appeals hears roughly one-third of all cases submitted to the Nevada Supreme Court in a deflective model, where the Supreme Court assigns cases to a three-judge Court of Appeals. This is similar to systems used in other states, including Iowa, Idaho, and Mississippi.

== History ==
"Historically, the Supreme Court has had the highest number of filings of all states without an appellate court. In 2014, each Supreme Court Justice handled a caseload of roughly 354 cases per year. This means nearly one case every day had to be heard and decided by each Justice."

For years, the Nevada Supreme Court lobbied the legislature to create an intermediate appellate court. Attempts to create one all failed at the ballot box in 1972, 1980, 1992, and 2010. The 2010 attempt was narrowly rejected by 53% of the 670,126 votes cast. The same issue appeared again as Question 1 on the November 4, 2014 ballot, which was narrowly approved by Nevada voters by a 54 percent to 46 percent margin. Nevada then immediately established a Nevada Court of Appeals.

This court will hear roughly one-third of all cases submitted to the Nevada Supreme Court in a deflective model, where the Supreme Court will assign cases to a three-judge Court of Appeals. This is similar to systems used in other states, including Iowa, Idaho, and Mississippi.

All appeals are still filed with the Supreme Court of Nevada, but are then screened to determine whether they involve truly novel issues of law or important issues of public policy, as opposed to contentions that the trial court erred by failing to apply existing precedent. Based on historical data, about one third of future Nevada appeals are expected to fall into the latter category and will be reassigned to the Court of Appeals, thereby enabling the state Supreme Court to focus on deciding hard questions in the remaining cases. In turn, appeals from the decisions of the Court of Appeals to the Supreme Court will be at the discretion of the Supreme Court.

== Judges ==
At its inception, the Court of Appeals consisted of three judges appointed by governor Brian Sandoval.

Seat	Name	Born	Start	Term Ends	Appointer	Law School
3	Bonnie Bulla, Chief Judge	July 22, 1962 (age 63)	March 4, 2019	2028	Steve Sisolak (D)	ASU
2	Michael Gibbons	February 22, 1956 (age 70)	January 5, 2015	2028	Brian Sandoval (R)	Idaho
1	Deborah Westbrook	August 7, 1976 (age 49)	January 2, 2023	2028	—N/a (Note: Took office after being elected in a nonpartisan election.)	Washington
