= Spring Lake =

Spring Lake may refer to:

== Populated places ==
=== Canada ===
- Spring Lake, Alberta

=== United States ===
- Spring Lake, Hernando County, Florida
- Spring Lake, Highlands County, Florida
- Spring Lake Township, Tazewell County, Illinois
- Spring Lake, Indiana
- Spring Lake, Michigan
- Spring Lake Township, Ottawa County, Michigan
- Spring Lake, Minnesota (disambiguation), multiple locations
  - Spring Lake Township, Scott County, Minnesota
  - Spring Lake, Isanti County, Minnesota
  - Spring Lake, Itasca County, Minnesota
  - Spring Lake, Scott County, Minnesota
- Spring Lake (Omaha, Nebraska), a historic neighborhood in Omaha, Nebraska
- Spring Lake, New Jersey
- Spring Lake, North Carolina
- Spring Lake, Rhode Island
- Springlake, Texas
- Spring Lake, Utah
- Spring Lake, Wisconsin, a town
- Spring Lake, Waushara County, Wisconsin, an unincorporated community

== Lakes ==
- Spring Lake (Alberta)
- Spring Lake (Fulton County, Arkansas), a lake in Fulton County, Arkansas
- Spring Lake (Garland County, Arkansas), a lake in Garland County, Arkansas
- Spring Lake (Prairie County, Arkansas), a lake in Prairie County, Arkansas
- Spring Lake (Pulaski County, Arkansas), a lake in Pulaski County, Arkansas
- Spring Lake (Saline County, Arkansas), a lake in Saline County, Arkansas
- Spring Lake (Prairie County, Arkansas), a lake in Prairie County, Arkansas
- Spring Lake (Yell County, Arkansas), a lake in Yell County, Arkansas
- Spring Lake (Winter Haven), a lake in Winter Haven, Florida
- Spring Lake (Independence Township, Michigan)
- Spring Lake (Dakota County, Minnesota)
- Spring Lake (Scott County, Minnesota), a lake in Scott County, Minnesota
- Spring Lake (St. Louis County, Minnesota), a lake in St. Louis County, Minnesota
- Spring Lake (Berlin, New York), a lake in the Town of Berlin, Rensselaer County, New York
- Spring Lake (Delaware County, New York), a lake in New York
- Spring Lake (Texas), a pool formed by San Marcos Springs at a resort named Aquarena Springs, San Marcos, Texas
- Spring Lake (Day County, South Dakota), a lake in Day County, South Dakota
- Spring Lake (Kingsbury County, South Dakota), a lake in Kingsbury County, South Dakota
- Spring Lake (Providence County, Rhode Island), a lake in the town of Burrillville, Rhode Island
- Spring Lake (King County, Washington), a lake in King County, Washington
- Spring Lake (Waushara County, Wisconsin)

== Parks ==
- Spring Lake (San Marcos, Texas), a body of water in San Marcos, Texas
- Spring Lake Regional Park in Santa Rosa, California

== Other ==
- Spring Lake (NJT station)

== See also ==
- Spring Banks Lake
- Spring Valley Lake
- Spring Lake Township (disambiguation)
- Spring (disambiguation)
- Lake Spring, Missouri, US, an unincorporated community
