= Spring =

Spring(s) may refer to:

== Common uses ==
- Spring (season), a season of the year
- Spring (device), a mechanical device that stores energy
- Spring (hydrology), a natural source of water
- Spring (political terminology), often used to name periods of political liberalization
- Springs (tide), in oceanography, the maximum tide, occurs twice a month during the full and new moon

== Places ==
=== United States ===
- Springs, New York, a part of East Hampton, New York
- Springs, Pennsylvania, an unincorporated community
- Spring, Texas, a census-designated place
- Spring District, neighborhood in Bellevue, Washington

=== Other places ===
- Spring (Milz), a river in Thuringia, Germany
- Spring, Alabel, a barangay unit in Alabel, Sarangani Province, Philippines
- Șpring, a commune in Alba County, Romania
- Șpring (river), in Alba County, Romania
- Springs, Gauteng, South Africa
- Springs, the location of Dubai British School, Dubai
- Spring Village, Saint Vincent and the Grenadines
- Spring Village, Shropshire, England

== People ==
=== Names ===
- Spring (given name)
- Spring (surname), including a list of people with the name

=== Groups ===
- Spring baronets, of Pakenham
- Spring family, English noble family

=== People with the given name ===
- Spring Byington (1886–1971), American actress

== Arts, entertainment and media ==
=== Paintings ===
- The Spring (La Primavera), by Giuseppe Arcimboldo
- Spring (Alma-Tadema painting), an 1894 oil painting by Lawrence Alma-Tadema
- Spring (Plastov painting), 1954, by Arkady Plastov
- The Spring (or La Source), by Francis Picabia
- Primavera (Botticelli) (English translation: Spring), by Sandro Botticelli, c. 1482
- Spring, by Édouard Manet
- Spring, by Christopher Williams

=== Film ===
- In Spring (1929 film) (Весной), a Soviet film
- Spring (1969 film), an Estonian film
- Spring (2011), a short film by British director Hong Khaou
- Spring (2014 film), an American romantic science fiction horror film
- Spring (2019 film), an animated short film created by the Blender Institute

=== Television ===
- "Spring" (Pee-wee's Playhouse), an episode of Pee-wee's Playhouse
- Spring (TV series), a Flemish-Belgian television series

=== Literature ===
- Spring (Runelords), a character in The Runelords series of fantasy novels by David Farland
- Spring (Kevade), a novel by Oskar Luts, basis for the 1969 film

=== Music ===
==== Groups ====
- Spring (English band), an English band, or the band's only album
- Spring (Malaysian rock band), formed in the 1980s
- Spring, a Belgian band that performed at Marktrock in 2004
- American Spring, a 1970s pop music duo, known from 1971/'72 as "Spring"
- Springs, a Japanese band, formed by Aya Hirano, Yuuki Yoshida, Ayaka Itō

==== Albums and EPs ====
- Spring (Wallows EP), 2018
- Spring (Akdong Musician EP), 2016
- Spring (American Spring album), 1972
- Spring (April EP), 2016
- Spring (Cyann & Ben album), 2004
- Spring (Jon Foreman EP), 2008
- Spring (Irène Schweizer and Jürg Wickihalder album), 2014
- Spring (Tony Williams album), 1965
- Spring (single album), by Park Bom, 2019
- Spring, an album by Clay Hart, 1969
- Spring, an EP by Subtle, 2003
- Spring!, an album by The Lettermen, (1967)
- The Blake Project: Spring, an album by Finn Coren, 1997
  - Spring: The Appendix, a follow-up album, 1998

==== Songs ====
- "Spring" (Rammstein song)
- "Spring" (RMB song), 1996
- "Spring" (Tanya Tucker song), 1975

==== Classical works ====
- "Spring" (concerto), "La primavera", from Vivaldi's The Four Seasons
- Spring (Rachmaninoff), a 1902 cantata by Sergei Rachmaninoff
- "Spring" (sonata), Violin Sonata No. 5 by Beethoven
- In Spring, a symphony by John Knowles Paine
- Spring Quartet, String Quartet No. 14 by Mozart
- Spring Symphony, a symphony by Benjamin Britten
- Symphony No. 1 (Schumann) (Spring), by Robert Schumann
- "Spring", song by Frédéric Chopin

=== Other media ===
- Spring: A Journal of Archetype and Culture, a psychology journal

== Brands and organizations ==
- Spring (company), a computer software company owned by Pivotal Software
- Spring, Inc., formerly Teespring, an e-commerce company that allows people to create and sell custom apparel
- Spring (store), a Canada-based shoe retailer
- Spring Airlines, a Chinese airline
- Spring! (brand), a brand of bottled water
- Springs Global, a Brazil-based corporation
- Spring (political party), a movement in Poland
- SPRING Singapore, a governmental department of Singapore
- Dacia Spring, an electric city car

== Science and technology ==
=== Computing ===
- Spring (application), an E-commerce platform
- Spring (operating system), an experimental operating system from Sun Microsystems
- SPRING, a GIS and remote-sensing image-processing system with an object-oriented data-model
- Spring Framework, an application-framework for the Java platform

=== Other uses in science and technology ===
- Spring green, occurs between green and cyan in the visible spectrum

== Other uses ==
- Sacred spring, a revered spring or well
- Spring (building), a residential condominium in Austin, Texas, US
- Springs Christian Academy, a private school in Winnipeg, Manitoba, Canada
- Forward or aft spring, a method of mooring a vessel to a shore fixture

== See also ==
- Category:Spring (season), for articles related to the season
- Category:Springs (hydrology) , for articles related to the water source
- Category:Springs (mechanical), for articles related to the device
- Fountain (disambiguation)
- Hooke's law, for the mathematical model of certain processes
- Primavera (disambiguation)
- Printemps (disambiguation)
- Spring Creek (disambiguation)
- Spring equinox (disambiguation)
- Spring Lake (disambiguation)
- Spring River (disambiguation)
- Spring Township (disambiguation)
- Springer (disambiguation)
- Springfield (disambiguation)
- Springleaf (disambiguation)
- Springtime (disambiguation)
- Springville (disambiguation)
- Sprung (disambiguation)
