= Springer (surname) =

Springer is a German surname. Szprynger and Szpringer are Polonised forms. Špringer is the Slavonised form, used for example in the Czech Republic, Slovakia, Croatia, and Serbia.

== Notable people with the surname "Springer" include ==
=== A ===
- Aaron Springer, American cartoonist
- Anna Joy Springer, American author
- Anton Heinrich Springer (1825–1891), German art historian
- Ashley Springer, American actor
- Axel Springer (1912–1985), German journalist

=== B ===
- Ben Springer (1897–1960), Dutch draughts player
- Bentley Springer (born 1979), Barbadian footballer
- Brad Springer (1904–1970), American baseball player
- Brian Springer (born 1959), American documentary filmmaker

=== C ===
- Carl Springer (1910–1980), American speed skater
- Carol Springer (1936–2019), American politician
- Caspar Springer (born 1937), Barbadian sprinter
- Charles Chesley Springer (1851–1922), American politician and educator
- Charles E. Springer (1928–2019), American politician
- Christian Springer (born 1971), German footballer
- Christoph Springer (born 1985), German cyclist
- Clement Springer, Saint Lucian musician
- Cornelis Springer (1817–1891), Dutch painter
- Curtis Howe Springer (1896–1985), American evangelist

=== D ===
- Dennis Springer (born 1965), American baseball player
- Dick Springer (1948–2023), American lawyer and politician
- Drew Springer (born 1966), American businessman and politician
- Durand W. Springer (1866–1943), American football coach

=== E ===
- Ed Springer (1867–1891), American baseball player
- Eintou Pearl Springer (born 1944), Trinidadian poet

=== F ===
- F. Springer (1932–2011), Dutch writer
- Frank Springer (1929–2009), American cartoonist
- Fred W. Springer (1859–1936), American politician
- Friede Springer (born 1942), German publisher

=== G ===
- Gadwin Springer (born 1993), French rugby league footballer
- Gary Springer (born 1962), American basketball player
- Geertruida H. Springer (1895–1988), Dutch painter
- George Springer (mathematician) (1924–2019), American mathematician
- George Springer (born 1989), American baseball player
- Gerd Springer (1927–1999), Austrian footballer
- Gregory Springer (born 1961), American rower

=== H ===
- Hugh Springer (1913–1994), Barbadian politician
- Hendy Springer (born 1964), Barbadian cricketer
- Hermann Springer (1908–1978), Swiss footballer

=== I ===
- Isidore Springer (1912–1942), Belgian diamond dealer

=== J ===
- Jaden Springer (born 2002), American basketball player
- James Springer, American politician
- Jan Springer (1850–1915), Dutch architect
- Jane Springer, American poet
- Janet L. Springer, American dancer
- Jean Springer (born 1939), Jamaican academic
- Jerell Springer (born 1999), American basketball player
- Jeremy Springer (born 1989), American football player and coach
- Jerry Springer (1944–2023), American television presenter
- Jim Springer (1926–2019), American basketball player
- Joe Springer (1916–2004), American pianist
- John Springer (disambiguation), multiple people
- Jon Springer (born 1966), American filmmaker
- Joy Springer, American politician
- Julius Springer (1817–1877), German publisher
- Justin Springer (born 1993), Kittitian footballer

=== K ===
- Kara Springer, Canadian industrial designer
- Khalid Springer (born 1982), Barbadian cricketer

=== L ===
- Larry Springer (born 1947), American politician
- Lewis Springer (1835–1895), Canadian politician
- Linda M. Springer, American actuary

=== M ===
- Macca Springer, New Zealand rugby union footballer
- Mark Springer, British pianist
- Max Springer (1877–1954), German organist
- Melissa Springer, American photojournalist
- Melle Springer (born 1998), Dutch footballer
- Mike Springer (born 1965), American golfer
- Moses Springer (1824–1898), Canadian businessman and politician
- Mychal Springer, American rabbi

=== N ===
- Nancy Springer (born 1948), American author
- Nicholas Springer (1985–2021), American Paralympic rugby union footballer
- Niko Springer (born 2000), German darts player

=== P ===
- Paul J. Springer, American author
- Philip Springer (born 1926), American composer

=== R ===
- Raymond S. Springer (1882–1947), American politician
- Rebecca Ruter Springer (1832–1904), American author
- René Springer (born 1979), German politician
- Reuben R. Springer (1800–1884), American businessman
- Richard Springer (1951–2010), American activist
- Rita Springer (born 1967), American musician
- Robert Springer (disambiguation), multiple people
- Roger Springer (born 1962), American musician
- Romel Springer, Barbadian politician
- Rosemarie Springer (1920–2019), German equestrian
- Roxanne Springer, American physicist
- Russ Springer (born 1968), American baseball player

=== S ===
- Shamar Springer (born 1997), Barbadian cricketer
- Sharon Springer, American politician
- Siegfried Springer (born 1943), Austrian pentathlete
- Steve Springer (born 1961), American baseball player
- Steven Springer (1951–2012), American guitarist
- Stewart Springer (1906–1991), American zoologist

=== T ===
- T. A. Springer (1926–2011), Dutch mathematician
- Thomas Springer (born 1984), Austrian triathlete
- Thomas J. Springer (born 1968), American politician
- Tianna Springer, Guyanese athlete
- Timothy A. Springer (born 1948), American immunologist
- Tony Springer, Canadian guitarist

=== W ===
- William Springer (disambiguation), multiple people

=== V ===
- Victor G. Springer (1928–2022), American ichthyologist

=== Y ===
- Yakov Springer (1921–1972), Polish-Israeli wrestler

=== Z ===
- Zola Springer (born 1972), American soccer player

== See also ==
- Justice Springer (disambiguation), a disambiguation page for Justices surnamed "Springer"
