= Spring Lake Township =

Spring Lake Township may refer to:

- Spring Lake Township, Tazewell County, Illinois
- Spring Lake Township, Ottawa County, Michigan
- Spring Lake Township, Scott County, Minnesota
- Spring Lake Township, Ward County, North Dakota, in Ward County, North Dakota
- Spring Lake Township, Hand County, South Dakota, in Hand County, South Dakota
- Spring Lake Township, Hanson County, South Dakota, in Hanson County, South Dakota
- Spring Lake Township, Kingsbury County, South Dakota, in Kingsbury County, South Dakota

== See also ==
- Spring Lake (disambiguation)
