= Primavera =

Primavera or La Primavera means the season spring in many Romance languages, and it may also refer to:

== Art ==
- Primavera exhibition, annual exhibition at the Museum of Contemporary Art Australia
- Primavera (Botticelli) by Botticelli (c. 1482)
- Primavera Gallery, an art gallery and shop in Cambridge, England
- La Primavera (sculpture), a fountain and sculpture in Mexico City

== Film and TV ==
- Prima Vera (film), a 1917 German silent film starring Erna Morena
- Primavera (film), a 2025 Italian film by Damiano Michieletto
- Primavera, a 2015 Argentine film by Santiago Giralt, starring Mike Amigorena
- Primavera (telenovela), a 1987 Venezuelan telenovela
- "Primavera" (Hannibal), an episode of the television series Hannibal

== Music ==
- Primavera Sound Festival, an annual music festival in Barcelona, Spain
- Prima Vera (band), a Norwegian comedy group
- Conjunto Primavera, Mexican music band

=== Classical ===
- "La primavera" (concerto), the first concerto of Vivaldi's The Four Seasons
- La primavera, sonata for violin and orchestra by Niccolò Paganini
- "La Primavera", the first movement of Ottorino Resphighi's Trittico Botticelliano, one of his orchestral works
- "Primavera", an art song by Gounod
- "Primavera", by Pier Adolfo Tirindelli (1858–1937)
- "Primavera", a tune by Ludovico Einaudi on the album Divenire
- "La Primavera", guitar composition by Castelnuovo-Tedesco
- "La Primavera", an art song by Puccini
- "La Primavera", orchestral work by Catalani
- "La Primavera", an art song by Reynaldo Hahn

=== Albums ===
- Primavera!, classical album by Suzie LeBlanc and Daniel Taylor
- Primavera, Eliana (singer)

=== Songs ===
- "Primavera", a Portuguese fado song, made famous by Amália Rodrigues
- "Primavera", a song by Robin Holcomb from Rockabye
- "Primavera", a song by Natalia LaFourcade from Las 4 Estaciones del Amor
- "Primavera", a song by Santana from the album Supernatural
- La Primavera (song), song by Sash! (feat. Patrizia Salvadore) on the album Life Goes On
- "La Primavera", a song by Manu Chao on the album Próxima Estación: Esperanza

== People ==
- Dianne Primavera (born 1950), American politician
- Elise Primavera (born 1955), American author and illustrator
- Giovan Leonardo Primavera (c. 1540–1585), composer and poet
- Giuseppe Primavera (1917–1998), Italian chess player
- Jim Primavera (born 1962), Canadian wheelchair curler
- Joseph Primavera (1926–2006), American violist and conductor
- Jurgenne H. Primavera (born 1947), widely cited Filipina marine scientist
- Nanda Primavera (1898–1995), Italian actress

== Places ==
- Base Primavera, an Argentine research station in Antarctica
- La Primavera, Vichada, a municipality in Colombia
- La Primavera Biosphere Reserve, a protected area in Mexico
- La Primavera District, Bolognesi, Peru
- Primavera, Chile, a commune in Tierra del Fuego, Chile
- Primavera, Pará, a municipality in the state of Pará, Brazil
- Primavera, Pernambuco, a city in the state of Pernambuco, Brazil

== Publications ==
- Primavera, a novel by Francesca Lia Block
- Primavera (magazine), a defunct Chicago-based feminist publication
- Primavera, a literary magazine from Mount Mary University

== Sport ==
- Esporte Clube Primavera, a Brazilian football club, in Indaiatuba, São Paulo state
- Primavera Esporte Clube, a Brazilian football club, in Primavera do Leste, Mato Grosso state
- Campionato Nazionale Primavera, Trofeo Giacinto Facchetti, an Italian defunct under-19 football (soccer) competition
  - Campionato Primavera 1, successor of Campionato Nazionale Primavera
  - Campionato Primavera 2, successor of Campionato Nazionale Primavera
  - Coppa Italia Primavera, an Italian football competition played for by youth teams from Campionato Primavera
- Milan–San Remo, an annual classic cycling race nicknamed "La Primavera"

== Other uses ==
- Pasta primavera, a pasta and vegetable dish
- Primavera (software), a project management software package
- Primavera Online High School
- Primavera Productions, a theatre production company
- Primavera Systems, a US-based vendor of project portfolio management software
- Primavera, a common name for the Roseodendron donnell-smithii tree and its wood
- Primavera, a model of Vespa scooter

== See also ==
- "Cervo a primavera", a 1980 song by Riccardo Cocciante
- Printemps (disambiguation)
- Spring (disambiguation)
- Springtime (disambiguation)
