= Springer =

Springer or springers may refer to:

== Publishers ==
- Springer Science+Business Media, a.k.a. Springer International Publishing, a worldwide publishing group founded in 1842 in Germany formerly known as Springer-Verlag.
  - Springer Nature, a multinational academic publishing group created by the merger of Springer Science+Business Media, Nature Publishing Group, Palgrave Macmillan, and Macmillan Education
- Axel Springer SE, a German publishing house, including several newspapers
- Springer Publishing, an American publishing company of academic journals and books, mainly focusing on public health.

== Places ==
United States

- Springer, New Mexico
- Springer, Oklahoma
- Springer Mountain, southern terminus of the Appalachian Trail
- Springer Opera House, Columbus, Georgia

== Animals ==
- In cattle, a cow or heifer near to calving
- English Springer Spaniel, a breed of dog
- Welsh Springer Spaniel, a breed of dog
- Springer (orca), an orca (killer whale) identified as A73 in her wild community

== Vehicle-related ==
- Springer (tank), a small demolition vehicle of the German Wehrmacht in WW2
- The British Army's name for the Tomcar
- Springer fork, a type of motorcycle fork

== Other ==
- Springer (architecture), the first voussoir of an arch
- Springer (surname)
- Springer School and Center, a school in Cincinnati
- Springer (EP), a 2003 record by the Danish music band Efterklang
- Springer (Transformers), a Transformers character
- The Jerry Springer Show – also known as Springer – an American daytime tabloid talk show hosted by talk show host Jerry Springer
- Big Spring Bombers, sometimes referred to as "Springers"
- Springer, an interstellar teleporter featured in A Million Open Doors, a science fiction novel by John Barnes

== See also ==
- Justice Springer (disambiguation)
