= Daphnis et Chloé =

1912 composition by Maurice Ravel

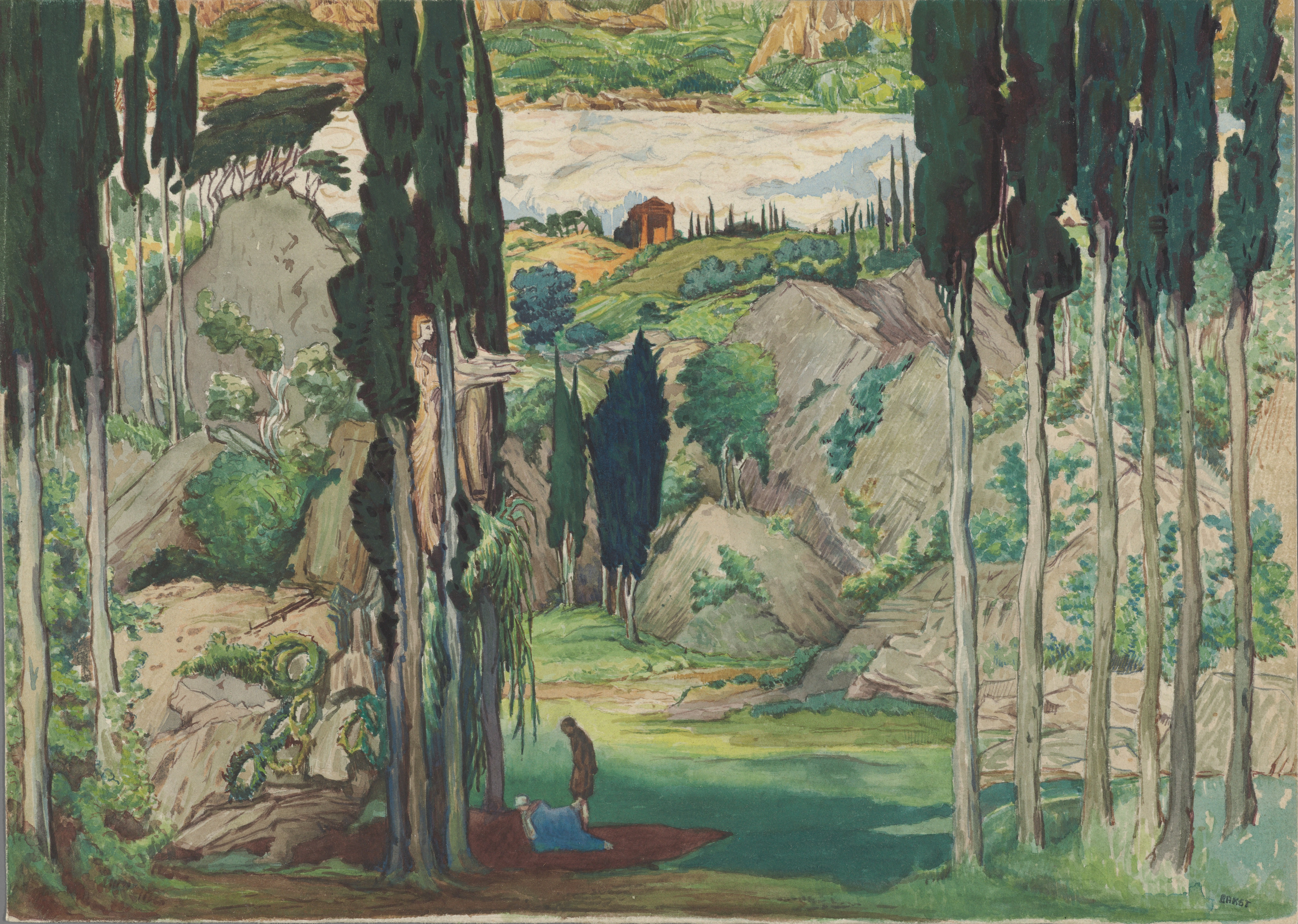
- Set design by Léon Bakst for the world premiere of Daphnis et Chloé, Paris 1912.
- Choreographer: Michel Fokine
- Music: Maurice Ravel
- Based on: Longus' Daphnis and Chloe
- Premiere: 8 June 1912; Théâtre du Châtelet, Paris
- Original ballet company: Ballets Russes
- Characters: Daphnis, Chloé
- Design: Léon Bakst
- Setting: Ancient Greece
- Created for: Vaslav Nijinsky and Tamara Karsavina

Daphnis et Chloé (1906–1912) is a ballet and orchestral concert work subtitled symphonie chorégraphique (choreographic symphony), for orchestra and wordless chorus by Maurice Ravel. It is in three main sections, or parties, and a dozen scenes, most of them dances, and lasts just under an hour, making it the composer's longest work. It premiered as a ballet, but it is more frequently given as a concert work, either complete or excerpted.

The dance scenario was adapted by choreographer Michel Fokine from a pastoral romance by the Greek writer Longus thought to date from the 2nd century AD, recounting the love between the goatherd Daphnis and the shepherdess Chloé. Scott Goddard in 1926 published a commentary on the changes to the story Fokine had to apply in order to make the scenario workable.

== Background ==
Ravel wrote Daphnis et Chloé between 1906 and 1912, when he established his mature style, with its technical and expressive sophistication. He was commissioned by impresario Sergei Diaghilev for the Ballets Russes and completed it some months before they staged the premiere.

Its harmonies and orchestration built on Debussyan Impressionism in music. Ravel's use of a chorus may have been influenced by Paul Dukas's Ariane et Barbe-bleue (1907), and the chorus's wordless treatment in Daphnis et Chloé followed Debussy's use of a textless chorus in Printemps (Spring, 1887).

== Composition ==
At nearly an hour, Daphnis et Chloé is Ravel's longest work, contrasting with his tendency to smaller works. It integrates music, drama, and ballet, and he shaped the music closely to the drama and stage action. Four discernible leitmotifs unify the music. The orchestration has been described as innovative, richly colored, and precisely controlled in a manner recalling Ravel's Ma mère l'Oye (Mother Goose) suite, orchestrated for smaller forces.

=== Instrumentation ===
Daphnis et Chloé is scored for large orchestra:

Woodwinds
1 piccolo (plus an additional piccolo onstage)
2 flutes
1 alto flute in G
2 oboes
1 English horn
1 E♭ clarinet (plus an additional E♭ clarinet
onstage)
2 clarinets in B-flat and A
1 bass clarinet in B-flat
3 bassoons
1 contrabassoon

Brass
4 horns (plus an additional horn offstage)
4 trumpets in C (plus an additional trumpet offstage)
3 trombones
1 tuba

Percussion
timpani
snare drum
1 pair of castanets
5 crotales in B, E, F, C, and C-sharp
1 pair of crash cymbals
2 suspended cymbals
wind machine
bass drum
field drum
tambourine
tam-tam
triangle
celesta
glockenspiel
xylophone

Strings
2 harps
16-18 1st violins, 14-16 2nd violins, 12 violas, 12 cellos, 8 double basses

Voices
Wordless SATB choir (offstage)

(For the chorus: about 80 singers: 25 sopranos, 25 altos, 15 tenors, 15 basses)

=== Structure ===
Part I

Introduction et Danse religieuse
Danse générale
Danse grotesque de Dorcon
Danse légère et gracieuse de Daphnis
Danse de Lycéion
Danse lente et mystérieuse des Nymphes

Part II

Introduction
Danse guerrière
Danse suppliante de Chloé

Part III

Lever du jour (Sunrise)
Pantomime (Les amours de Pan et Syrinx)
Danse générale (Bacchanale)

=== Synopsis ===
==== Part I ====
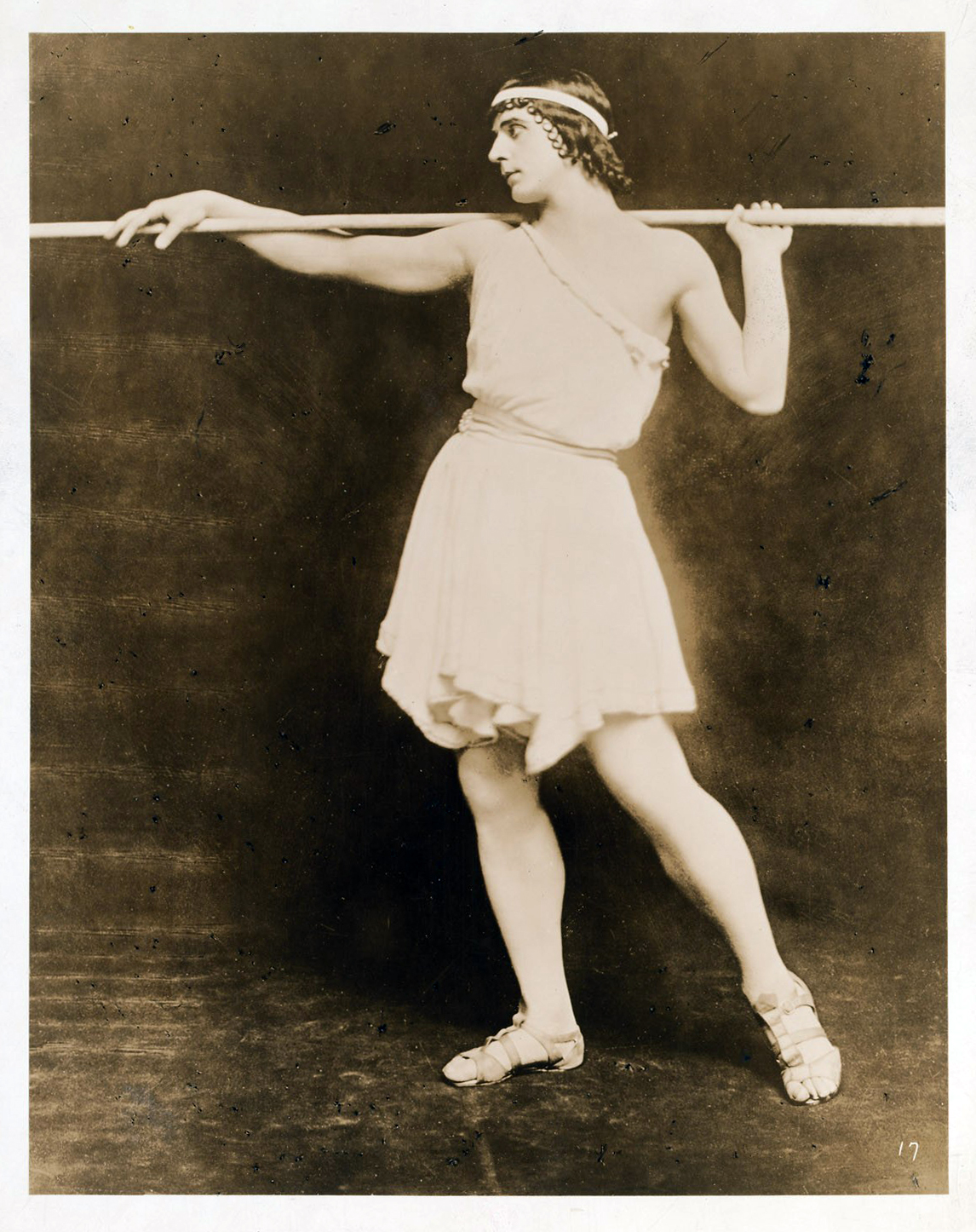
Michel Fokine, Daphnis et Chloé, c. 1910

On the island of Lesbos, in a meadow at the edge of a sacred wood stands a grotto hewn out of rock, at the entrance of which is an antique sculpture of three Nymphs. Somewhat toward the background, to the left, a large rock vaguely resembles the form of the god Pan. In the background sheep are grazing. It is a bright spring afternoon. When the curtain rises, the stage is empty. Youths and girls enter, carrying gifts for the Nymphs in baskets. Gradually the stage fills. The group bows before the altar of the Nymphs. The girls drape the pedestals with garlands. In the far background, Daphnis is seen following his flock. Chloé joins him. They proceed toward the altar and disappear at a bend. Daphnis and Chloé enter at the foreground and bow before the Nymphs.

The girls entice Daphnis and dance around him. Chloé feels the first twinges of jealousy. At that moment she is swept into the dance of the youths. The cowherd Dorcon proves to be especially bold. Daphnis in turn seems upset. At the end of the dance, Dorcon tries to kiss Chloé. She innocently offers her cheek, but with an abrupt motion Daphnis pushes aside the cowherd and approaches Chloé affectionately. The youths intervene. They position themselves in front of Chloé and gently lead Daphnis away. One of them proposes a dance contest between Daphnis and Dorcon. A kiss from Chloé will be the victor’s prize. The group sarcastically imitates the clumsy movements of the cowherd, who ends his dance in the midst of general laughter. Everyone invites Daphnis to accept his reward. Dorcon comes forward as well, but he is chased off by the group, accompanied by loud laughter.

The laughter ceases at the sight of the radiant group formed by the embracing Daphnis and Chloé. The group withdraws, taking along Chloé. Daphnis remains, immobile, as if in ecstasy. Then he lies face down in the grass, his face in his hands. Lyceion enters. She notices the young shepherd, approaches, and raises his head, placing her hands over his eyes. Daphnis thinks this is a game of Chloé’s but he recognizes Lyceion and tries to pull away. As though inadvertently, she drops one of her veils. Daphnis picks it up and places it back on her shoulders. She resumes her dance, which, at first more languorous, becomes steadily more animated until the end. Another veil slips to the ground, and is again retrieved by Daphnis. Vexed, she runs off mocking him, leaving the young shepherd very disturbed. Warlike sounds and war cries are heard, coming nearer. In the middle ground, women run across the stage, pursued by pirates. Daphnis thinks of Chloé, perhaps in danger, and runs off to save her. Chloé hastens on in panic, seeking shelter. She throws herself before the altar of the Nymphs, beseeching their protection.

A group of brigands burst on stage, capture the girl and carry her off. Daphnis enters looking for Chloé. He discovers on the ground a sandal that she lost in the struggle. Mad with despair, he curses the deities who were unable to protect the girl, and falls swooning at the entrance of the grotto. As night falls, the wind blows, and an unnatural light suffuses the landscape. A little flame shines suddenly from the head of one of the statues. The Nymph comes to life and descends from her pedestal, followed by the second and then the third Nymph. They consult together and begin a slow and mysterious dance. They notice Daphnis, bend down and dry his tears. They revive him and lead him toward the large rock, and invoke the god Pan. Gradually the form of the god is outlined. Daphnis prostrates himself in supplication.

==== Part II ====
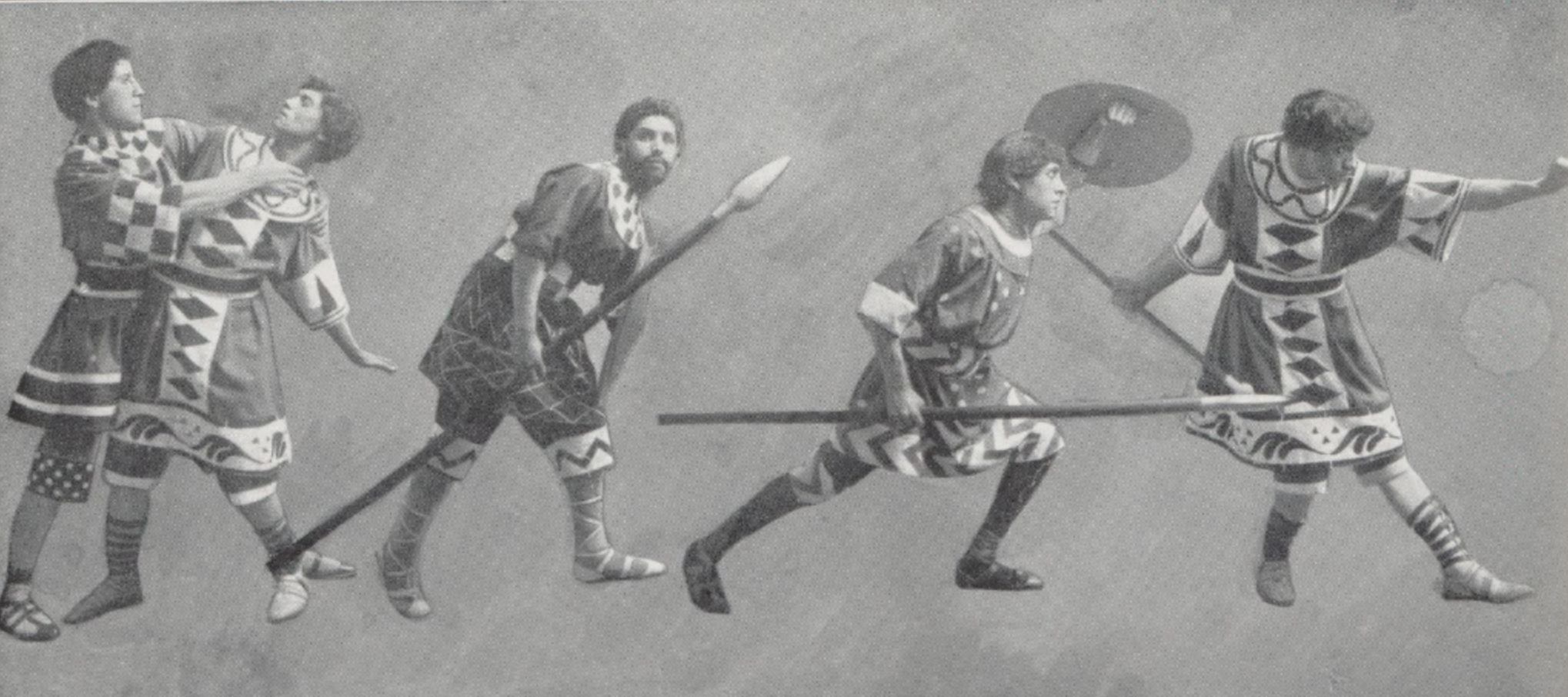
Several pirates (Ballets Russes, premiere)

Voices are heard from off stage, at first very distant. A trumpet calls and the voices come nearer. There is a dull glimmer. The setting is the pirate camp on a very rugged seacoast, with the sea as the background. To the right and left is a view of large crags. A trireme is seen near the shore and there are cypresses present. Pirates are seen running to and fro carrying plunder. More and more torches are brought, which illuminate the scene. Bryaxis commands that the captive be brought. Chloé, her hands tied, is led in by two pirates. Bryaxis orders her to dance. Chloé performs a dance of supplication. She tries to flee, but she is brought back violently. Despairing, she resumes her dance. Again she tries to escape but is brought back again. She abandons herself to despair, thinking of Daphnis. Bryaxis tries to carry her off. Although she beseeches, the leader carries her off triumphantly. Suddenly the atmosphere seems charged with strange elements. Various places are lit by invisible hands, and little flames flare up. Fantastic beings crawl or leap here and there, and satyrs appear from every side and surround the brigands. The earth opens and the fearsome shadow of Pan is outlined on the hills in the background, making a threatening gesture. Everyone flees in horror except Chloé, who is given a wreath crown.

==== Part III ====
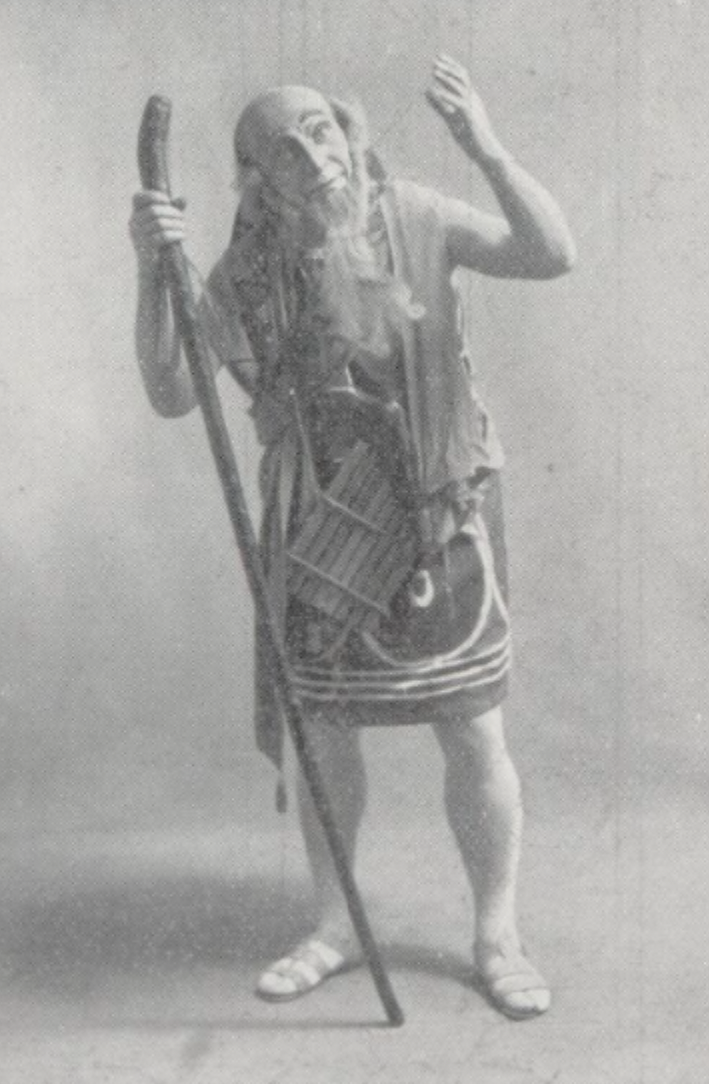
The old shepherd "Lammon" (Enrico Cecchetti, premiere)

Morning at the grotto of the Nymphs. There is no sound but the murmur of rivulets produced by the dew that trickles from the rocks. Daphnis lies, still unconscious, at the entrance of the grotto. Gradually the day breaks. The songs of birds are heard. Far off, a shepherd passes with his flock. Another shepherd crosses in the background. A group of herdsmen enters looking for Daphnis and Chloé. They discover Daphnis and wake him. Anxiously he looks around for Chloé. She appears at last, surrounded by shepherdesses. They throw themselves into each other’s arms. Daphnis notices Chloé’s wreath. His dream was a prophetic vision. The intervention of Pan is manifest. The old shepherd Lammon explains that, if Pan has saved Chloé, it is in memory of the nymph Syrinx, whom the god once loved. Daphnis and Chloé mime the tale of Pan and Syrinx. Chloé plays the young nymph wandering in the meadow. Daphnis, as Pan, appears and declares his love. The nymph rebuffs him. The god becomes more insistent. She disappears into the reeds. In despair, he picks several stalks to form a flute and plays a melancholy air. Chloé reappears and interprets through her dance the accents of his flute. The dance becomes more and more animated, and in a mad whirling, Chloé falls into Daphnis’s arms. Before the altar of the Nymphs, he pledges his love, offering a sacrifice of two sheep. A group of girls enters dressed as bacchantes, shaking tambourines. Daphnis and Chloé embrace tenderly. A group of youths rushes on stage and the ballet ends with a bacchanale.

=== Suites ===
Daphnis et Chloé
Suite No. 2 (arr.), United States Air Force Band

Ravel extracted music from the symphonie to make two orchestral suites, which can be performed with or without the chorus. The first was prepared as early as 1911, that is, before the staging. The second suite, corresponding to part three, was issued in 1913 and is particularly popular. Ravel adhered to his description of the music in his formal titling of the suites:

- Fragments symphoniques de 'Daphnis et Chloé' (Nocturne—Interlude—Danse guerrière), 1911, commonly called Suite No. 1
- Fragments symphoniques de 'Daphnis et Chloé' (Lever du jour—Pantomime—Danse générale), 1913, or Suite No. 2

== Reception ==
Daphnis et Chloé has been called Ravel's greatest orchestral achievement and one of the finest French ballets of the 20th century. It has been more often performed in concert than staged as a ballet.

=== Premiere ===
Diaghilev's Ballets Russes staged the premiere at Paris's Théâtre du Châtelet on 8 June 1912, with sets designed by Léon Bakst, choreography by Fokine, and the Orchestre Colonne conducted by Pierre Monteux. Tamara Karsavina and Vaslav Nijinsky danced the shepherdess and goatherd.

== Video recordings ==
- 1982: Choreographer: Graeme Murphy. Principal dancers: Carl Morrow (Daphnis), Victoria Taylor (Chloe), Janet Vernon (Lykanion), Paul Saliba (Pan). Sydney Dance Company. Orchestra by Orchestral Services Ltd., conducted by Bram Tovey, leader Jack Maguire. Filmed at Sadler's Wells Theatre, London. Made for Channel Four by Independent Film Production Associates, Ltd. Released on VHS tape by Home Vision Films, Chicago, Illinois.
- 2014: Choreographer: Benjamin Millepied. Principal dancers: Aurélie Dupont (Chloé), Hervé Moreau (Daphnis), Eleonora Abbagnato (Lycénion). Paris Opera Ballet. Paris Opera Orchestra and Chorus, conducted by Philippe Jordan. Recorded live, 2014, Opéra Bastille, in a double bill with Balanchine's Le Palais de Cristal. Production: Paris Opera, Telemondis, Mezzo.
- 2022: Choreographer: Thierry Malandain. Principal dancers: Natalia de Froberville (Chloé), Ramiro Gómez Samón (Daphnis), Alexandre De Oliveira Ferreira (Pan). Ballet of the Opéra National du Capitole. Orchestre national du Capitole, conducted by Maxime Pascal. Recorded live, 2022, Théâtre du Capitole, Toulouse. A film by Patrick Lauze. Production: Les Films Figures Libres, with the participation of Mezzo.

== Transcriptions and connections ==
Andrew Zhou transcribed the Suite No. 2 for solo piano in 2021. The title song of Burton Lane's musical On a Clear Day You Can See Forever recalls Ravel's Lever du jour melody.
