= Au printemps =

Au Printemps (English: "In Spring") can refer to:

- Au printemps (album), a 1958 album by Jacques Brel
  - "Au printemps", a song on that album
- "Au printemps", an 1865 song by Charles Gounod, see List of compositions by Charles Gounod
- "Au printemps", an 1867 song by Léo Delibes, see List of compositions by Léo Delibes
- "Au printemps", an 1881 short story by Guy de Maupassant, see Guy de Maupassant bibliography

== See also ==
- Printemps (disambiguation)
