= Sprung =

Sprung may refer to:

- Sprung rhythm a poetic rhythm designed to imitate the rhythm of natural speech
- Sprung mass (or sprung weight) the portion of the vehicle's total mass that is supported above the suspension
- Sprung floor, a floor that absorbs shocks

== People with the surname ==
- Adolf Sprung (1848–1909), German meteorologist
- Anna Sprung (born 1975), Russian biathlete
- Julian Sprung (born 1966), American writer on marine aquarium fishkeeping
- Rudolf Sprung (1925-2015), German politician

== Film and TV ==
- Sprung (film), a 1997 hip-hop comedy
- Sprung! The Magic Roundabout, a 2005 animation
- Sprung, a 2009 comedy short film with Samara Weaving
- Sprung (TV series), 2022 series on the streaming service Amazon Freevee.

== Games ==
- Sprung (video game), video game by Ubisoft for the Nintendo DS.

== Music ==
- Sprung (soundtrack), soundtrack album of the 1997 film
- "Sprung", a song by Nu Flavor, 1999
- Sprung, a 2011 hip hop festival featuring Lowrider
- Sprung Music Festival, Stanford University FloMo Field
- "I'm Sprung", a song by T-Pain

== See also ==
- Hohl-Sprung
- Spring (disambiguation)
