= Tony Alamo =

Tony Alamo may refer to:

- Tony Alamo (1934–2017), American founder of the Alamo Christian Foundation
- Antonio Alamo, Jr. (born c. 1964), American physician and Nevada gaming official
