= Printemps (disambiguation) =

Printemps (pronounced [pʁɛ̃tɑ̃]; meaning "spring" (springtime) in French) may refer to:

- Printemps, a French chain of department stores
- Printemps (album), a 1998 mandopop album by Leslie Cheung
- Printemps (ballet), a 1972 U.S. ballet by Lorca Massine
- Printemps (composition), an 1887 symphony by Claude Debussy
- Printemps (song), a 2004 electronica song by Helium Viola, from the album Liod
- Le Printemps (The Return of Spring), an 1886 painting by William-Adolphe Bouguereau
- Le Printemps (Spring), an 1881 painting by Édouard Manet, see List of paintings by Édouard Manet
- Grand Prix du Printemps (Spring grand prix race), a horse race in France
- Coupe du Printemps (Spring Cup), a figure skating competition in Luxembourg
- Yvonne Printemps (1894-1977) a French singer-actress
- Printemps, a sub-unit of μ’s, from the Love Live! franchise

== See also ==
- Au printemps (disambiguation), French meaning "in springtime"
- Primavera (disambiguation), Italian, Spanish and Portuguese for "springtime"
- Spring (disambiguation)
- Springtime (disambiguation)
