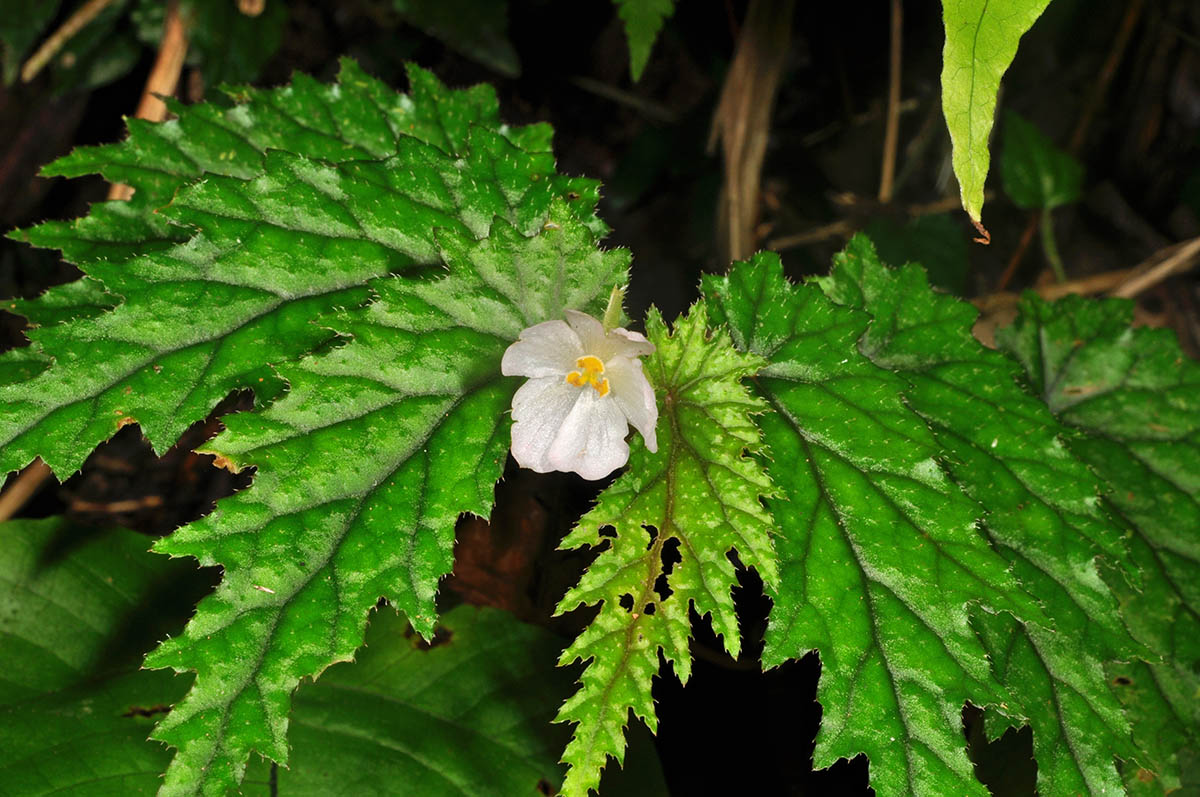

Scientific classification
- Kingdom: Plantae
- Clade: Tracheophytes
- Clade: Angiosperms
- Clade: Eudicots
- Clade: Rosids
- Order: Cucurbitales
- Family: Begoniaceae
- Genus: Begonia
- Species: B. jurgenneae

Binomial name
- Begonia jurgenneae Naive & Buenvenida

= Begonia jurgenneae =

Species of plant

Begonia jurgenneae is a species of flowering plant in the family Begoniaceae. It is endemic to Panay island in the Philippines.

== Taxonomy ==
Begonia jurgenneae was discovered by a team led by Harold Buenvenida, Lillian Jennifer Rodriguez, and Mark Arcebal Naive. The research team was funded by the Capiz Provincial Environment and Natural Resources Office (CaPENRO) of the Capiz provincial government.

Their findings was published in Taiwania in August 2025.

== Etymology ==
The plant was named after mangrove scientist Jurgenne Primavera.

== Distribution and habitat ==
Begonia jurgenneae is endemic to Panay island and is documented to exist in Capiz and Iloilo provinces. They are known to live in moist limestone habitats between 60 and 600 meters (200 and 1,970 ft) above sea level.

== Conservation ==
As of August 2025, only 100 specimens of Begonia jurgenneae has been documented. Researchers are recommending the inclusion of the plant in the IUCN Red List.
