= Silvercryst Resort =

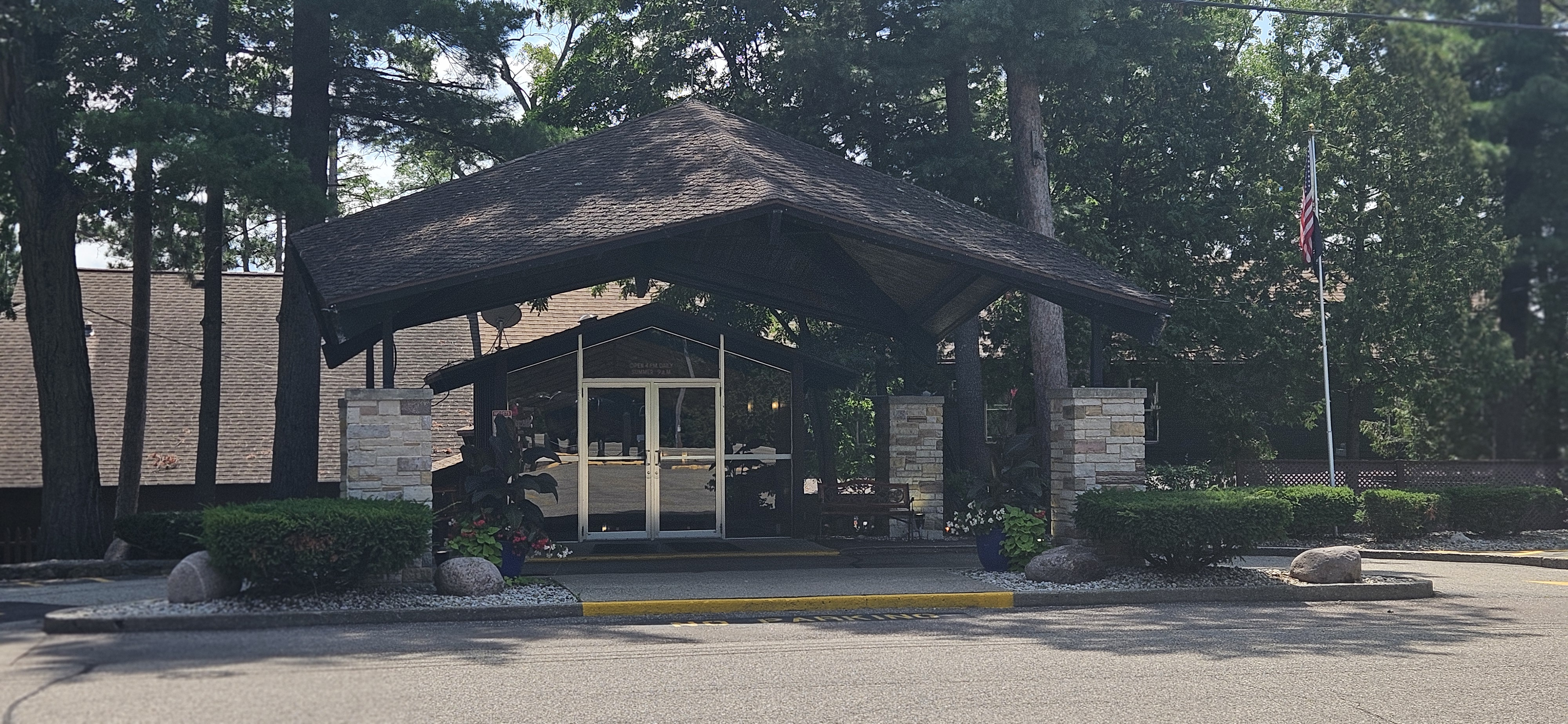
- The front entrance to the Silvercryst.
- Interactive map of the Silvercryst Resort area

General information
- Status: Operating
- Location: Wautoma, Wisconsin, U.S., W7015 State Highway 21 East, Wautoma, WI 54982
- Coordinates: 44°03′31.2″N 89°14′01.7″W
- Opening: 1894
- Owner: Mike Pfaller and James Heck

Website
- www.silvercryst.com

The Silvercryst Resort (commonly referred to as The Silvercryst) is a historic lakeside resort, motel, and traditional Wisconsin supper club located on Silver Lake near Wautoma, Wisconsin. It is in the town of Marion. Established in 1894, it is one of the oldest continuously operating vacation resorts and dining establishments in Waushara County.

== History ==
The Silvercryst was established in 1894 as a lakeside retreat along the shores of Silver Lake to serve vacationers seeking summer recreation in central Wisconsin.

During the 1918 influenza pandemic (often historically referenced alongside avian flu outbreaks of the era), the property remained open, catering to city residents from Milwaukee and Chicago escaping heavily populated urban centers in search of rural retreat and fresh air.

The resort has had several owners in its history. It was founded as the Silvercryst Summer Resort by William W. Walker. After 1905, the resort went through several other owners. In the 1950s, it was operated by Bernard Honl and his family, who maintained the resort until it was purchased by its current owners in 2000.

Throughout the mid-to-late 20th century, the property evolved into a quintessential Wisconsin supper club, adding expanded dining facilities, a cocktail lounge overlooking the lake, and updated motel options alongside its original lodge accommodations. During the 20th century, the resort featured a floating metal slide as part of its private beach, which was removed in favor of a floating platform in the 21st century.

The resort features a giant fiberglass bull statue outside named "Boris the Bull," which was added in the 1960s as a roadside landmark. Boris was involved in a DUI car accident on September 13, 2014, and needed to be repaired in Sparta, Wisconsin. The car that hit Boris ended up underneath the statute. The driver was not injured. His "son," Bingo, was hauled into place until Boris could be repaired.

== Features and Amenities ==
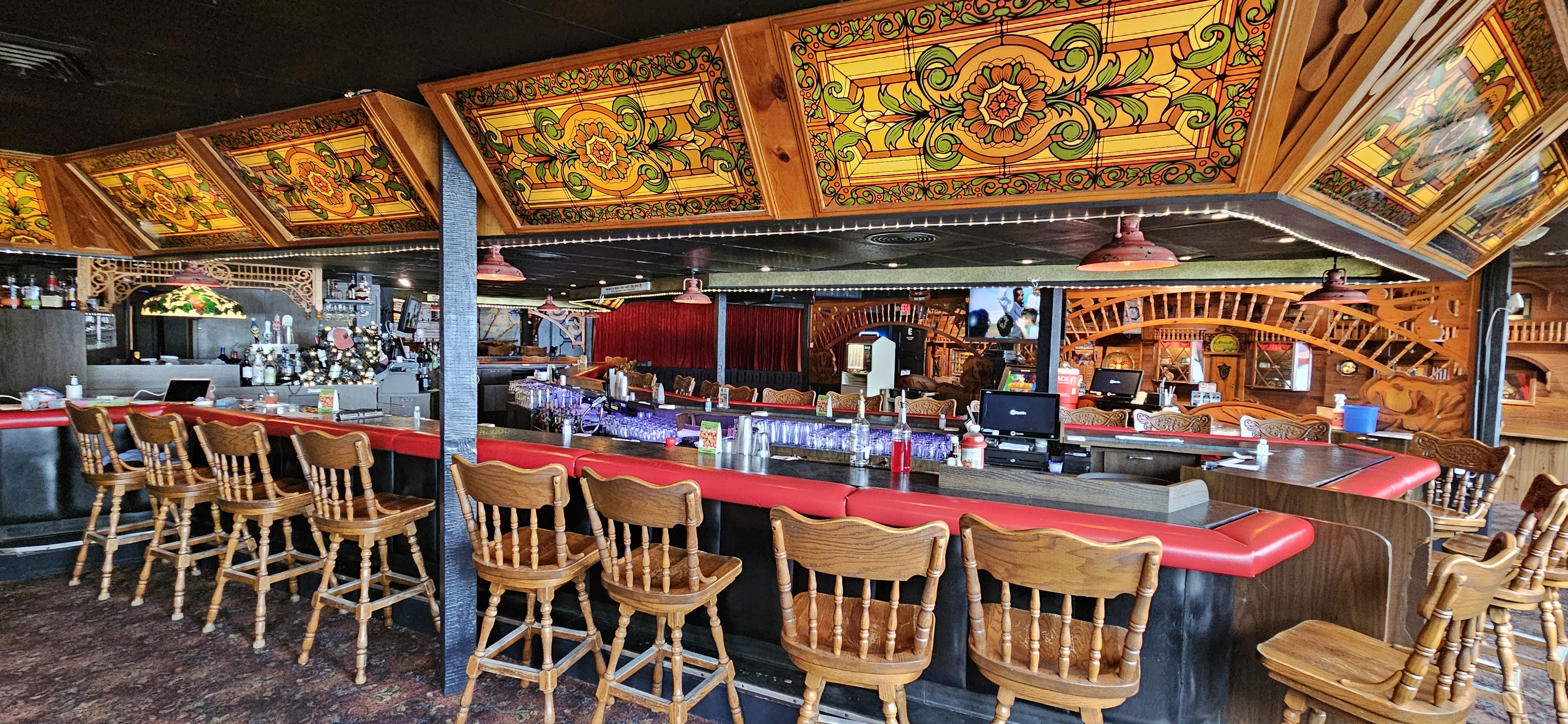
The Interior of the Silvercryst Bar area.

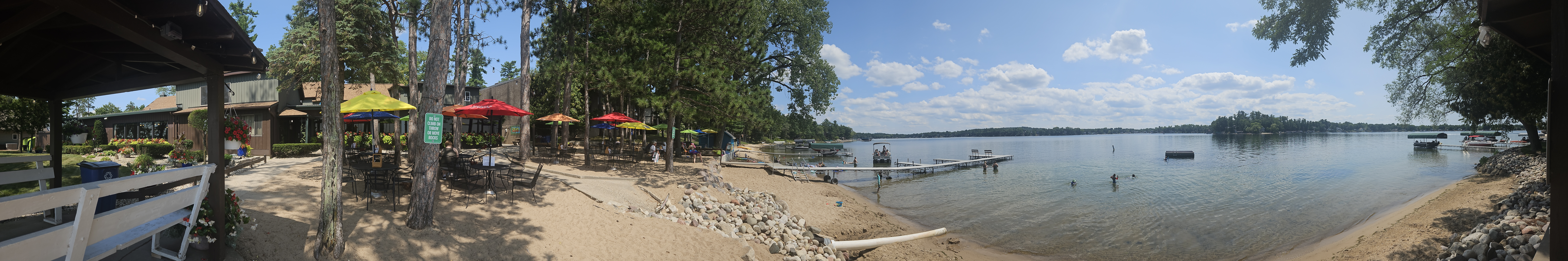
The private beach of the Silvercryst features a floating raft, boat dock, and outdoor bar.

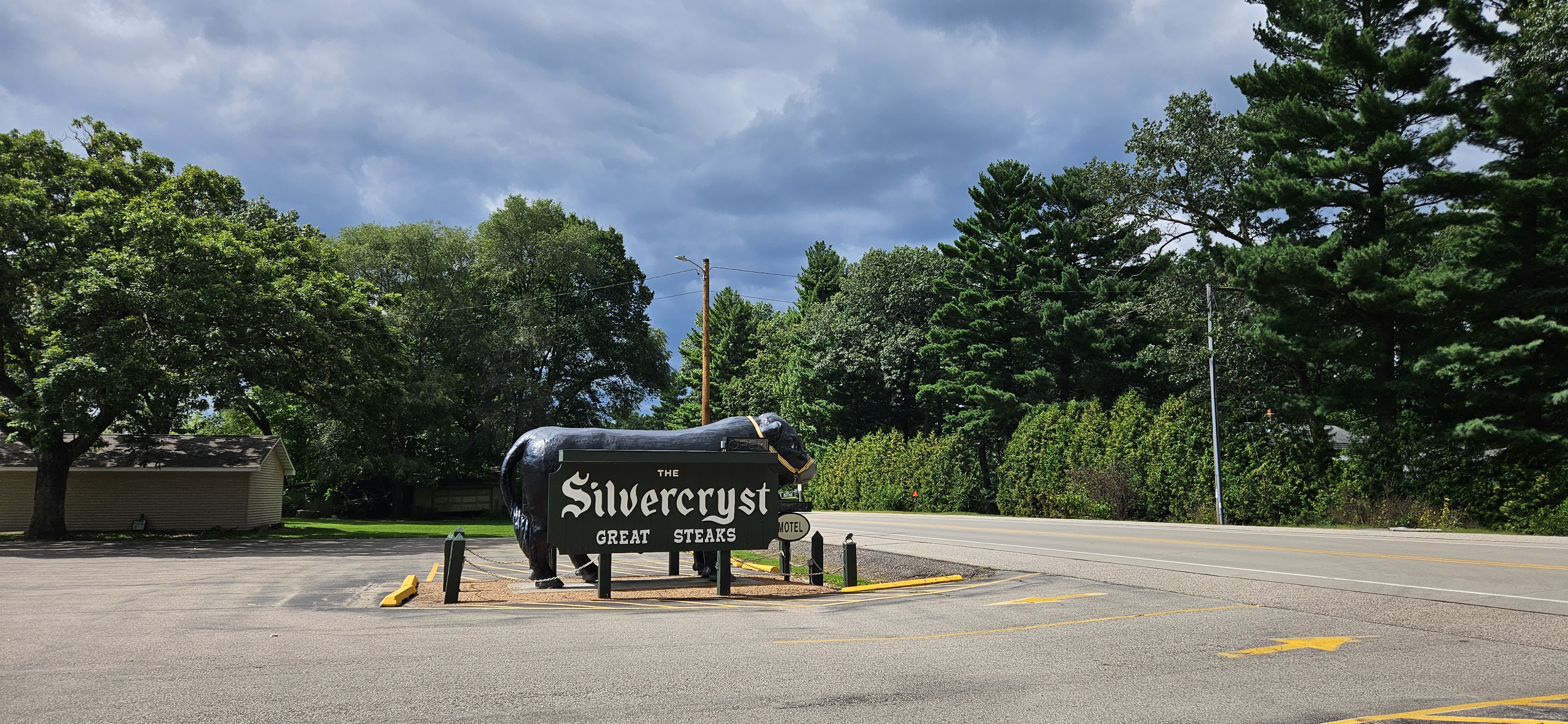
Boris the Bull and the Silvercryst sign.

Operating as a traditional Wisconsin supper club, the main restaurant is known for hand-cut steaks, seafood, and house-made salad dressings. The property features 22 total guest units, consisting of 13 motel-style rooms and 9 traditional lodge-style rooms. In addition to formal dining, the hotel features a large bar with seating and live entertainment on a regular basis.
