= Miles Nelson Pike =

American judge (1899–1969)

Justice of the Nevada Supreme Court (Seat E)
- In office 1959 – June 1961
- Appointed by: Grant Sawyer
- Preceded by: Charles M. Merrill
- Succeeded by: Gordon R. Thompson

1st Chair of the Nevada Gaming Commission
- In office 1959–1959
- Appointed by: Grant Sawyer
- Preceded by: Position Established
- Succeeded by: Milton Keefer

United States Attorney for the District of Nevada
- In office 1939–1943
- In office 1947?–1952

Personal details
- Born: November 24, 1899 Wadsworth, Nevada
- Died: May 27, 1969
- Party: Democrat
- Education: Hastings College of the Law

Military service
- Allegiance: United States
- Branch/service: United States Navy; United States Army
- Rank: Lieutenant colonel
- Battles/wars: World War I; World War II

Miles Nelson Pike (November 24, 1899 – May 27, 1969) was a justice of the Supreme Court of Nevada from 1959 to 1961.

== Early life and education ==
Pike was born in Wadsworth on November 24, 1899, the son of Judge and Mrs. W.H.A. Pike. They moved to Reno in 1902 where Pike lived throughout his life. He graduated from Reno High School and served during World War I as a Navy midshipman.

After the war, he graduated from the University of Nevada in 1923 and Hastings College of the Law where he received his LLB degree in 1928.

In 1932 he married Marchand Newman and they had two sons, Russell and Roy Robert.

== Career ==
After practicing briefly in San Francisco, Pike returned to Reno and entered private practice. In 1934, he was appointed first assistant United States Attorney, and in 1939 he was appointed United States Attorney for the District of Nevada. In 1943, he resigned to join the infantry during World War II where he served as a Lt. Colonel. After the war he was reappointed United States Attorney where he served until he resigned in 1952. That year he was elected President of the Nevada State Bar.

In 1959, Pike was appointed as the first chairman of the Nevada Gaming Commission.

When Justice Charles M. Merrill was appointed to the United States Court of Appeals for the Ninth Circuit, Governor Grant Sawyer appointed Pike to succeed Merrill.

In June 1961, Pike resigned from the Supreme Court and returned to his old firm where he continued to practice law until his death in 1969.

Political offices
Preceded by Charles Merton Merrill	Justice of the Supreme Court of Nevada; 1959–1961	Succeeded by Gordon R. Thompson
