= Springtime =

Springtime may refer to:

- Spring (season), one of the four temperate seasons

== Film and television ==
- Springtime (1920 film), an American silent comedy starring Oliver Hardy
- Springtime (1929 film), a Silly Symphonies animated Disney short film
- Springtime (1947 film), a Soviet musical-comedy-science-fiction film
- Springtime (2004 film), a South Korean film
- Springtime, a 1999 South Korean TV series starring Jang Dong-gun and Kim Hyun-joo
- "Springtime" (M*A*S*H), a 1974 television episode
- "Springtime" (Mickey Mouse), a 2018 television episode

== Music ==
- Springtime (band), a band that represented Austria at Eurovision 1978
- Springtime (guitar), an experimental guitar created by Yuri Landman
- Springtime (Freakwater album), 1998
- Springtime (Springtime album), by the Australian supergroup Springtime, 2021
- "Springtimes", a song by the Smashing Pumpkins from Atum: A Rock Opera in Three Acts, 2023

== Painting ==
- Springtime (Claude Monet), an 1872 painting by Claude Monet
- Springtime (Pierre Auguste Cot), an 1873 painting by Pierre Auguste Cot
- Springtime (Wilbur Winfield Woodward), a latter 19th-century painting by Wilbur Winfield Woodward

== Other uses ==
- Springtime!, an entertainment company and record label
- Springtime, Montana, US, an unincorporated community

== See also ==
- Primavera (disambiguation)
- Printemps (disambiguation)
- Spring (disambiguation)
