= Spring Lake, Minnesota =

Spring Lake, Minnesota may refer to:

- Spring Lake, Isanti County, Minnesota, an unincorporated community in Isanti County
- Spring Lake, Itasca County, Minnesota, an unincorporated community in Itasca County
- Spring Lake, Scott County, Minnesota, an unincorporated community in Scott County
