= Minnesota State Highway 282 =

State highway in Minnesota, United States

Trunk Highway 282
- MN 282 highlighted in red

Route information
- Maintained by MnDOT
- Length: 7.655 mi (12.320 km)
- Existed: July 1, 1949–present

Major junctions
- West end: US 169 / CSAH 9 at Jordan
- MN 21 at Jordan
- East end: MN 13 at Spring Lake Township

Location
- Country: United States
- State: Minnesota
- Counties: Scott

Highway system
- Minnesota Trunk Highway System; Interstate; US; State; Legislative; Scenic
← MN 280	→ MN 284

Minnesota State Highway 282 (MN 282) is a 7.655-mile-long (12.320 km) highway in Minnesota, which runs from its intersection with U.S. Highway 169 in Jordan and continues east to its eastern terminus at its intersection with State Highway 13 in Spring Lake Township near Prior Lake.

The route passes through the communities of Jordan, Sand Creek Township, and Spring Lake Township.

== Route description ==
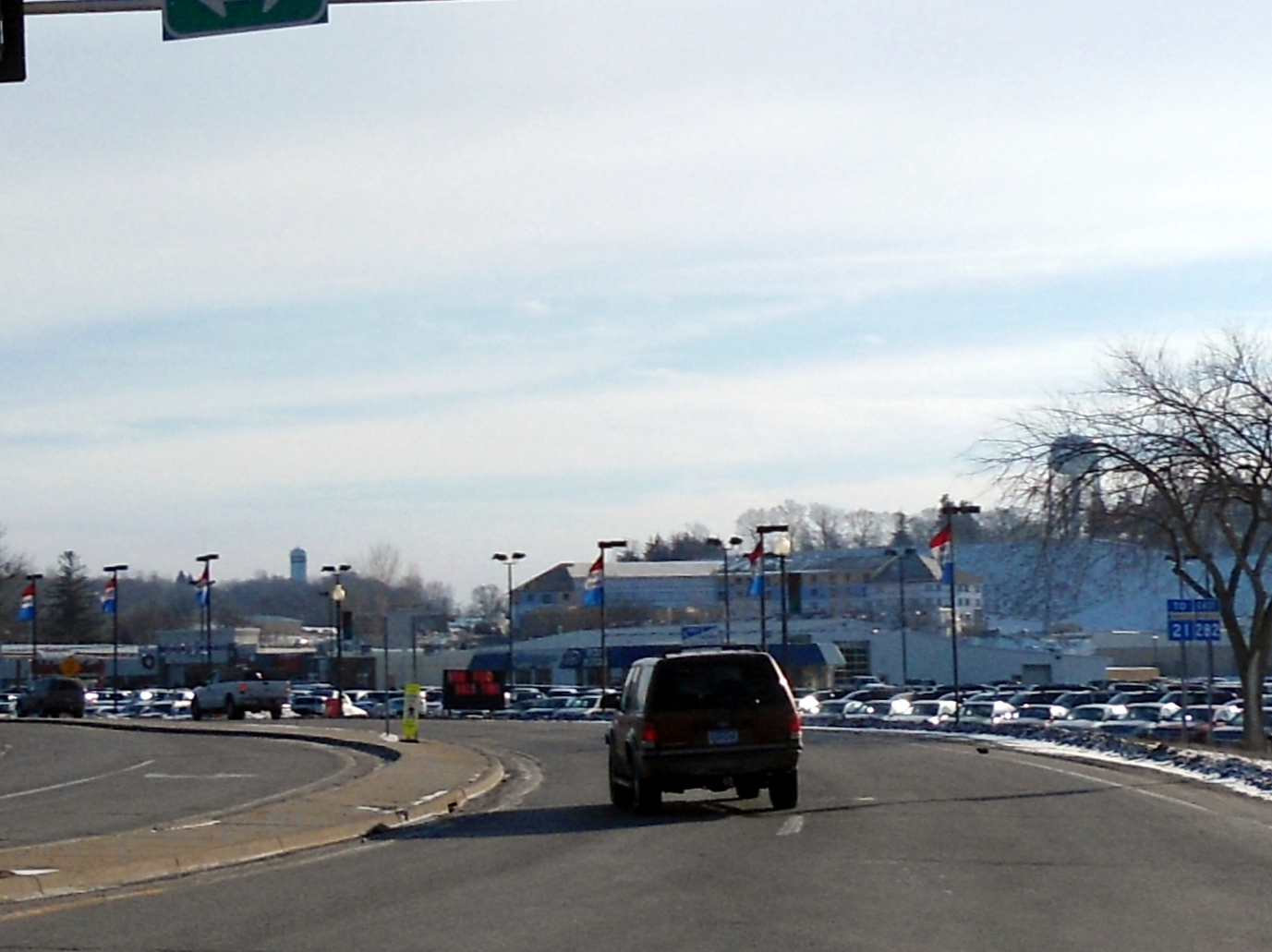
MN 282 in Jordan

Highway 282 serves as an east–west route between Jordan and Spring Lake Township near Prior Lake.

The route is also known as:

- 2nd Street in the city of Jordan
- Country Trail West in Sand Creek Township
- Country Trail East in Spring Lake Township

Highway 282 has a junction with Marystown Road (County 15) in Sand Creek Township, south of Shakopee.

The route is legally defined as Route 282 in the Minnesota Statutes.

== History ==
Highway 282 was authorized on July 1, 1949.

The route was paved in 1951.

From April 2009 to July 2009, the section of Highway 282 in the city of Jordan (2nd Street) was reconstructed between Creek Lane and Broadway Street (Highway 21). New streetlights were installed and the route was given a new pavement surface.

== Major intersections ==
The entire route is in Scott County.

Location	mi	km	Destinations	Notes
Jordan	0.000	0.000	US 169, CSAH 9 (Quaker Avenue) north	
Jordan	0.733	1.180	MN 21 (Broadway Street)	
Sand Creek Township	1.410	2.269	CSAH 10	
Sand Creek Township	4.901	7.887	CSAH 15 (Zumbro Avenue) south	
Sand Creek Township	5.913	9.516	CSAH 15 (Marystown Road) north	
Sand Creek–Spring Lake township line	6.426	10.342	CSAH 79 (Baseline Avenue)	
Spring Lake Township	7.590	12.215	CSAH 17 (Marschall Road)	
Spring Lake Township	7.714	12.414	MN 13	
1.000 mi = 1.609 km; 1.000 km = 0.621 mi
