= Spring Lake, Scott County, Minnesota =

Spring Lake
- Unincorporated community
- Location within Minnesota Location within the United States
- Coordinates: 44°42′23″N 93°27′48″W
- Country: United States
- State: Minnesota
- County: Scott
- Township: Spring Lake Township
- Elevation: 925 ft (282 m)
- Time zone: UTC-6 (Central (CST))
  - Summer (DST): UTC-5 (CDT)
- Area code: 952
- GNIS feature ID: 652475

Spring Lake is an unincorporated community in Spring Lake Township, Scott County, Minnesota, United States.

The community is located 2 miles (3.2 km) west-southwest of the city of Prior Lake near the junction of State Highway 13 (Langford Avenue), State Highway 282 (Country Trail East), and Scott County Road 17 (Marschall Road).

Spring Lake also refers to the lake within the community.
