= Spring Lake, Waushara County, Wisconsin =

Spring Lake, Wisconsin
- Unincorporated community
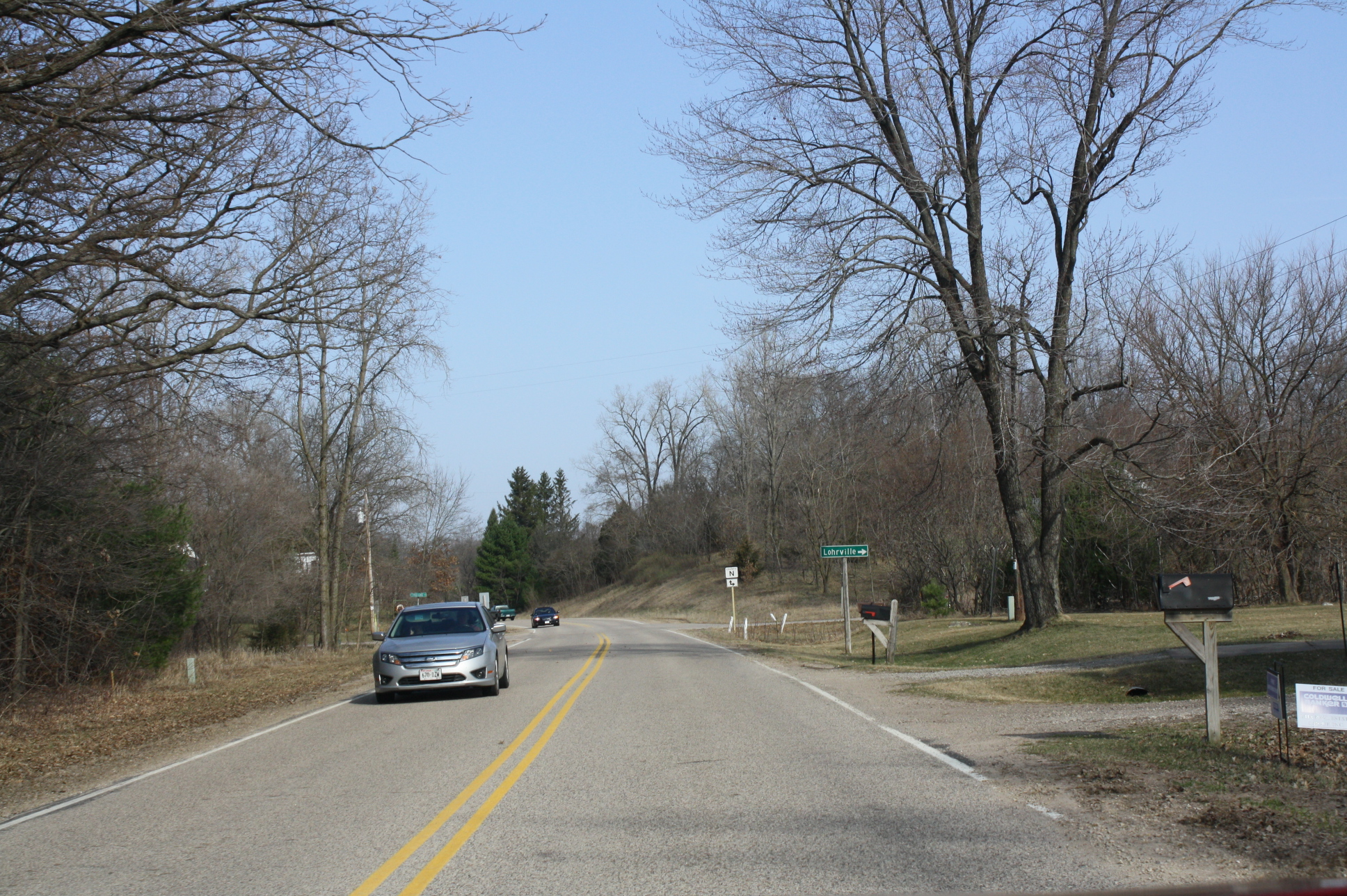
- Looking west in Spring Lake on County E

- Location within Wisconsin Location within the United States
- Coordinates: 44°01′24″N 89°09′31″W
- Country: United States
- State: Wisconsin
- County: Waushara
- Elevation: 830 ft (250 m)
- Time zone: UTC-6 (Central (CST))
  - Summer (DST): UTC-5 (CDT)
- Area code: 920
- GNIS feature ID: 1574683

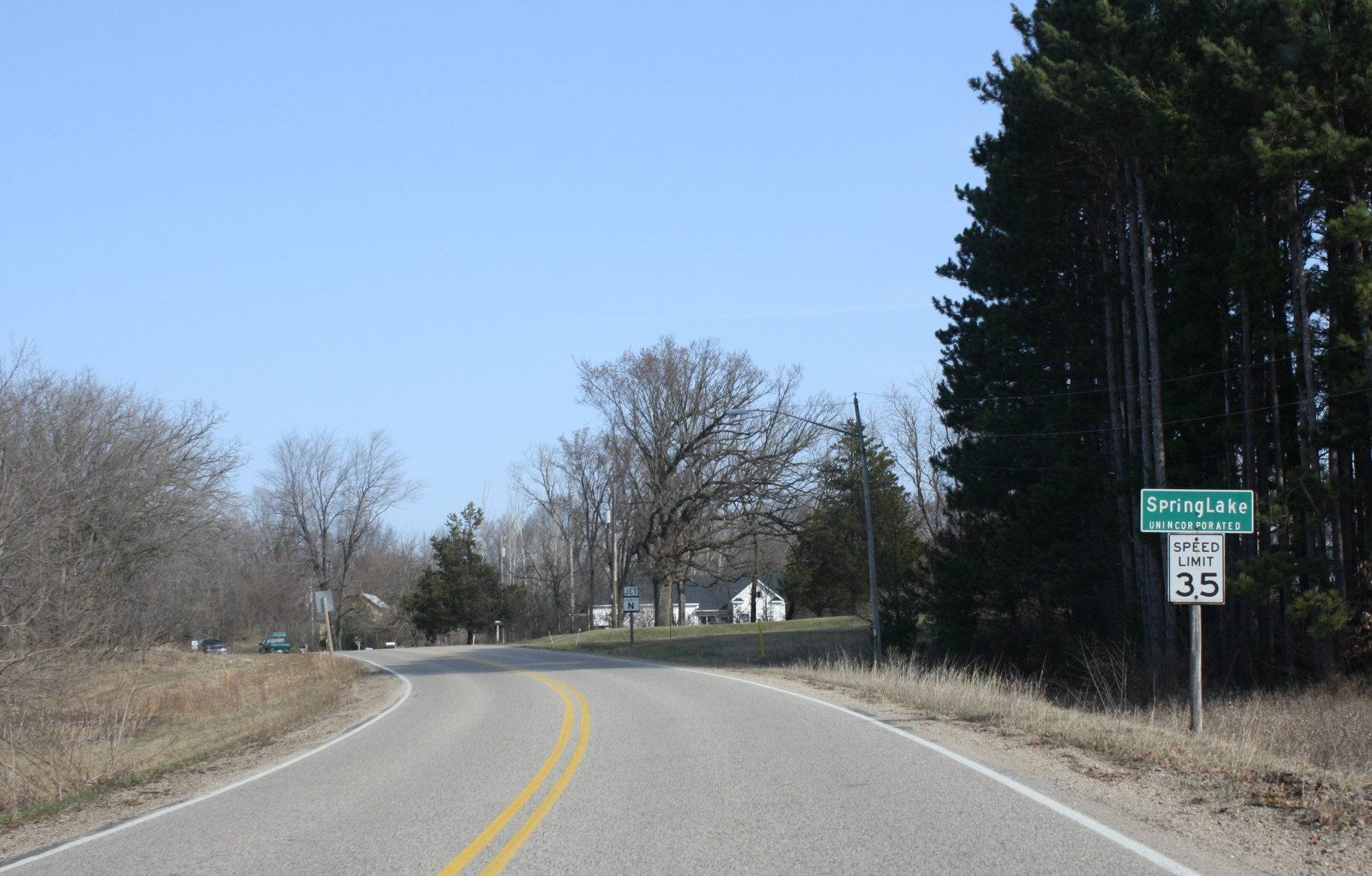
Sign

Spring Lake is an unincorporated community located in the town of Marion, Waushara County, Wisconsin, United States. It is located at the intersection of County Roads F and N.

== History ==
A post office called Spring Lake was established in 1852, and remained in operation until it was discontinued in 1923. The community took its name from nearby Spring Lake.
