= Gordon R. Thompson =

American judge

Justice of the Nevada Supreme Court (Seat E)
- In office June 5, 1961 – January 3, 1981
- Appointed by: Grant Sawyer
- Preceded by: Miles Nelson Pike
- Succeeded by: Charles E. Springer

Personal details
- Born: March 2, 1918 Reno, Nevada, U.S.
- Died: February 4, 1995 (aged 76)

Gordon R. Thompson (March 2, 1918 – February 4, 1995) was a justice of the Supreme Court of Nevada from 1961 to 1980.

Born in Reno, Nevada to Reuben C. Thompson and Mabel M. Thompson. Gordon Thompson was the younger brother of Bruce R. Thompson, who served as a federal judge from 1963 to 1978, The Thompson brothers had two sisters, Doris and Mary A. With his wife, Betty, Gordon had two daughters, Mada Susan and Robin Marie.

After graduating from Reno High School in 1936, Thompson attended the University of Nevada, Reno, the same university his brother attended. Post graduation with a bachelor's degree in 1940, Gordon, like his brother, Bruce, left Reno to attend California's Stanford Law School, where he earned his LL.B. in 1943.

From 1957 to 1959, Thompson served as one of five members of the Advisory Committee to the Supreme Court of Nevada on Rules of Civil Procedure.

In 1961, Governor Grant Sawyer appointed Thompson to the Nevada Supreme Court, making him, at 42 years old, the youngest appointee to any state supreme court in the nation at that point.

Re-elected three times, Thompson also served as chief justice several times. Among Thompson's opponents for re-election was future Chief Justice Charles Springer, a former Sawyer ally who ran against Sawyer in the 1966 primary election and made an unsuccessful bid to unseat Thompson in 1974.

During Thompson's tenure on the Court, it adopted the Nevada Rules on the Administrative Docket.

Thompson retired from the Nevada Supreme Court in 1980, citing conflicts among the court's justices.

After leaving the court, Thompson taught law at the now-defunct Old College School of Law.
