= Marion, Waushara County, Wisconsin =

Marion, Wisconsin
- Town
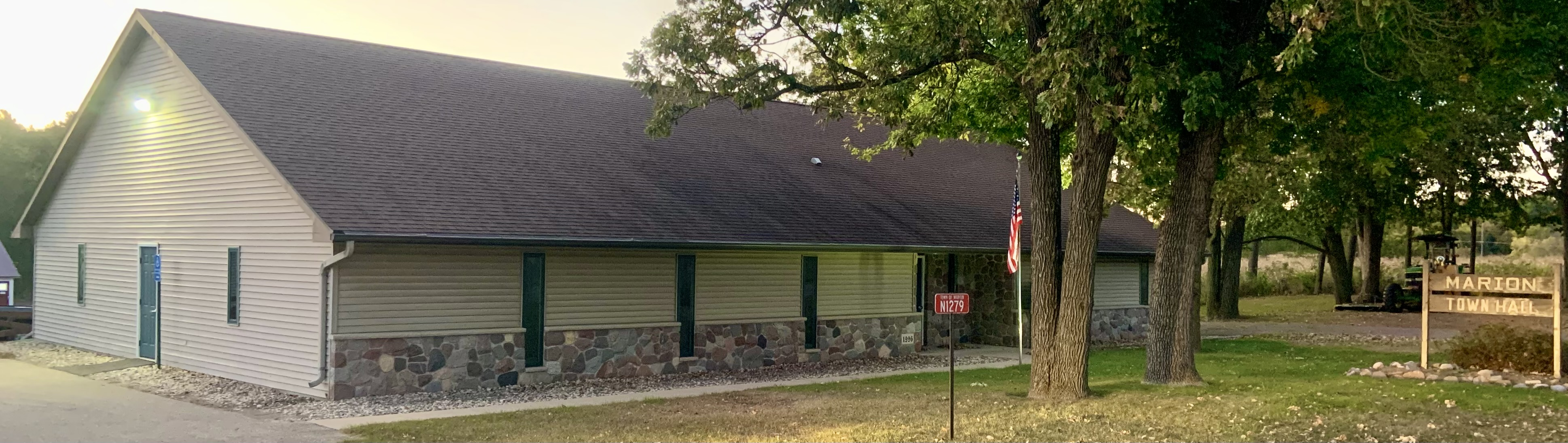
- Town hall

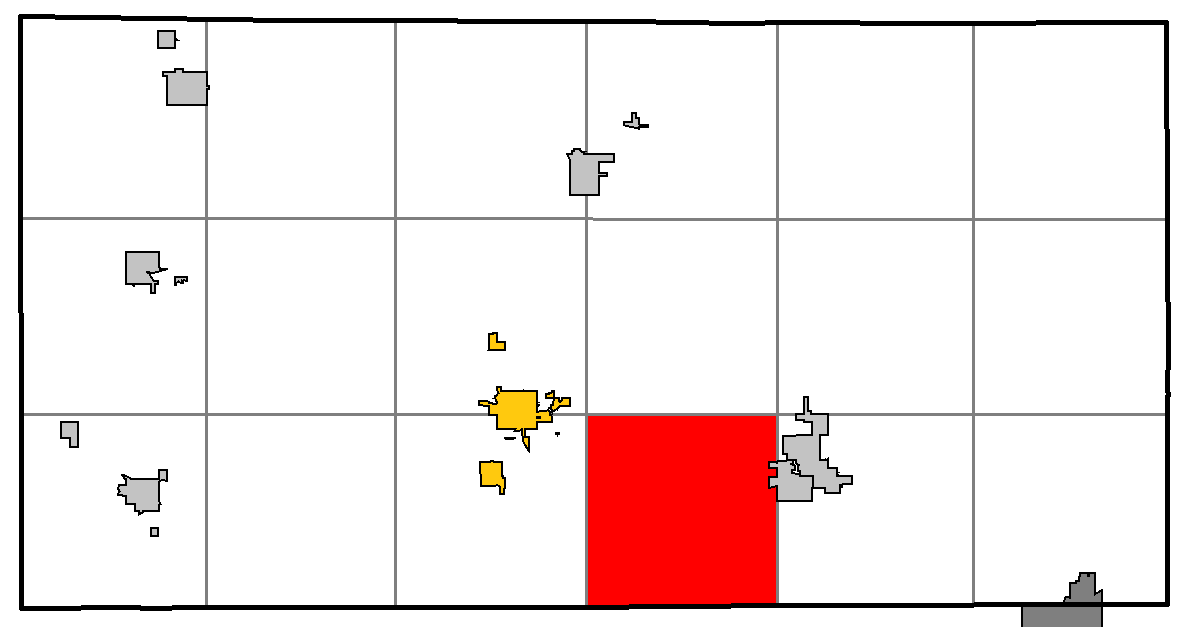
- Location of Marion, Waushara County, Wisconsin

- Location of Waushara County, Wisconsin
- Coordinates: 44°1′40″N 89°12′24″W
- Country: United States
- State: Wisconsin
- County: Waushara

Area
  - Total: 35.0 sq mi (90.6 km^{2})
  - Land: 33.6 sq mi (86.9 km^{2})
  - Water: 1.4 sq mi (3.7 km^{2})
- Elevation: 830 ft (253 m)

Population (2020)
  - Total: 2,020
  - Density: 60.2/sq mi (23.2/km^{2})
- Time zone: UTC-6 (Central (CST))
  - Summer (DST): UTC-5 (CDT)
- FIPS code: 55-49425
- GNIS feature ID: 1583658
- Website: https://townofmarionwausharawi.gov/

Marion is a town in Waushara County, Wisconsin, United States. The population was 2,020 at the 2020 census. The unincorporated communities of Silver Lake and Spring Lake are located in the town. The ghost town of Rodney was also located partially in the town.

== Geography ==
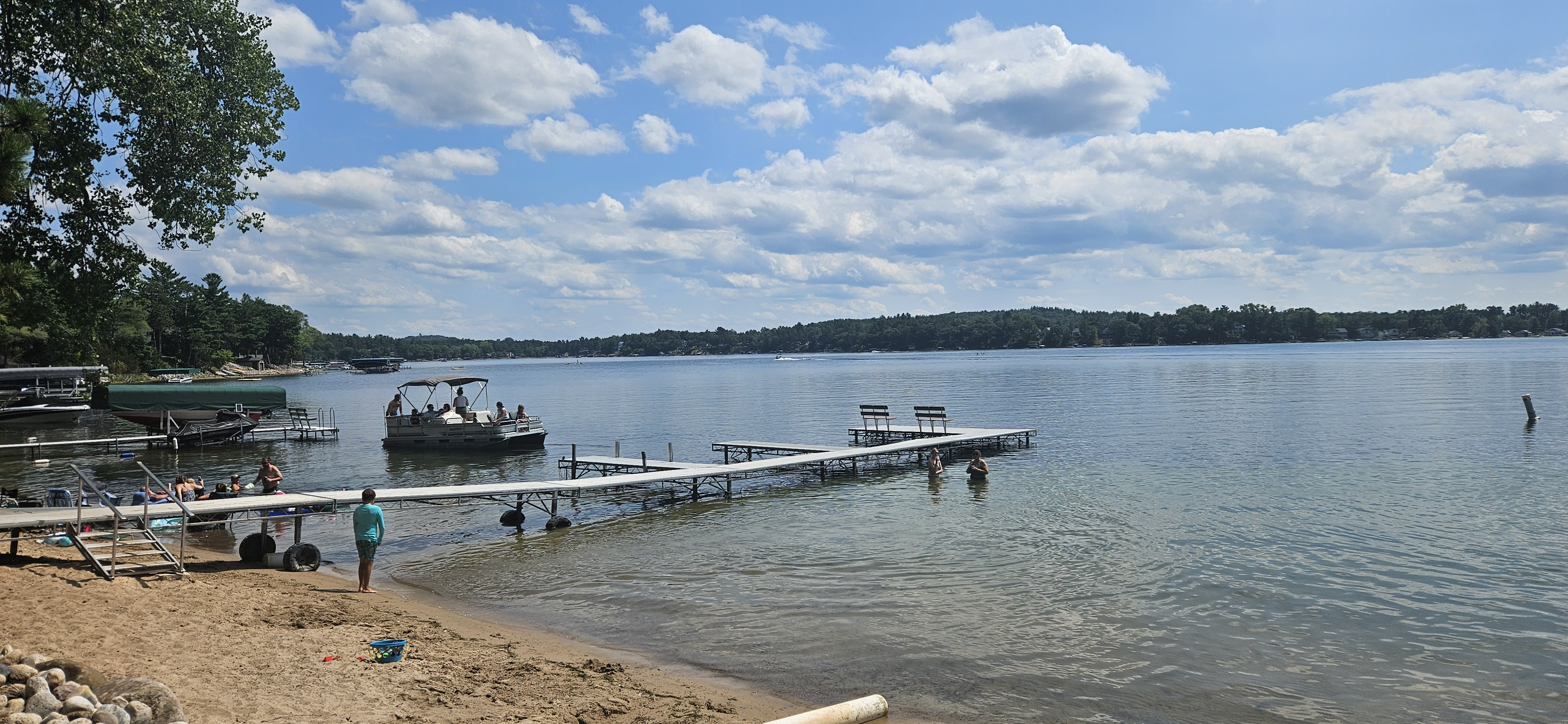
Silver Lake is located within Marion. This image was taken near the Silvercryst Resort, on the northern shore of the lake.

According to the United States Census Bureau, the town has a total area of 35.0 square miles (90.6 km^{2}), of which 33.5 square miles (86.9 km^{2}) is land and 1.4 square miles (3.7 km^{2}) (4.09%) is water.

== Demographics ==
As of the census of 2000, there were 2,065 people, 908 households, and 654 families residing in the town. The population density was 61.5 inhabitants per square mile (23.8/km^{2}). There were 1,630 housing units at an average density of 48.6 per square mile (18.8/km^{2}). The racial makeup of the town was 98.11% White, 0.10% African American, 0.44% Native American, 0.48% Asian, 0.15% from other races, and 0.73% from two or more races. Hispanic or Latino of any race were 1.31% of the population.

There were 908 households, out of which 20.4% had children under the age of 18 living with them, 64.6% were married couples living together, 3.7% had a female householder with no husband present, and 27.9% were non-families. 23.8% of all households were made up of individuals, and 12.2% had someone living alone who was 65 years of age or older. The average household size was 2.27 and the average family size was 2.65.

In the town, the population was spread out, with 19.2% under the age of 18, 4.5% from 18 to 24, 21.6% from 25 to 44, 30.5% from 45 to 64, and 24.2% who were 65 years of age or older. The median age was 48 years. For every 100 females, there were 102.1 males. For every 100 females age 18 and over, there were 99.6 males.

The median income for a household in the town was $37,534, and the median income for a family was $41,926. Males had a median income of $33,200 versus $21,422 for females. The per capita income for the town was $21,714. About 3.4% of families and 6.8% of the population were below the poverty line, including 11.8% of those under age 18 and 7.4% of those age 65 or over.

== Notable people ==
- Theophilus F. Metcalf (1816–1891), farmer and politician, lived in the town and was chairman of the Marion Town board
