= Spring (given name) =

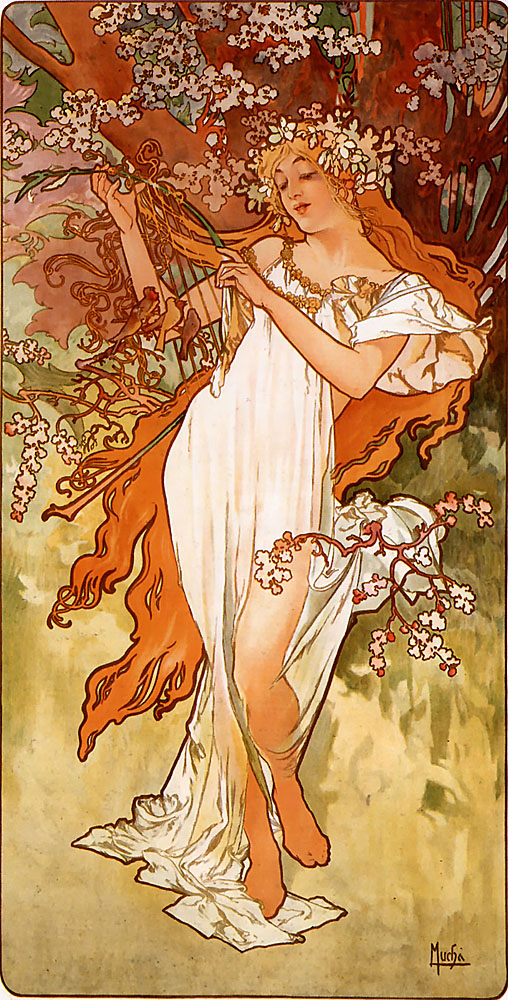
- Spring by Alfons Mucha, 1896.
- Gender: Female

Origin
- Origin: English
- Meaning: Spring

Spring is an occasionally used feminine given name derived from the English word for the season. It was among the one thousand most common names for girls in the United States between 1975 and 1979. It remains in use but has since declined in popularity. There were forty two newborn American girls given the name in 2021. Seventeen newborn American girls received the name in 2022.

== See also ==
- Spring (surname)
