= Spring River =

Spring River may refer to:

- Spring River (Arkansas), in Missouri and Arkansas, U.S.
- Spring River (Maine), U.S.
- Spring River (Missouri), in Missouri, Kansas and Oklahoma, U.S.
- Șpring (river), Romania
- Spring (Milz), a river of Thuringia, Germany

== See also ==
- Spring Creek (disambiguation)
