= Sharon Springer =

American politician

Mayor of Burbank, California
- In office December 2019 – December 2020
- Preceded by: Emily Gabel-Luddy
- Succeeded by: Bob Frutos

Personal details
- Party: Democratic
- Education: University of South Alabama (BS); Ohio State University (MS)

Sharon Springer is an American politician who served as the mayor of Burbank, California. Elected in December 2019, she succeeded Emily Gabel-Luddy.

== Early life and education ==
Springer's father served in the United States Air Force. As a child, the family moved frequently and lived in several countries, including Spain and the Kingdom of Libya.

Springer earned a Bachelor of Science degree in geography from University of South Alabama and a Master of Science degree in city and regional planning from Ohio State University. She later earned a Master Gardener certificate from University of California Cooperative Extension.

== Career ==
Prior to entering politics, Springer worked as a real estate appraiser. She was also an administrator at EngAGE, an education non-profit.

In April 2017, Springer was elected to the Burbank City Council. In April 2018, she served as the vice mayor of Burbank.

In December 2019, Springer became the mayor of Burbank.

== Personal life ==
Springer's husband was Lawrence Lee Gardner, Jr. (died 2010). Springer lives in Burbank, California.
