= Spring Lake (Alberta) =

Lake in Alberta, Canada

- Location within Alberta
- Location: Spring Lake, Alberta
- Coordinates: 53°31′02″N 114°08′27″W
- Basin countries: Canada
- Max. length: 1.2 km (0.75 mi)
- Max. width: 1.2 km (0.75 mi)
- Surface area: 80 ha (200 acres)
- Average depth: 1.9 m (6 ft 3 in)
- Max. depth: 9.1 m (30 ft)
- Surface elevation: 728 m (2,388 ft)
- References: Spring Lake

Spring Lake is a lake in Alberta. It is located within the village of Spring Lake. Both are surrounded by Parkland County.

== See also ==
- List of lakes of Alberta
