= Adolf Sprung =

German meteorologist

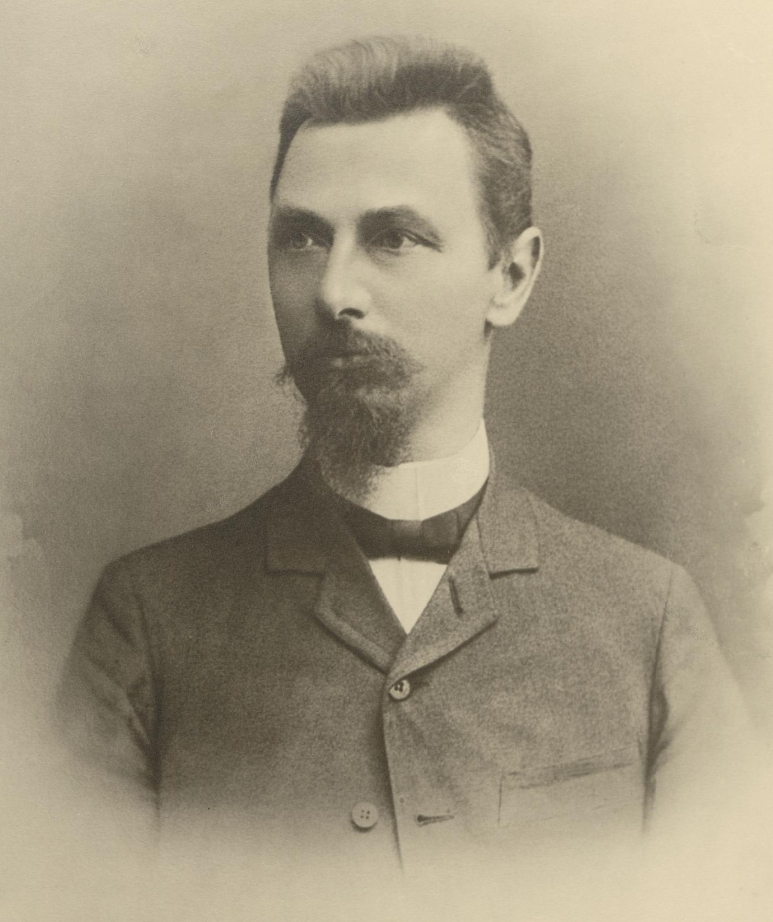

Adolf Wichard Friedrich Sprung (5 June 1848 – 16 January 1909) was a German meteorologist. He wrote a landmark textbook on theoretical meteorology in 1885, Lehrbuch der Meteorologie, in which he sought connections to underlying physical processes and observed meteorological observations unlike earlier works that were largely descriptive.

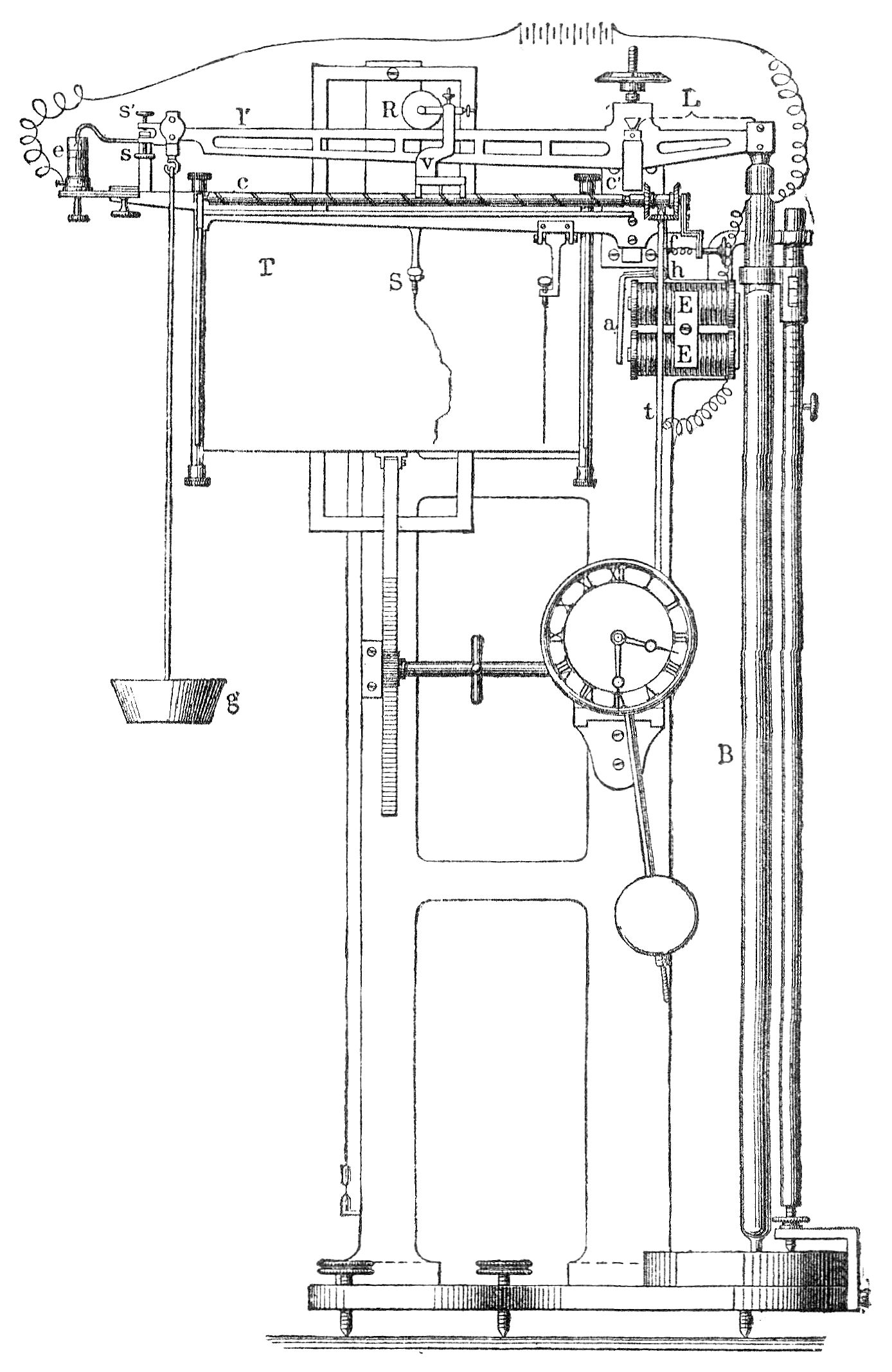
Barograph designed by Sprung and Fuess

Sprung was born in Perleberg, Kleinow where his father was a teacher. Educated at Perleberg he was interested in science and studied chemistry. During the war of 1870–71, he served as a field pharmacist at Magdeburg. In 1873 he joined Leipzig University and received a doctorate for a dissertation on fluid dynamics of salt solutions. He became an assistant in the maritime observatory (Deutsche Seewarte) in Hamburg in 1880 where he began to experiment with atmospheric measuring and recording instruments in collaboration with the instrument maker Rudolf Fuess. His innovations included a barograph driven by a weight. He collaborated with Wladimir Köppen and wrote a textbook on meteorology at the request of Georg von Neumayer. In 1886 he joined the Royal Prussian Meteorological Institute in Berlin under Wilhelm von Bezold. He headed the Potsdam meteorological and magnetic observatory from construction and opening in 1892 until his death.

He contributed to studies on the Coriolis effect in predicting the tracks of cyclones. Sprung also came up with a psychrometric formula that allows the computation of relative humidity from dry- and wet-bulb thermometer readings, originally for the one developed by Richard Assmann.

Sprung's Formula is of the form:

e = e_{w} - A.p. (t - t_{w})

where e is vapor pressure, e_{w} is saturation vapour pressure, A is a psychrometer constant, p is atmospheric pressure, t is dry-bulb temperature and t_{w} is wet-bulb temperature.
