= Springleaf (disambiguation) =

Springleaf may refer to:

- Springleaf Financial, the former name of the company OneMain Financial
- Springleaf MRT station, Singapore
- Springleaf Tower, Singapore
- Springleaf, a character from a British television sitcom Zapped
- Pat Springleaf, a character from the television series James Acaster: Repertoire, also being developed into a podcast, Springleaf
