= William Springer =

William Springer may refer to:

- William McKendree Springer (1836–1903), United States Representative from Illinois
- William L. Springer (1909–1992), U.S. Representative from Illinois
