= Robert Springer =

Robert Springer may refer to:

- Robert C. Springer (born 1942), American astronaut and test pilot
- Robert D. Springer (born 1933), United States Air Force general
