= Spring Township =

Spring Township may refer to

- Spring Township, Jefferson County, Arkansas
- Spring Township, Lincoln County, Arkansas
- Spring Township, Searcy County, Arkansas
- Spring Township, Boone County, Illinois
- Spring Township, Cherokee County, Iowa
- Spring Township, Butler County, Kansas
- Spring Township, Alfalfa County, Oklahoma
- Spring Township, Woods County, Oklahoma
- Spring Township, Snyder County, Pennsylvania
- Spring Township, Perry County, Pennsylvania
- Spring Township, Crawford County, Pennsylvania
- Spring Township, Centre County, Pennsylvania
- Spring Township, Berks County, Pennsylvania
- Spring Township, Spink County, South Dakota
