= Justice Springer =

Justice Springer may refer to:

- Charles E. Springer (1928–2019), justice of the Supreme Court of Nevada
- William McKendree Springer (1836–1903), chief justice of the United States Court of Appeals of Indian Territory
