= Geertruida H. Springer =

Dutch painter

Geertruida H. Springer (1895–1988) was a Dutch still life painter, best known for her paintings Stilleven met fles en boek, Stilleven met schedeldak en glazen potjes, and Stilleven met potje en Javaans beeldje among others. Her work is part of the permanent collections of Teyler Museum.
