= List of compositions by Léo Delibes =

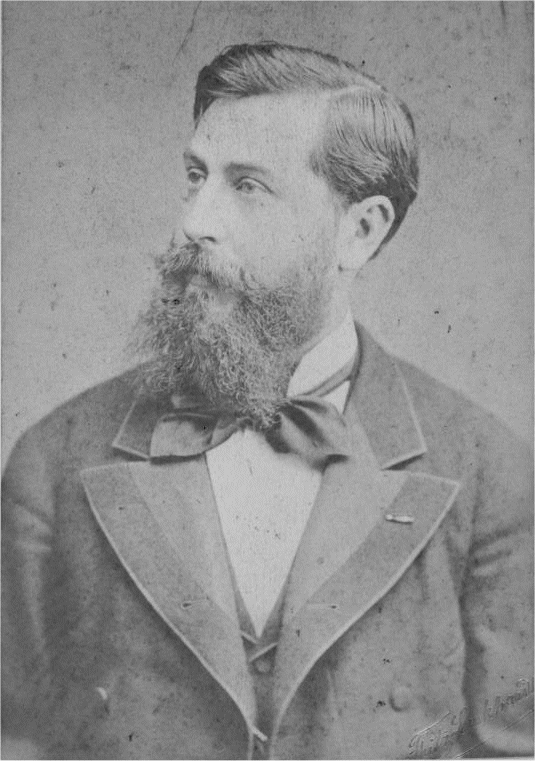
Leo Delibes

This is a list of compositions by Léo Delibes (1836–1891).

== Other vocal music ==
"Bonjour Suzon"
Ernestine Schumann-Heink (1913)

- La Marseillaise, arrangement for male voices (date unknown)
- Noël, for 3 voices
- Les prix, for 2 voices and accompaniment
- Messe brève, for two children's voices and organ
- C’est Dieu, for chorus
- En avant, for 3 voices
- Le dimanche, for 2 or 3 voices
- Les norvégiennes, for 2 female voices and accompaniment
- Les nymphes de bois, for 2 female voices and accompaniment
- La nuit de Noël, for 4 male voices, 1859
- Pastorale, for 4 male voices, 1865
- Alger, cantate, for soprano, chorus and orchestra, 1865
- Hymne de Noël, for chorus, 1865
- Les lansquenets, for 4 male voices, 1866
- Les chants lorrains, for 4 male voices, 1866
- Marche de soldats, for 4 male voices, 1866
- Avril, for chorus, 1866
- Au printemps, for 3 voices, 1867
- Chant de la paix, for 4 male voices, or 6 mixed voices, or 3 to 4 voices, 1867
- Trianon, for 4 male voices, 1868
- La cour des miracles, for 4 male voices, 1868
- Les filles de Cadix, for solo voice, 1874
- Les abeilles, for 3 voices, 1874
- Les pifferari, for 3 voices, 1874
- L’écheyeau de fil, for 3 voices, 1874
- Le pommier, for 3 voices, 1877
- La mort d’Orphée, lyrical scene for tenor and orchestra, 1877
- Voyage enfantin, for 3 voices, 1884
- Bonjour Suzon (Good Morning, Sue)

== Ballets ==
- La source, ou Naila in 3 acts, 1866
- Coppélia, ou La fille aux yeux d’émail in 3 acts, 1870
- Sylvia, ou La nymphe de Diane in 3 acts, 1876 (piano arrangement, 1876; orchestral suite, 1880)

== Miscellaneous ==
- La tradition prologue in verse form, 1864
- Valse ou pas de fleurs for Adolphe Adam's Le corsaire (1867)
- Le roi s’amuse, six airs de danse dans le style ancien, dances, 1882 (piano arrangement 1882)
