= Spring (surname) =

The surname Spring is shared by:

- Amos Spring (1880–1958), English cricketer
- Antoine Frédéric Spring (1814–1872), Belgian physician and botanist
- Arthur Spring (born 1976), Irish Labour Party politician
- Bryan Spring (born 1945), British jazz drummer
- Charles A. Spring (1800–1892), American merchant and religious leader
- Christopher Spring (born 1984), Canadian bobsledder
- Cecil Spring Rice (1859–1918), British diplomat
- Dick Spring (born 1950), Irish businessman and politician
- Diel Spring (born 2000), Saint Vincent and the Grenadines footballer
- Dryden Spring (born 1939), New Zealand businessman
- George E. Spring (1859–1917), New York state senator
- Howard Spring (1889–1965), Welsh author
- Jack Spring (1933–2015), American baseball pitcher
- Jessica Spring, American letterpress printer and book artist
- Marianna Spring (born 1996), British broadcast journalist
- Richard Spring, Baron Risby (born 1946), British politician
- Rudi Spring (1962–2025), German composer, pianist and academic
- Samuel Spring (1746–1819), American Revolutionary War chaplain and Congregationalist minister.
- Samuel N. Spring (1875–1952), American silviculturist and academic administrator.
- Sherwood C. Spring (born 1944), United States Army officer and astronaut
- Stephanie Spring (born 1957), British businesswoman and media executive
- Tom Spring (1795–1851), English bare-knuckle fighter and English heavy weight champion
- Walthère Victor Spring (1848–1911), Belgian chemist

== See also ==
- Spring family
- Spring baronets
- Spring (disambiguation)
