= Antonio Alamo Jr. =

American physician

Anthony Alamo Jr.
- Born: Anthony Alamo Jr. c. 1964; Reno, Nevada, USA
- Occupations: Physician, politician

Anthony Alamo Jr. is an American physician and politician who served as the chairman of the Nevada Gaming Commission from 2014 to 2020. He is also the founder of the Alamo Medical Clinic in Henderson, Nevada, and was previously chairman of the Nevada State Athletic Commission and, before that, chairman of its Medical Advisory Board.

== Early life and education ==
Alamo was born in Reno, Nevada and raised in Las Vegas. His father was an immigrant from Cuba and worked his way up from a janitor in Reno to president of the Mandalay Bay Resorts Group before it was sold to MGM Resorts International. Alamo attended Chaparral High School in Las Vegas, later graduating with a bachelor's degree in chemistry from the University of Nevada, Las Vegas in 1987. Alamo earned his medical degree from the University of Southern California School of Medicine in 1991. Alamo completed his residency at the Los Angeles County-USC General Hospital and Huntington Hospitals.

== Career ==
Alamo founded the Alamo Medical Clinic in 1994 in Henderson, Nevada and remains Medical Director. He was previously Chief of Staff at Sunrise Hospital and Children's Medical Center (2002–2004) and St. Rose San Martin Hospital (2006–2009).

Between 2001 and 2007, Alamo was a member of the Nevada State Athletic Commission. While there, he sanctioned the Oscar De La Hoya vs. Floyd Mayweather Jr. fight and sat on the board that denied Mike Tyson his boxing license in 2002. He also served as chairman to the Medical Advisory Board and helped pass the requirement for athletes to be tested for hepatitis. In 2008, Governor Jim Gibbons appointed him to the Nevada Gaming Commission and, in 2014, Governor Brian Sandoval appointed him chairman. He was the first non-attorney to hold this position. In 2020, he resigned before his third term ended so he could focus on the COVID-19 pandemic. He is the first person in Nevada history to have served on both the gaming and athletic commissions. In November 2022, he was chosen by incoming Governor Joe Lombardo as part of his transition team.

Alamo previously sat on the board for the community bank, Bank of George, and has volunteered with the Las Vegas Metropolitan Police Department as a tactical physician. He has undergone specialized tactical and trauma medical training and has collaborated with the SWAT team since the late 1990s. He was given a Medal of Unit Valor for Valorous Conduct, the first time this award had been given to a civilian.

== Personal life ==
Alamo has been a licensed pilot since the age of 19. He is married and has one son.
