= Spring (application) =

E-commerce platform

- Type: Private
- Industry: M-commerce E-commerce, Retail
- Founded: 2013; 13 years ago
- Founders: Alan Tisch, Ara Katz, David Tisch, Octavian Costache
- Defunct: 2019
- Headquarters: New York City
- Website: www.shopspring.com

Spring was an E-commerce platform that connected retailers and shoppers using a direct-to-consumer sales model. The company, headquartered in New York City, launched its mobile marketplace on August 14, 2014. It raised over $30 million in venture funding by 2015. The platform was recognized by Apple as one of the Best apps of 2014. In October 2018, the membership service ShopRunner announced the acquisition of Spring and closed the platform in 2019.

== History ==
Spring was founded in 2013 by the brothers Alan and David Tisch, former Google employees, Octavian Costache, and Ara Katz. The company originally operated as Jello Labs, and announced the name change to Spring in July 2014 when it raised $7.5 million in Series A round funding led by Thrive Capital. The company chose the name Spring to mirror the shopping area on Spring Street in SoHo, Manhattan. The app was officially launched on August 14, 2014, with 250 brands selling their products on the iPhone-based platform. In April 2015, Spring raised $25 million in a Series B round of venture funding led by Box Group that included Yuri Milner, Google Ventures and Thrive Capital. Spring launched a desktop version of the shopping platform in November 2015.

In March 2016, Spring launched a "personal shopping assistant" on Facebook's bot store. In December 2016, Spring had 1,300 brands on the platform including Marc Jacobs, Helmut Lang and Coach. Spring raised $65 million in a Series C round of venture funding led by Fidelity Investments that included previous investors in May 2017. As of May 2017, Spring sold items from over 1,500 retail brands and had a gross value of over $100 million.

== Operations ==
Spring was launched using a mobile first or m-commerce strategy and the company operated without a website until 2015. It did not stock any inventory directly, and instead used a drop shipping methodology to fulfill orders. The site also curated personalized collections and offered users brand recommendations.
