= Spring Lake (Dakota County, Minnesota) =

Lake in the state of Minnesota, United States

- Location within Minnesota
- Location: Dakota County, Minnesota
- Coordinates: 44°45′39″N 92°57′46″W
- Type: lake

Spring Lake is a lake in Dakota County, in the U.S. state of Minnesota.

Spring Lake was named from the fact there are many springs near it.

== See also ==
- List of lakes in Minnesota
