= Finn Coren =

Background information
- Born: 28 March 1961
- Died: 11 November 2026 (aged 65)
- Occupations: Singer-songwriter; multi-instrumentalist
- Years active: 1985–2026

Finn Coren (28 March 1961 – 11 November 2026) was a Norwegian singer-songwriter and multi-instrumentalist. He is best known for his series of albums setting to music the lyrics of William Blake, W. B. Yeats and Olav H. Hauge.

Coren's first album The Echoing Green comprised songs written and composed by him, though the title was taken from Blake. His second album Love's Loneliness was released in 1990, and was a setting of Yeats songs, from Words for Music, Perhaps. Two albums setting to music the words of Blake were released in 1997 and 1998. His next project, Lovecloud, was dedicated to his heroes, Blake, Yeats and John Lennon, but the songs were written by Coren himself.

Cancer put a temporary stop to Coren's career. In 2008, Coren returned with a double-album setting to music the lyrics of the Norwegian poet Olav H. Hauge. I draumar fær du was Coren's first album in Norwegian, and the first part of a series devoted to Nordic poets. In 2011, he released the album Mitt hjerte where he puts music to poems and texts by the Norwegian poet, novelist and screenplay author Jens Bjørneboe.

Coren died on 11 November 2026, at the age of 65.

== Discography ==
- Finn Coren: The Echoing Green (Luna Music, 1989)
- A Full Moon In March: Love’s Loneliness (Kirkelig kulturverksted, 1990)
- Finn Coren The Blake Project: Spring (Bard, 1997)
- Finn Coren The Blake Project: Spring: The Appendix (Bard, 1998)
- Finn Coren: Lovecloud (Bard, 1999)
- Finn Coren: I draumar fær du (Bard, 2008)
- Finn Coren: Mitt hjerte: Dikt av Jens Bjørneboe (Bard, 2011)
- Finn Coren: På jorden et sted - Utvalgte nordiske dikt (Bard, 2015)
