= Printemps (ballet) =

Printemps is a ballet made on New York City Ballet by Lorca Massine to Debussy's eponymous music from 1887. The premiere took place on January 13, 1972, at the New York State Theater, Lincoln Center.

== Original cast ==
- Violette Verdy
- Christine Redpath
- Virginia Stuart

== Reviews ==
- NY Times review by Clive Barnes, January 16, 1972
