= Spring Lake Township, Tazewell County, Illinois =

Coordinates: 40°29′09″N 89°47′31″W

Spring Lake Township
- Township
- Location in Tazewell County
- Country: United States
- State: Illinois
- County: Tazewell
- Established: November 6, 1849

Area
  - Total: 65.54 sq mi (169.7 km^{2})
  - Land: 62.68 sq mi (162.3 km^{2})
  - Water: 2.86 sq mi (7.4 km^{2}) 4.36%

Population (2010)
  - Estimate (2016): 1,855
  - Density: 30.1/sq mi (11.6/km^{2})
- Time zone: UTC-6 (CST)
  - Summer (DST): UTC-5 (CDT)
- FIPS code: 17-179-72130

Spring Lake Township is located in Tazewell County, Illinois. As of the 2010 census, its population was 1,887 and it contained 887 housing units.

== Geography ==
According to the 2010 census, the township has a total area of 65.54 square miles (169.7 km^{2}), of which 62.68 square miles (162.3 km^{2}) (or 95.64%) is land and 2.86 square miles (7.4 km^{2}) (or 4.36%) is water.

== Demographics ==
Historical population
Census	Pop.	Note	%±
2016 (est.)	1,855
U.S. Decennial Census
