= Spring (Milz) =

River in Thuringia, Germany

Location
- Country: Germany
- State: Thuringia

Physical characteristics
- Mouth
  - location: Milz
  - coordinates: 50°22′34″N 10°32′32″E

Basin features
- Progression: Milz→ Franconian Saale→ Main→ Rhine→ North Sea

Spring is a small river of Thuringia, Germany. It flows into the river Milz in the village Milz.

== See also ==
- List of rivers of Thuringia
