= Charles E. Springer =

American judge (1928–2019)

Charles Edward Springer

Justice of the Nevada Supreme Court (Seat E)
- In office 1981–1997
- Preceded by: Gordon R. Thompson
- Succeeded by: Deborah Agosti

24th Nevada Attorney General
- In office 1962–1962
- Governor: Grant Sawyer
- Preceded by: Roger D. Foley
- Succeeded by: Harvey Dickerson

Personal details
- Born: February 20, 1928 Reno, Nevada
- Died: February 19, 2019 (aged 90)
- Education: Georgetown University

Charles Edward Springer (February 20, 1928 – February 19, 2019) was a justice of the Supreme Court of Nevada from 1981 to 1997. a two-time candidate for Governor of Nevada, Springer also served as the state's attorney general. Since 2007, Springer has worked at the law firm Kermitt Waters.

== Early life and education ==
Springer graduated from the University of Nevada, Reno in 1950 and received his law degree from Georgetown University in 1953.

Springer worked for the Nevada Legislature in 1954 and later that year ran unsuccessfully for Reno city attorney. He later became Gabbs city attorney. In 1955, he started his own law practice. Springer was active in the state Democratic Party, serving as state party chair and a Democratic national committeeman.

== Career ==
Springer was appointed Attorney General in 1962 by Governor Grant Sawyer, but then challenged Sawyer in the 1966 Democratic party primary. He later ran as an independent for Governor again in 1970. In 1973, he became the Juvenile Court master in Washoe County.

In 1974, he challenged Justice Gordon Thompson for a seat on the Supreme Court and lost. He ran again in 1980, beating District Judge Paul Goldman and was reelected unopposed in 1986 and 1992.

Political offices
| Preceded by Gordon R. Thompson | Justice of the Supreme Court of Nevada; 1981–1997 | Succeeded by Deborah Agosti |
