= Spring Lake (Waushara County, Wisconsin) =

Lake in the state of Wisconsin, United States

- Location within Wisconsin Location within the United States
- Location: Waushara County, Wisconsin
- Coordinates: 44°00′40″N 89°09′39″W
- Type: lake
- Basin countries: United States
- Surface area: 50 acres (20 ha)
- Max. depth: 37 ft (11 m)
- Surface elevation: 787 ft (240 m)

Spring Lake is a lake in Waushara County, Wisconsin, in the United States.

Spring Lake was named from the many springs which flow into the lake.

== See also ==
- List of lakes in Wisconsin
