= Spring Lake (Scott County, Minnesota) =

Lake in the state of Minnesota, United States

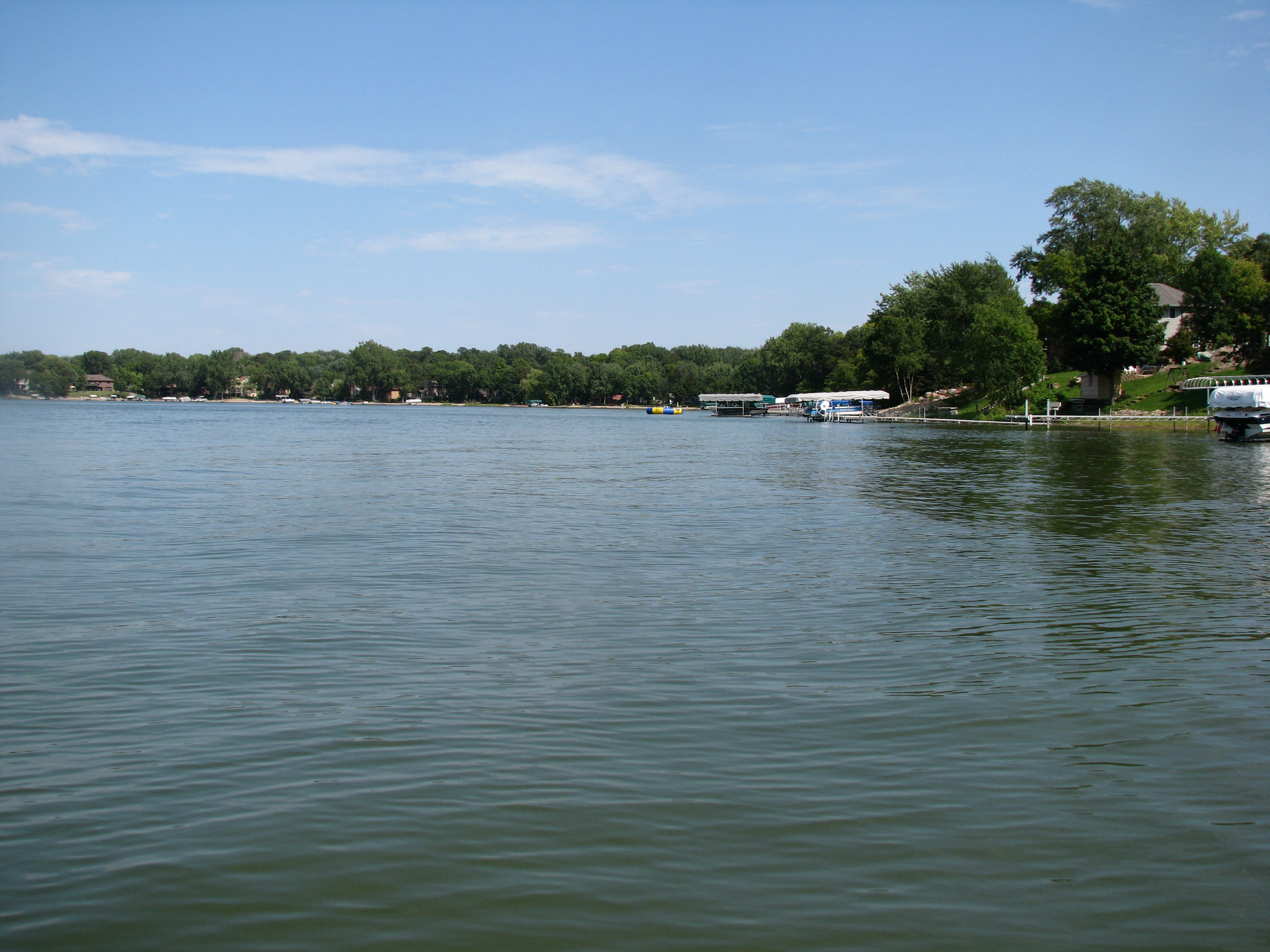
- Spring Lake

- Location within Minnesota Location within the United States
- Location: Scott County, Minnesota
- Coordinates: 44°42′6″N 93°28′23″W
- Type: lake

Spring Lake is a lake in Scott County, in the U.S. state of Minnesota.

Spring Lake was so named from the fact it is fed by a spring.

== See also ==
- List of lakes in Minnesota
