= Jurgenne H. Primavera =

Filipina marine scientist

Jurgenne Honculada-Primavera (born February 22, 1947) is a widely cited Filipina marine scientist. For her research in mangrove ecosystem conservation she was honored as one of Time magazine's Heroes of the Environment for 2008. She was inducted into the National Academy of Science and Technology (NAST) in 2015.

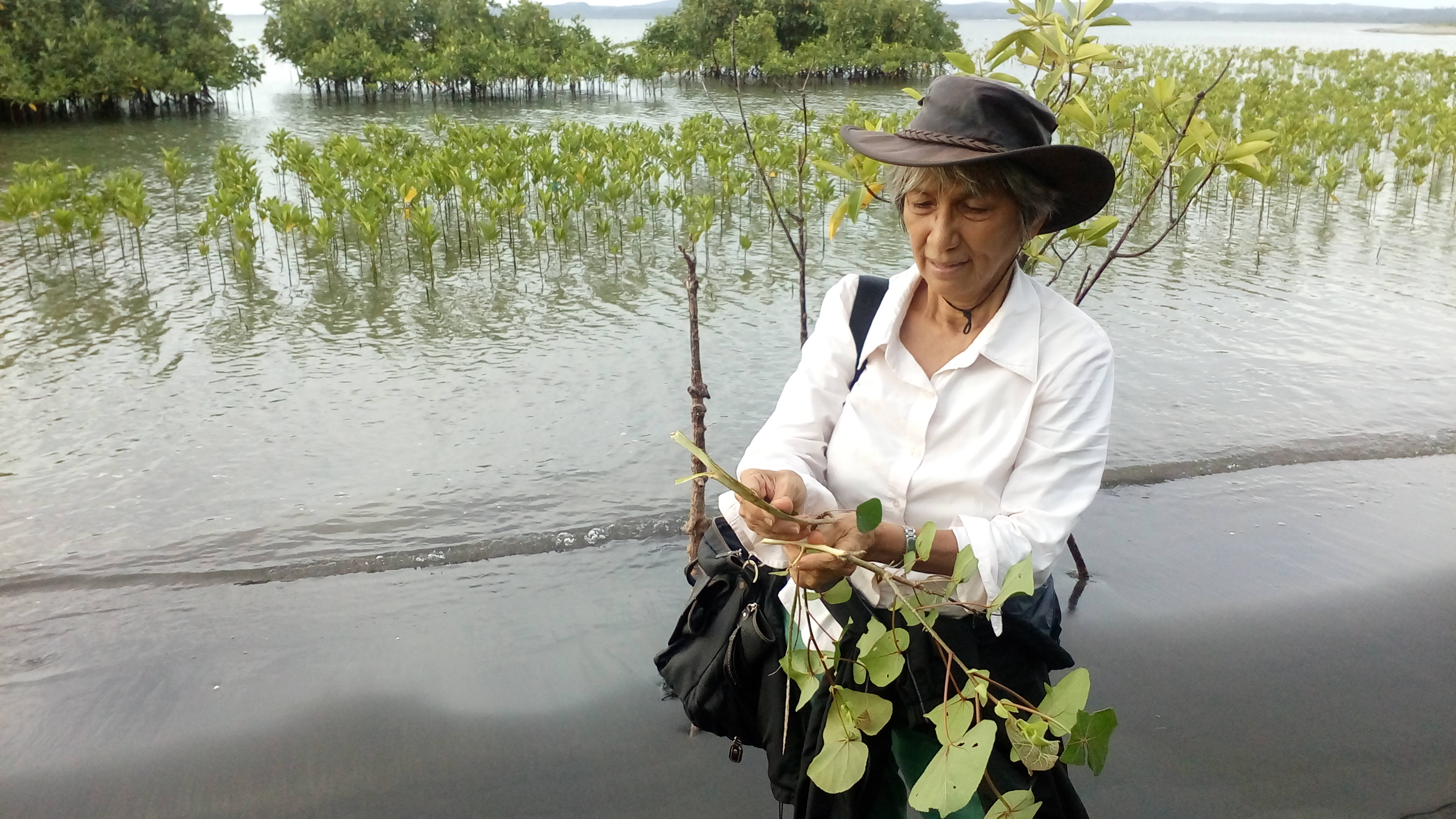
Dr. Jurgenne H. Primavera

== Biography ==
Jurgenne and her twin sister, Georgette, were born on February 22, 1947 in Mindanao, in the Philippines.

Primavera completed a BS in zoology from the University of the Philippines Diliman in 1966, an MA in zoology from Indiana University Bloomington in 1969, and a PhD in marine science from the University of the Philippines in 1996. For nearly a decade she taught biology and zoology at Mindanao State University, until a growing insurgency caused her to take a research position with the Aquaculture Department of the Southeast Asian Fisheries Development Center in the safer Visayas where she retired as scientist emerita in 2007.

Primavera was conferred a PhD honoris causa by Stockholm University in 2004 for her scientific work that shows the role of mangroves as vital recruitment areas for marine life, and that destruction of mangrove areas associated with pond farming of shrimp may have far-reaching negative socioeconomic implications. In 2005, she received a Pew Fellowship in marine conservation. In 2015, she was inducted as academician of the National Academy of Science and Technology (NAST). In 2022, she was elected as a fellow of The World Academy of Sciences. She currently serves as the chief mangrove scientific adviser for the Zoological Society of London.

== Books ==
- Primavera, Jurgenne H.; Apud, Florentino D. (1976). Manual of operations, sugpo pond culture. Iloilo, Philippines: SEAFDEC Aquaculture Department. OCLC 4313647.
- Primavera, J. H.; Sabada, R. B.; Labata, M. J. H. L.; Altamirano, J. P. (2004). Handbook of Mangroves in the Philippines, Panay (PDF). Iloilo, Philippines: SEAFDEC Aquaculture Department. ISBN 971-8511-65-2.
- Bagarinao, T. U.; Primavera, Jurgenne H. (2005). Code of practice for sustainable use of mangrove ecosystems for aquaculture in Southeast Asia. Iloilo, Philippines: SEAFDEC Aquaculture Department. ISBN 971-8511-76-8.
- Primavera, Jurgenne H.; Sabada, Resurreccion B. (2012). Beach forest species and mangrove associates in the Philippines. Iloilo, Philippines: SEAFDEC Aquaculture Department. ISBN 978-971-9931-01-0.
- Primavera, J. H.; Sabada, R. B.; Labata, M. J. H. L.; Altamirano, J. P. (2016). Mangroves and Beach Forest Species in the Philippines. Laguna, Philippines: Ecosystems Research and Development Bureau, Department of Environment and Natural Resources. ISBN 978-971-8831-49-6.
