= Spring Lake Township, Scott County, Minnesota =

Spring Lake Township, Minnesota
- Township
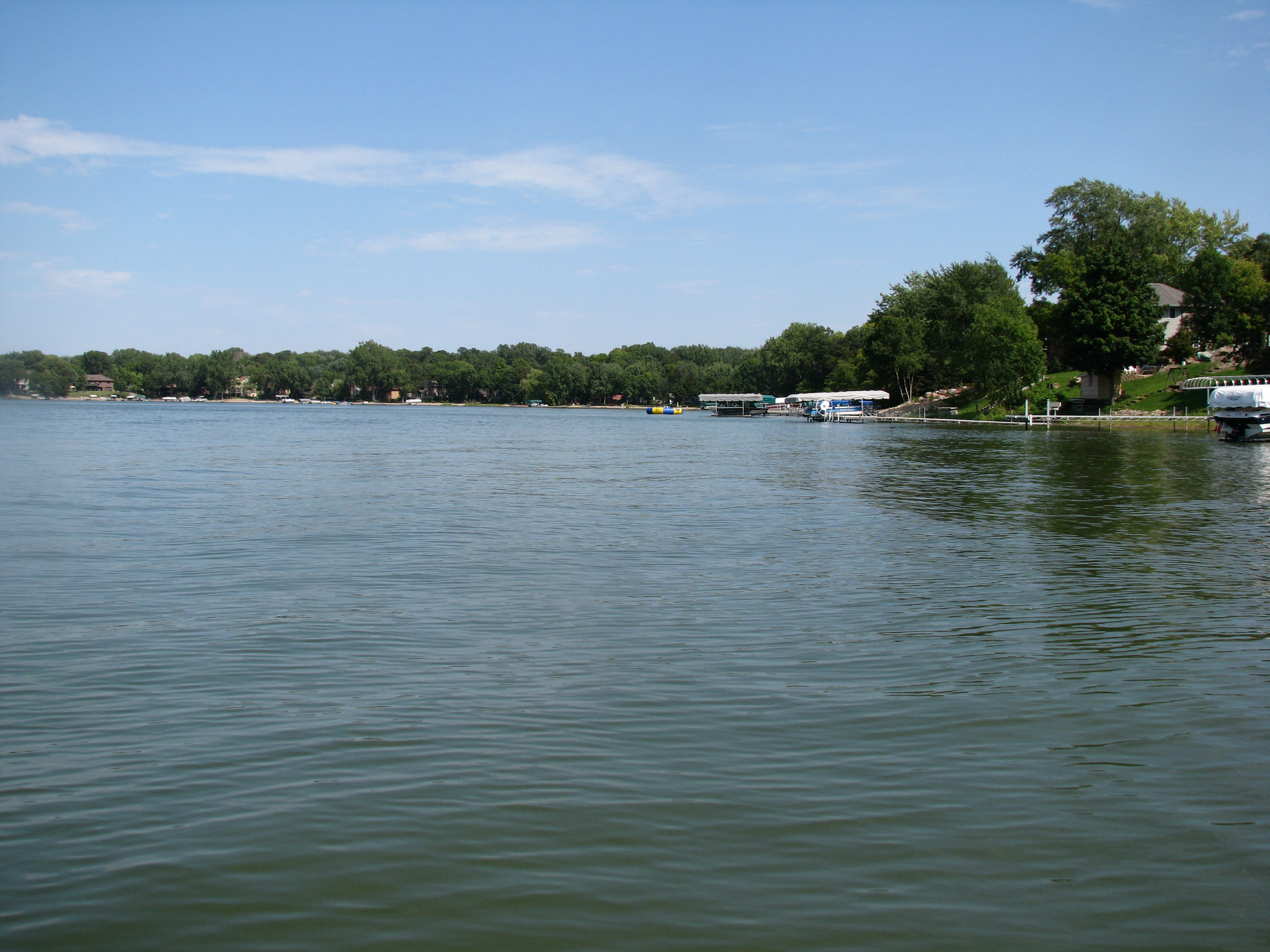
- On the shores of Spring Lake

- Location within the state of Minnesota Spring Lake Township, Minnesota (the United States)
- Coordinates: 44°40′8″N 93°27′46″W
- Country: United States
- State: Minnesota
- County: Scott

Area
  - Total: 32.0 sq mi (83.0 km^{2})
  - Land: 30.3 sq mi (78.5 km^{2})
  - Water: 1.8 sq mi (4.6 km^{2})
- Elevation: 1,027 ft (313 m)

Population (2020)
  - Total: 3,464
- Time zone: UTC-6 (Central (CST))
  - Summer (DST): UTC-5 (CDT)
- FIPS code: 27-61978
- GNIS feature ID: 0665676

Spring Lake Township is a township in Scott County, Minnesota, United States. The population was 3,464 at the 2020 census.

== History ==
Spring Lake Township was organized in 1858, and named after Spring Lake.

== Geography ==
According to the United States Census Bureau, the township has a total area of 32.0 square miles (83.0 km^{2}), of which 30.3 square miles (78.5 km^{2}) is land and 1.8 square miles (4.6 km^{2}) (5.49%) is water.

== Demographics ==
As of the census of 2000, there were 3,681 people, 1,217 households, and 1,023 families residing in the township. The population density was 121.5 inhabitants per square mile (46.9/km^{2}). There were 1,254 housing units at an average density of 41.4 per square mile (16.0/km^{2}). The racial makeup of the township was 98.23% White, 0.30% African American, 0.33% Native American, 0.35% Asian, 0.14% Pacific Islander, 0.05% from other races, and 0.60% from two or more races. Hispanic or Latino of any race were 0.60% of the population.

There were 1,217 households, out of which 43.5% had children under the age of 18 living with them, 78.0% were married couples living together, 3.1% had a female householder with no husband present, and 15.9% were non-families. 11.3% of all households were made up of individuals, and 3.0% had someone living alone who was 65 years of age or older. The average household size was 3.02 and the average family size was 3.29.

In the township the population was spread out, with 30.8% under the age of 18, 5.7% from 18 to 24, 31.4% from 25 to 44, 26.6% from 45 to 64, and 5.5% who were 65 years of age or older. The median age was 37 years. For every 100 females, there were 107.7 males. For every 100 females age 18 and over, there were 107.7 males.

The median income for a household in the township was $80,141, and the median income for a family was $83,736. Males had a median income of $52,388 versus $36,313 for females. The per capita income for the township was $29,562. About 1.3% of families and 1.5% of the population were below the poverty line, including none of those under age 18 and 14.6% of those age 65 or over.
