= List of justices of the Washington Supreme Court =

Following is a list of justices of the Washington Supreme Court.

== Current justices ==
Seat	Name	Born	Start	Chief term	Term ends	Mandatory retirement (Note: Justices must retire by the end of the calendar year (December 31) in which they attain the age of 75.)	Appointer	Law school
7	Debra L. Stephens, Chief Justice	1965 (age 60–61)	January 1, 2008	2025–present 2020–2021	2026	2040	Christine Gregoire (D)	Gonzaga
4	Charles W. Johnson, Associate Chief Justice	March 16, 1951 (age 75)	January 14, 1991	–	2026	2026	—N/a (Note: Took office after being elected in a nonpartisan election.)	Seattle
8	Steven González	October 1, 1963 (age 63)	January 1, 2012	2021–2025	2030	2038	Christine Gregoire (D)	UC Berkeley
9	Sheryl Gordon McCloud	October 5, 1955 (age 71)	January 9, 2013	–	2030	2030	—N/a	USC
3	Raquel Montoya-Lewis	April 3, 1968 (age 58)	January 6, 2020	–	2026	2043	Jay Inslee (D)	UW
6	Helen Whitener	1964 (age 61–62)	April 24, 2020	–	2028	2039	Jay Inslee (D)	Seattle
2	Sal Mungia	February 19, 1959 (age 67)	January 13, 2025	–	2030	2034	—N/a	Georgetown
1	Colleen Melody	1982 (age 43–44)	January 1, 2026	–	2026	2057	Bob Ferguson (D)	UW
5	Theo Angelis	1972 (age 53–54)	April 4, 2026	–	2026	2047	Bob Ferguson (D)	Yale

== Notable territorial judges ==
- Orange Jacobs, 1869–1875
- Obadiah B. McFadden, 1854–1861
- Ethelbert P. Oliphant, 1861–1865
- William Strong, 1858–1861
- George Turner, 1885–1888
- Francis A. Chenoweth 1854–1858

== All justices ==
Name	Began service	Ended service	Notes
Don G. Abel	1946	1947	
Gerry L. Alexander	1995	2011	
Thomas J. Anders	1889	1905	
James A. Andersen	1984	1995	
Theo Angelis	2026	present	
William D. Askren	1925	1928	
Frederick Bausman	1915	1916	
Walter B. Beals	1928	1946	
Adam Beeler	1930	1932	
Bruce Blake	1932	1946	
Robert Brachtenbach	1972	1995	
Bobbe Bridge	2001	2007	
Jesse B. Bridges	1919	1927	died in office
Keith M. Callow	1985	1991	
Tom Chambers	2001	2013	
Stephen J. Chadwick	1908	1919	
Edward M. Connelly	1946	1947	
Herman D. Crow	1913	1915	
Carolyn R. Dimmick	1981	1985	
James M. Dolliver	1976	1999	
Charles T. Donworth	1949	1967	
Fred H. Dore	1981	1993	
Samuel Marion Driver	1940; 1945	1942; 1946	
Ralph O. Dunbar	1889	1912	
Barbara Durham	1985	1998	
Overton G. Ellis	1911	1918	
Mary Fairhurst	2003	2020	
Robert C. Finley	1951	1976	
Harry Ellsworth Foster	1956; 1957	1956; 1962	
Walter M. French	1927	1930	
Mark A. Fullerton	1899	1931	
James M. Geraghty	1933	1940	
Steven González	2012	present	
William C. Goodloe	1985	1988	
Merritt J. Gordon	1895	1900	
Sheryl Gordon McCloud	2013	present	
Mack F. Gose	1909	1915	
Thomas Eugene Grady	1942; 1949	1945; 1955	
Richard P. Guy	1989	2001	
Hiram E. Hadley	1901; 1903	1902; 1909	
Frank Hale	1963	1975	
Orris L. Hamilton	1962	1979	
Frederick G. Hamley	1949	1956	
Henry E. T. Herman	1931	1932	
Floyd V. Hicks	1977	1982	
Matthew W. Hill	1947	1969	
Oscar Raymond Holcomb	1915; 1927	1927; 1939	
Charles Horowitz	1975	1980	
Chester Ralph Hovey	1921	1923	
John Philo Hoyt	1890	1897	
Robert T. Hunter	1957	1977	
Faith Ireland	1999	2005	
Clyde G. Jeffers	1939	1949	
Charles W. Johnson	1991	present	
James M. Johnson	2005	2014	
Kenneth Mackintosh	1918	1928	Chief Justice Jan. 10, 1927 – April 16, 1928
Barbara Madsen	1993	2026	
John F. Main	1912	1942	
Joseph A. Mallery	1942	1962	
Walter T. McGovern	1968	1971	
Colleen Melody	2026	present	
William J. Millard	1928; 1956	1949; 1957	
John R. Mitchell	1918	1937	
Raquel Montoya-Lewis	2020	present	
George E. Morris	1909	1918	
Wallace Mount	1901	1921	
Sal Mungia	2025	present	
Marshall Allen Neill	1967	1972	
Ralph O. Olson	1951	1955	
Richard B. Ott	1955	1967	
Susan Owens	2001	2024	
Emmett N. Parker	1909	1933	
Vernon Robert Pearson	1982	1989	
William H. Pemberton	1923	1925	
Rosselle Pekelis	1995	1996	
James Bradley Reavis	1897	1903	
John Robinson	1937	1951	
Milo A. Root	1905	1908	
Hugh J. Rosellini	1955	1984	
Frank H. Rudkin	1905	1911	
Richard B. Sanders	1996	2011	
Edgar W. Schwellenbach	1946	1957	
Elmon Scott	1889	1899	
Morell E. Sharp	1970; 1971	1971; 1971	
George B. Simpson	1937	1951	
Charles Z. Smith	1988	2003	
Charles F. Stafford	1970	1984	
William J. Steinert	1932	1949	
Debra L. Stephens	2008	present	
Theodore L. Stiles	1889	1895	
Phil Talmadge	1995	2001	
Warren W. Tolman	1918	1937	
Robert F. Utter	1971	1995	
Frank P. Weaver	1951	1970	
J. Stanley Webster	1916	1918	
William H. White	1900; 1901	1901; 1902	
Helen Whitener	2020	present	
Charles K. Wiggins	2011	2020	
William H. Williams	1979	1985	
Charles T. Wright	1971	1980	
Mary Yu	2014	2025	
