= State v. Strasburg =

1910 Washington Supreme Court case

- Court: Washington Supreme Court
- Full case name: The State of Washington v. Martin Strasburg
- Decided: September 10, 1910
- Citation: 110 P. 1020, 60 Wash. 106, 1910 Wash. LEXIS 1016

Case history
- Appealed from: Superior Court of King County

Court membership
- Judges sitting: Rudkin, Chadwick, Crow, Fullerton, Gose, Morris, Mount, Parker

Case opinions
- Majority: Parker, joined by Crow and Mount
- Concurrence: Rudkin, joined by Gose and Chadwick; Dunbar joined in part
- Concur/dissent: Morris
- Dissent: Fullerton

Keywords
- Insanity defense; Right to jury trial; Due process; Legislation

State v. Strasburg, 110 P. 1020 (Wash. 1910), was a case decided by the Washington Supreme Court that held that a statute eliminating the insanity defense was unconstitutional. The court likened the exclusion of evidence of insanity to a denial of trial by jury.

Martin Strasburg, described as "an unknown and penniless stranger", was convicted of assault after shooting Otto Peeck in a saloon in Seattle. Lawyers saw the Strasburg case as an opportunity to have the Washington law that forbade insanity defenses declared unconstitutional. The effect of the Supreme Court declaring the law unconstitutional was said to be expected to reverse the convictions of "scores" of people.
