= Don G. Abel =

American attorney and judge (1894–1980)

The Honourable Don G. Abel

Justice of the Washington Supreme Court
- In office 1946 – 1947

Personal details
- Born: Donald George Abel; December 23, 1894 Lincoln Center, Kansas, U.S.
- Died: July 8, 1980 (aged 85) Mercer Island, Washington, U.S.
- Spouse: Marion Ross
- Children: 3
- Education: University of Washington School of Law (LLB)
- Occupation: prosecuting attorney; judge

Donald George Abel (December 23, 1894 – July 8, 1980) was an American attorney who served as a Washington State Supreme Court Justice from 1946 to 1947.

== Early life and education ==
His father, George D. Abel, was a Superior Court Judge of Grays Harbor County, the center of the state's logging industry. In 1913, Don graduated from Hoquiam High School. He attended the University of Washington, where he played football under coach Gil Dobie, and received a B.A. degree in 1917.

During World War I, Abel served in the 91st Division of the U.S. Army, was decorated for gallantry in the Battle of the Argonne, and rose to the rank of captain.

Following his discharge, he returned to the University of Washington School of Law, and graduated with a LL.B. degree in 1919.

== Career ==
After graduation, Abel engaged in the private practice of law in Chehalis, and then held a series of government posts. From 1922 to 1926, he served as the Prosecuting Attorney of Lewis County. In 1932, he ran unsuccessfully for the Democratic nomination to Congress in the Third District. From May 1936 to February 1940, Abel was state administrator of the federal Works Progress Administration.

In September 1942, he ran unsuccessfully for a position on the state Supreme Court, losing to John Robinson. In 1946, Abel was appointed to Supreme Court as acting Justice during the absence of Walter B. Beals, who was Presiding Judge at the International Military Tribunal I in Nuremberg, Germany.

In 1957, Governor Albert Rosellini appointed Abel to the State Public Service Commission, and later to the Washington State Liquor Cannabis Board, where he served as member and chairman.

== Personal life ==
He was married to Marion E. Ross. They had three children, including a daughter, Janice Abel Colby, and twins born on January 20, 1920: Margaret Louise Abel and Donald G. Abel Jr. Donald Jr., graduated from the University of Washington Law School, as did his father, served as Grays Harbor Prosecuting Attorney, and practiced law in Seattle.

Abel, Sr. died July 8, 1980.

Legal offices
Preceded by Walter B. Beals	Associate Justice of the Washington Supreme Court; 1946-1947	Succeeded by Walter B. Beals
