= Judge Hadley =

Judge Hadley may refer to:

- Gordon Slynn, Baron Slynn of Hadley (1930–2009), British judge of the European Court of Justice
- Hiram E. Hadley (1854–1929), judge of the Washington superior court, and later justice of the Washington Supreme Court
- John V. Hadley (c. 1839/42–1915), judge of the 19th Circuit Court of Indiana
