= Elmon =

Elmon is a given name. Notable people with the name include:

- Elmon T. Gray (1925–2011), American lumberman, real estate developer, philanthropist, and politician
- Elmon Scott (1853–1921), associate justice and chief justice of the Washington Supreme Court
- Elmon Wright (1929—1984), American jazz trumpeter

== See also ==
- Elman (name)
