= Kenneth McIntosh =

Kenneth or Ken McIntosh or similar may refer to:

- Ken McIntosh (fl. 1990s–2010s), New Zealand rugby league player and coach
- Ken McIntosh (bassist) (fl. 2000s–2010s), in the Scottish indie pop band, Aberfeldy
- Kenny McIntosh (born 2000), American football running back
- Ken Macintosh (born 1962), Scottish politician who served as the Presiding Officer of the Scottish Parliament
- Kenneth Mackintosh (1875–1957), American judge, justice of the Washington Supreme Court
- Ken Mackintosh (1919–2005), English saxophonist, composer and bandleader

== See also ==
- Kennedy McIntosh (1949–2009), American basketball player
