= John R. Mitchell (judge) =

American judge (1861–1939)

John R. Mitchell (January 32, 1861 – March 24, 1939) was a justice of the Washington Supreme Court from 1918 to 1937.

== Education and early career ==
Born in Halifax County, Virginia, Mitchell was educated in private schools, including the Law Department of the University of Virginia. He moved to Olympia, Washington in 1888, and gained admission to the bar there in 1889.

From 1889 to 1893, Mitchell was associated in practice with Judge M. A. Root. In 1897 he became a prosecuting attorney, serving in that role until 1899. In 1901 he formed a partnership with Thomas M. Vance, which continued until 1908.

== Judicial service ==
In 1908, Mitchell was appointed to the Superior Court for Thurston and Mason counties. Mitchell was twice re-elected to the superior court, without opposition, remaining in that office for ten years. During his tenure, he ruled in favor of the constitutionality the state's railroad commission act, and the law establishing the state department of labor and industries.

On May 11, 1918, Governor Ernest Lister jointly appointed Mitchell and Warren W. Tolman to vacant seats on the state supreme court, with Mitchell succeeding Justice Overton G. Ellis. Mitchell was later elected to the seat, to a term expiring in 1925, and thereafter re-elected until his retirement from the court in 1937.

== Personal life and death ==
Mitchell married Hallie Price of Kentucky in Virginia on April 22, 1891. They had one son. Dr. Richard S. Mitchell, a prominent physician and surgeon.

Mitchell died at his home at the age of 78, following several months of poor health.

Political offices
Preceded by Overton G. Ellis	Justice of the Washington Supreme Court; 1918–1937	Succeeded by John Robinson
