= Justice Dunbar =

Justice Dunbar may refer to:

- Ralph O. Dunbar (1845–1912), associate justice of the Washington Supreme Court
- William Dunbar (politician) (1805–1861), associate justice of the Louisiana Supreme Court
