= Justice Callow =

Justice Callow may refer to:

- Keith M. Callow (1925–2008), associate justice of the Washington Supreme Court
- William G. Callow (1921–2018), associate justice of the Wisconsin Supreme Court
