= Senator Dore =

Senator Dore may refer to:

- Fred H. Dore (1925–1996), Washington State Senate
- John Clark Dore (1822–1900), New Hampshire State Senate
