= Don Abel =

Don Abel may refer to:

- Don Abel (politician) (born 1952), politician in Ontario, Canada
- Don G. Abel (1894–1980), American judge
