= William H. White (judge) =

American judge (1842–1914)

William Henry White (May 28, 1842 – April 29, 1914) was a justice of the Washington Supreme Court between 1900 and 1902.

== Early life, education, and military service ==
Born in Wellsburg, Virginia (later West Virginia), He received his early instruction in the private schools of the state; he then entered the Vermillion Institute at Hayesville, Ashland County, Ohio, and was there engaged in his studies when the Civil War broke out.

In May 1862, he gave up his studies and enlisted at Ashland in the 102nd Ohio Volunteer Infantry during the American Civil War. After three months in the field he was promoted to First or Orderly Sergeant of his Company. He was seriously wounded at Athens, Alabama, in a fight with General Forrest's Cavalry in the fall of 1864; and was, on account of his wounds, mustered out of service at Huntsville, Alabama, in May, 1865, after the capture of Jefferson Davis.

== Postwar career ==
Returning from the war, White taught school one year in Ohio. He then returned to his home in Wellsburg and read law in the office of Hon. Joseph H. Pendleton, an eminent lawyer, and gained admission to the bar before the Court of Appeals of West Virginia in 1868. In early life and until the close of the war he was a Republican, and he assisted in the organization of that party in Virginia. Not favoring its Reconstruction policy, nor the impeachment of Andrew Johnson, nor the test-oath legislation enacted by West Virginia at the close of the war, he joined the Democratic party. He was elected recorder and probate judge of Brooke County on the Democratic ticket in 1868 and was re-elected to the same office in 1870. He resigned this office after locating in Seattle, where he arrived in July 1871, with no acquaintances in the Pacific Northwest. White was leader of the Washington State Democratic Party, where he became known as "War Horse Bill" White.

Soon after his arrival, White entered into a partnership with Col. Charles H. Larrabee, which continued until 1873, when an economic downturn in Seattle prompted White to move to Pittsburgh, Pennsylvania. He quickly became dissatisfied with the East, and in 1874 returned to Seattle and resumed his partnership with Larrabee, which continued until 1877, when the latter moved to California. In 1876, White was elected Prosecuting Attorney of the Third Judicial District, comprising all of Western Washington north of Thurston and Mason Counties. In 1878 he was elected to the lower House of the Legislative Assembly of the territory, and there he served as chairman of the judiciary committee. In 1881 he partnered with Charles F. Munday, until White's appointment to the state supreme court. In 1885 he was appointed by President Grover Cleveland as United States Attorney for the entire Territory of Washington. He served in this office until the territory was admitted to statehood in November, 1889. He also served one term as city attorney of Seattle.

After his retirement from the Bench he resided at Redmond (named for his wife's father), until 1911. There he owned a large farm and other valuable real estate. He later returned to Seattle, on account of the superior facilities for educating his children.

== Judicial service and later life ==
Following the resignation of Merritt J. Gordon from the state supreme court in 1900, Governor John Rankin Rogers appointed White to the seat, to which White was then elected that November. The term ended the following January. In 1901, the legislature provided for the appointment of two judges to serve only until October 1902. Governor Rogers appointed William H. White and Hiram E. Hadley to these positions.

== Personal life and death ==
White married Emma McRedmond, with whom he had three daughters.

White died in Spokane, at the age of 72.

Political offices
Preceded by Merritt J. Gordon; Newly established seat	Justice of the Washington Supreme Court; 1900–1901; 1901–1902	Succeeded by Wallace Mount; Seat expired
