= J. Stanley Webster =

American judge

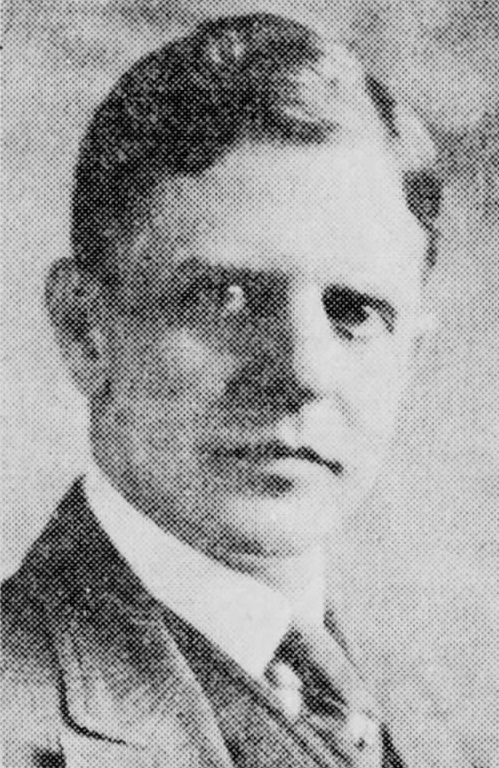
- From campaign advertisement printed in October 6, 1922 Leavenworth Echo (Leavenworth, WA).

Senior Judge of the United States District Court for the Eastern District of Washington
- In office August 31, 1939 – December 24, 1962

Judge of the United States District Court for the Eastern District of Washington
- In office April 28, 1923 – August 31, 1939
- Appointed by: Warren G. Harding (recess); Calvin Coolidge (commission)
- Preceded by: Frank H. Rudkin
- Succeeded by: Lewis B. Schwellenbach

Member of the U.S. House of Representatives from Washington's 5th district
- In office March 4, 1919 – May 8, 1923
- Preceded by: Clarence Dill
- Succeeded by: Samuel B. Hill

Personal details
- Born: John Stanley Webster; February 22, 1877 Cynthiana, Kentucky, U.S.
- Died: December 24, 1962 (aged 85) Spokane, Washington, U.S.
- Resting place: Oakesdale Cemetery; Oakesdale, Washington
- Party: Republican
- Education: University of Michigan Law School

John Stanley Webster (February 22, 1877 – December 24, 1962) was a justice of the Washington Supreme Court, a United States representative from Washington and a United States district judge of the United States District Court for the Eastern District of Washington.

== Education and career ==
Born on February 22, 1877, in Cynthiana, Kentucky, Webster attended the public schools and Smith's Classical School for Boys. He attended the University of Michigan Law School. He was admitted to the bar and entered private practice in Cynthiana from 1899 to 1906. He was prosecutor for Harrison County from 1902 to 1906. He moved west for his health to work a small ranch near Colbert, Washington, just north of Spokane, Washington in May 1906. He was chief assistant prosecutor for Spokane from 1907 to 1909. He was a Judge of the Superior Court of the State of Washington for Spokane County from 1909 to 1916. He was a lecturer on criminal and elementary law at Gonzaga University in Spokane. Webster was easily elected to a six-year term as an associate justice of the Washington Supreme Court in Olympia in 1916, and appointed early, November 20 by Governor Ernest Lister, to fill the vacancy. He resigned in May 1918 to run for United States Congress.

== Congressional service ==
Webster was elected as a Republican from Washington's 5th congressional district to the United States House of Representatives of the 66th, 67th and 68th United States Congresses and served from March 4, 1919, to May 8, 1923, when he resigned to accept a federal judgeship.

== Federal judicial service ==
Webster received a recess appointment from President Warren G. Harding on April 28, 1923, to a seat on the United States District Court for the Eastern District of Washington vacated by Judge Frank H. Rudkin. He was nominated to the same position by President Calvin Coolidge on December 15, 1923. He was confirmed by the United States Senate on January 16, 1924, and received his commission the same day. He assumed senior status due to a certified disability on August 31, 1939. His service terminated on December 24, 1962, due to his death in Spokane, where he resided. His remains were cremated and interred in Oakesdale Cemetery in Oakesdale, Washington, his wife's hometown in Whitman County, where her father John Lathrum (1853–1902) had been sheriff. Mary Gertrude (Lathrum) Webster (1887–1956), his wife of 48 years, had died six years earlier. His older brother, Richard M. Webster (1869–1953), moved to eastern Washington in 1904 and also served as a judge in Spokane.

== Other service ==
Webster briefly served as the president of the Western International League (WIL) in minor league baseball, a predecessor of the Northwest League, and resigned in February 1941.

== Sources ==
- "John Stanley Webster". Biographical Directory of the United States Congress.

Political offices
Preceded by Frederick Bausman	Justice of the Washington Supreme Court; 1916–1918	Succeeded by Warren W. Tolman
U.S. House of Representatives
Preceded by Clarence Dill	United States Representative for Washington's 5th Congressional District; 1919–1923	Succeeded by Samuel B. Hill
Legal offices
Preceded by Frank H. Rudkin	Judge of the United States District Court for the Eastern District of Washington; 1923–1939	Succeeded by Lewis B. Schwellenbach
