= James Bradley Reavis =

American judge (1848–1912)

James Bradley Reavis (May 27, 1848 – April 29, 1912) was a justice of the Washington Supreme Court from January 11, 1897 to January 13, 1903, serving as chief justice in 1901.

Born in Boone County, Missouri, Reavis graduated from the University of Kentucky in 1872, and practiced law in Hannibal, Missouri for two years before moving and continuing to practice in Chico, California. He then moved to the Territory of Washington in 1880. He was a member of the territorial council and regent of the University of Washington from 1888 to 1889, prior to statehood.

Reavis practiced la in Goldendale, Washington with his law partner Supreme Court Justice Ralph Oregon Dunbar.

He was elected to the state supreme court on the populist ticket.During his last two years at the supreme court, he served as chief justice. After Reavis lost his bid on the Democratic ticket for re-election in 1902, it was said his mental health began to decline.

Reavis married Minnie Freeman in 1891. In 1909, not long after moving to Seattle with his wife and children, he was found wandering the streets of Capitol Hill in the middle of the night, talking incoherently. His wife testified that at 65 he had become violent on occasions -- such as breaking furniture and tossing household items. Police took him to the hospital, where a doctor declared him insane.

He was later moved to the Western Washington Hospital for the Insane (now Western State Hospital) at Steilacoom, where he died in 1912. He had been confined there for roughly three years.

Political offices
| Preceded by John Philo Hoyt | Justice of the Washington Supreme Court; 1897–1903 | Succeeded by Hiram E. Hadley |
