= Frederick Bausman (judge) =

Frederick Bausman (1861–1931), Washington judge

Frederick Bausman (March 23, 1862 – June 19, 1931) was a Washington lawyer who served as a justice of the Washington Supreme Court from 1915 to 1916.

== Early life, education, and career ==
Bausman was born to Sallie B. Bausman, an Irish Ulster Protestant Mother. His father was Henry A. Bausman, a Coke manufacturer. He received his education at the Western University of Pennsylvania and at Harvard. Bausman was the nephew of Frederick Bausman. Bausman married Adelaide Bausman (born 26 Nov 1860 in Boston, Massachusetts) in 1894. He had a stepdaughter known as Mrs. Percy Lameraux nee Belle Holmes. The marriage of Mrs. Percy Lameraux took place at the Bausman home in Washington in 1898.

Bausman had been a member of the Chamber of Commerce and the Rainer Club. He also was the principal speaker October 12, 1916 at the celebration held in their club room by the Knights of Columbus to celebrate the state's fourth Columbus Day. He headed the law firm Bausman, Kellcher, Oldham & Goodale at the time. The firm represented many large businesses in Seattle including the Seattle Times. The firm later became Bausman, Oldham, Bullitt & Eggerman. In 1929 Donald Eggerman, a Partner and Edward Rosling, an Associate, left the firm and started a new firm that would become Williams Kastner & Gibbs. Bausman delivered the principal address for Governor Lister at the memorial service held by The King County Democratic Club at Good Eats Cafeteria on Saturday, July 5, 1919.

Bausman was a known opponent to the single tax system. He had also been an advocate for the creation of an agricultural development district and had helped draft a bill on that subject. The bill was introduced into the legislature, but did not pass.

Bausman was also a member of Gonzaga University's law faculty. He delivered the congratulatory address to the graduating class on June 15, 1916.

Seattle artist Jeanie Walter Walkinshaw (1885-1976) painted a portrait of Frederick Bausman available at the Washington State Supreme Court Temple of Justice.

== Defense of Seattle mayor ==
Bausman volunteered to and defended Seattle Mayor Hiram Gill against charges brought by the U.S. District Attorney for conspiracy to aid the Logan Billinglsey bootlegging syndicate. Bausman also defended Seattle Police Chief Beckingham and four Detectives Peyser, Poolman, McLennan and Doom in the same case.

Bausman closed his plea to the grand jury on behalf of acquittal for Mayor Gill with the words: "There are two people who await your verdict most anxiously. One is little Mrs. Gill with her two boys. The other is Logan Billingsley, emissary of hell!"

Bausman has been characterized as dramatic, satirical, and suave in his role as a lawyer. He incurred laughs from the jury and crowd in his defense of Gill when he stated that Gill "look[ed] like a boiled owl."

== Supreme Court of Washington position ==
Bausman was appointed to the bench by Governor Ernest Lister on October 25, 1915 following the passing of Bausman's predecessor Judge Herman D. Crow on October 22, 1915. Bausman had never held public office or been a candidate with the exception of serving as the private secretary to Eugene Semple - the last territorial governor of Washington—from 1887 to 1889.

Bausman was sworn in September 1, 1915. Bausman was 52 years old at the time and had practiced law in Washington since 1891. Governor Lister hosted a dinner evening in honor of Justice and Bausman at his residence November 16 of 1915.

Throughout his time at the Washington State Supreme Court editorials published by the Perkins Press and the Seattle Post Intelligencer sought to imply that Governor Lister had urged Judge Bausman to resign from the bench in the spring of 1916, so that Lister could appoint another Democrat to it who would have the prestige of the office to carry him through the campaign this fall. Lister responded to the reports calling them an "unmitigated lie."

Lister also was quoted saying "I can conceive of its use only on the ground that It probably comes from sources whence many 'rumors' of like character have emanated regarding this department," he added. "I have urged and it has been my hope that Judge Bausman would see his way clear not only to remain on the bench until the end of the term for which he was appointed, as he will do, but also that he would become a candidate to succeed himself."

In July 1916 Bausman announced he did not intend to run for election for his Supreme Court position and that he would resign in September 1916 provided a majority vote was cast for a candidate for the office—otherwise he would remain in office until that November.

J. Stanley Webster was unopposed in the 1916 primaries to replace Bausman as Supreme Court Justice. Relatedly Bausman submitted his resignation to take effect October 19, 1916.

=== Decisions of the Court ===
On December 10, 1915, the Washington Supreme Court affirmed the state-wide prohibition law, however Bausman was not included in the opinion as he had not yet been a justice at the time of the cases' argument.

=== State v. Towesnnute ===
Bausman authored a 1916 Washington State Supreme Court ruling in the case of State v. Towesnnute that mandated criminal charges against a Yakama Nation tribal member for fishing outside of his reservation on traditional tribal fishing grounds.

Alec Towessnute was a member of the Confederated Tribes and Bands of the Yakama Nation who in 1915 was fishing near Prosser, about five miles outside the Yakama Reservation using traditional tribal fishing methods. Towessnute was arrested and, like many tribal members throughout the Pacific Northwest being arrested for fishing off tribal land, asserted that he was fishing according to treaty rights. A Benton County Superior Court judge agreed with Towessnute and dismissed the charges, but the county prosecutor appealed, and in 1916 the state Supreme Court mandated that the criminal charges be reinstated.

Bausman wrote in regards to fishing rights detailed in tribal treaties: “These arrangements were but the announcement of our benevolence which, notwithstanding our frequent frailties, has been continuously displayed. Neither Rome nor sagacious Britain ever dealt more liberally with their subject races than we with these savage tribes, whom it was generally tempting and always easy to destroy and whom we have so often permitted to squander vast areas of fertile land before our eyes.”

==== Repudiation ====
A descendant of Mr. Towessnute, Yakama Nation member Johnson Meninick, spent years working to have the fishing convictions of his family reversed. After Mr. Meninick’s death, attorney Jack Fiander contacted the state Supreme Court with a request to reverse the 1916 ruling and to vacate any conviction of Mr. Towessnute.

The Washington Supreme Court took up the petition by Mr. Fiander in 2020, unanimously agreeing that the 1916 ruling was unjust and worse, reflected racist attitudes towards Native people.

"We take this opportunity to repudiate this case, its language, its conclusions, and its mischaracterization of the Yakama people", the order says. "We cannot forget our own history, and we cannot change it. We can, however, forge a new path forward, committing to justice as we do so".

The order was read from the bench on behalf of the court by Associate Justice Raquel Montoya-Lewis, the first Native American justice in Washington state.

== Publications ==
Bausman wrote a book titled, Let France Explain, where he criticized France for their role in World War I—and indicated that France should too bear the losses brought on by World War I and receive less than it was awarded under the Treaty of Versailles.

In 1908, Bausman wrote a novel titled Adventures of a Nice Young Man.

Bausman was a contributor to a 1922 report to the United States Senate presented before a special committee tasked with inquiring into the "occupation and administration" of the Republic of Haiti and the Dominican Republic. The report was titled, The Seizure of Haiti by the United States: A Report on the Military Occupation of the Republic of Haiti and the History of the Treaty Forced Upon Her. The report recommended (1) abrogation by the US of the 1915 treaty; (2) the holding of elections to the legislative bodies of Haiti; and (3) the negotiation of a new, friendly, treaty between the United States and Haiti.

Political offices
Preceded by Herman D. Crow	Justice of the Washington Supreme Court; 1915–1916	Succeeded by J. Stanley Webster
