= Edgar G. Mills =

American politician

- Born: September 15, 1860
- Died: after 1921
- Occupation: Politician
- Years active: 1892 - 1921
- Known for: A member of the Wisconsin State Assembly and the Wisconsin State Senate.

Edgar G. Mills (born September 15, 1860; died after 1921) was a member of the Wisconsin State Assembly and the Wisconsin State Senate.

== Biography ==
Born in Aurora, Waushara County, Wisconsin, Mills was educated in the public schools and then began working in a grocery store in Berlin, Wisconsin. After a year or two of this, he became a commercial traveler for a time, finally settling down to the study of the law. He eventually became a lawyer in St. Cloud, Minnesota before settling in Superior, Wisconsin in 1890. In 1889, he married Sarah Chadbourne.

== Political career ==
Mills was elected to the Assembly in 1892. After unsuccessful seeking the Republican nomination for the United States House of Representatives from Wisconsin's 10th congressional district, narrowly losing to Nils P. Haugen, he was elected to the Wisconsin State Senate in 1898 to represent the 11th District. He introduced the Mills Vessel Taxation Bill, "greatly benefiting the city of Superior". Later, as chairman of the joint committee on Appropriations, "his systematic business methods greatly reduced the expenses of public institutions and saved the State about a million dollars". In 1902, he became an Assistant United States Attorney. As part of this work, Mills was a member of the Spanish–American War Claims Commission, working in Washington, D.C., and Cuba.

Mills later moved to the state of Washington, where he was "as active in politics as he was in Wisconsin". He was a nominee for election to the Washington Supreme Court in 1914, but was defeated in the election, the seat going to Stephen J. Chadwick. Mills ran for a seat on the court again in 1916, but his name was dropped from the ballot for the primary election. He appeared on the general election ballot as a write-in candidate, receiving some votes but failing to gain electing to the seat.

In 1918, disbarment proceedings were brought against Mills in connection with alleged connections to a blackmail case in which he was the attorney for an blackmailer targeting former ambassador David Eugene Thompson. Mills was recommended to be suspended for a year, but nonetheless filed once again to run for a seat on the supreme court in August, and shortly after his loss in that effort, was disbarred from the practice of law entirely.

In 1921, Mills sought readmission to the bar, having worked as a laborer in the saw mills and the like since his disbarment.

== Personal life ==
In 1889, Mills married Sarah Chadbourne, the daughter of former Minnesota state legislator C. H. Chadbourne. Sarah was a graduate of the St. Cloud Normal School and taught several years in Minneapolis and Duluth. Mills and his wife had two sons, Edgar C. and Reed C.
