= Hoquiam High School =

Coordinates: 46°58′58″N 123°54′39″W

Location
- 501 W. Emerson Ave; Hoquiam, Washington 98550; United States

Information
- Type: Public
- Established: 1891
- Principal: Brock Maxfield
- Teaching staff: 25.40 (FTE)
- Grades: 9-12
- Enrollment: 435 (2023–2024)
- Student to teacher ratio: 17.13
- Colors: Crimson and gray
- Mascot: Grizzly

Hoquiam High School, located within the Hoquiam School District in Hoquiam, Washington, is a comprehensive high school which first opened in 1891. Hoquiam serves as the third largest high school in Grays Harbor County, Washington; covering the city of Hoquiam and unincorporated parts of northern Grays Harbor County. The school is accredited by the Washington State Superintendent of Public Instruction.

== Location ==
The campus adjoins John Gable Community Park, and is adjacent to both Bowerman Basin in Grays Harbor and the Grays Harbor National Wildlife Refuge. It is roughly 16 miles from the Pacific coast, 25 miles from the Quinault Indian Reservation, and 45 miles from the Olympic National Park.

== Faculty, student body and activities ==
The principal is Brock Maxfield, who attended the school as a student, and vice principal is Bonnie Jump. There are 34 full-time teachers, with an average of nearly 12 years experience, offering 120 courses in the arts and sciences. There are 32 percent minority students, including 18.2 percent Latino and 5.5 percent Native American. The campus was built for roughly 1,200 students, while less than 500 are now enrolled in part due to the economic decline of Grays Harbor County (as a result of the dwindling logging trade in the mid-to-late 1980s).

The school provides a variety of student activities. The school fields a marching band and cheer squad. Each year, the Drama Club presents theater to the community. The mascot is a Grizzly Bear.

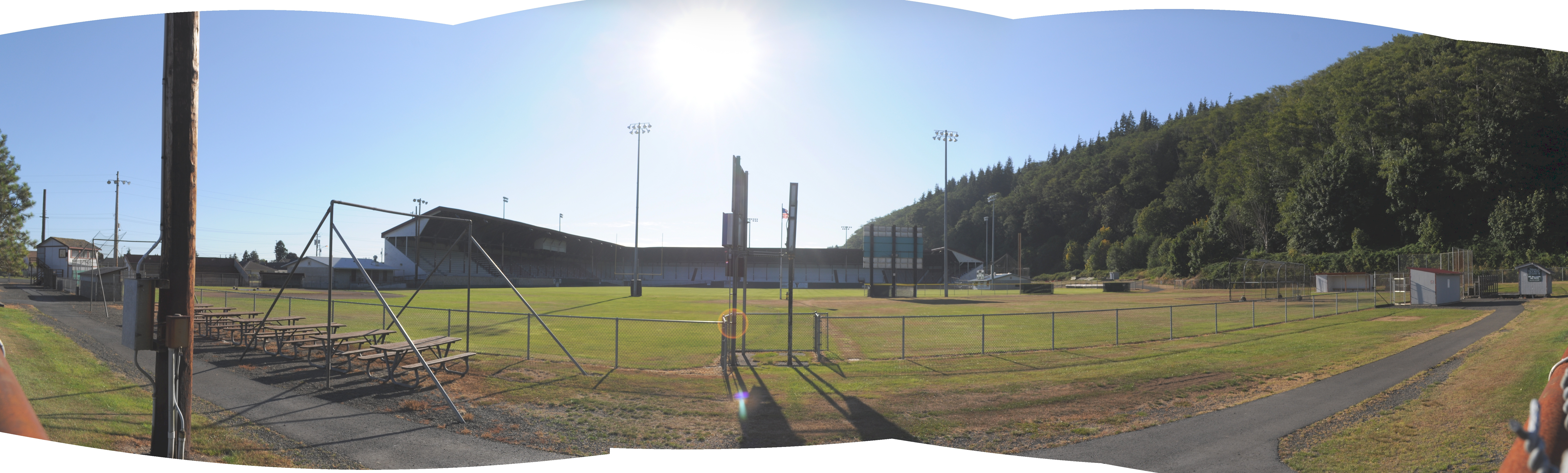
Hoquiam Olympic Stadium, home turf for the Grizzlies football team.

The athletics programs are a source of school spirit and community pride. The track was reinstalled and rededicated in 2005, and the boys track and field team won the state championship in 2012 and 2013. The football team plays its home games at Olympic Stadium with a capacity of 8,500. A more than 100 year tradition is the game against neighboring Aberdeen High School, which has been described as one of the greatest high school football rivalries in the nation.

== State championships ==
2015 - Boys Baseball
2013 - Boys Track and Field
2012 - Boys Track & Field
2007 - Girls Wrestling
2006 - Girls Fastpitch
2004 - Boys Basketball
1988 - Boys Wrestling
1983 - Boys Track & Field
1980 - Boys Baseball
1942 - Boys Basketball
1939 - Boys Basketball

== Community support ==
HHS has tremendous community support, with a strong history of passing school levies and high level of parental volunteers. The school has two major fundraising groups, the Grizzly Booster Club and the Grizzly Alumni Association, that support various Hoquiam School District causes.

== Notable alumni ==
- Jimmy Anderson (class of 1955), basketball coach at Oregon State University
- Don G. Abel (class of 1913), prosecuting attorney, head of the state Works Progress Administration (builder of Olympic Stadium), and justice, Washington State Supreme Court
- Ed Gayda (class of 1946), professional basketball player
- Jack Elway (class of 1949), professional football player
- Eldon Bargewell (class of 1965), General in the United States Army
