= Milo A. Root =

American judge (1863–1917)

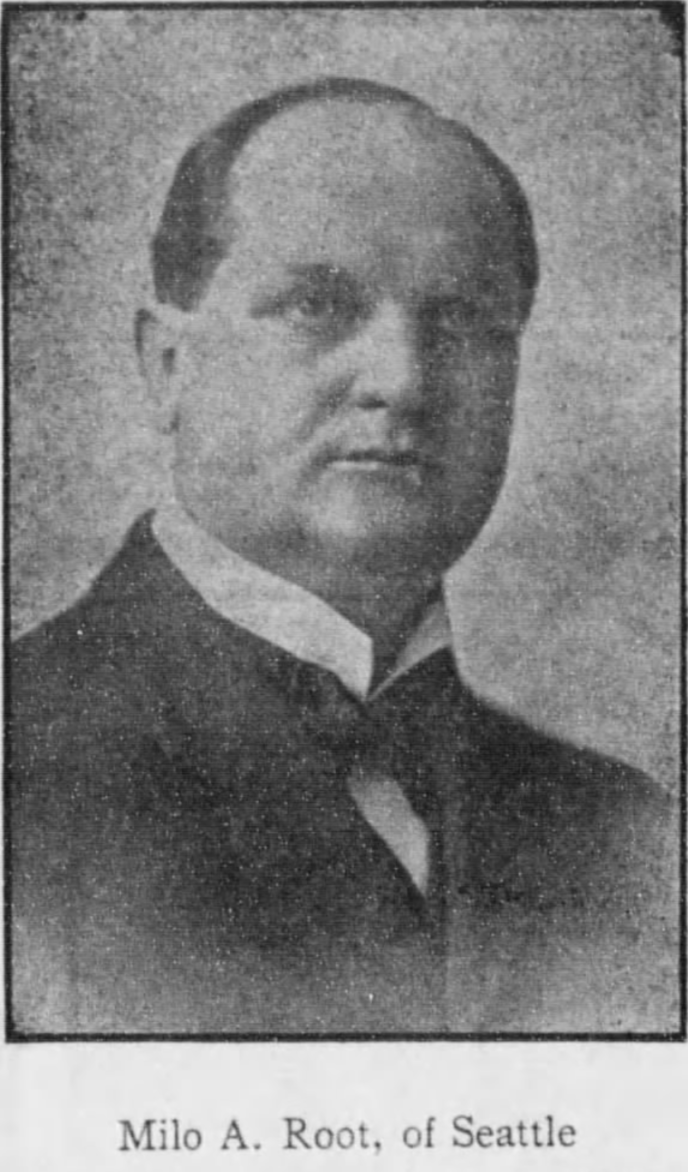
Root as a Justice, in a campaign image for his 1908 reelection campaign

Milo Adelbert Root (January 22, 1863 – January 9, 1917) was a justice of the Washington Supreme Court from 1905 to 1908. He was appointed by Governor Albert E. Mead to a newly created seat on the court.

Born in Illinois, Root's family moved to New York when he was thirteen, where Root received a law degree from Albany Law School in Albany, New York, in 1883. Root moved to the Territory of Washington in 1884. He was probate judge and prosecuting attorney for two terms in each position in Olympia, Washington, and was appointed to the supreme court by Governor Albert E. Mead in 1905.

Root resigned from the supreme bench in 1909 while the state bar association was investigating charges that Root had permitted a railroad attorney to write an opinion in a case involving the railroad. It was alleged that the railroad attorney not only prepared the opinion, but that It was submitted to the chief counsel of the railroad before Root filed tie opinion. The charges and the resignation of Root attracted liational attention. Last aututnn, when Root sought election as superior judgis of King county, the Seattle Bar association, adopted resolutions disapproving his candidacy and reviewing the events of 1908. Root nevertheless claimed that his resignation was prompted by accusations of wrongdoing against a fellow justice with whom Root had a close friendship, saying "any reflection upon any member casts a cloud upon the entire court; and I do not wish to be the means of casting any such cloud even in the slightest degree".

Root died in Seattle at the age of 54 following a three-week illness culminating in a bout of pneumonia.

Political offices
| Preceded by Newly established seat | Justice of the Washington Supreme Court; 1905–1908 | Succeeded by Stephen J. Chadwick |
