= Richard P. Guy =

American judge (1932–2025)

The Honorable Richard P. Guy

Justice of the Washington Supreme Court
- In office 1989 – 2001
- Appointed by: Governor Booth Gardner
- Preceded by: Vernon Pearson

Personal details
- Born: October 24, 1932 Coeur d'Alene, Idaho, U.S.
- Died: October 27, 2025 (aged 93) Seattle, Washington, U.S.
- Education: Gonzaga University (B.A., J.D.)
- Occupation: judge

Richard Post Guy (October 24, 1932 – October 27, 2025) was an American attorney who was a justice of the Washington Supreme Court from 1989 to 2001, serving as chief justice from 1998 to 2001.

== Early life and education ==
Guy was born in Coeur d'Alene, Idaho, on October 24, 1932, to Richard H. and Charlotte M. Guy. He attended Gonzaga University and graduated with a B.A. degree. He then obtained a J.D. from Gonzaga University School of Law in 1959, while clerking for Spokane attorney and court commissioner, Kathleen Taft.

== Legal and judicial career ==
In 1961, he accepted a position with the Spokane County Prosecutor's Office, where he was both a civil deputy and chief criminal deputy prosecuting attorney. In 1967, he worked with the U.S. Agency for International Development on projects in West Africa and Ethiopia. During his career, he was also assistant attorney general for the state of Washington, and counsel to the speaker of the state House of Representatives. In 1981, he entered private practice and was a principal at Winston & Cashatt in Spokane, Washington.

He was a judge of the Spokane County Superior Court for four years: from 1977 to 1981, and again in 1985. In October 1989, Governor Booth Gardner appointed Guy as a justice of the Washington Supreme Court. In November 1990, Guy stood for election for the four years remaining on the term, defeating former Republican Governor John Spellman. In 1994, Guy successfully ran against King County public defender Kevin Patrick Dolan, and was elected to a six year term. In 2000, Guy chaired a study on the death penalty that documented its high costs.

After leaving the bench in 2001, Guy worked as a mediator and arbitrator in Honolulu, Hawaii and Seattle. Guy has also taught law in Italy.

== Death ==
Guy died at his home in Seattle on October 27, 2025, at the age of 93.

== Honors and awards ==
Guy is recipient of several honors, including: the Herbert Harley Award from the American Judicature Society, and the Outstanding Judge Award (in 2000) from the Washington State Bar Association. In addition, he was recognized as the Jurist of the Year by the American Board of Trial Advocates. He has been acclaimed by his alma mater, Gonzaga Law School: in 1993, he received an Honorary Doctor of Laws; in 2001, he received the Distinguished Legal Service Award; and, in 2017, he was conferred the Gonzaga Law Medal.

Political offices
Preceded by Vernon Pearson	Justice of the Washington Supreme Court; 1989–2001	Succeeded by
