= John F. Main =

American judge (1864–1942)

His Honor John F. Main
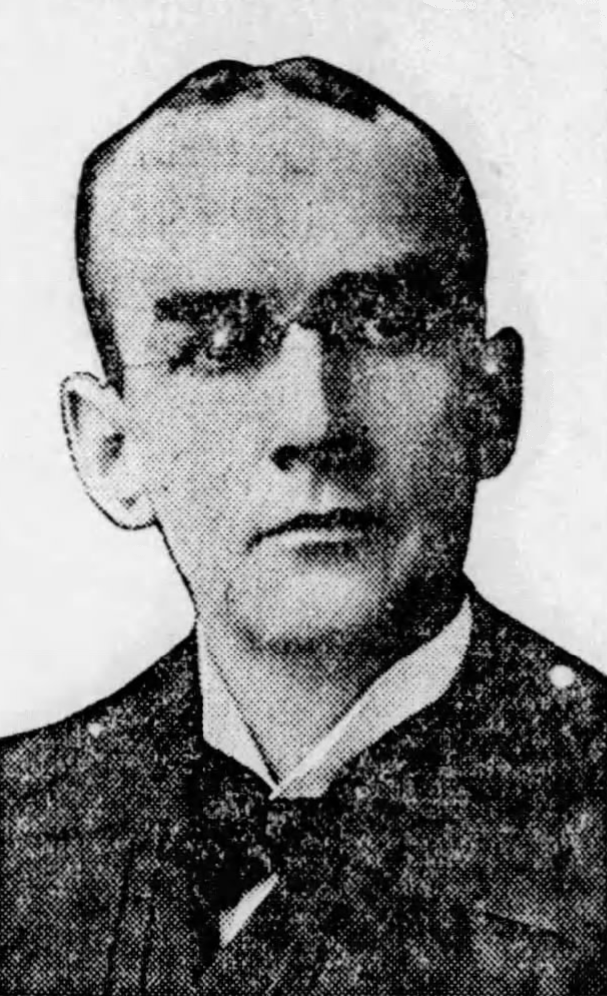
- John F. Main at the time of his appointment to the Washington Supreme Court in 1912

Justice, Washington Supreme Court
- In office 1912–1942
- Preceded by: Ralph O. Dunbar
- Succeeded by: Joseph A. Mallery

Personal details
- Born: 1864 Seaton, Illinois
- Died: October 13, 1942 (aged 77–78) Seattle, Washington
- Citizenship: United States
- Children: one daughter
- Education: Monmouth College; Princeton University (A.B.); University of Michigan Law School
- Profession: Attorney, Law School Professor

John F. Main (1864 – October 13, 1942) was a justice of the Washington Supreme Court from 1912 to 1942.

== Education ==
Born in Seaton, Mercer County, Illinois, Main was raised on a farm there, and attended Monmouth College. He worked his way through school while studying for an A.B. from Princeton University, which he received in 1891. He later attended the University of Michigan Law School.

Main practiced law in Aledo, Illinois, for three years in partnership with George A. Cooke, who later served on the Supreme Court of Illinois. Main moved to Seattle, Washington, in 1900. From 1904 to 1909, he was a professor of law at the University of Washington School of Law.

== Judicial service ==
In 1908, Main was a candidate for a seat on the King County Superior Court. Main was unsuccessful, but in 1909, Governor Marion E. Hay appointed Main to a seat on the King County Superior Court vacated by the elevation of George E. Morris to the state supreme court. Main remained on the superior court until September 1912, when he was appointed by Governor Hay to a seat on the state supreme court vacated by the death of chief justice Ralph O. Dunbar. Main was reelected to the supreme court four times, becoming one of the longest-serving members of that court, and serving as chief justice on two occasions. He planned to seek a fifth term in 1942, winning the Republican primary for the seat, but thereafter was forced to withdraw from the election due to failing health, leaving Joseph A. Mallery running unopposed.

== Personal life and death ==
In 1892, Main married Mary G. Crouch, with whom he had one daughter. Main died at a sanitarium in Seattle at the age of 78, following a period of failing health.

Political offices
Preceded by Ralph O. Dunbar	Justice of the Washington Supreme Court; 1912–1942	Succeeded by Joseph A. Mallery
