= Keith M. Callow =

American judge (1925–2008)

Justice of the Washington Supreme Court
- In office 1985–1991
- Preceded by: Hugh J. Rosellini
- Succeeded by: Charles W. Johnson

Personal details
- Born: Keith McLean Callow; January 11, 1925; Seattle, Washington, U.S.
- Died: April 4, 2008 (aged 83); Seattle, Washington, U.S.
- Spouse: Evelyn Case
- Children: 3
- Education: Lower Merion High School; University of Washington (BA)
- Profession: Lawyer, judge

Military service
- Allegiance: United States
- Branch/service: United States Army
- Battles/wars: World War II; Battle of the Bulge
- Awards: Purple Heart

Keith McLean Callow (January 11, 1925 – April 4, 2008) was a justice of the Washington Supreme Court from 1985 to 1991.

== Early life, education, military service, and career ==
Born in Seattle, Washington, Callow graduated from Lower Merion High School in 1943, and was drafted into the United States Army during World War II. Callow was wounded at the Battle of the Bulge, for which he received a Purple Heart. He thereafter received a B.A. from the University of Washington, followed by a law degree from the same institution. He was a law clerk to Justice Matthew W. Hill, and a trial lawyer, practicing law for seventeen years, including as an assistant attorney general, before serving as a judge in Washington state courts for fifteen years.

== Judicial service ==
On July 5, 1969, Governor Daniel J. Evans appointed Callow to a seat on the King County Superior Court. Callow thereafter served for a period on the Washington Court of Appeals until 1985, when Callow was elected to a seat on the state supreme court that was to be vacated by the retirement of Hugh J. Rosellini. In 1990, Callow lost a bid for another term on the court, and thereafter worked for the United States Department of State, assisting attorneys and judges in Estonia and Kyrgyzstan with the establishment of post-Soviet legal systems.

== Personal life and death ==
While attending the University of Washington, Callow met and married Evelyn Case, to whom he was married for 58 years, until her death. They had three children.

Callow died in Seattle at the age of 83, from complications of diabetes and a kidney failure that had inflicted him since 2006.

Political offices
Preceded by Hugh J. Rosellini	Justice of the Washington Supreme Court; 1985–1991	Succeeded by Charles W. Johnson
