= Warren W. Tolman =

American judge (1861–1940)

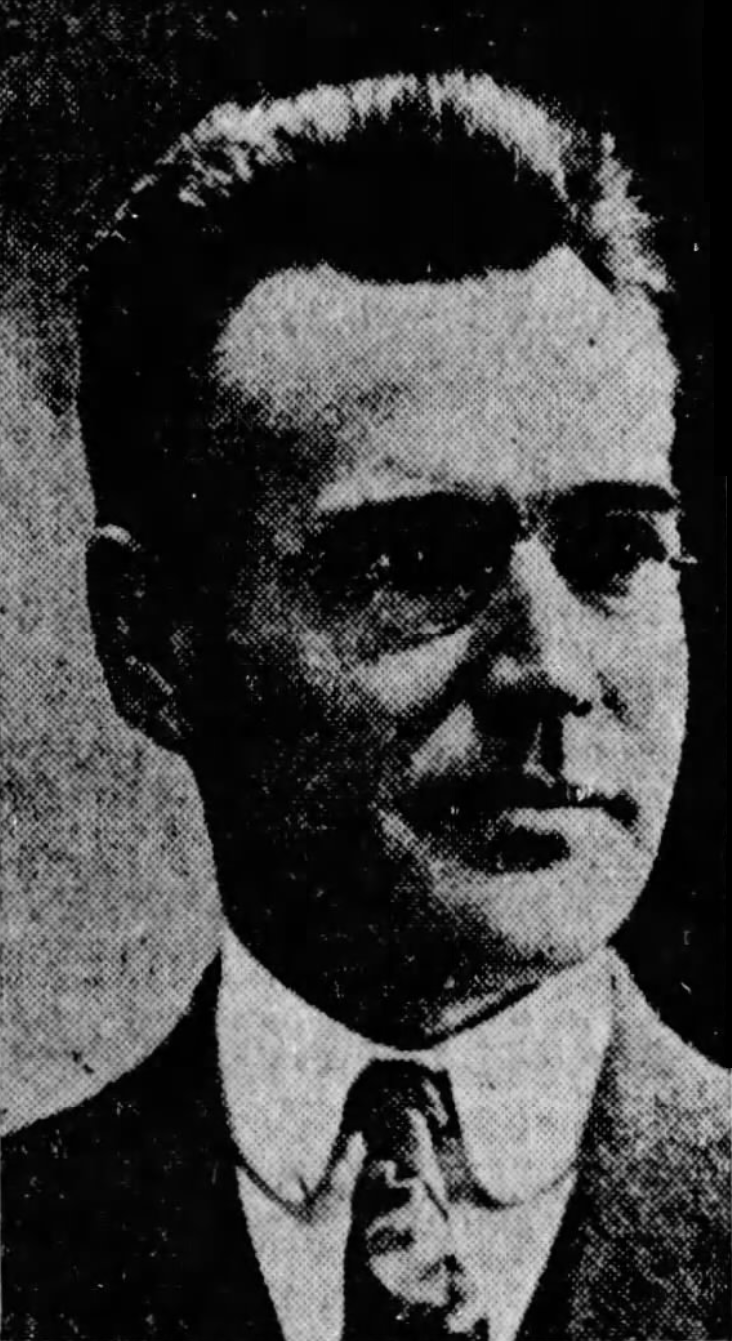
Judge Warren W. Tolman in 1918

Warren W. Tolman (December 8, 1861 – May 15, 1940) was a justice of the Washington Supreme Court from 1918 to 1937.

Born in Illinois, Tolman received a law degree from Northwestern University in 1888.

He moved to Washington in 1892, and served in the Washington State Senate from 1901 to 1905. He ran unsuccessfully for a seat on the supreme court in 1906 and 1910. In 1914, he was a candidate for the Democratic nomination for a seat in the United States Congress.

On May 11, 1918, Governor Ernest Lister jointly appointed Tolman and John R. Mitchell to vacant seats on the court.

Tolman was chief justice from 1925 to 1926, and from 1931 to 1932. Tolman resigned from the court in 1937 due to failing health.

Tolman and his wife Maude had one daughter and one son. Tolman died at his home in Spokane at the age of 79.

Political offices
Preceded by J. Stanley Webster	Justice of the Washington Supreme Court; 1918–1937	Succeeded by George B. Simpson
