= Bantry, North Dakota =

- CDP & Unincorporated community
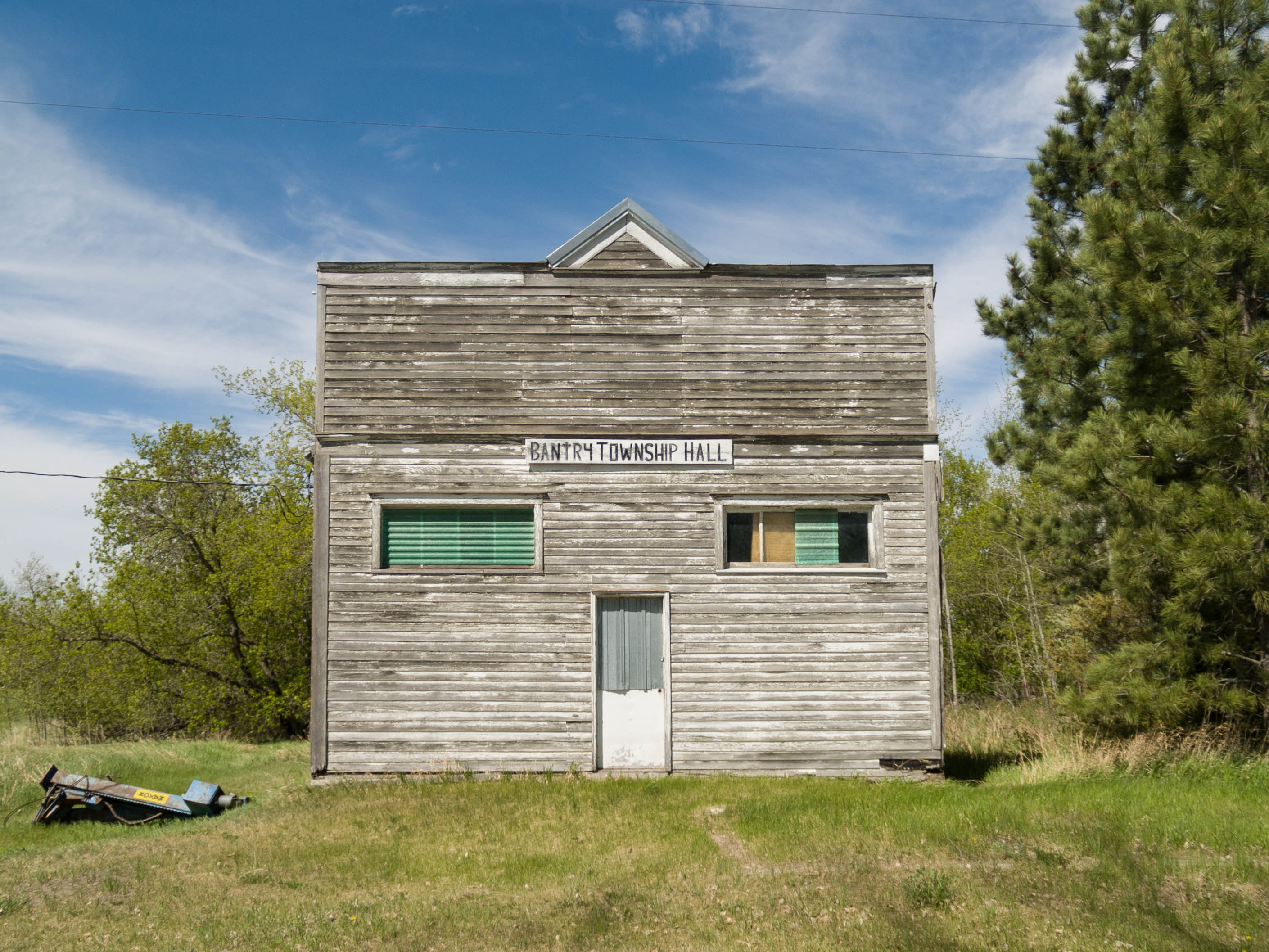
- Bantry Township Hall in Bantry (May 2008)
- Interactive map of Bantry, North Dakota
- Location within North Dakota
- Coordinates: 48.4943°N 100.6147°W
- Country: United States
- State: North Dakota
- County: McHenry
- Founded: 1905
- Incorporated (village): August 3, 1948
- Incorporated (city): July 1, 1967
- Dissolved: November 2019

Area
  - Total: 0.932 sq mi (2.415 km^{2})
  - Land: 0.932 sq mi (2.415 km^{2})
  - Water: 0 sq mi (0.000 km^{2}) 0.00%
- Elevation: 1,467 ft (447 m)

Population (2020)
  - Total: 6
  - Estimate (2025): 6
  - Density: 6.4/sq mi (2.5/km^{2})
- Time zone: UTC–6 (Central (CST))
  - Summer (DST): UTC–5 (CDT)
- ZIP Code: 58713
- Area code: 701
- FIPS code: 38-04740
- GNIS feature ID: 2829872
- Highways: ND 14, CR 17

Bantry is a census-designated place and unincorporated community in McHenry County, North Dakota, United States. The population was 6 as of the 2020 census, and was estimated at 44 in 2025.

It is part of the Minot micropolitan area.

== History ==
Bantry was founded in 1905. Bantry was founded by Irish settlers. The City of Bantry dissolved in November 2019 and the area reverted to Bantry township.

== Geography ==
According to the United States Census Bureau, the CDP has a total area of 0.932 square miles (2.41 km^{2}), all land.

== Climate ==
This climatic region is typified by large seasonal temperature differences, with warm to hot (and often humid) summers and cold (sometimes severely cold) winters. According to the Köppen Climate Classification system, Bantry has a humid continental climate, abbreviated "Dfb" on climate maps.

== Demographics ==
Historical population
Census	Pop.	Note	%±
1950	125		—
1960	66		−47.2%
1970	40		−39.4%
1980	28		−30.0%
1990	16		−42.9%
2000	19		18.8%
2010	14		−26.3%
2020	6		−57.1%
2025 (est.)	6		0.0%
U.S. Decennial Census; 2020 Census

As of the 2024 American Community Survey, there were 3 estimated households in Bantry with an average of 1.67 persons per household. The CDP has a median household income of $0. Approximately 0.0% of the CDP's population lives at or below the poverty line. Bantry has an estimated 60.0% employment rate, with 33.3% of the population holding a bachelor's degree or higher and 100.0% holding a high school diploma. There were 3 housing units at an average density of 3.22 per square mile (1.2/km^{2}).

The top five reported languages (people were allowed to report up to two languages, thus the figures will generally add to more than 100%) were English (100.0%), Spanish (0.0%), Indo-European (0.0%), Asian and Pacific Islander (0.0%), and Other (0.0%).

The median age in the CDP was 54.5 years.

=== 2020 census ===
As of the 2020 census, there were 6 people, 5 households, and 2 families residing in the CDP. The population density was 34.48 inhabitants per square mile (13.3/km^{2}). There were 7 housing units at an average density of 40.23 per square mile (15.5/km^{2}). The racial makeup of the CDP was 100.00% White.

=== 2010 census ===
As of the 2010 census, there were 14 people, 7 households, and 4 families residing in the city. The population density was 81.87 inhabitants per square mile (31.6/km^{2}). There were 8 housing units at an average density of 46.78 per square mile (18.1/km^{2}). The racial makeup of the city was 100.0% White.

There were 7 households, of which 28.6% had children under the age of 18 living with them, 42.9% were married couples living together, 14.3% had a female householder with no husband present, and 42.9% were non-families. 28.6% of all households were made up of individuals. The average household size was 2.00 and the average family size was 2.50.

The median age in the city was 37.5 years. 21.4% of residents were under the age of 18; 7% were between the ages of 18 and 24; 35.7% were from 25 to 44; 21.4% were from 45 to 64; and 14.3% were 65 years of age or older. The gender makeup of the city was 57.1% male and 42.9% female.

=== 2000 census ===
As of the 2000 census, there were 19 people, 11 households, and 4 families residing in the city. The population density was 115.59 inhabitants per square mile (44.6/km^{2}). There were 11 housing units at an average density of 66.92 per square mile (25.8/km^{2}). The racial makeup of the city was 100.00% White.

There were 11 households, out of which 9.1% had children under the age of 18 living with them, 9.1% were married couples living together, 27.3% had a female householder with no husband present, and 63.6% were non-families. 54.5% of all households were made up of individuals, and 9.1% had someone living alone who was 65 years of age or older. The average household size was 1.73 and the average family size was 2.50.

In the city, the population was spread out, with 15.8% under the age of 18, 21.1% from 18 to 24, 21.1% from 25 to 44, 31.6% from 45 to 64, and 10.5% who were 65 years of age or older. The median age was 36 years. For every 100 females, there were 280.0 males. For every 100 females age 18 and over, there were 220.0 males.

The median income for a household in the city was $13,750, and the median income for a family was $19,167. Males had a median income of $23,750 versus $11,250 for females. The per capita income for the city was $12,696. There are 25.0% of families living below the poverty line and 21.4% of the population, including no under eighteens and 100.0% of those over 64.

== Notable person ==
- Vernon Robert Pearson, Chief Justice of the Washington Supreme Court
