= Merritt J. Gordon =

American judge (1857–1925)

Merritt J. Gordon (March 17, 1859 – June 5, 1925) was a justice of the Washington Supreme Court from 1895 to 1900.

== Education, and career ==
Born in Franklin, Canada East, Gordon attended the public schools of Clinton County, New York, later entering the Champlain Academy, from which he graduated in 1878. In 1879 he moved to Lanesboro, Minnesota, and at the age of 20 entered one of the leading law offices. He was admitted to practice in Fillmore County, Minnesota, in 1880, and in 1881 moved to Aberdeen, South Dakota, where he became a prominent figure in city and county affairs. He served as city attorney of Aberdeen and district attorney of the fifth district and was chairman of the judiciary committee of the first South Dakota House of Representatives in 1889. In 1890 he moved to the state of Washington, settling in Olympia.

== Judicial career and later life ==
In 1895, Gordon was appointed to the superior court of Thurston County, Washington, by Governor Elisha P. Ferry. Later that year he was elected to a four year term, but resigned to seek the nomination to the state supreme court, to a seat vacated by the retirement of Judge Theodore L. Stiles. Gordon was elected, taking office in January 1895. He served for five and half years, including one year as chief justice, before resigning to become counsel for the Great Northern Railway Company. He moved to Spokane where he resided until 1908, when he moved to Tacoma.

In April 1909, Gordon was indicted on a charge of embezzling over $9,000 from the Great Northern Railway Company, but was acquitted in March 2010.

He thereafter continued his law practice, in which he was "retained as counsel in many of the most famous cases in the state". In 1917 he was at the head of firm of Gordon & Easterday, and later formed a law partnership with Grover Nolte, though by 1921 he was in a solo practice, in which he remained for the rest of his life.

== Personal life and death ==
Gordon married Jennie Thompson in Carbondale, Pennsylvania, in 1879, with whom he had a son and a daughter. Jennie died in 1922, and Gordon later married Minnie Bergeson of Tacoma.

Gordan was killed by a runaway car that plowed through a crowd of shoppers in Tacoma; a woman was also killed in the accident, and five other shoppers were injured.

Political offices
Preceded by Theodore L. Stiles	Justice of the Washington Supreme Court; 1895–1900	Succeeded by William H. White
