= Elmon Scott =

American judge (1853–1921)

Elmon Scott (November 6, 1853 – September 1921) was an associate justice and chief justice of the Washington Supreme Court from 1889 to 1899.

== Early life, education, and career ==
Born at Isle La Motte, in Grand Isle County, Vermont, to Anson and Ann B. Scott, he moved with parents to Michigan in 1864. He studied law in Charlotte, Michigan, where he was admitted to the bar in 1877. Scott was city attorney there for one term, moving to Washington in 1881, and to Pomeroy, Washington, in 1882. He was elected mayor of Pomeroy several terms.

== Judicial service and later life ==
In 1889, Scott was elected to the state supreme court. He moved to Whatcom, Washington (later Bellingham), and was reelected in 1892 and became chief justice in 1897. After serving for over nine years on the court, he declined renomination in 1899. Following his service on the court, Scott resumed the private practice of law.

On July 25, 1901, Scott was arrested for sexual assault on Monna Schaeffer, a 15-year-old girl in Whatcom. Scott was brought before a local judge and released on two thousand dollars cash bail. At trial, however, Scott's defense "identified five letters that she wrote to a neighbor next door, in one of which she says that Judge Scott was never guilty of the charges made against him and that her mother had forced her to swear to the charge", and another in which "she asks this neighbor to please to tell Mrs. Scott that she has lied about the judge". Scott was found not guilty of the charge. In July 1907, it was reported that Scott was conducting an experiment with gas-pump irrigation of 1,000 acres of property that he owned on the Snake River near Pomeroy.

== Personal life and death ==
Scott married Eleanor McBrearty on October 23, 1882, with whom he had a son, Ethan.

Scott fell seriously ill following an operation for appendicitis in San Francisco, California, on August 29, 1921, where Scott died in 1921, at the age of 67.

Political offices
| Preceded by Newly established court | Justice of the Washington Supreme Court; 1889–1899 | Succeeded by Mark A. Fullerton |
