= Theodore L. Stiles =

American judge (1848–1925)

Justice of the Washington Supreme Court
- In office November 11, 1889 – January 14, 1895
- Preceded by: Newly established court
- Succeeded by: Merritt J. Gordon

Personal details
- Born: 1848
- Died: 1925 (aged 76–77)
- Party: Republican
- Education: Amherst College; Columbia Law School
- Occupation: Politician, lawyer, judge

Theodore L. Stiles (1848–1925) was one of the first Justices of the Washington Supreme Court. He served on the court from Monday, November 11, 1889 to Monday, January 14, 1895. Before serving on the court, he was a delegate to the 1889 Constitutional Convention. Justice Stiles played a leading role at the constitutional convention, chairing the committee on county, township, and municipal organizations while also serving on the rules, judiciary, and public lands committees. He is often cited for his criticism of the Progressive Era and expansive interpretation of state "police powers":

Laws have been passed in one state and another abridging the right of contract, the right to sell merchandise, the right to labor upon public works, the right to labor more than a certain number of hours, the right to freely come and go, the right to pursue legitimate trades, and a mass of others. Some of these laws go directly to the point, but the majority proceed by indirection. Too many succeed in evading the decree of unconstitutionality and bear oppressively on natural rights. The selfish interest of classes ever anxious to push on their own fortunes, reckless of what destruction is wrought to others, is their moving cause. Legislatures, pliantly serviceable to the demands of influential cliques and unchecked by weak-kneed governors, spread them on the statute books, and there they stand, discouraging prophecies of the decadence of popular rights under democracy. They hide in swarms, behind the newly coined phrase, "police power," and that other more venerable phrase, "the public welfare," both of which, like "public policy," are often, if one may use such an expression, liveries of heaven stolen to serve the devil in.

Stiles resigned from the court as of January 12, 1895 to return to the private practice of law in Tacoma.

Political offices
Preceded by Newly established court	Justice of the Washington Supreme Court; 1889–1895	Succeeded by Merritt J. Gordon
