= Vernon Robert Pearson =

American judge

The Honorable Vernon Robert Pearson

Justice of the Washington Supreme Court
- In office 1982 – 1989
- Appointed by: Governor John Spellman
- Preceded by: Floyd Hicks
- Succeeded by: Richard P. Guy

Personal details
- Born: September 17, 1923 Bantry, North Dakota, U.S.
- Died: February 4, 2013 (aged 89) Gig Harbor, Washington, U.S.
- Education: Jamestown College (BA), University of Michigan Law School (LLB)
- Occupation: judge

Vernon Robert Pearson (September 17, 1923 – February 4, 2013) was an American jurist.

== Biography ==
Born in Bantry, North Dakota, Pearson served four years in the U.S. Navy prior to graduating from Jamestown College in 1947. He received his law degree from University of Michigan Law School in 1950.

From 1951 to 1952, he was attorney-advisor for the federal Economic Stabilization Agency in Seattle, working for William J. Steinert, a former justice of the state Supreme Court. Afterwards, Pearson engaged in the private practice of law with Davies, Pearson, Anderson and Pearson in Tacoma. In 1963, Pearson served as president of the Tacoma-Pierce County Bar Association, and was elected a governor of the Washington State Bar Association in 1969, before being appointed to the appellate court.

Pearson was appointed by Governor Daniel J. Evans to the newly created Washington Court of Appeals in 1969. Pearson authored the first Court of Appeals opinion in the initial volume of the appellate reports, State v. Tate, 1 Wn. App. 1 (1969).

In 1982, Governor John Spellman appointed Pearson as an associate justice of the Washington Supreme Court. He served as an associate justice from 1982 to 1987, having been named Acting Chief Justice in 1985, and then chief justice from 1987 to 1989.

He died in Gig Harbor, Washington.

== Selected publications ==
- Pearson, Vernon R.; O'Neill, Michael (1986). "The First Amendment, Commercial Speech, and the Advertising Lawyer", 9 Seattle U. L. Rev. 293.

Political offices
Preceded by Floyd Hicks	Justice of the Washington Supreme Court; 1982–1989	Succeeded by Richard P. Guy
