= Chester Ralph Hovey =

American judge (1872–1953)

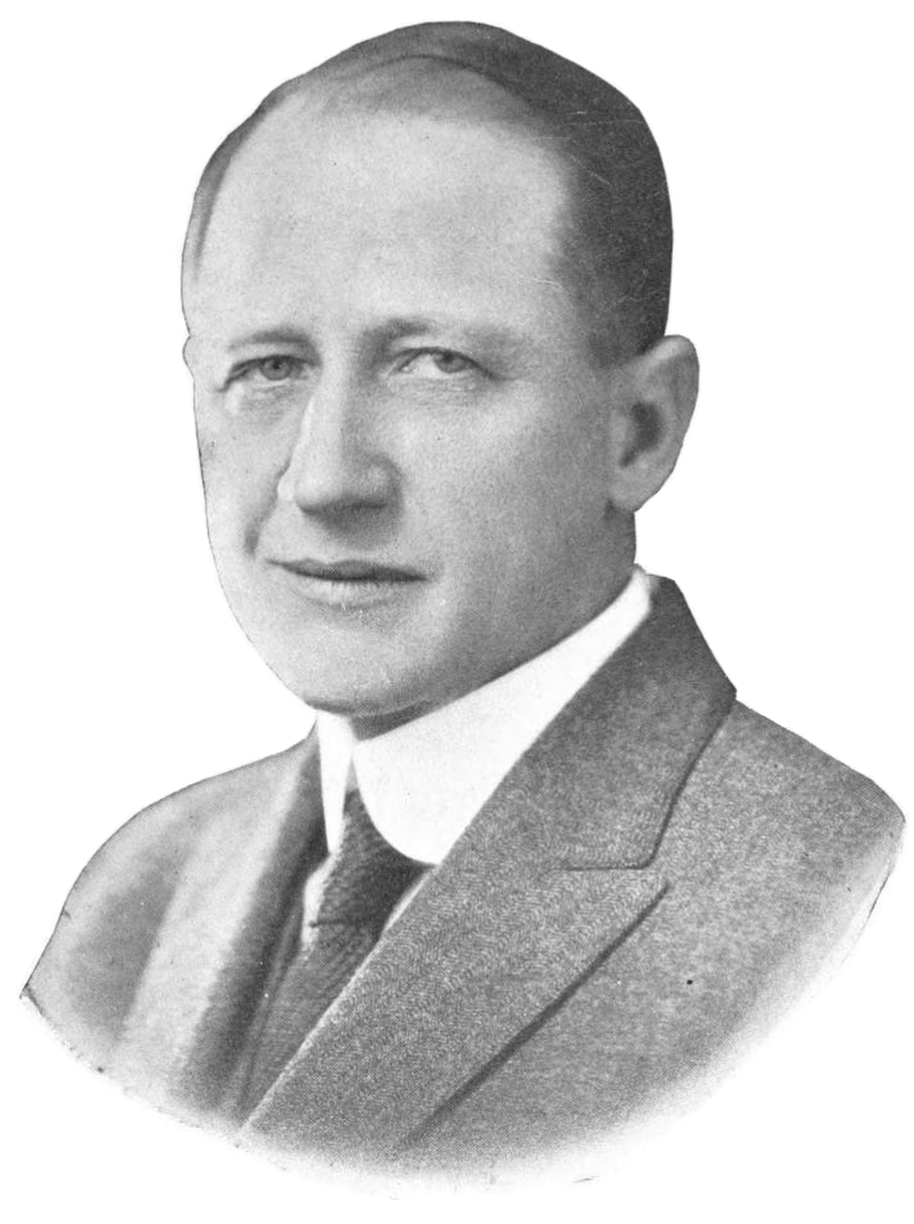
Chester Ralph Hovey as President of the Washington State Bar Association in 1921, the same year that he was appointed to the Washington Supreme Court.

Chester Ralph Hovey (January 21, 1872 – November 9, 1953) was a justice of the Washington Supreme Court from 1921 to 1923.

== Early life, education, and career ==
Born in Holyoke, Massachusetts, Hovey attended public high school in Durand, Wisconsin, graduating in 1888, and thereafter moving to Ellensburg, Washington. He "worked odd jobs and in a grocery store, studying law at night with Judge Ralph Kauffman", in Kittitas County, Washington. In 1893, Hovey was admitted to the bar, and "at once entered the practice of his profession in Ellensburg". Hovey was elected prosecuting attorney of Kittitas County from 1899 to 1901 and from 1910 to 1912. When he was not holding this office, he served as Ellensburg City Attorney, developing expertise in water rights and irrigation law.

== Judicial career ==
Hovey was elected President of the Washington State Bar Association in July 1921, but resigned on September 7, 1921, the date that he was appointed to the Washington Supreme Court by Governor Louis Hart. Hovey was unsuccessful in attempting to retain his seat in an election in 1923. Hovey then moved to Seattle, and established a new law practice, eventually being elected president of the Seattle Bar Association in 1929.

== Personal life ==
Hovey married Grace J. Painter in 1895, with whom he had two children, a son named Joseph and a daughter named Ann. He was a member of the Elks' club and Chamber of Commerce, of Ellensburg.

Political offices
Preceded by Wallace Mount	Justice of the Washington Supreme Court; 1921–1923	Succeeded by William H. Pemberton
