= Oscar Raymond Holcomb =

American judge (1869–1948)

The Honorable Oscar Raymond Holcomb

Justice of the Washington Supreme Court
- In office January 1, 1915 – January 1, 1927
- Preceded by: Herman D. Crow
- Succeeded by: Walter M. French

Justice of the Washington Supreme Court
- In office March 1, 1927 – January 1, 1939
- Appointed by: Governor Roland H. Hartley
- Preceded by: Jesse B. Bridges
- Succeeded by: Clyde G. Jeffers

Commissioner of Arid Lands of the State of Washington
- In office March 1, 1897 – January 1, 1901
- Appointed by: Governor John R. Rogers

Personal details
- Born: December 31, 1869 Gibson County, Indiana, U.S.
- Died: September 14, 1948 (aged 78) Tacoma, Washington, U.S.
- Spouse: Eva Staser
- Children: 4
- Education: Southwestern Indiana Normal School (BA); Chicago College of Law (LLB)
- Occupation: Lawyer, judge

Oscar Raymond Holcomb (December 31, 1869 – September 14, 1948) was an American lawyer, and justice of the Washington Supreme Court from 1915 to 1927, and again from 1927 to 1939. Defeated in a bid for reelection in 1926, Holcomb's term expired early in 1927. Within several months, he was appointed to the vacancy caused by the death of Justice Jesse B. Bridges. Holcomb served as chief justice of the Court from 1919 to 1921.

== Early life and education ==
Holcomb was born in Gibson County, Indiana, to Mary Ann Hopkins (1840–1917) and Silas Mercer Holcomb (1838–1906), an attorney. Holcomb attended the public schools in Fort Branch, Indiana, and enrolled in Southwestern Indiana Normal School, at Princeton, Indiana. After graduation, he attended the Chicago College of Law and received his LL.B. degree in 1892.

== Legal and judicial career ==
Following law school, Holcomb engaged in private practice in Evansville, Indiana, before moving to Tacoma, Washington, in March 1894, and then in April 1894 to Ritzville, where he lived for the next for 15 years. He held a series of public offices. He was Prosecuting Attorney for Adams County from March 1895 to 1898, and then served as Commissioner for Arid Lands for the State Washington, 1898–1901. He was a City Councilman of Ritzville, Washington, for several terms; and was a member of the school board and the county electrical utility. In 1902, he unsuccessfully ran for Congress as a Progressive Democrat. In 1908, he was elected judge of the state Superior Court for Adams, Franklin and Benton Counties, taking office in 1909, and was re-elected in 1912. From 1915 to 1939, Holcomb was a justice of the Washington state Supreme Court, with a short break in 1927. He served a two-year term as chief justice from 1919 to 1921.

In the 1914 election for the Supreme Court, the state Trades Council endorsed Holcomb. On the bench, he had a sympathetic ear for labor issues. In the case of St. Germain v. Bakery and Confectionery Workers' Union of Seattle (1917), the Supreme Court upheld in an 8–1 opinion an anti-picketing law, with Holcomb as the sole hold out.

== Personal life ==
On June 12, 1894, he married Eva Staser (1871–1934), and had four children. He died on September 14, 1948, and was buried at Tacoma Cemetery in Tacoma, Washington.

Political offices
Preceded by Herman D. Crow; Jesse B. Bridges	Justice of the Washington Supreme Court; 1915–1939	Succeeded by Walter M. French; Clyde G. Jeffers
