= Walter M. French =

American judge (1874–1930)

The Honorable Walter M. French

Justice of the Washington Supreme Court
- In office 1927 – 1930
- Preceded by: Oscar Raymond Holcomb
- Succeeded by: Adam Beeler

Personal details
- Born: January 30, 1874 Branch, Michigan
- Died: September 13, 1930 (aged 56) Olympia, Washington
- Education: Hillsdale College, BA, University of Washington School of Law, LLB
- Occupation: judge

Walter Melville French (January 1874 – September 13, 1930) was an American attorney who served as a Washington State Supreme Court Justice from 1927 to 1930.

== Biography ==
Walter French was born in Branch, Michigan, to Ezekial Inman French, a produce dealer, and Martha Mattie Mitchell. In 1896, French graduated from Hillsdale College and, in 1901, the inaugural class of the University of Washington School of Law (along with classmates Walter B. Beals and Vivian Carkeek).

After graduation, French lived in Seattle and practiced law in the firm of Allen & French. By 1910, he resided on Bainbridge Island, Kitsap County. In 1912, French was elected to the Kitsap County Superior Court.

In 1918, he ran for the Supreme Court against an incumbent, but lost. In November 1926, French, now residing in Tacoma, won election to the Supreme Court. He served three years, until his death on September 13, 1930.

On April 12, 1904, he married Bessie Westlake Carkeek (born January 16, 1879-died February 15, 1967), a cousin of his classmate Vivian Carkeek.

Legal offices
Preceded by Oscar Raymond Holcomb	Associate Justice of the Washington Supreme Court; 1927-1930	Succeeded by Adam Beeler
