= Charles Horowitz (judge) =

American judge (1905–1989)

Charles Horowitz (January 5, 1905 – March 25, 1989) was a justice of the Washington Supreme Court from 1975 to 1980.

== Education and career ==
Born in Brooklyn, New York, Horowitz received a B.A. from the University of Washington in 1932, and an LL.B. from the same institution in 1927, also serving as president of the editorial board of the Washington Law Review. He received an M.A. in Jurisprudence from the University of Oxford in 1952, where he was a Rhodes Scholar.

Horowitz was appointed to the Washington State Court of Appeals, Division I, in 1969. In 1974, he was elected to the state supreme court, assuming office the following year. He retired in 1980, and returned to private practice until the month before his death.

== Personal life ==
On March 23, 1930, Horowitz married Diana Glickman, with whom he had two daughters. He died in Seattle at the age of 84.

Political offices
Preceded by Frank Hale	Justice of the Washington Supreme Court; 1975–1980	Succeeded by Fred H. Dore
