= Othilia Carroll Beals =

American judge (1875–1970)

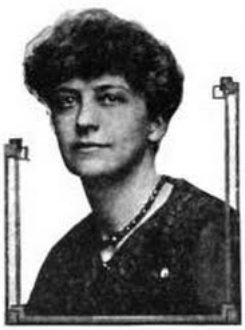
Othilia Carroll Beals (1918)

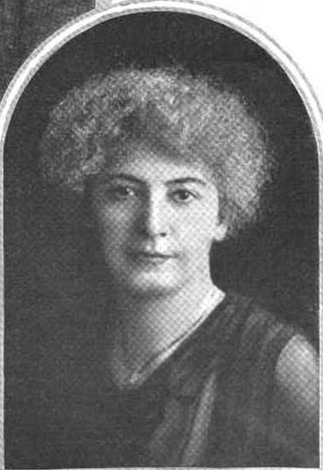
Othilia Carroll Beals, from a 1920 publication.

Othilia Gertrude Carroll Beals (October 25, 1875 — May 23, 1970) was an American lawyer and judge. She was one of the first two women to graduate from the University of Washington Law School, and to practice law in Seattle, Washington.

== Early life ==
Othilia Gertrude Carroll was born in New Orleans, Louisiana, the daughter of Patrick P. Carroll and Sarah Jane Talbott Carroll. Her father was born in Ireland. The family moved to Washington when Othilia was a small child. In 1901, she was in the first graduating class at the University of Washington Law School, and the first woman to graduate from that school (a female classmate, Bella Weretnikow, also graduated that day). She also studied violin at the University of Washington.

== Career ==
Othilia Carroll was editor of the journal Pacific Catholic in 1901. After law school, Carroll went to New Orleans and was active in the movement for women's suffrage. She joined her father and brother in a law practice in Seattle until she married in 1904. In April 1917, Othilia was appointed as a Justice of the Peace in Seattle, filling the seat left when her brother joined the army during World War I. She was regularly elected to the bench soon after, in 1918. One of her accomplishments in the law was to establish a small claims court in the state of Washington. She announced her retirement from the bench in 1920.

In 1927, she went to Paris as part of General John J. Pershing's "goodwill tour" of Europe, because she was a national vice-president of the American Legion Auxiliary. In 1928, she chaired the Ladies' Committee of the American Bar Association's annual meeting in Seattle. She was president of the University of Washington Alumnae Association, and a founder of both the Seattle Fruit and Flower Mission, and the Seattle Milk Fund.

== Personal life ==
Othilia Carroll married Walter B. Beals, a law school classmate, in 1904. She was widowed in 1960, and died in 1970, aged 94 years. The house they lived in, Westhillsyde in Olympia, Washington, was designed by architects Elizabeth Ayer and Edwin Ivey, and it is part of the Olympia Women's History Walking Tour.
