= Samuel B. Hill (Washington politician) =

American politician (1875–1958)

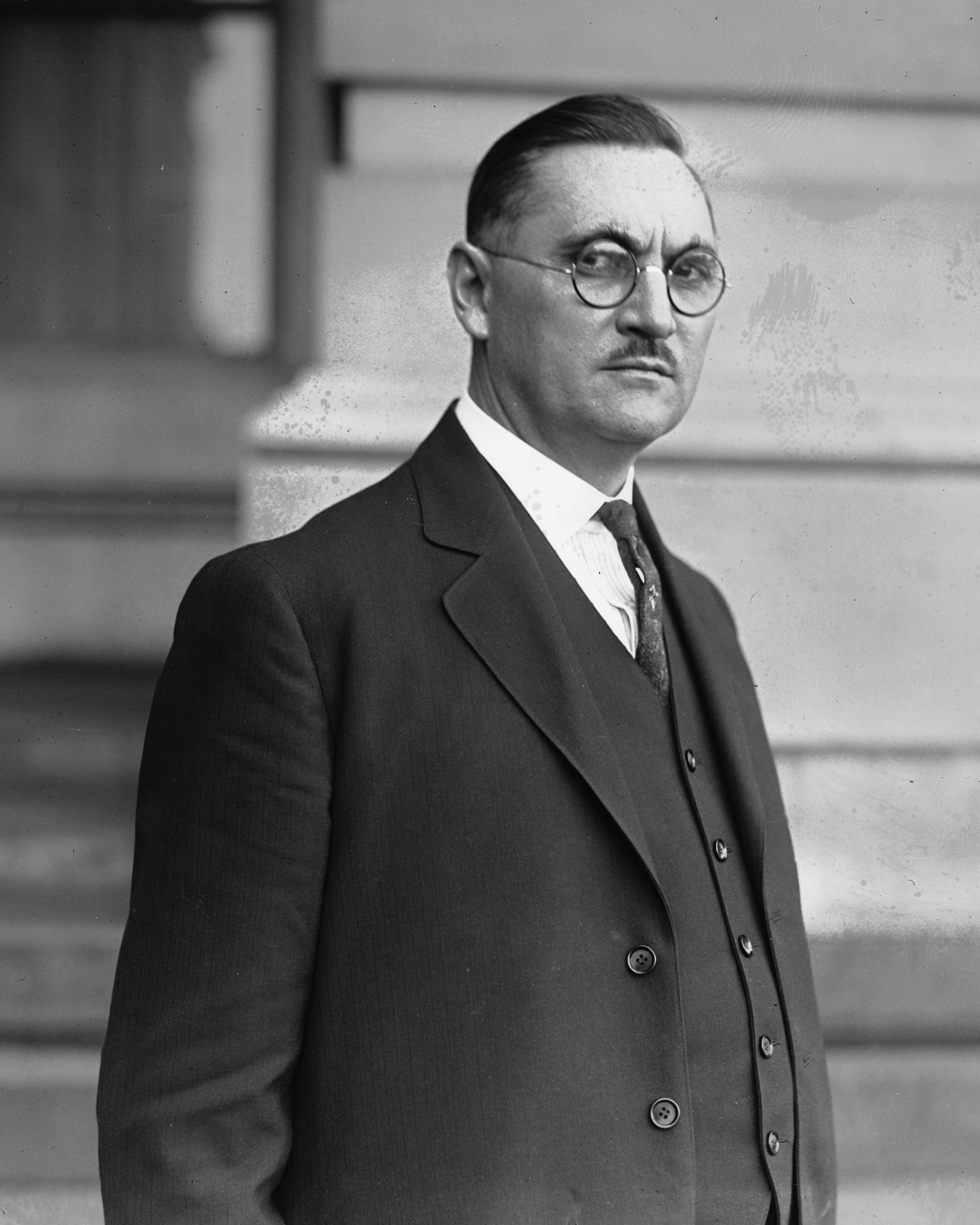
- From the January 17, 1934 edition of the Bryan Daily Eagle (Bryan, TX)

Member of the U.S. House of Representatives from Washington's 5th district
- In office September 25, 1923 – June 25, 1936
- Preceded by: J. Stanley Webster
- Succeeded by: Charles H. Leavy

Personal details
- Born: Samuel Billingsley Hill; April 2, 1875 Franklin, Arkansas, U.S.
- Died: March 16, 1958 (aged 82) Bethesda, Maryland, U.S.
- Resting place: Rock Creek Cemetery, Washington, D.C., U.S.
- Party: Democratic
- Education: University of Arkansas Law
- Profession: Judge; lawyer; politician

Samuel Billingsley Hill (April 2, 1875 – March 16, 1958), was a lawyer, mayor, and U.S. congressman from eastern Washington.

Born in Franklin, Arkansas, Hill attended the common schools, the University of Arkansas at Fayetteville, and was graduated from its law department in 1898. While at the University of Arkansas, he was a member of Xi chapter of Kappa Sigma fraternity.

Hill was admitted to the bar the same year and commenced practice in Danville, Arkansas. While living in Danville, the young Hill served as Mayor and was also Chairman of the Democratic Central Committee of Yell County, Arkansas. It was in Danville where Hill also began his pursuit of development of rural areas. In 1899, Hill, J.E. Wooten, and John McCarthy established the Danville Turnpike Company.

He moved west to Waterville in eastern Washington in 1904 and continued the practice of law. Hill served as prosecuting attorney of Douglas County 1907–1911, and served as judge of the superior court for Douglas and Grant Counties 1917–1924.

Hill was elected as a Democrat to the Sixty-eighth Congress to fill the vacancy caused by the resignation of J. Stanley Webster. During his time in the House of Representatives, Hill advocated for the funding of the Grand Coulee Dam. He was called the "Political Father of the Grand Coulee Project" by the Wenatchee Dispatch.

He was reelected to the Sixty-ninth and to the five succeeding Congresses and served from September 25, 1923, until his resignation, effective June 25, 1936, having been confirmed as a member of the United States Board of Tax Appeals (now the United States Tax Court) on May 21, 1936, serving as a judge on the court until his retirement November 30, 1953. He died in Bethesda, Maryland, March 16, 1958. He was interred in Rock Creek Cemetery, Washington, D.C.

== Sources ==
- United States Congress. "Samuel B. Hill (id: H000607)". Biographical Directory of the United States Congress.

U.S. House of Representatives
Preceded by J. Stanley Webster	Member of the U.S. House of Representatives from Washington's 5th congressional district 1923–1936	Succeeded by Charles H. Leavy
