= Johnson T. Crawford =

American judge (1889–1955)

The Honorable Johnson Tal Crawford
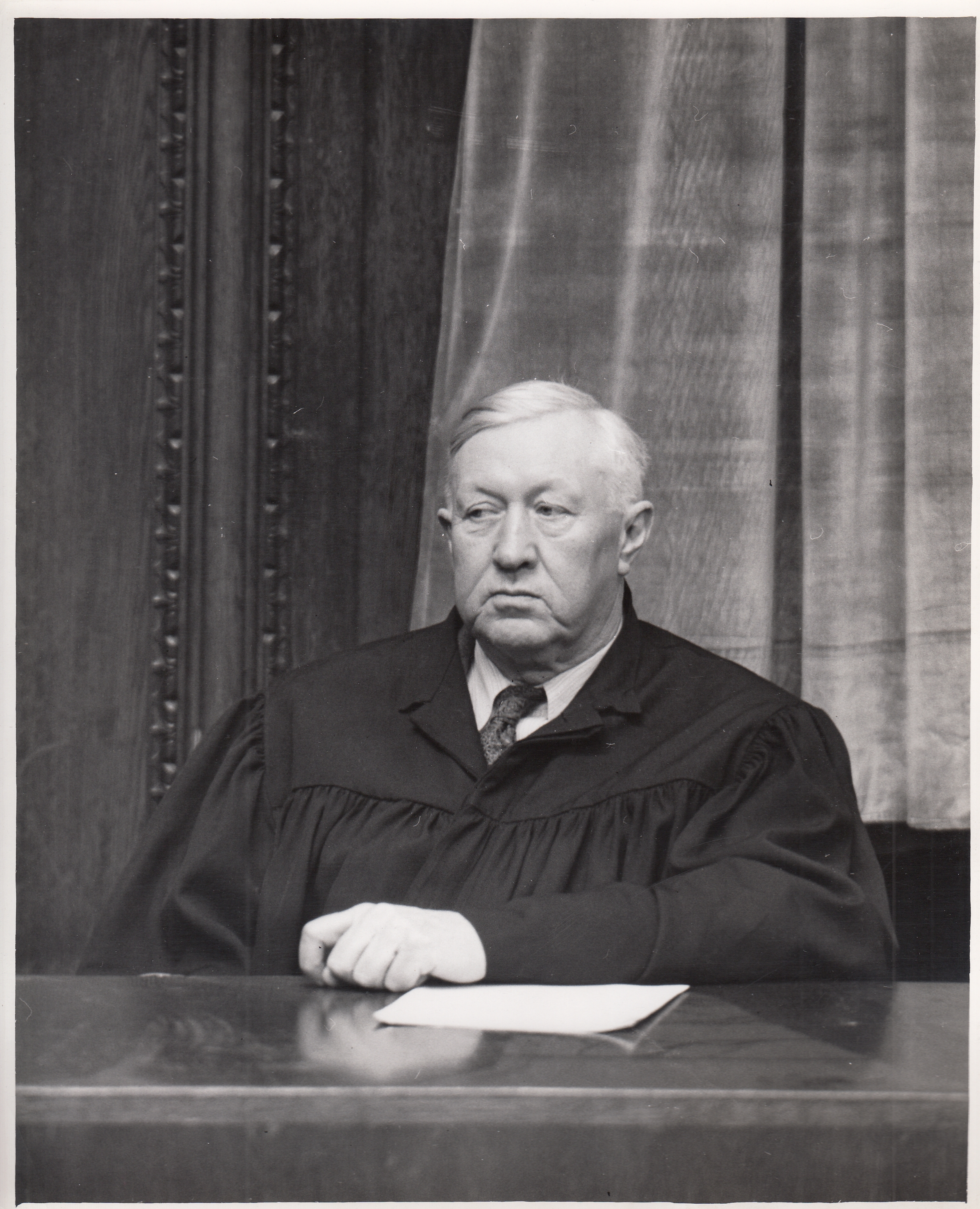

Circuit Judge of the Oklahoma District Court of Appeals
- In office 1936 – 1946

Personal details
- Born: August 31, 1889 Washington County, Arkansas, US
- Died: January 1, 1955 (aged 65)
- Spouse: Jessie Frank Rogers
- Children: Talicia Diane Crawford
- Occupation: Judge

Johnson Tal Crawford (31 August 1889 – 1 January 1955) was an American lawyer and jurist. He was a district judge in Pontotoc County, Oklahoma, United States from 1936 to 1946. In the Subsequent Nuremberg Trials, he co-judged both the Doctors' Trial and the RuSHA Trial. The collective judgement from the Doctors' Trial led to the establishment of the Nuremberg Code.

== Early life ==
Johnson Tal Crawford was born 31 August 1889 in Washington County, Arkansas.

He received his law degree from Oklahoma University.

He met Jessie Frank Rogers, one of the daughters of Robert E. Rogers and his wife (m. 12 October 1875 in Milton County, Georgia) Mary Avarilla Cogburn (1858–1916), and a sister of Phillip Henry Rogers (b. 23 September 1877) when she was a stenographer at the county courthouse in Ada, Oklahoma. They married on 3 July 1923 at the Central Presbyterian Church, then on South Travis Street at the NE corner of Cherry Street, Sherman, Grayson County, Texas. Jessie had also previously worked as a secretary for her brother-in-law Wallie, a local general practice physician.

== District Judge ==
He was a judge from about 1924 then presiding judge at the District Court of Oklahoma in Ada, Pontotoc County, Oklahoma from 1936 to 1946, a court with general jurisdiction over almost all civil and criminal matters within its sphere of influence. To be able to go to Nuremberg he resigned from the district court, but hoped to return to Ada to practice law following the war crimes tribunals. Like the other potential justices, he requested permission for his family to accompany him.

== Nuremberg Military Tribunal Judge ==
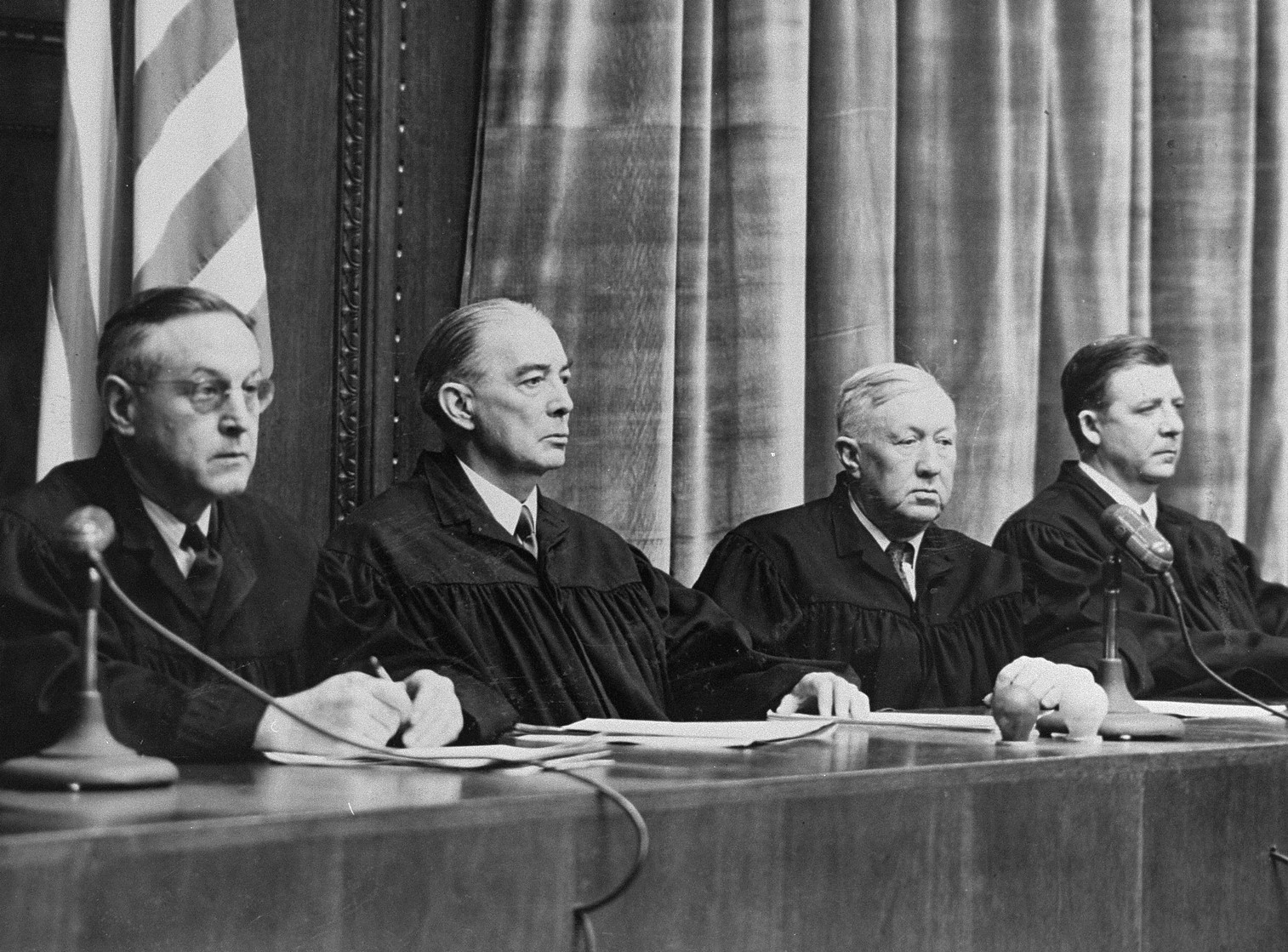
The Nuremberg Military Tribunal, 1946. From left to right: Harold L. Sebring, Walter B. Beals, Johnson T. Crawford, and Victor C. Swearingen.

Following the end of major hostilities in World War II, he was appointed as a member of Military Tribunal I by U.S. President Harry S. Truman. As a member of Military Tribunal I, as part of the Subsequent Nuremberg Trials at Nuremberg, he judged both the Doctors' trial (along with Walter B. Beals, Harold Sebring, and Lt. Col. Victor C. Swearingen) and the RuSHA Trial.

== Legacy ==
The collective judgement from the Doctors' Trial led to the establishment of the Nuremberg Code, a set of research ethics principles for human experimentation. The trials were pivotal in the development of international human rights and bioethics. His papers are held in the Linscheid Library of East Central University.

== Family life ==
He was informally known by his middle name "Tal" and his wife Jessie Frank as "Jess". Their daughter Talicia Diane Crawford (30 March 1924 in Ada, Oklahoma - 25 September 2000 in Great Falls, Virginia), married George Fitzgerald Smoot Jr. on 14 July 1943 in Escambia County, Florida, and had issue including:

- George Fitzgerald Smoot III (b. 20 February 1945)
