= Emmett N. Parker =

American judge (1859–1939)

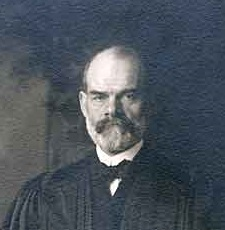
Justice Emmett Parker of the 1910 Washington Supreme Court.

Emmett Newton Parker (1859 – December 8, 1939) was a justice of the Washington Supreme Court from 1909 to 1933.

Born in York County, Pennsylvania, Parker attended the common schools of his native county and then received an LL.B. from the Cincinnati Law School in 1882. In 1888, he moved to Tacoma, Washington and engaged in the practice of law. About two years later he was made judge of the Municipal Court of that city, serving until 1892. In 1893 he became a judge of the Pierce County Superior court and remained in that capacity until 1897. In 1900 and 1901 he served Tacoma as City Attorney. In 1909, Governor Marion E. Hay appointed Parker and George E. Morris to two newly-created seats on the Washington Supreme Court. Parker became chief justice in 1921. Parker retired from the court in 1933.

In 1884, Parker married Emma Garretson, with whom he had a son and three daughters. Parker died in Tacoma at the age of 80.

Political offices
Preceded by Newly established seat.	Justice of the Washington Supreme Court; 1909–1933	Succeeded by James M. Geraghty
