= Joseph A. Mallery =

American judge

Joseph A. Mallery (c. 1896 – 1982) was one of the few ideological conservatives to be elected and re-elected to the Washington Supreme Court- or to any other elected office in Washington.

== Biography ==
Mallery, a former trial and prosecuting attorney and Pierce County Superior Court Judge, was elected in an upset to the Supreme Court in 1942 while on the Pierce Co. bench. John F. Main, the incumbent, attempted to withdraw because of illness, but was forced to remain on the November 3, 1942 General Election ballot by a Court decision denying the #3 candidate in the primary, the right to replace Main in the race. (Mallery and Main each obtained about 30% in a four-candidate Sept. 8, 1942 "jungle" primary for non-partisan office.) Mallery is best remembered today for a series of controversial rulings against state anti-discrimination laws in WA targeting private businesses (RCW 49.60), including e.g. Browning v. Slenderella Systems, 54 Wn.2d 440, 453, 341 P.2d 859 (1959), where a dissenting Justice Mallery and one other justice, voted to deny recovery for the tort of emotional distress against a dentist's wife (Browning), alleged barred from a Seattle salon because of her race. Mallery, who evidently became more conservative later in life, also ruled against a black family in Seattle, in a case decided by the Court on other grounds (Price v. Evergreen Cemeteries, 57 Wn. 2d 352, 355, 357 P.2d 702 ), seeking compensation from Evergreen Cemeteries in North Seattle for denying their young son who drowned entry to the then all-white "Babyland" section of the largest Seattle cemetery. For this, Mallery was targeted for defeat by a "Seattle lawyer and the NAACP" (second case cited, at 57 Wn. 2d 355, 357 P. 2d 702), but still was re-elected on Nov. 8, 1960. (Mallery was also censured by Jet magazine (Dec. 22, 1960) for his opinion.) Apparently disgusted by the personal attacks against him, Mallery suddenly retired from the Court in Jan. 1962, leaving little ideological trace on Washington's highest court today, which has now repudiated his concurrence in Price. A Mallery collection has been set up at the Tacoma branch of the University of Washington.

== Repudiation by Supreme Court in 2020 ==
On October 15, 2020, the Washington State Supreme Court overruled Price v. Evergreen Cemeteries, stating that the original opinion, in part, was "harmful because of Justice Mallery's concurrence, which condemns civil rights and legislation. [citation omitted] 'As judges, we must recognize the role we have played in devaluing black lives.' Letter from Wash. State Supreme Court to Members of the Judiciary and the Legal Cmty. 1 (June 4, 2020) (addressing racial injustice). The Price concurrence is an example of the unfortunate role we have played".
