= Edward M. Connelly =

American judge (1892–1947)

The Honorable Edward M. Connelly

Justice of the Washington Supreme Court
- In office 1946 – 1947
- Preceded by: Bruce Blake
- Succeeded by: Matthew W. Hill

Personal details
- Born: September 8, 1892 Bellingham, Washington, U.S.
- Died: August 31, 1947 (aged 54) Spokane, Washington, U.S.
- Spouse: Grace E. Connelly
- Education: Gonzaga University (BA, LLB)
- Occupation: Lawyer, judge

Edward Michael Connelly (September 8, 1892 – August 31, 1947) was a federal prosecutor and justice of the Washington Supreme Court from 1946 to 1947. He was appointed to the Supreme Court by Governor Monrad Wallgren, and served less than one year. In 1946, he was defeated in the election, losing to King County Superior Court judge Matthew W. Hill. After leaving the court, Connelly returned to private practice in Spokane, Washington.

Connelly was born in Bellingham, Washington, to Patrick E. Connelly and Elizabeth Murphy, and attended grade school there. When his family moved to Spokane, he enrolled in Gonzaga University, graduating in 1912. He was in the first graduating class at Gonzaga Law School, receiving a LL.B. degree in 1915. In 1921, he taught property law at Gonzaga University Law School. From 1922 to 1926, he worked as a Deputy Prosecuting Attorney for Spokane County Prosecuting Attorney, Charles H. Leavy. In private practice, he was renowned as a trial lawyer. Connelly served as United States District Attorney for the Eastern District of Washington from 1942 to 1946.

Political offices
Preceded by Bruce Blake	Justice; 1946–1947	Succeeded by Matthew W. Hill
