= Hugh J. Rosellini =

American judge (1909–1984)

The Honorable Hugh J. Rosellini

Justice of the Washington Supreme Court
- In office January 1, 1955 – November 26, 1984
- Succeeded by: Keith M. Callow

Member of the Washington House of Representatives from the 27th district
- In office 1939–1944

Personal details
- Born: June 16, 1909 Tacoma, Washington, U.S.
- Died: November 26, 1984 (aged 75) Tacoma, Washington, U.S.
- Party: Democratic
- Spouse: Yvonne Chrissy Lee
- Education: University of Puget Sound; University of Washington School of Law (LLB)
- Occupation: Lawyer, judge

Hugh J. Rosellini (June 16, 1909 – November 26, 1984) was an American lawyer, politician and justice of the Washington Supreme Court from 1955 to 1984, who also served as chief justice from 1965 to 1967.

== Early life and education ==
Rosellini was born and raised in Tacoma, the only child of immigrants from Chiesina, Italy. In 1927, he enrolled at the University of Puget Sound, and in 1929 switched to the University of Washington, following in the footsteps of his childhood friend and distant relative, Albert Rosellini, who later became governor. In 1933, he graduated with a LL.B. degree from the University of Washington School of Law.

== Legal career ==
After graduation, Rosellini entered private practice in Tacoma from 1933 to 1945. In 1938, Rosellini was elected to the state House of Representatives as a Democrat from the 27th District in Tacoma. In 1944, he ran unsuccessfully for Pierce County Prosecuting Attorney. In 1945, Governor Monrad Wallgren appointed Rosellini as judge on the Pierce County Superior Court. On the trial bench, he handled a range of civil and criminal cases, including the death penalty. In 1948, he sentenced to death convicted murderer, Jake Bird. In 1954, Judge Rosellini excused with good humor a 103-year old man summoned to jury service due to his age.

In 1950, he ran unsuccessfully for the state Supreme Court, losing to Frederick Hamley. In 1954, Rosellini ran again and was elected as justice of the Supreme Court, winning over Richard Ott, who joined the court a year later. In the 1966 election, Rosellini was challenged by Vaughn Evans but won re-election. Rosellini served as chief justice of the Supreme Court from January 11, 1965, to January 8, 1967.

Rosellini maintained wide intellectual interests, including Bar matters and international affairs. In September 1965, he delivered a speech at the regional meeting of the American Bar Association. In 1967, Rosellini participated in the Thirty-first American Assembly on the United States and Eastern Europe.

His notable cases include Spokane v. McDonough (1971), in which a student at a speech by Vice-President Spiro Agnew at Gonzaga University in 1968 was convicted of disorderly conduct for shouting out his opposition to the Vietnam War. The state Supreme Court reversed the conviction, and Rosellini wrote for the majority: "On such an occasion, where an open-air crowd is tacitly invited to demonstrate its approval of the speaker and his party through applause, cheers and friendly expletives, it is to be expected that those of opposing views in the audience are likely to convey vociferously their disapproval in an orderly but vocal way."

== Personal life ==
In 1938, he married Yvonne Chrissy Lee (May 8, 1914 – March 15, 1982), in Port Orchard, Washington. He died November 26, 1984, while still in office.

== Selected publications ==
- Rosellini, Hugh J. (1968). "Crisis in the Supreme Court" (PDF). Gonzaga Law Review. 3: 12.
- Court opinions authored by Hugh J. Rosellini. Courtlistener.org. Retrieved May 22, 2017.

Political offices
Preceded by	Justice of the Washington Supreme Court; 1955–1984	Succeeded by
