= Ralph O. Dunbar =

American judge (1845–1912)

Ralph Oregon Dunbar
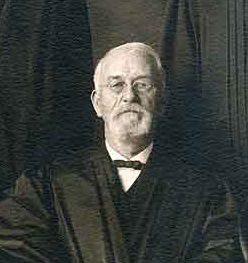
- Justice Dunbar on the 1910 Washington Supreme Court

Personal details
- Born: April 26, 1845 Schuyler County, Illinois
- Died: September 19, 1912 (aged 67) Olympia, Washington

Ralph Oregon Dunbar (April 26, 1845 – September 19, 1912) was a justice of the Washington Supreme Court from 1889 to 1912.

== Biography ==
Born in Schuyler County, Illinois, Dunbar's family crossed the plains in an ox-team during his infancy and settled near Salem, Oregon. Dunbar attended Willamette University, also teaching there for two years while still a student, and then moved to Olympia, Washington in 1867, reading law with Judge Elwood Evans to gain admission to the bar in that state in 1869.

Dunbar served as Speaker of the Washington Territorial Legislature, Chairman of the Public Lands Committee, Chairman of the state's Constitutional Convention, and justice of the State Supreme Court upon admission of Washington to the Union in 1889. He became chief justice in 1892, and in 1912 was re-nominated without opposition on a non-partisan judiciary ticket, a week before his sudden death.

== Death ==
Dunbar died of apoplexy in Olympia, Washington at the age of 67.

Political offices
Preceded by Newly created court	Justice of the Washington Supreme Court; 1889–1912	Succeeded by John F. Main
