= Charles F. Stafford =

American judge (1918–1984)

The Honorable Charles F. Stafford Jr.

Justice of the Washington Supreme Court
- In office January 13, 1970 – July 3, 1984
- Appointed by: Daniel J. Evans
- Preceded by: Matthew W. Hill
- Succeeded by: James A. Andersen

Personal details
- Born: June 24, 1918 Burlington, Washington, U.S.
- Died: July 3, 1984 (aged 66) Olympia, Washington, U.S.
- Spouse: Katherine "Kay" Grimm; Elizabeth Greenwell Banks (m. 1981)
- Children: 2
- Education: Whitman College (BA); Yale Law School (LLB)
- Occupation: Lawyer, judge

Charles Frederick Stafford Jr. (June 24, 1918 – July 3, 1984), was an American lawyer who was a justice of the Washington Supreme Court from 1970 to 1984.

== Biography ==
Charles Stafford, Jr. was born in Burlington, Washington to Charles Frederick Stafford, Sr. and Madge Marie Davis. He attended high school in Anacortes, not Bellingham, graduating in 1936. Stafford enrolled in Whitman College, and in 1940 was awarded a B.A. and elected to Phi Beta Kappa. In 1940, he began his studies at Yale Law School, but left in August 1943 to serve as lieutenant in the U.S. Signal Corps during World War II. In 1946, Stafford returned to Yale and completed his LL.B. degree. Back in his home town, he campaigned for the election of the Skagit County Prosecutor and was appointed the deputy prosecutor. In 1952, at the age of 34, Stafford, became judge of the Skagit County Superior Court. In 1968, Governor Daniel J. Evans appointed Stafford to the Division I of the Court of Appeals. A few months later, Evans elevated Stafford to the Washington State Supreme Court to replace Justice Matthew W. Hill, who retired. Stafford served as chief justice from January 13, 1975, to January 10, 1977.

== Personal life ==
He married Katherine "Kay" Grimm, whom he had met at Yale, and they had two children. She died in 1980, and Charles Stafford remarried Elizabeth Greenwell Banks in 1981. Though in ill health his final year, he continued to serve on the Court until he died on July 3, 1984.

Political offices
Preceded by Matthew W. Hill	Associate Justice of the Washington Supreme Court; 1970–1984	Succeeded by James A. Andersen
