= Hiram E. Hadley =

American judge (1854–1929)

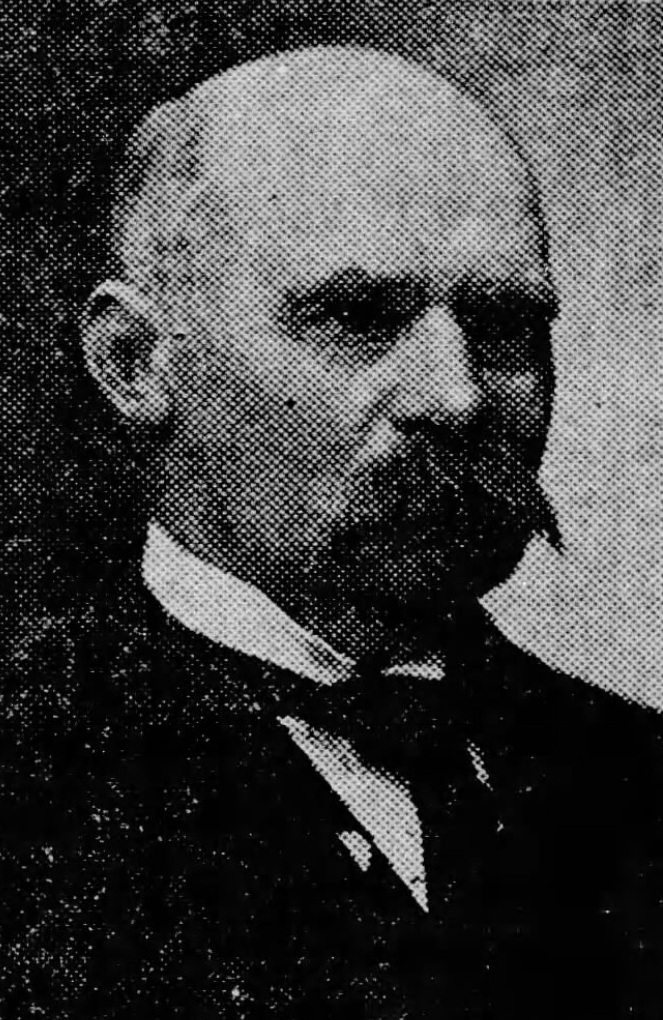
Justice Hiram E. Hadley

Hiram Elwood Hadley (January 16, 1854 – January 13, 1929) was a justice of the Washington Supreme Court from 1901 to 1909.

== Early life, education, and career ==
Born in Parke County, Indiana, Hadley was the oldest of three sons of Jonathan and Martha McCoy Hadley, devout Quakers. One of his brothers Lindley H. Hadley, later served in the United States House of Representatives. Hadley received his early education in Quaker schools. At 17 he taught a district school and then entered Earlham College, in Richmond, Indiana. In 1877 he graduated at Union College of Law, now Northwestern University Law School, and began active practice of law in Bloomington, Illinois, in association with Thomas Slade. Four years later he moved to Rockville, Indiana, becoming well known and successful in his profession. In 1889, he moved to Bellingham, Washington, where he rejoined Thomas Slade, and in 1890 was joined by Hadley's brother Lindley.

Hadley's first public service was that of city attorney of New Whatcom, the name of the consolidated towns of Whatcom and Sehome. He was elected by council while absent from the city and without knowing that he was under consideration. As city attorney he drew ordinances that became fundamental in the city charter. Eventually he and his brother joined with Charles W. Dorr to form the law firm of Dorr, Hadley & Hadley. Hadley remained in practice until 1897.

== Judicial service and later life ==
In 1896, when the free silver movement and the William Jennings Bryan Democratic presidential campaign swept this state, the Whatcom county Republican Party nominated Hadley for superior court judge. Hadley was elected, despite Bryan and the state fusion ticket carrying the county by heavy majorities, and took office in 1897.

Before the end of his first term, the Whatcom county bar secured from all political parties a unanimous endorsement for Hadley's re-election. Soon after beginning his second term in Whatcom county, however, Hadley was appointed by Governor Rogers as a justice of the state supreme court. In order to clear up the congested court calendar, the Republican legislature had created two additional positions of the tribunal, each to serve for two years, until October 1902. The law specified that the appointees should not both be from the same political party. Governor Rogers, a Democrat, named William H. White, of King county, a Democrat, and Hadley, a Republican. At the same time he appointed Jeremiah Neterer to Hadley's former seat on the Whatcom county superior bench. This was seen as a strategic victory for the governor, as it "not only removed a popular Republican from a district in which no opposition could be raked up against him, but also gives the governor a chance to appoint a democrat to the position made vacant by Hadley's appointment".

In 1902, the state Republican convention nominated Hadley for reelection, and in November 1902, he was "elected by the largest majority received by any state official up to that time", to continue at Olympia for a full six-year term on the supreme court. Hadley assumed office for his second term in January 1903, serving on the court for a total of eight years, "two years of which time he was chief justice". Hadley served as chief justice in 1907 and 1908. Before the close of his second term he announced that he would not be a candidate for reelection. He was succeeded on the supreme bench by Stephen J. Chadwick, then superior judge of Whitman county. In 1908, Earlham College conferred upon Hadley the honorary degree of LL.D.

At the opening of 1909, Hadley and Charles W. Dorr, who had relocated to San Francisco for a number of years, re-established the firm of Dorr & Hadley in Seattle. They were joined by their sons, Clyde M. Hadley and Fred W. Dorr. The senior Dorr died in 1914, and the firm became Hadley & Hadley, then Hadley, Hay & Hadley, with E. M. Hay, son of former Governor Hay. For a while Major Edgar S. Hadley, a distant cousin of Hadley, was associated with him in practice in Seattle. In 1927, Hadley was chairman of the committee that arranged the program of tribute to Dr. M. A. Matthews on the twenty-fifth anniversary of his pastorate of the First Presbyterian church, Seattle. Hadley served as vice chairman of the state development committee, and was chairman of the mediation committee named by Mayor Hiram Gill to negotiate a settlement of a serious teamsters' strike that threatened the local economy. Some citizens urged him to become a candidate for Mayor of Seattle, but Hadley declined to consider again holding public office.

== Personal life and death ==
While attending the Friends Academy in Bloomingdale, Hadley met Martha Musgrave, who became his wife on January 19, 1879. They had three sons and two daughters.

Hadley died in Seattle after a long illness. His funeral was held at the First Presbyterian Church in Seattle.

Political offices
Preceded by Newly established seat James Bradley Reavis	Justice of the Washington Supreme Court; 1901–1902; 1903–1909	Succeeded by Seat expired Stephen J. Chadwick
