= Wallace Mount =

American judge (1859–1921)

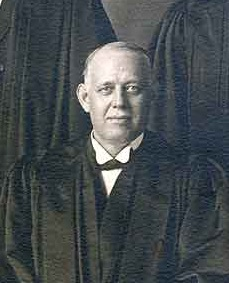
Justice Wallace Mount in the 1910 court photograph of the Washington Supreme Court.

Wallace Mount (January 16, 1859 – September 5, 1921) was a justice of the Washington Supreme Court from 1901 to 1921.

Born near Oregon City, Oregon, Mount was the son of Henry D. and Rebecca Mount, who settled in Oregon in 1851. Mount graduated from the University of Oregon at Eugene in 1883, and moved to Sprague, Washington, in 1886. He practiced law in Sprague until 1888, when he became prosecuting attorney of Douglas, Adams, Lincoln and Okanogan counties. When Washington was admitted to statehood he was elected superior judge of those counties, and was re-elected in 1892. He moved to Spokane in 1896, forming the law partnership of Mount & Merritt. From 1896 to 1900, he served two terms in the Washington State legislature.

In 1900 Mount was elected to the Washington Supreme Court, serving thereafter until his death.

Political offices
Preceded by William H. White	Justice of the Washington Supreme Court; 1901–1921	Succeeded by Chester Ralph Hovey
