= Adam Beeler =

American judge (1879–1947)

The Honorable Adam Beeler
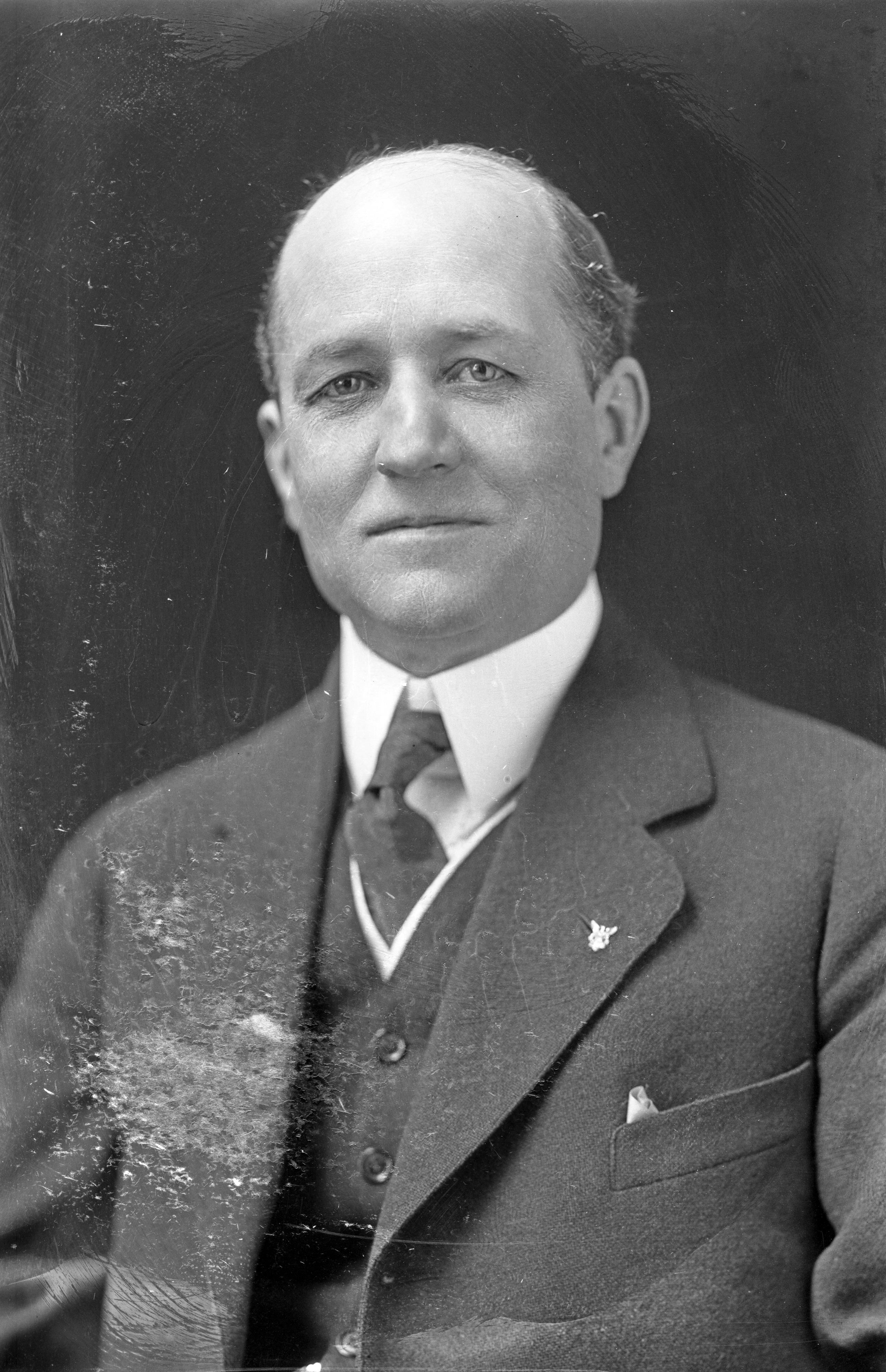
- Adam Beeler in 1927

Justice of the Washington Supreme Court
- In office January 1, 1930 – January 1, 1932
- Preceded by: Walter M. French
- Succeeded by: William J. Steinert

Member of the Washington House of Representatives for the 36th District
- In office January 1, 1922 – January 1, 1928

Personal details
- Born: Adam Madison Beeler; October 11, 1879 Bluffington, Wells County, Indiana, U.S.
- Died: March 25, 1947 (aged 67) Seattle, Washington, U.S.
- Party: Republican
- Spouse: Florence Leona Scott
- Children: 3 Madison, Elizabeth and Virgina
- Education: Indiana University (BA); George Washington University (JD)
- Occupation: Lawyer, politician, judge

Adam Madison Beeler (October 11, 1879 – March 25, 1947) was a justice of the Washington Supreme Court from 1930 until 1932. Beeler served as a King County Superior Court Judge between April 6, 1928, and September 30, 1930, when he was appointed to the Supreme Court by Governor Roland H. Hartley.

Born in Bluffton, Wells County, Indiana, to Peter and Elizabeth Beeler, he attended the Indiana University, where he met his future wife, Florence Leona Scott (November 30, 1887 – January 12, 1960), and was graduated in 1903. He then attended George Washington University Law School. He was married to Florence Scott on April 8, 1909, in Seattle, and they had a son and two daughters: Madison Scott Beeler, Elizabeth Beller, and Virginia Jean Beeler.

Beeler had served in the Washington House of Representatives from 1922 until 1928. In 1932, Beeler resigned his court seat to run for United States Senate, and after losing the primary he was considered in November 1932 as a replacement to Wesley Livsey Jones, following his death.
