= Kenneth Mackintosh =

American judge (1875–1957)

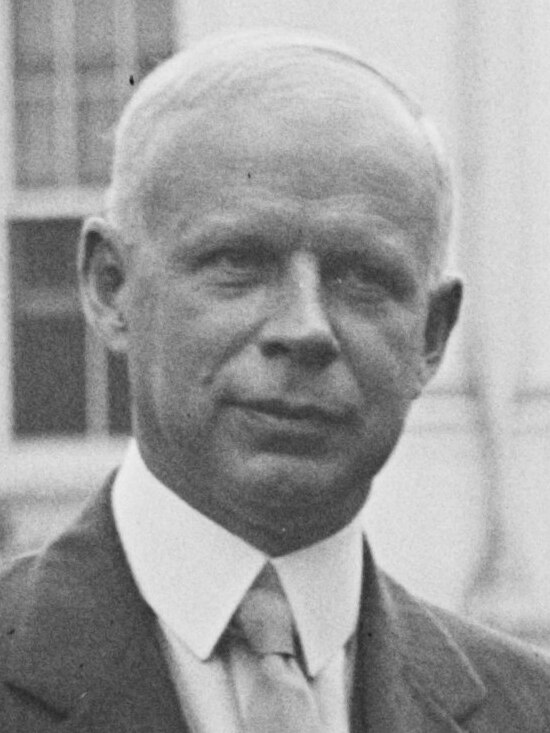
Kenneth Mackintosh at the White House in 1929

Kenneth Mackintosh (1875 – July 14, 1957) was a justice of the Washington Supreme Court from March 30, 1918, to April 16, 1928. He was chief justice from January 10, 1927, until his retirement on April 16, 1928.

== Early life and education ==
Born in Seattle, Washington, Mackintosh attended Stanford University and Columbia Law School, and was admitted to practice law following his graduation.

== Early career ==
In 1905, Mackintosh became prosecuting attorney of King County, Washington, in which capacity he served two full terms. In 1912, he was elected to the King County Superior bench.

Boswell's Blue Book noted that Mackintosh "quickly demonstrated ideal qualifications for the judiciary, and members of the bar were not slow in seeing that in this brilliant young jurist was good timber for the supreme bench".

As a justice of the state supreme court, he wrote some of the court's most important opinions.

== Personal life ==
In 1908 Mackintosh married Francisca Arques, and the couple had one child.

Political offices
Preceded by George E. Morris	Justice of the Washington Supreme Court; 1918–1928	Succeeded by Walter B. Beals
