= Fred H. Dore =

American judge

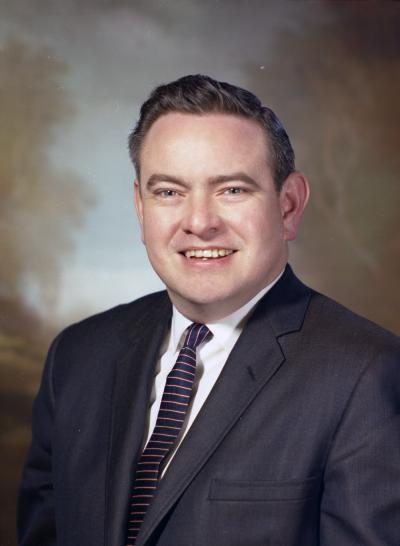
- Dore in 1967

Associate Justice of the Washington Supreme Court
- In office January 12, 1981 – January 1, 1993
- Preceded by: Charles Horowitz
- Succeeded by: Barbara Madsen

Member of the Washington State Senate
- In office January 11, 1971 – January 13, 1975
- Preceded by: Richard G. "Dick" Marquardt
- Succeeded by: Alan Bluechel
- Constituency: 45th
- In office March 11, 1959 – January 11, 1971
- Preceded by: Patrick D. Sutherland
- Succeeded by: George Fleming
- Constituency: 37th

Member of the Washington House of Representatives from the 37th district
- In office January 12, 1953 – March 11, 1959
- Preceded by: George V. Powell
- Succeeded by: Ann T. O'Donnell

Personal details
- Born: Frederick Hudson Dore; July 31, 1925 Seattle, Washington, U.S.
- Died: May 16, 1996 (aged 70) Bellevue, Washington, U.S.
- Party: Democratic
- Education: Georgetown University Law Center (JD)

Frederick Hudson Dore (July 31, 1925 – May 16, 1996) was an American lawyer and politician in the state of Washington. He served in the Washington House of Representatives from 1953 to 1959 for district 37, and in the Senate from 1959 to 1975. He was also a Washington Supreme Court justice from 1981 to 1993.

The Fred H. and Mary S. Dore Foundation was established after his death and provides scholarships, grants, and endowments related to Sudden Infant Death Syndrome (SIDS), enhancing the educational opportunities for students of achievement, and assisting the under-served.
