= Mark A. Fullerton =

American judge (1858–1931)

- Fullerton on the 1910 Washington Supreme Court

Chief Justice of the Washington Supreme Court
- In office 1903–1905

Chief Justice of the Washington Supreme Court
- In office April 16, 1928 – January 1929
- Preceded by: Kenneth Mackintosh

Associate Justice of the Washington Supreme Court
- In office January 1899 – September 15, 1931

Personal details
- Born: November 13, 1858 Oregon Territory, U.S.
- Died: September 15, 1931 (aged 72) Olympia, Washington, U.S.
- Spouse: Ella Ione Rounds (m. 1887)
- Children: 3
- Education: Willamette University
- Profession: Lawyer, surveyor, jurist

Mark A. Fullerton (November 13, 1858 – September 15, 1931) was an American lawyer, surveyor, and jurist who served as an Associate Justice and Chief Justice of the Washington Supreme Court from 1899 until his death in 1931. His 32-year tenure on the bench stood as the longest in Washington State history for over nine decades until surpassed by Justice Charles W. Johnson in September 2023.

== Early life and career ==
Fullerton was born on November 13, 1858, in the Oregon Territory to pioneers Charles Fullerton and Lillis (Stetson) Fullerton. He attended Willamette University and worked as a United States Deputy Surveyor in Oregon, executing federal township survey contracts in central and eastern Oregon, including along the upper John Day River in 1880.

He was admitted to the Washington Bar in 1883 and settled in Colfax, Washington, in Whitman County. In 1888, he was elected Prosecuting Attorney for Whitman County.

In 1891, Fullerton served as head of the federal commission that negotiated the agreement with the Confederated Tribes of the Colville Reservation regarding the northern half of the Colville Reservation. In 1904, while serving as Chief Justice, he testified before Congress urging ratification and protection of the tribal hunting and land rights promised under that agreement—testimony later quoted extensively by the Supreme Court of the United States in Antoine v. Washington (1975).

== Washington Supreme Court ==
Fullerton was elected to the Washington Supreme Court in 1898 and took office in January 1899. He served continuously on the court until his death in 1931, including terms as Chief Justice from 1903 to 1905 and again in 1928 following the resignation of Chief Justice Kenneth Mackintosh.

Fullerton remained the longest-serving justice in the history of the Washington Supreme Court until September 2023, when Justice Charles W. Johnson surpassed his 32-year record, and the second-longest until September 2025, when Justice Barbara Madsen also passed his tenure.

== Personal life and death ==
In 1887, Fullerton married Ella Ione Rounds of Michigan, with whom he had three sons, including Roscoe Fullerton, who graduated from Washington State College (now Washington State University) in Pullman in 1909. Fullerton died on September 15, 1931, in Olympia, Washington.
