= John Robinson (judge) =

American judge (1880–1951)

- Robinson in 1903
- Born: December 17, 1880; Mansfield, Ohio
- Died: October 9, 1951 (aged 70); Olympia, Washington
- Occupation: Attorney
- Known for: Member of the Washington Supreme Court, 1937-1951; Chief Justice, 1941-1943

John Sherman Robinson (December 17, 1880 – October 9, 1951) was an American track and field athlete, lawyer, judge, and chief justice of the Washington Supreme Court.

== Early life and education ==
John was born in Mansfield, Ohio, to Samuel Radford Robinson (October 12, 1830- July 27, 1904), a berry grower who immigrated from Derbyshire, England, and Caroline "Mathia" Mottayaw (October 26, 1840 – June 17, 1907), a homemaker. He was the youngest of five boys, and his older brothers were farm laborers. John attended Mansfield High School, where he ran track and field.

Robinson attended the University of Michigan and received his bachelor's degree in 1903. While at Michigan, Robinson was a member of the track and field team. He ran the hurdles until sustaining an injury and then competed in the shot put. He was the captain of the track team as a senior. Following graduation, he spent four years as a local teacher, a time during which both his mother and father died. With their deaths, Robinson left Ohio in 1907, enrolled in Columbia Law School, and received his law degree in 1910.

== Legal career ==
After receiving his law degree, Robinson moved to Seattle and practiced in the firm of Bronson, Robinson & Jones. From 1924, he practiced with Harroun, Robinson, Maloy & Shidler, whose offices were at 1800 Exchange Building. Partners included George Levant Harroun, a graduate of Northwestern University, who focused on banking law, C. E. H. Maloy, an active litigator, and Roger L. Shidler, a 1924 graduate of the University of Washington Law School.

In 1916-1917, Robinson served on the Code Commission of the Washington State Bar Association. In 1920-1921, he was a member of the Judiciary and Judicial Administration Committee of the State Bar. From 1933 to 1936, he was the Chair of the State Board of Bar Examiners. Also in 1933, Robinson briefly served as a Superior Court judge, and from 1933 to 1936 served as President of the Seattle Bar Association.

From 1937 to 1951, he served as a member of the Washington Supreme Court, and as the chief justice from 1941 to 1943.

== Personal ==
On June 22, 1916, Robinson married Edith J. Lind (September 30, 1891 – October 2, 1978) in Tacoma, Washington. They had three sons: John Sherman Robinson, Jr., also an attorney, Samuel W. Robinson, and Irving L. "Robbie" Robinson, a French teacher at the Groton School and Western Reserve Academy.

In Olympia, the family lived in what is known as the McCleary/Robinson House at 101 Northwest Sherman Street. It had been built in 1916 by Charles McCleary and his wife, Vivian Gose McCleary, who was the daughter of Mack F. Gose, a Washington Supreme Court Justice from 1909 to 1915.

In October 1951, Judge Robinson died four months after retiring from the Court, and is buried in Lake Forest Park Cemetery, Seattle, Washington.
