= Matthew W. Hill =

American judge (1894–1989)

The Honorable Matthew W. Hill

Justice of the Washington Supreme Court
- In office January 13, 1947 – December 31, 1969
- Preceded by: Edward M. Connelly
- Succeeded by: Charles F. Stafford Jr.

Personal details
- Born: June 26, 1894 Bozeman, Montana, U.S.
- Died: February 28, 1989 (aged 94) Olympia, Washington, U.S.
- Spouse: Irma Verne Young
- Children: 3
- Education: University of Washington (LLB)
- Occupation: Lawyer, judge

Matthew William Hill (June 26, 1894 – February 28, 1989) was an American lawyer who served as a justice of the Washington Supreme Court from 1947 to 1969, and chief justice from 1957 to 1959.

== Early life and education ==
Matthew Hill was born on June 26, 1894 in Bozeman, Montana. He was the only child of Saxton Hill and Mary Elma Noe. In 1907, when Matthew was 13 years old, the family moved to Lester, Washington. He attended a two-room school, later being graduated from Stadium High School, Tacoma, in 1912.

He enrolled in the University of Washington where he was a member of the debating team, and vice-president of the University of Washington Associated Students. In 1917, he graduated cum laude and Order of the Coif with a Bachelors of Law degree.

Hill taugh high school in Bellingham for one year. During World War I, he served with the United States Coast Guard.

== Legal career ==
Admitted to the Bar in 1918, Hill practiced law in Seattle. From 1923 to 1924, he served as an Assistant U.S. District Attorney. He was appointed judge of the King County Superior Court in 1945. In 1946, he was elected as a justice of the Supreme Court of Washington State, defeating incumbent Edward M. Connelly, taking office on January 13, 1947, and served as chief justice from January 14, 1957, to January 12, 1958.

After retiring from the bench, Hill served as the chair of the Washington Department of Ecology's State Pollution Control Hearings Board and the Shoreland Hearings Board. He was a member of the American Bar Association, American Judicature Society, the Washington Bar Association, and the World Peace Through Law Association.

== Honors ==
He received an honorary Juris Doctor from Seattle Pacific College in 1947. The Matthew W. Hill Scholarship at the University of Washington Law School, established in his memory, supports second and third year students.

== Personal life ==
In May 1924, Hill married Irma Verne Young. They had three children: Irma L. Hill, Mary B. Hill, and Matthew Hale Hill.

Hill served on the national council of the Boy Scouts of America, the vice-president of the American Baptist Convention. and a board member of Washington Historical Society and Linfield College. He was a member of the Fraternal Order of Eagles, the Kiwanis, and the Freemasons, serving as the grandmaster of the Free and Accepted Masons of Washington and was a 33rd degree Scottish Rite. He was a member of the First Baptist Church of Olympia.

Hill died on February 28, 1989 in Olympia at the age of 94.

== Selected publications ==
- Hill, Matthew W. (February 1, 1971). "Sir Matthew Hale and Modern Judicial Ethics". Judicial Ethics and the National News Council.
- Court opinions written by Matthew W. Hill. CourtListener.com.

Political offices
Preceded by Edward M. Connelly	Justice; 1947–1969	Succeeded by Charles F. Stafford Jr.
