= Stephen J. Chadwick =

American judge (1863–1931)

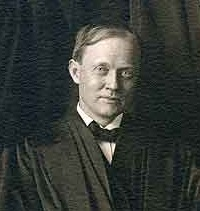

Justice of the Washington Supreme Court
- In office 1908–1919
- Preceded by: Milo A. Root
- Succeeded by: Jesse B. Bridges

Personal details
- Born: April 28, 1863 Roseburg, Oregon, U.S.
- Died: November 19, 1931 (aged 68)
- Spouse: Emma Plummer
- Children: 4
- Education: Willamette University; University of Oregon

Stephen James Chadwick (April 28, 1863 – November 19, 1931) was a justice of the Washington Supreme Court from 1908 to 1919, serving as chief justice in 1919.

== Education and career ==
Born in Roseburg, Oregon, Chadwick was the son of Oregon politician and lawyer Stephen F. Chadwick. Chadwick attended Willamette University and the University of Oregon. In 1885 he was admitted to the bar, and entered the practice of law in Eastern Washington.

Chadwick was the Superior Court Judge for Whitman County, Washington from 1900 to 1908, when he was elected to the state supreme court. He was reelected in 1914, defeating a challenge from Edgar G. Mills. served until 1919, when he resigned to return to private practice in Seattle, focusing on corporation and probate law, and procedural matters in the law firm of Chadwick, McMicken, Ramsey & Rupp.

== Personal life and death ==
In 1887, Chadwick married Emma Plummer, with whom he had four children. In 1915, Emma led a design committee formed by the Daughters of the American Revolution to design a new flag of Washington. Chadwick's son Stephen Fowler Chadwick ran for the United States House of Representatives in 1926 and the United States Senate in 1932 and 1940.

Chadwick died in Seattle at the age of 68.

Political offices
Preceded by Milo A. Root	Justice of the Washington Supreme Court; 1908–1919	Succeeded by Jesse B. Bridges
