= Herman D. Crow =

American judge

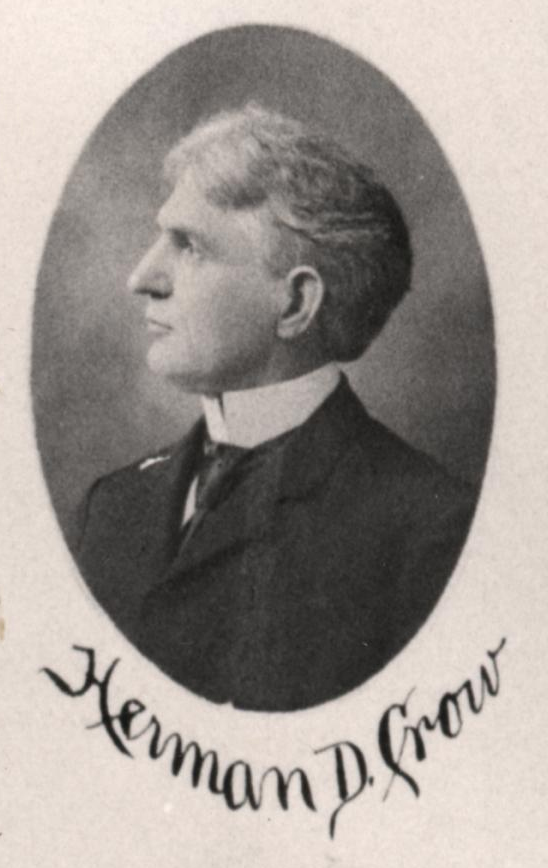
- Crow in 1901

Member of the Washington State Senate for the 4th district
- In office 1899–1905

Justice of the Washington Supreme Court
- In office 1913–1915

Personal details
- Born: April 15, 1851 Delaware, Ohio, United States
- Died: October 22, 1915 (aged 64) Olympia, Washington, United States
- Party: Republican
- Occupation: Attorney, politician, judge

Herman D. Crow (April 15, 1851 – October 22, 1915) was an American politician in the state of Washington. Born in Delaware, Ohio, he served in the Washington State Senate from 1899 to 1905. In 1905, he was appointed by Governor Albert E. Mead to a newly created seat on the Washington state Supreme Court, becoming chief justice in 1913. He died in office of cancer in 1915.

Political offices
Preceded by Newly created seat	Justice of the Washington Supreme Court; 1905–1915	Succeeded by Frederick Bausman
