= Walter B. Beals =

American judge (1876–1960)

The Honorable Walter B. Beals
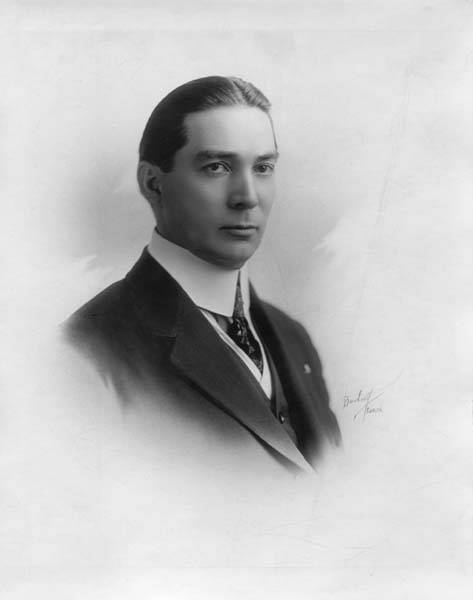
- Walter Beals in 1916

Justice of the Washington Supreme Court
- In office 1928 – 1951

Personal details
- Born: July 21, 1876 St. Paul, Minnesota
- Died: September 18, 1960 (aged 84) Olympia, Washington
- Spouse: Othilia Gertrude Carroll
- Education: University of Washington School of Law, LLB
- Occupation: Judge

Walter Burges Beals (July 21, 1876 – September 18, 1960) was an American judge who served on the Washington Supreme Court from 1928 to 1946 and again from 1947 to 1951. He served as the chief justice of the Washington Supreme Court from 1933 to 1935 and from 1945 to 1946.

== Early life and education ==
Watler B. Beals was born July 21, 1876, in St. Paul, Minnesota. He was the son of James Burrill and Katherine (McMillan) Beals and a descendant of Roger Williams, founder of Rhode Island Colony. His family also included a chief justice of Rhode Island's supreme court, a chief justice of Minnesota's high court, and a senator from that state.

Beals attended public schools in St. Paul, graduating from high school in 1895. He began law studies under an attorney's supervision, but ill health prompted his move to Bellingham, Washington. Within a year he became strong enough to work in a saw mill as a shingle weaver. In 1899, he entered the first class at the University of Washington School of Law (a classmate of Walter M. French and Vivian Carkeek), graduating with a bachelor of laws degree (LL.B.) in 1901.

== Legal and military career ==
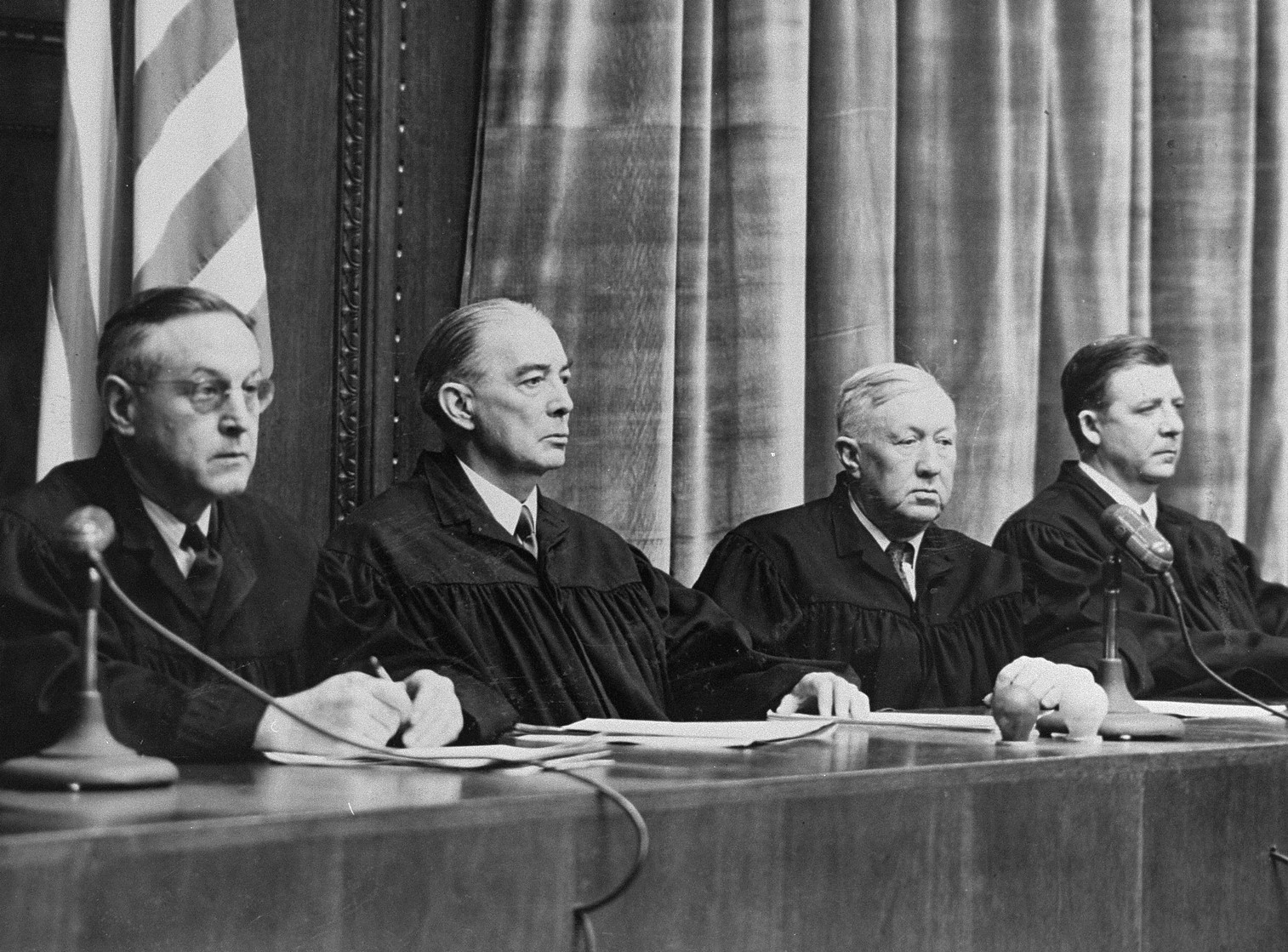
The Nuremberg Military Tribunal, 1946. From left to right: Harold L. Sebring, Walter B. Beals, Johnson T. Crawford, and Victor C. Swearingen.

Beals' first law practice was in partnership with Fred Rice Power. Upon the latter's death, Beals continued to practice in Seattle. He became active in Republican affairs but did not seek public office.

A member of the Washington National Guard from 1909, Beals rose from an infantry private to the rank of major. He entered the U.S. Army in August 1917, serving in the judge advocate's division. Beals spent sixteen months in France and saw action in the Meuse-Argonne Offensive with American expeditionary forces. Promoted to lieutenant colonel and decorated with the Legion of Honour by France, he became one of the founders of the American Legion. Fluent in French, he remained in Europe for several months after the armistice as a liaison officer with the French government.

Returning to Washington, Beals announced his intention to run for the state Supreme Court. In the September primary he failed to unseat any of the three incumbents, falling short by more than 30,000 votes.

During his career, Beals served as Seattle Corporate Counsel from 1923 to 1926, a King County Superior Court judge from 1926 to 1928, and as a Washington State Supreme Court judge and chief justice. He retired in 1951. He served in the U.S. Army during WW II.

From 1946 to 1947, Beals was the Presiding Judge at the International Military Tribunal I in Nuremberg, Germany.

== Family and personal life ==
In 1904, Beals married Othilia Gertrude Carroll, a law school classmate. She was the first woman graduate in the school's first graduating class. She entered practice with her father and brother in Seattle, but resigned from practice when she married. However, during World War I she replaced her brother as Seattle justice of the peace when he went into the armed services. She resigned when her brother returned from the war. Active in civic affairs, she helped found the Seattle Milk Fund, served on the board of the Seattle Girl Scout Council, was state president and national vice president of the American Legion Auxiliary, and was active in the Red Cross. The couple had no children.

Beals was an accomplished private collector of manuscripts and books.

Beals died on September 18, 1960, in Olympia, Washington.

== Archives ==
- Walter B. Beals papers. circa 1400-1951. 66.00 cubic feet. At University of Washington Libraries, Special Collections.
