= List of Gonzaga University School of Law alumni =

Famous Gonzaga University School of Law Graduates
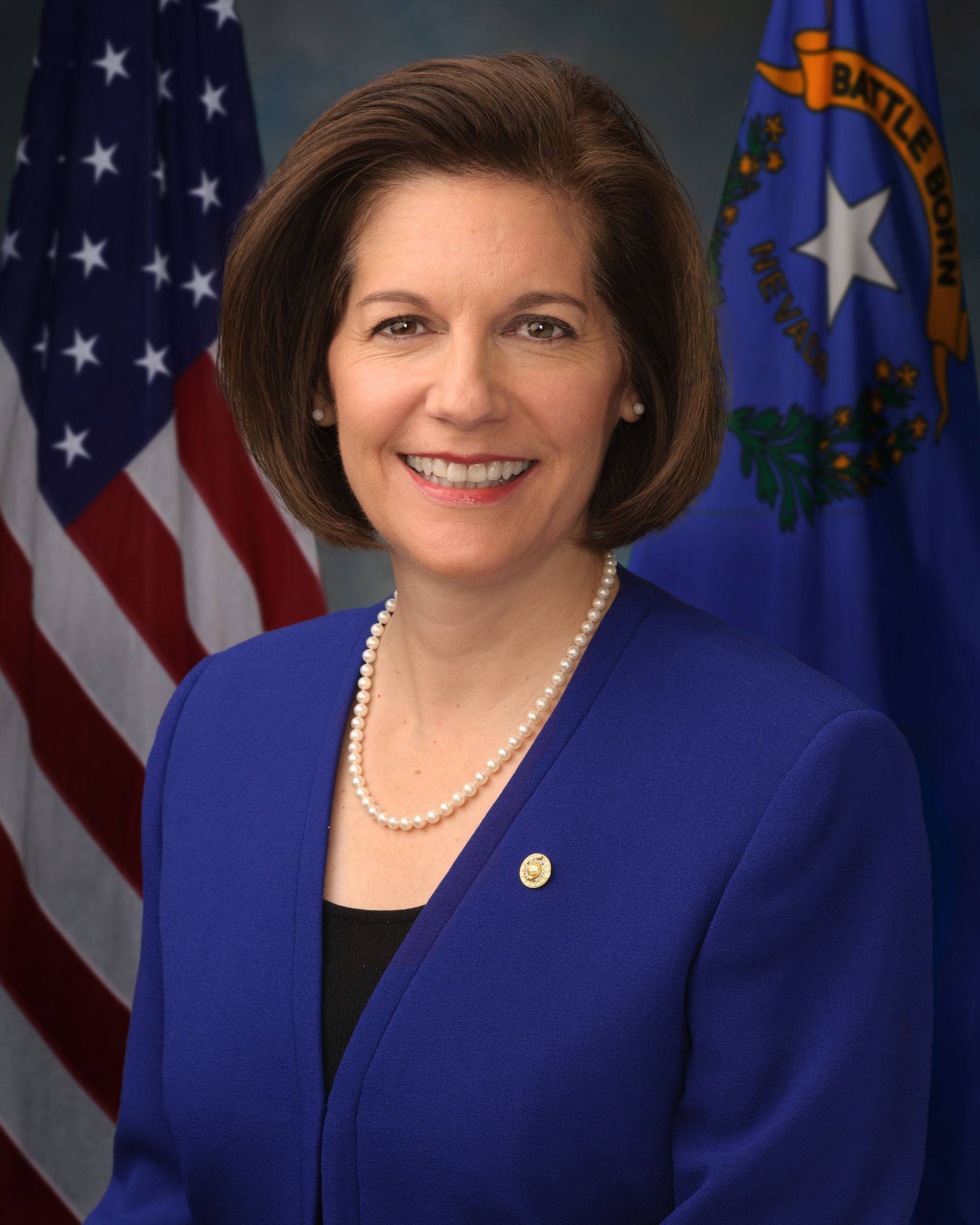
Catherine Cortez Masto '90, U.S. senator (Nevada); 32nd attorney general of Nevada

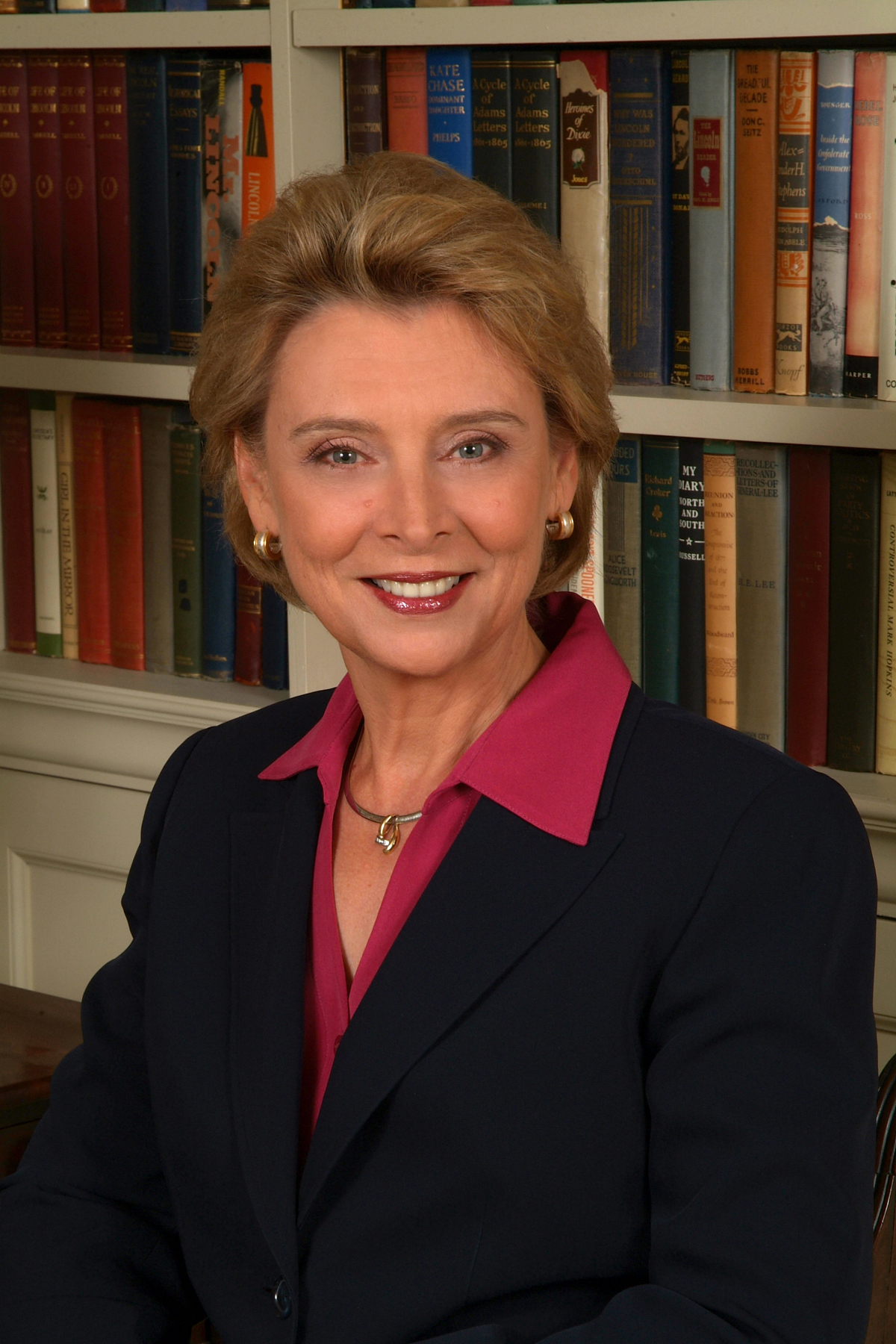
Christine Gregoire '77, 22nd governor of Washington; 16th attorney general of Washington

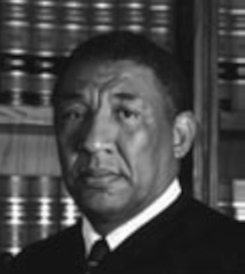
Frank Burgess '66, U.S. district judge and NBA draft pick

This is a list of notable alumni of the Gonzaga University School of Law.

== Federal judges ==
=== U.S. district judges ===
- Franklin D. Burgess, class of 1966, Western District of Washington (1994–2005); 1961 NBA draft pick
- William James Lindberg, class of 1927, Eastern District of Washington (1951–1961), Western District of Washington (1951–1981)
- Robert James McNichols, class of 1952, Eastern District of Washington (1979–1993)
- Aaron C. Peterson, class of 2010, District of Alaska (2026–present)
- Justin Lowe Quackenbush, class of 1957, Eastern District of Washington (1980–1995), lecture series namesake
- Thomas O. Rice, class of 1986, Eastern District of Washington (2012–present)

=== Other countries ===
- Beauleen Carl-Worswick, class of 1990, Micronesian Supreme Court (2010-present)

== State judges ==
=== Supreme Court justices ===
- Edward M. Connelly, class of 1915, Washington Supreme Court (1946–1947)
- Christopher Dietzen, class of 1973, Minnesota Supreme Court (2008–2016)
- Mary Fairhurst, class of 1984, Washington Supreme Court (2002–2020); Washington State Bar Association president (1997–1998)
- Meagan Flynn, class of 1992, Oregon Supreme Court (2017–present)
- Richard P. Guy, class of 1959, Washington Supreme Court (1989–2001)
- Barbara Madsen, class of 1977, Washington Supreme Court (1992–present)
- Mike McGrath, class of 1975, Montana Supreme Court (2009–present)
- Debra L. Stephens, class of 1993, Washington Supreme Court (2008–present)

From 2008 to 2020, with Madsen, Fairhurst, and Stephens concurrently serving on the Washington Supreme Court, Gonzaga University School of Law became the law school whose alumni constituted a majority of that court's justices. Each of those justices also served as chief justice in succession (Madsen, then Fairhurst, then Stephens).

=== Court of appeals judges ===
- Anni Hill Fostem class of 2004, Arizona Court of Appeals, Division I (2022-present)
- Cecily Hazelrigg, class of 2005, Washington Court of Appeals, Division I (2019–present)

== Municipal Judges ==
- Thomas P. Amodeo, class of 1976, Buffalo City Court (1994–present)

== Politicians ==
=== Executive branch ===
==== Presidents and world leaders ====
- Christopher Loeak, class of 1982, 6th president of the Marshall Islands (2012–2016)

==== Governors and lt. governors ====
- Christine Gregoire, class of 1977, 22nd governor of Washington (2005–2013)

==== Attorneys general ====
- Catherine Cortez Masto, class of 1990, 32nd Nevada attorney general (2007–2014)
- Mike McGrath, class of 1975, 22nd attorney general of Montana (2000–2008)

==== United States attorneys ====
- Edward M. Connelly, class of 1915, Eastern District of Washington (1942–1946)
- William D. Hyslop, class of 1980, Eastern District of Washington (1991–1993, reappointed 2019–present); Washington State Bar Association president (2015–2016)
- Michael C. Ormsby, class of 1981, Eastern District of Washington (2010–2017)

==== Other executive branch officials ====
- Richard A. Davey, class of 1999, Massachusetts secretary of transportation (2011–2014)
- Jim Ferrell, class of 1993, mayor of Federal Way, Washington (2014–present)
- Dennis P. Hession, class of 1979, 42nd mayor of Spokane, Washington (2005–2007)
- Mike Pellicciotti, class of 2004, Washington state treasurer (2021–present)
- Mary Verner, class of 1999, 43rd mayor of Spokane, Washington (2007–2011)

=== Legislative branch ===
==== United States Senate ====
- Catherine Cortez Masto, class of 1990, U.S. Senator from Nevada (2017–present)

==== United States House of Representatives ====
- Lloyd Meeds, class of 1958, U.S. Representative from Washington (second district) (1965–1979)
- George Nethercutt, class of 1971, U.S. Representative from Washington (fifth district) (1995–2005)

==== State senates ====
- Jeff Holy, class of 1989, senator, Washington State Senate (District 6) (2019–present); state representative, Washington House of Representatives (District 6) (2013–2019)
- Mike Padden, class of 1974, senator, Washington State Senate (District 4) (2011–2025)

==== State houses of representatives ====
- Gary Hebl, class of 1976, state representative, Wisconsin State Assembly (District 46) (2004–present)
- Mike Pellicciotti, class of 2004, state representative, Washington House of Representatives (District 30) (2016–present)
- Jay Rodne, class of 1997, state representative, Washington House of Representatives (District 5) (2004–2019)
- Matt Shea, class of 1996, state representative, Washington House of Representatives (District 4) (2009–present)
- V. Lowry Snow, class of 1979, speaker pro tempore/state representative, Utah House of Representatives (District 74) (2012–2022); Utah State Bar president (2007)

== Educators ==
- Michael Farris, class of 1976, founder and chancellor emeritus of Patrick Henry College, president/CEO of Alliance Defending Freedom (2017–present)

== Business Leaders ==
- Devon Pritchard, class of 2001, 5th President of Nintendo of America

== Other ==
- Patrick J. Conroy, attended 1972–1973 but did not graduate, 60th chaplain of the United States House of Representatives (2011–present)
- Bing Crosby, attended 1922–1924 but did not graduate, Academy Award Winner, Grammy Hall of Fame inductee
- Chad Little, class of 1988, NASCAR Winston West Series Champion (1987) and Director for Camping World Truck Series
- Paul N. Luvera, class of 1959, American Trial Lawyers Hall of Fame inductee
- Jim Wickwire, class of 1967, world-class mountain climber; first American to summit K2
