= Vanessa Waldref =

American lawyer (born 1980)

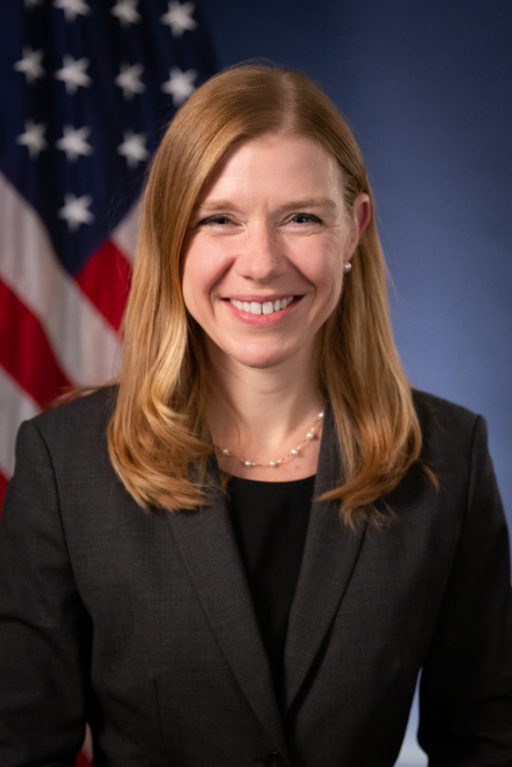

United States Attorney for the Eastern District of Washington
- In office October 7, 2021 – February 12, 2025
- President: Joe Biden
- Preceded by: William D. Hyslop
- Succeeded by: Richard Barker (acting)

Personal details
- Born: 1980 (age 45–46) Spokane, Washington, U.S.
- Spouse: Jeff Brogan
- Children: 1
- Education: Georgetown University (BA, JD)

Vanessa Ruth Waldref (born 1980) is an American lawyer who served as the United States attorney for the Eastern District of Washington from 2021 to 2025.

== Early life and education ==
Waldref is a native of Spokane, Washington. Her sister, Amber Waldref, served as a member of the Spokane City Council and is currently a Spokane County commissioner. She earned a Bachelor of Arts degree from Georgetown University in 2002 and a Juris Doctor from the Georgetown University Law Center in 2008.

== Career ==
Waldref served as a law clerk for Judge John D. Bates of the United States District Court for the District of Columbia. She was an associate at Morrison & Foerster from 2008 to 2010, Lukins & Annis from 2010 to 2011, and Lee & Hayes from 2012 to 2013. She served as an Assistant United States Attorney for the Eastern District of Washington from 2013 to 2020. She has most recently served as a trial attorney in the United States Department of Justice Environment and Natural Resources Division.

=== United States attorney ===
Waldref was nominated to serve as United States attorney for the Eastern District of Washington on July 26, 2021. On September 23, 2021, her nomination was reported out of committee. On September 30, 2021, her nomination was confirmed in the United States Senate by voice vote. She was sworn into office on October 7, 2021, by chief judge Stanley Bastian.

== Personal life ==
Waldref and her husband, Jeff Brogan, have a child and live in Spokane, Washington.
