= Amodeo =

Amodeo is a surname. Notable people with the name include:

- Alberto Amodeo (born 2000), Italian Paralympic swimmer
- Federico Amodeo (1859–1946), Italian mathematician
- John Amodeo, American television producer
- John F. Amodeo, (born 1950), American politician from New Jersey
- Mike Amodeo (born 1952), Canadian ice hockey player
- Orie Amodeo (1921–1998), American musician, member of the Lawrence Welk orchestra
- Santiago Amodeo (born 1969), Andalusian film director, screenwriter, musician and composer
- Thomas P. Amodeo (born 1951), American lawyer and judge

== See also ==
- Amadeo (disambiguation)
- Amedeo, given name
