= List of United States federal courthouses in Washington (state) =

Following is a list of current and former courthouses of the United States federal court system located in Washington. Each entry indicates the name of the building along with an image, if available, its location and the jurisdiction it covers, the dates during which it was used for each such jurisdiction, and, if applicable the person for whom it was named, and the date of renaming. Dates of use will not necessarily correspond with the dates of construction or demolition of a building, as pre-existing structures may be adapted or court use, and former court buildings may later be put to other uses. Also, the official name of the building may be changed at some point after its use as a federal court building has been initiated.

== Courthouses ==
Courthouse	City	Image	Street address	Jurisdiction	Dates of use	Named for
U.S. Post Office & Court House^{†}	Bellingham		104 West Magnolia Street	W.D. Wash.	1913–? Now owned by the city, and still used as a post office	n/a
U.S. Courthouse and Federal Building	Richland		825 Jadwin Avenue	E.D. Wash.	1965–present	n/a
U.S. Courthouse, Custom House and Post Office	Seattle		3rd Avenue and Union Street	W.D. Wash.	1914–? Demolished in 1958.	n/a
Federal Office Building†	Seattle		909 1st Avenue	W.D. Wash.	1932–2004	n/a
William Kenzo Nakamura U.S. Courthouse†	Seattle		1010 Fifth Avenue	W.D. Wash. 9th Cir.	1940–present	Medal of Honor recipient William K. Nakamura (2000)
U.S. Courthouse	Seattle		700 Stewart Street	W.D. Wash.	2004–present	n/a
U.S. Post Office, Courthouse, & Custom House^{†}	Spokane		904 West Riverside Avenue	E.D. Wash.	1909–present	n/a
Thomas S. Foley U.S. Courthouse	Spokane		920 West Riverside Avenue	E.D. Wash.	1967–present	House Speaker Tom Foley
U.S. Post Office, Courthouse, and Custom House†	Tacoma		1102 A Street	W.D. Wash.	1910–1992; Still in use as a post office.	n/a
Tacoma Union Station^{†}	Tacoma		1713 Pacific Avenue	W.D. Wash.	1992–present Constructed in 1911.	NP Railroad Station
Federal Building	Vancouver		500 West 12th Street	W.D. Wash.	1966–present	n/a
U.S. Post Office and Courthouse	Walla Walla		128 North 2nd Avenue	E.D. Wash.	1914–? Still in use as a post office.	n/a
William O. Douglas Federal Building^{†}	Yakima		25 South 3rd Street	E.D. Wash.	1912–present	Supreme Court Justice William O. Douglas

== Key ==
^{†}	Listed on the National Register of Historic Places (NRHP)
^{††}	NRHP-listed and also designated as a National Historic Landmark
