= Judge Van Sickle =

Judge Van Sickle may refer to:

- Bruce Van Sickle (1917–2007), judge of the United States District Court for the District of North Dakota
- Frederick L. Van Sickle (1943–2021), judge of the United States District Court for the Eastern District of Washington
