= Judge Lindberg =

Judge Lindberg may refer to:

- George W. Lindberg (1932–2019), judge of the United States District Court for the Northern District of Illinois
- William James Lindberg (1904–1981), judge of the United States District Court for the Eastern and Western Districts of Washington
