= GU Law =

GU Law can refer to:

- Georgetown University Law Center
- Gonzaga University School of Law
