= Lane Powell PC =

American law firm based in Seattle, Washington

- Headquarters: Seattle, Washington, United States
- No. of offices: 4
- No. of attorneys: 200
- Major practice areas: Corporate law, Litigation, Labor & Employment
- Key people: Barbara Duffy, President
- Date founded: 1875; 150 years ago
- Company type: Professional corporation
- Dissolved: January 1, 2025; 6 months ago
- Website: www.lanepowell.com

Lane Powell PC was an American law firm based in Seattle, Washington, with offices in Anchorage and Portland. The firm was established in 1875, making it one of the Pacific Northwest's oldest and longest-running law firms.

Employing approximately 200 lawyers, its clients have included individuals, startups, and large businesses, offering corporate, regulatory, and litigation services. The firm represented clients such as Nordstrom, Starbucks, Bank of America, Safeway, Cigna, Aetna, Chevron, and BNSF Railway Co.

As of January 1, 2025, the firm merged with and took the name of Ballard Spahr.

== History ==
=== Portland ===
In 1875, William D. Fenton began practicing law as a partner at Portland law firm McCain and Fenton. Upon his death, Fenton's home library was donated to the University of Oregon, which built Fenton Hall in his name. His home, the William D. Fenton House, was added to the National Register of Historic Places in 1979.

After Fenton's passing in 1918, McCain and Fenton was renamed to Hampson and Nelson, and moved to the Pacific Building in Portland. From 1918 to 1979, the firm went through several leadership and name changes with the addition of partners like Herbert Anderson, Oglesby Young and William Lubersky. In 1979, John Bledsoe joined as a naming partner, changing the firm’s name to Spears, Lubersky, Campbell and Bledsoe. Anderson and Young were also added to the naming partner group, renaming the firm in 1988 to Spears, Lubersky, Bledsoe, Anderson, Young and Hilliard.

=== Seattle ===
Lane Powell's Seattle office began in 1889 when John H. Powell arrived in Seattle and practiced law in the firm Stratton, Lewis & Gilman. In 1900, William A. Peters and Powell entered into a partnership under the name Peters & Powell, located in the Dexter Horton Building. The addition of partners such as W. Bryon Lane and Gordon Moss in 1959 led the firm to be named Evans, McLaren, Lane, Powell & Moss. In 1966, Pendleton Miller joined the firm as naming partner, changing the firm to Lane, Powell, Moss & Miller. During this time, the firm expanded to Anchorage by merging with Ruskin, Barker & Hicks.

=== Mergers ===
In 1990, the Portland firm Spears, Lubersky, Campbell, Bledsoe, Anderson, Young & Hilliard merged with Seattle-based firm Lane, Powell, Moss & Miller, leading to the name Lane Powell Spears Lubersky LLP. In 2002, when the firm was called "Lane Powell Spears Lubersky LLP", it was part of a court settlement regarding the collapse of the Portland-based investment firm Capital Consultants LLC, for which the law firm was the primary outside consultant. The settlements, amounting to $25 million, came from the law firm's insurance coverage. The company renamed to Lane Powell PC in 2005. In September 2024, Lane Powell agreed to merge with Ballard Spahr as of 2025, with the combined firm to operate under the Ballard Spahr name.

== Philanthropy ==
In partnership with the University of Washington School of Law, Lane Powell annually supports the school through the Ronald E. Beard Scholarship, Gregoire Fellows program and Lane Powell & D. Wayne Gittinger Endowed Professorship. Other beneficiaries include the American Heart Association, Basic Rights Oregon, Campaign for Equal Justice, Food Lifeline, Fred Hutch Cancer Research Center, Start Making A Reader Today (SMART), and the United Way.

== Leadership ==
In 2019, Barbara Duffy was named president of the company.

== Notable alumni ==
- William T. Beeks
- Thomas Samuel Zilly, federal district court judge
- James Robart

== Awards and honors ==
- 2019 – Received 100 percent score in the Human Rights Campaign Foundation's Annual Corporate Equality Index
- 2018 – Named One of the Nation's Best Places to Work for LGBTQ Equality by The Human Rights Campaign Foundation
- 2018 – Named in Puget Sound Business Journal "Top 75 Corporate Philanthropists" list
