= Mary Dimke =

American judge (born 1977)

Mary K. Dimke
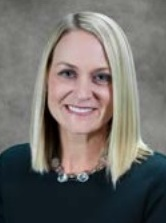
- Dimke in 2023

Judge of the United States District Court for the Eastern District of Washington
- Incumbent
- Assumed office December 21, 2021
- Appointed by: Joe Biden
- Preceded by: Rosanna M. Peterson

Magistrate Judge of the United States District Court for the Eastern District of Washington
- In office January 14, 2016 – December 21, 2021
- Preceded by: James Hutton
- Succeeded by: Alexander Ekstrom

Personal details
- Born: 1977 (age 48–49) Clarkston, Washington, U.S.
- Education: Pepperdine University (BA); Vanderbilt University (JD)

Mary Katherine Dimke (born 1977) is an American lawyer who has served as a United States district judge for the United States District Court for the Eastern District of Washington since 2021. She previously served as a United States magistrate judge of the same court from 2016 to 2021.

== Early life and education ==
Dimke was born in 1977 in Clarkston, Washington. She graduated from Clarkston High School. Dimke received her Bachelor of Arts, magna cum laude, from Pepperdine University in 1999 and her Juris Doctor from Vanderbilt University Law School in 2002 as a member of the Order of the Coif.

== Career ==
Dimke began her legal career as a law clerk for Judge Alan Bond Johnson of the United States District Court for the District of Wyoming from 2002 to 2003. She then clerked for Judge Richard C. Tallman of the United States Court of Appeals for the Ninth Circuit from 2003 to 2004. She joined the United States Department of Justice through its Honors Program in 2004 where she served as an attorney in the Fraud Section of the Criminal Division until 2007. She served as an Assistant United States Attorney for the Western District of Washington from 2008 to 2012 and for the Eastern District of Washington from 2012 to 2016.

=== Federal judicial service ===
In November 2015, she was named as a United States magistrate judge for the United States District Court for the Eastern District of Washington to succeed Judge James Hutton. She was sworn in on January 14, 2016, by Judge Richard C. Tallman.

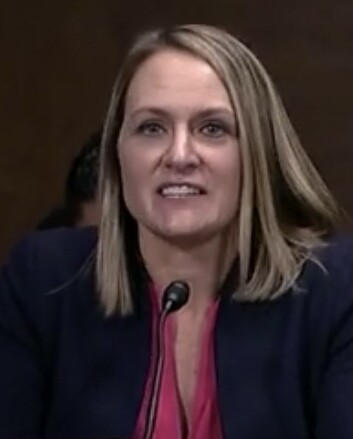
U.S. Senate Judiciary Committee hearing

On August 5, 2021, President Joe Biden nominated Dimke to serve as a United States district judge of the United States District Court for the Eastern District of Washington. Dimke was nominated to the seat being vacated by Judge Rosanna M. Peterson, who subsequently assumed senior status on October 1, 2021. On October 20, 2021, a hearing on her nomination was held before the Senate Judiciary Committee. On December 2, 2021, her nomination was reported out of committee by a 16–6 vote. On December 18, 2021, the United States Senate invoked cloture on her nomination by a 47–23 vote. That same day, her nomination was confirmed by a 47–23 vote. Dimke received her commission on December 21, 2021. She was sworn into office by Chief Judge Stanley Bastian later that day.

== Personal life ==
Dimke's father, John Dimke, was a cattle rancher and her mother, Jan Dimke, was the secretary treasurer of Bennett Lumber Products.

Legal offices
Preceded by Rosanna M. Peterson	Judge of the United States District Court for the Eastern District of Washington; 2021–present	Incumbent
