= William D. Hyslop =

American attorney (1951–2022)

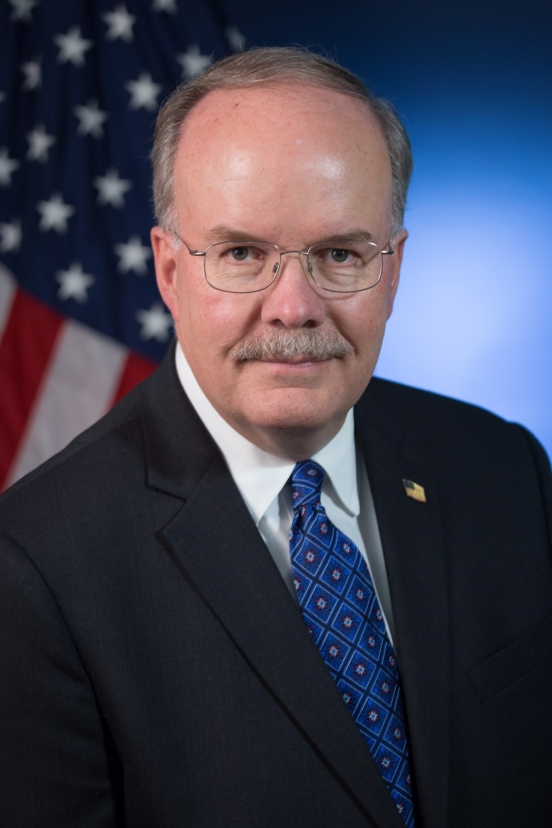

United States Attorney for the Eastern District of Washington
- In office July 19, 2019 – February 28, 2021
- President: Donald Trump; Joe Biden
- Preceded by: Joseph H. Harrington (acting)
- Succeeded by: Vanessa Waldref
- In office 1991–1993
- President: George H. W. Bush
- Preceded by: John E. Lamp
- Succeeded by: James Patrick Connelly

Personal details
- Born: William Douglas Hyslop; March 22, 1951 Spokane, Washington, U.S.
- Died: September 11, 2022 (aged 71) Spokane, Washington, U.S.
- Education: Washington State University (BA); University of Washington (MPA); Gonzaga University (JD)

William Douglas Hyslop (March 22, 1951 – September 11, 2022) was an American attorney who served as the United States attorney for the Eastern District of Washington from 2019 to 2021. He previously served in the position from 1991 to 1993.

== Education ==
Hyslop received his Bachelor of Arts from Washington State University, his Master of Public Administration from the University of Washington, and his Juris Doctor from the Gonzaga University School of Law.

== Legal career ==
Hyslop served as Principal in the Spokane, Washington, office of Lukins & Annis PS, where his practice focused on complex commercial and business litigation in the state and federal courts.

== U.S. attorney for the Eastern District of Washington ==
=== 1991–1993 term ===
Hyslop previously served as the U.S. attorney for the Eastern District of Washington from 1991 to 1993.

=== Nomination as U.S. attorney in 2019 ===
On May 3, 2019, President Donald Trump announced his intent to nominate Hyslop to be the United States attorney for the Eastern District of Washington. On May 13, 2019, his nomination was sent to the United States Senate. On June 13, 2019, his nomination was reported out of committee by voice vote. On June 27, 2019, his nomination was confirmed by voice vote. He was sworn in on July 19, 2019.

On February 8, 2021, he along with 55 other Trump-era attorneys were asked to resign. On February 11, he announced his resignation, effective February 28, 2021.

== Memberships ==
Hyslop previously served as president of the Washington State Bar Association and Federal Bar Association for the Eastern District of Washington.

== Personal life and death ==
Hyslop died on September 11, 2022, aged 71.
