= Judge McNichols =

Judge McNichols may refer to:

- Raymond Clyne McNichols (1914–1985), judge of the United States District Court for the District of Idaho
- Robert James McNichols (1922–1992), judge of the United States District Court for the Eastern District of Washington
