= GU Law School =

GU Law School may refer to:

- Georgetown University Law Center
- Gonzaga University School of Law
