= Lloyd Llewellyn Black =

American judge

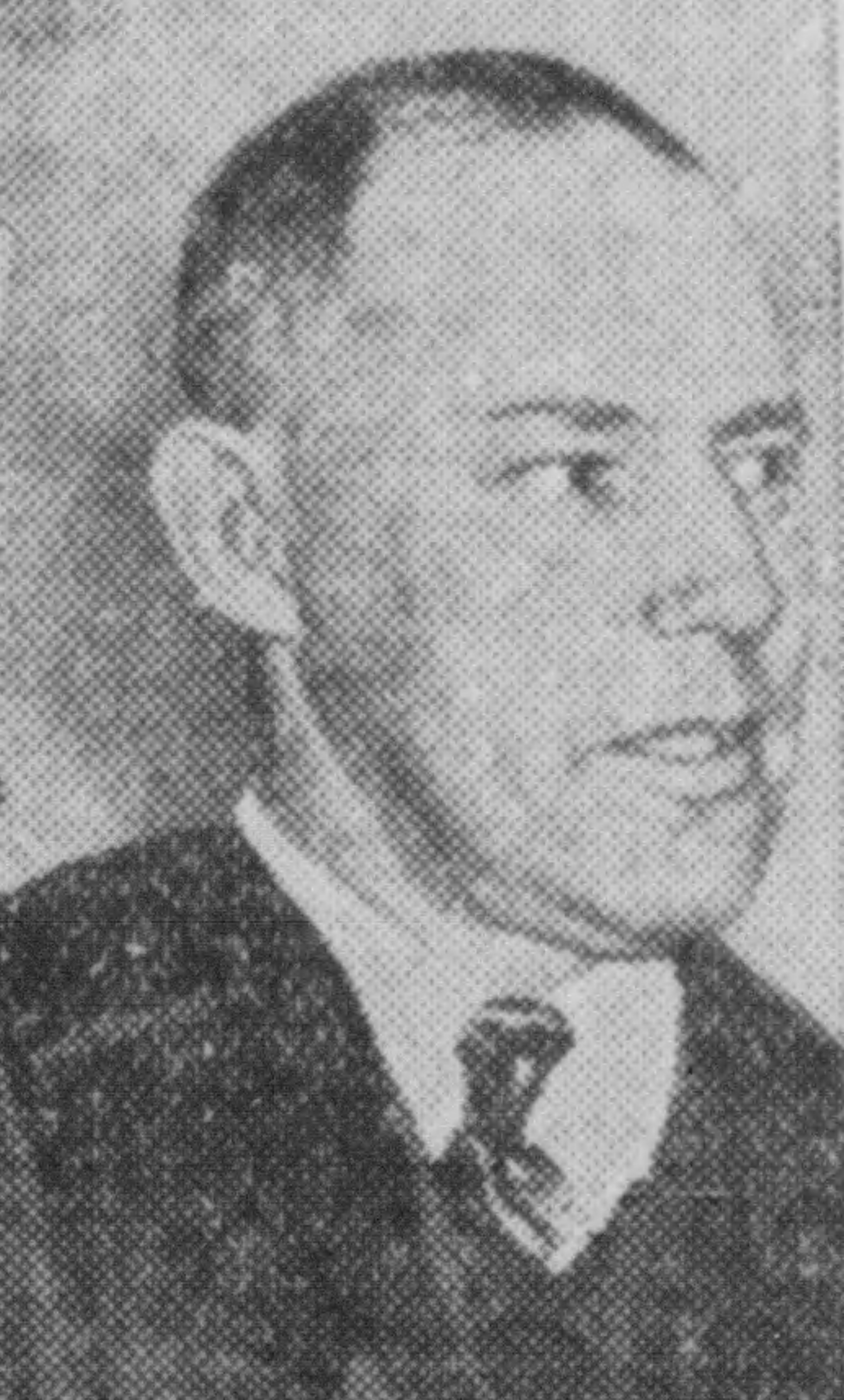

Judge of the United States District Court for the Eastern District of Washington
- In office January 20, 1940 – August 23, 1950
- Appointed by: operation of law
- Preceded by: Seat established by 54 Stat. 16
- Succeeded by: William James Lindberg

Judge of the United States District Court for the Western District of Washington
- In office August 11, 1939 – August 23, 1950
- Appointed by: Franklin D. Roosevelt
- Preceded by: Seat established by 52 Stat. 584
- Succeeded by: William James Lindberg

Personal details
- Born: Lloyd Llewellyn Black; March 15, 1889 Leavenworth, Kansas
- Died: August 23, 1950 (aged 61)
- Education: University of Washington (A.B.); University of Washington School of Law (LL.B.)

Lloyd Llewellyn Black (March 15, 1889 – August 23, 1950) was a United States district judge of the United States District Court for the Eastern District of Washington and the United States District Court for the Western District of Washington.

== Education and career ==
Born in Leavenworth, Kansas, Black received an Artium Baccalaureus degree from the University of Washington in 1910 and a Bachelor of Laws from the University of Washington School of Law in 1912. He was in private practice in Everett, Washington for various periods between 1913 and 1932. He was a special counsel to the City of Everett in 1916 and from 1920 to 1922, and a prosecuting attorney of Snohomish County, Washington from 1917 to 1919. He served in the United States Army towards the end of World War I in 1918, and was later an attorney in the United States Army at the Port of Everett from 1923 to 1936. Black was a Judge of the Superior Court for Snohomish County and Island County from 1936 to 1939.

== Federal judicial service ==
Black was nominated by President Franklin D. Roosevelt on August 2, 1939, to the United States District Court for the Western District of Washington, to a new seat authorized by 52 Stat. 584. He was confirmed by the United States Senate on August 4, 1939, and received his commission on August 11, 1939. Black was reassigned by operation of law on January 20, 1940, to serve additionally on the United States District Court for the Eastern District of Washington, to a new seat authorized by 54 Stat. 16. His service terminated on August 23, 1950, due to his death.

== Sources ==
Legal offices
Preceded by Seat established by 52 Stat. 584	Judge of the United States District Court for the Western District of Washington; 1939–1950	Succeeded by William James Lindberg
Preceded by Seat established by 54 Stat. 16	Judge of the United States District Court for the Eastern District of Washington; 1940–1950	Succeeded by William James Lindberg
