= Justin L. Quackenbush =

American judge (1929–2024)

Justin Lowe Quackenbush

Senior Judge of the United States District Court for the Eastern District of Washington
- In office June 27, 1995 – October 27, 2024

Chief Judge of the United States District Court for the Eastern District of Washington
- In office 1989–1995
- Preceded by: Robert James McNichols
- Succeeded by: William Fremming Nielsen

Judge of the United States District Court for the Eastern District of Washington
- In office June 18, 1980 – June 27, 1995
- Appointed by: Jimmy Carter
- Preceded by: Marshall Allen Neill
- Succeeded by: Robert H. Whaley

Personal details
- Born: October 3, 1929 Spokane, Washington, U.S.
- Died: October 27, 2024 (aged 95) Spokane, Washington, U.S.
- Party: Democratic
- Education: University of Idaho (BA); Gonzaga University (LLB)

Justin Lowe Quackenbush (October 3, 1929 – October 27, 2024) was a United States district judge of the United States District Court for the Eastern District of Washington. He died on October 27, 2024, aged 95.

== Life and career ==
Quackenbush was born in Spokane, Washington, on October 3, 1929. His father, Carl Quackenbush, was a law student who eventually became a Superior Court judge in Spokane. Quackenbush received a Bachelor of Arts degree from the University of Idaho in 1951. He received a Bachelor of Laws from Gonzaga University School of Law, his father's alma mater, in 1957. He was an officer in the United States Navy from 1951 to 1954. He was a deputy prosecuting attorney in Spokane County, Washington, from 1957 to 1959. He was in private practice in Spokane from 1959 until his judicial nomination. He was active in Democratic Party politics, regularly serving as the campaign manager for Tom Foley's successful Congressional election campaigns starting in 1964 for over a decade. Quackenbush also taught at Gonzaga University School of Law from 1961 to 1967, and was an active Mason.

=== Federal judicial service ===
On May 9, 1980, President Jimmy Carter nominated Quackenbush to the seat on the United States District Court for the Eastern District of Washington vacated by Judge Marshall Allen Neill. He was confirmed by the United States Senate on June 18, 1980, and received his commission the same day. Because Neill was the only judge in the district, and had died in October 1979, Quackenbush and fellow appointee Judge Robert James McNichols immediately faced a tremendous backlog of cases. Quackenbush served as chief judge from 1989 to June 27, 1995, when he assumed senior status.

=== Death ===
Quackenbush died in Spokane on October 27, 2024, at the age of 95.

== See also ==
- List of United States federal judges by longevity of service

== Sources ==
Legal offices
Preceded by Marshall Allen Neill	Judge of the United States District Court for the Eastern District of Washington; 1980–1995	Succeeded by Robert H. Whaley
Preceded by Robert James McNichols	Chief Judge of the United States District Court for the Eastern District of Washington; 1989–1995	Succeeded by William Fremming Nielsen
