= James Robart =

American judge (born 1947)

Senior Judge of the United States District Court for the Western District of Washington
- Incumbent
- Assumed office June 28, 2016

Judge of the United States District Court for the Western District of Washington
- In office June 21, 2004 – June 28, 2016
- Appointed by: George W. Bush
- Preceded by: Thomas Samuel Zilly
- Succeeded by: John H. Chun

Personal details
- Born: James Louis Robart {{Birth date and age|1947} Seattle, Washington, U.S.
- Education: Whitman College (BA); Georgetown University (JD)

James Louis Robart (born 1947) is a senior United States district judge of the United States District Court for the Western District of Washington.

== Early life and education ==
Robart was born in Seattle, Washington, in 1947. Robart's father, Victor Robart, worked for Standard Oil of California as a ship captain. James Robart grew up in the Richmond Beach neighborhood of Shoreline, Washington, and graduated from Shoreline High School, where he was student body president. He attained the rank of Eagle Scout.

Robart received a Bachelor of Arts degree magna cum laude from Whitman College in 1969 and a Juris Doctor from Georgetown University Law Center in 1973. As a student, he was a member of the Sigma Chi fraternity’s Gamma Epsilon chapter at Whitman and was administrative editor of the Georgetown Law Journal at Georgetown . He also was a legislative assistant to United States Representative John Dellenback and worked with Henry M. "Scoop" Jackson on the Alaska Native Claims Settlement Act.

== Career ==
From 1973 to 2004, Robart was in private practice in Seattle with the law firm of Lane Powell Moss & Miller (later Lane Powell Spears Lubersky LLP and then Lane Powell PC). He specialized in civil litigation. He was the chair of the firm's Litigation Department from 1992 to 1998, and was managing partner at the firm in 2003 and 2004. As an attorney, Robart tried numerous cases, including high-profile litigation related to Washington's Initiative 695, in which he successfully represented the cities of Bainbridge Island, Bremerton and Lakewood in both the trial court and the Washington Supreme Court. He did pro bono work with Evergreen Legal Services, and independently represented Southeast Asian refugees. He is a fellow of the American College of Trial Lawyers.

Robart has been president of the Seattle Children's Home and former trustee of the Children's Home Society of Washington.

Robart has been a trustee of his alma mater Whitman College, and was chair of the college's Board of Overseers.

=== Federal judicial service ===
On December 9, 2003, Robart was nominated by President George W. Bush to a seat on the United States District Court for the Western District of Washington vacated by Thomas S. Zilly. He received a unanimous "well-qualified" rating from the American Bar Association's Standing Committee on the Federal Judiciary. Robart was unanimously confirmed by the United States Senate on June 17, 2004, and received his commission on June 21, 2004. He took senior status on June 28, 2016.

=== Notable cases ===
Robart presided over a case in which a street performer (busker) raised a constitutional challenge to Seattle Center rules regulating performers' conduct. In 2005, Robart held that some of the regulations, such as those requiring performers to wear badges and barring them from performing within 30 feet of people waiting in line, were a prior restraint and violated performers' constitutional right to freedom of speech. On appeal, a three-judge panel of the Ninth Circuit initially reversed in a 2-1 decision, holding that the regulations were valid. After a rehearing en banc, the Ninth Circuit upheld Robart's ruling, concluding that the challenged rules did not "qualify as reasonable time, place, or manner restrictions" under the current record.

In 2005, in the case of ASF Inc. v. City of Seattle, Robart struck down the City of Seattle's effective ban on strip clubs, finding that the city's 17-year moratorium on granting adult entertainment licenses constituted an unconstitutional prior restraint.

In 2011, Robart dismissed a lawsuit brought by phone book companies against the City of Seattle. The companies challenged the city's law that created a "yellow book" opt-out registry, allowing residents to cancel deliveries of phone books. Robart found that the ordinance was a permissible restraint on commercial speech. On appeal, however, the U.S. Court of Appeals for the Ninth Circuit, disagreed and reversed.

In 2012 Robart presided over a breach of contract matter between Microsoft and Motorola, which determined a reasonable and non-discriminatory royalty rate for a portfolio of standard essential patents, including for several 802.11 ("WiFi") and H.264 video-encoding patents.

In August 2016, Robart presided over a 2012 consent decree requiring the Seattle Police Department to address federal allegations of police bias. During the hearing, he said "black lives matter."

Robart was assigned to Microsoft v. United States, a case brought in 2016 by Microsoft Corp. (with support by other tech companies, including Apple, Google, and Amazon) against the U.S. Department of Justice, challenging the provision of the federal Stored Communications Act that bars companies from alerting customers to secret government surveillance of their emails. In February 2017, Robart denied the government's motion to dismiss, finding that Microsoft had made a plausible First Amendment argument that these "gag orders" were akin to "permanent injunctions preventing speech from taking place before it occurs" and therefore failed strict scrutiny. Robart wrote: "The public debate has intensified as people increasingly store their information in the cloud and on devices with significant storage capacity. Government surveillance aided by service providers creates unique considerations because of the vast amount of data service providers have about their customers."

On February 3, 2017, Robart granted a temporary restraining order against President Donald Trump's executive order on travel and immigration, pending review of a lawsuit brought by Washington Attorney General Bob Ferguson. Trump responded via Twitter, calling the opinion "ridiculous" and disparaging Robart as a "so-called judge". These comments prompted criticism from some members of Congress and commentators who claimed it endangered the independence of the judiciary. On February 9, a three-judge panel of the Ninth Circuit unanimously upheld Robart's order and rejected the federal government's request for an emergency stay pending appeal.

On December 23, 2017, Robart granted a nationwide injunction that blocks the administration’s restrictions on the process of reuniting refugee families and partially lifted a ban on refugees from 11 mostly Muslim countries.

On July 24, 2020, Robart granted a restraining order on behalf of the justice department overruling a Seattle city ban on the use of teargas and impact munitions.

== Personal life ==
Robart married Mari Jalbing in November 1980. The two have been foster parents for many years, mostly for children from southeast Asia.

Robart is an avid fisherman and has for many years taken annual fishing trips to Langara Island, British Columbia. He is also a frequent reader of biographies, citing William Manchester's unfinished Churchill biography as his favorite. He is known for often wearing a bow tie along with his judicial robes.

Legal offices
| Preceded by Thomas Samuel Zilly | Judge of the United States District Court for the Western District of Washington; 2004–2016 | Succeeded by John H. Chun |
