= Robert H. Whaley =

American judge (born 1943)

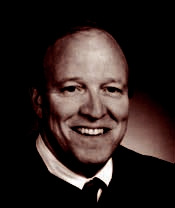

Senior Judge of the United States District Court for the Eastern District of Washington
- Incumbent
- Assumed office July 12, 2009

Chief Judge of the United States District Court for the Eastern District of Washington
- In office August 1, 2005 – July 12, 2009
- Preceded by: Frederick L. Van Sickle
- Succeeded by: Lonny R. Suko

Judge of the United States District Court for the Eastern District of Washington
- In office June 30, 1995 – July 12, 2009
- Appointed by: Bill Clinton
- Preceded by: Justin L. Quackenbush
- Succeeded by: Thomas O. Rice

Judge for the Spokane County Superior Court
- In office November 1992 – June 1995
- Preceded by: William J. Grant
- Succeeded by: Paul A. Bastine

Personal details
- Born: Robert Hamilton Whaley; April 5, 1943 (age 83) Huntington, West Virginia
- Spouse: Lucinda S. Schilling
- Education: Princeton University (AB); Emory University (JD)

Robert Hamilton Whaley (born April 5, 1943) is a senior United States district judge of the United States District Court for the Eastern District of Washington.

== Early life and education ==
Born in Huntington, West Virginia, Whaley received an Artium Baccalaureus degree from Princeton University in 1965, and a Juris Doctor from Emory University School of Law in 1968. Robert H Whaley is the son of William Whaley, an FBI agent during World War II and Carolyn Knox Whaley.

== Career ==
=== Early career ===
He served as the associate director of the Princeton Summer Camp in Blairstown, New Jersey in the summer of 1965. From 1965 to 1966, he worked as a sales clerk at the Sandy Springs Shopping Center in Atlanta, Georgia, bartended at Moe's and Joe's Highland Avenue in Atlanta, coached the YMCA Youth League at Hammond Elementary School in Atlanta, and was real estate analyst for the Shell Oil Company in Atlanta. In the summer of 1966, he was employed at the Intermountain Natural Gas Company in Boise, Idaho. In the summers of 1967 and 1968, he served as the director of the Spirit Lake Girl Scout Camp in Toutle, Washington.

=== Military service and legal career ===
Whaley was in the United States Marine Corps in 1968, and in private practice of law in Georgia from 1968 to 1969. He became a trial attorney for the Land and Natural Resources Division of the United States Department of Justice from 1969 to 1971, and then an Assistant United States Attorney for the Eastern District of Washington until 1972. He returned to private practice in Spokane, Washington from 1972 to 1992. Whaley also argued a case in front of the Supreme Court of the United States, Texaco Inc. v. Hasbrouck. The case was decided on June 14, 1990.

== Judicial service ==
=== Washington state judicial service ===
Whaley was a judge on the Superior Court of Spokane County, Washington from 1992 to 1995.

=== Federal judicial service ===
On May 24, 1995, President Bill Clinton nominated Whaley to a seat on the United States District Court for the Eastern District of Washington vacated by Justin L. Quackenbush. Whaley was confirmed by the United States Senate on June 30, 1995, and received his commission the same day. He became chief judge of the District in 2005. He assumed senior status on July 12, 2009.

== Sources ==
Legal offices
Preceded by Justin L. Quackenbush	Judge of the United States District Court for the Eastern District of Washington; 1995–2009	Succeeded by Thomas O. Rice
Preceded by Frederick L. Van Sickle	Chief Judge of the United States District Court for the Eastern District of Washington; 2005–2009	Succeeded by Lonny R. Suko
