= Edward F. Shea =

American judge (born 1942)

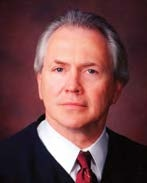

Senior Judge of the United States District Court for the Eastern District of Washington
- Incumbent
- Assumed office June 7, 2012

Judge of the United States District Court for the Eastern District of Washington
- In office April 8, 1998 – June 7, 2012
- Appointed by: Bill Clinton
- Preceded by: Alan Angus McDonald
- Succeeded by: Stanley Bastian

Personal details
- Born: June 6, 1942 (age 83) Malden, Massachusetts, U.S.
- Education: University of Massachusetts Boston (BEd); Georgetown University (JD)

Edward Francis Shea (born June 6, 1942) is a senior United States district judge of the United States District Court for the Eastern District of Washington.

== Education and career ==
Shea was born in Malden, Massachusetts. He received a Bachelor of Science in Education degree from Boston State College in 1965 and a Juris Doctor from Georgetown University Law Center in 1970. Shea was a law clerk to Judge Harold Petrie of the Washington Court of Appeals, Division II from 1970 to 1971. He was in private practice from 1971 to 1998.

=== Federal judicial service ===
On September 4, 1997, President Bill Clinton nominated Shea to serve as a United States district judge of the United States District Court for the Eastern District of Washington. He was nominated to the seat vacated by Judge Alan Angus McDonald. He was confirmed by the United States Senate on March 27, 1998, and received his commission on April 8, 1998. Shea assumed senior status on June 7, 2012.

== Sources ==
Legal offices
Preceded by Alan Angus McDonald	Judge of the United States District Court for the Eastern District of Washington; 1998–2012	Succeeded by Stanley Bastian
