= William Fremming Nielsen =

American judge (born 1934)

Senior Judge of the United States District Court for the Eastern District of Washington
- Incumbent
- Assumed office May 30, 2003

Chief Judge of the United States District Court for the Eastern District of Washington
- In office 1995–2000
- Preceded by: Justin L. Quackenbush
- Succeeded by: Frederick L. Van Sickle

Judge of the United States District Court for the Eastern District of Washington
- In office May 14, 1991 – May 30, 2003
- Appointed by: George H. W. Bush
- Preceded by: Robert James McNichols
- Succeeded by: Lonny R. Suko

Personal details
- Born: August 8, 1934 (age 91) Seattle, Washington, U.S.
- Education: University of Washington (BA, LLB)

William Fremming Nielsen (born August 8, 1934) is an inactive senior United States district judge of the United States District Court for the Eastern District of Washington.

== Education and career ==
Nielsen was born in Seattle. He received a Bachelor of Arts degree from the University of Washington in 1956 and was a United States Air Force First Lieutenant from 1956 to 1959. He received a Bachelor of Laws from the University of Washington School of Law in 1962. He was a law clerk to Judge Charles L. Powell of the United States District Court for the Eastern District of Washington from 1963 to 1964. He was in private practice in Spokane, Washington from 1964 to 1991.

=== Federal judicial service ===
Nielsen was nominated by President George H. W. Bush on March 21, 1991, to a seat on the United States District Court for the Eastern District of Washington vacated by Judge Robert James McNichols. He was confirmed by the United States Senate on May 9, 1991, and received his commission on May 14, 1991. He served as Chief Judge from 1995 to 2000. He assumed senior status on May 30, 2003, and inactive senior status on May 31, 2024.

== Sources ==
Legal offices
Preceded by Robert James McNichols	Judge of the United States District Court for the Eastern District of Washington; 1991–2003	Succeeded by Lonny R. Suko
Preceded by Justin L. Quackenbush	Chief Judge of the United States District Court for the Eastern District of Washington; 1995–2000	Succeeded by Frederick L. Van Sickle
