= Thomas O. Rice =

American judge (born 1960)

Thomas Rice
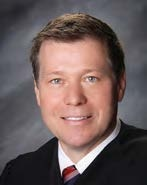

Chief Judge of the United States District Court for the Eastern District of Washington
- In office January 27, 2016 – July 24, 2020
- Preceded by: Rosanna M. Peterson
- Succeeded by: Stanley Bastian

Judge of the United States District Court for the Eastern District of Washington
- Incumbent
- Assumed office March 8, 2012
- Appointed by: Barack Obama
- Preceded by: Robert H. Whaley

Personal details
- Born: Thomas Owen Rice; December 9, 1960 (age 64); Spokane, Washington, U.S.
- Education: Gonzaga University (BBA, JD)

Thomas Owen Rice (born December 9, 1960) is a United States district judge of the United States District Court for the Eastern District of Washington.

== Early life and education ==
Born in Spokane, Washington, Rice earned a Bachelor of Business Administration degree from Gonzaga University in 1983 and a Juris Doctor from Gonzaga University School of Law in 1986.

== Career ==
From 1986 until early 1987, Rice worked for the United States Department of Justice as a trial attorney in Washington in the department's tax division. From 1987 to 2012, Rice worked in the United States Attorney's Office for the United States District Court for the Eastern District of Washington. He was an Assistant United States Attorney from 1987 to 2012. He served as the deputy criminal chief for his prosecutor's office from 2000 until 2003, and then was the criminal chief from 2003 until 2006. From 2006 until his appointment to the bench, he was a First Assistant United States Attorney.

=== Federal judicial service ===
On June 29, 2011, President Obama nominated Rice to the seat on the United States District Court for the Eastern District of Washington that had been vacated by Judge Robert H. Whaley, who assumed senior status in 2009. He received a hearing before the Senate Judiciary Committee on September 20, 2011. His nomination was reported out of committee on October 13, 2011 by voice vote. On March 6, 2012, the United States Senate confirmed Rice's nomination by a 93–4 vote. He received his commission on March 8, 2012. Rice served as Chief Judge of the court from January 27, 2016 to July 24, 2020.

In April 2023, in a lawsuit brought by 17 states and the District of Columbia, Rice issued a temporary injunction that the Food and Drug Administration should not reduce access to the abortion medication mifepristone in these states and the district.

Legal offices
Preceded by Robert H. Whaley	Judge of the United States District Court for the Eastern District of Washington; 2012–present	Incumbent
Preceded by Rosanna M. Peterson	Chief Judge of the United States District Court for the Eastern District of Washington; 2016–2020	Succeeded by Stanley Bastian
