= Rosanna M. Peterson =

American judge (born 1951)

Rosanna Peterson
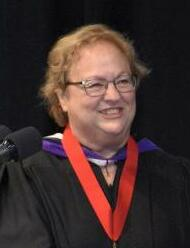
- Peterson in 2018

Senior Judge of the United States District Court for the Eastern District of Washington
- Incumbent
- Assumed office October 1, 2021

Chief Judge of the United States District Court for the Eastern District of Washington
- In office January 27, 2011 – January 27, 2016
- Preceded by: Lonny R. Suko
- Succeeded by: Thomas O. Rice

Judge of the United States District Court for the Eastern District of Washington
- In office January 26, 2010 – October 1, 2021
- Appointed by: Barack Obama
- Preceded by: Frederick L. Van Sickle
- Succeeded by: Mary Dimke

Personal details
- Born: Rosanna Malouf; 1951 (age 74–75) Salt Lake City, Utah, U.S.
- Spouse: Fredrick Peterson
- Education: University of North Dakota (BA, MA, JD)

Academic work
- Sub-discipline: Evidence law
- Institutions: Gonzaga University School of Law

Rosanna Malouf Peterson (born 1951) is a senior United States district judge of the United States District Court for the Eastern District of Washington and a former professor at Gonzaga University School of Law. She is the first female judge to serve in the Eastern District.

== Early life and education ==
Born in Salt Lake City, Peterson attended the University of Utah from 1969 until 1970 and again from 1971 until 1972. She then earned a Bachelor of Arts degree cum laude from the University of North Dakota in 1977 and a Master of Arts degree in 1983 from the school. In 1991, she earned a Juris Doctor from the University of North Dakota School of Law.

== Career ==
Peterson worked from 1975 until 1978 as an instructor with the Grand Forks, North Dakota Park District and from 1979 until 1983 as a graduate teaching assistant at the University of North Dakota. From 1984 until 1988, Peterson was a lecturer at the University of North Dakota's Department of English. During law school in 1989, she served as a judicial extern for North Dakota Judge Bruce Bohlman, and then in 1990 she served as a legal extern for United States Senator Kent Conrad. From 1991 until 1993, Peterson served as a staff attorney for United States District Court for the Eastern District of Washington Judge Frederick L. Van Sickle. Peterson then worked as an associate attorney for a Spokane law firm from 1993 until 1994 and then was a sole practitioner in 1995. She then served as an associate attorney for another Spokane law firm from 1995 until 1997, and then was partner in a different Spokane law firm from 1998 until 2002. From 1999 until present, Peterson has served as an adjunct professor (1999–2005), a visiting professor (2005–2007) and an assistant professor (2007–2010) at the Gonzaga University School of Law. She became the director of the law school's externship program in 2002.

=== Federal judicial service ===
On October 13, 2009, President Barack Obama nominated Peterson to serve as a judge on the United States District Court for the Eastern District of Washington to a seat vacated by Judge Frederick L. Van Sickle, who assumed senior status on May 1, 2008. The United States Senate confirmed Peterson on January 25, 2010 by an 89–0 vote. She received her commission on January 26, 2010. She served as Chief Judge from January 27, 2011 to January 27, 2016. She assumed senior status on October 1, 2021. As of December 2025, Peterson is listed as inactive.

=== Notable cases ===
In 2015, Peterson became a central figure in Second Amendment and Tenth Amendment protests in Spokane. Following the arrest of Anthony P. Bosworth on February 25, 2015, Peterson authored new rules banning firearms and other weapons on the grounds surrounding the Thomas S. Foley Federal Courthouse in Spokane. Bosworth's arrest and detention on February 25 led to an additional protest on March 6, 2015, where a large crowd defied the judge's order by appearing armed on the Walter F. Horan Plaza outside the courthouse.

In 2019, Peterson made national headlines when she blocked the Trump Administration from implementing its changes to the Public charge rule nationwide.

== See also ==
- List of first women lawyers and judges in Washington

Legal offices
Preceded by Frederick L. Van Sickle	Judge of the United States District Court for the Eastern District of Washington; 2010–2021	Succeeded by Mary Dimke
Preceded by Lonny R. Suko	Chief Judge of the United States District Court for the Eastern District of Washington; 2011–2016	Succeeded by Thomas O. Rice
