= Jane B. Korn =

Jane B. Korn was the first woman dean of the Gonzaga University School of Law (2011-2018). She was previously a professor and vice dean at James E. Rogers College of Law and an attorney at Davis Polk & Wardwell.

== Early life and career ==
Korn is a graduate of Rutgers University. She has a degree in law from the University of Colorado Law School, earning the distinction of Order of the Coif. Following graduation from law school, Korn clerked for the United States Court of Appeals for the Tenth Circuit in Denver, Colorado.

Korn was elected chair of the dean's section of the Association of American Law Schools (AALS).
