= Edward J. Cannon =

American lawyer

- Born: February 21, 1866
- Died: 1934 (aged 67–68)

Edward J. Cannon (born Juneau County, Wisconsin, February 21, 1866 – 1934) was the first and longest-serving dean of the Gonzaga University School of Law. He served as dean from 1912 to 1934.

== Career ==
A well respected lawyer, Cannon was lauded as "one of the brilliant members of the Spokane bar. At the time of his death in 1934, Cannon was also honored as a "model trial lawyer" by his peers.

== Personal ==
While at Gonzaga, he and his wife Helen lived in a house built in 1911, at 416 E. Rockwood Boulevard in Spokane. Now known as the Edward & Helen Cannon House, it was placed on the National Register on April 14, 1997, and the Spokane Register on February 7, 2005.
