= Lonny R. Suko =

American judge (born 1943)

Lonny Ray Suko
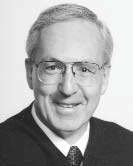

Senior Judge of the United States District Court for the Eastern District of Washington
- Incumbent
- Assumed office November 1, 2013

Chief Judge of the United States District Court for the Eastern District of Washington
- In office July 13, 2009 – January 27, 2011
- Preceded by: Robert H. Whaley
- Succeeded by: Rosanna M. Peterson

Judge of the United States District Court for the Eastern District of Washington
- In office July 16, 2003 – November 1, 2013
- Appointed by: George W. Bush
- Preceded by: William Fremming Nielsen
- Succeeded by: Salvador Mendoza Jr.

Magistrate Judge of the United States District Court for the Eastern District of Washington
- In office 1995–2003

Personal details
- Born: Lonny Ray Suko; 1943 (age 82–83) Spokane, Washington, U.S.
- Education: Washington State University (BA); University of Idaho (JD)

Lonny Ray Suko (born 1943) is a Senior United States district judge of the United States District Court for the Eastern District of Washington.

== Early life and education ==
Born in Spokane, Washington, Suko received a Bachelor of Arts degree from Washington State University in 1965 and a Juris Doctor from the University of Idaho College of Law in 1968. He was a law clerk for Judge Charles L. Powell, U.S. District Court, Eastern District of Washington from 1968 to 1969.

== Career ==
Suko was in private practice in Yakima, Washington, from 1969 to 1995. He served as a part time United States magistrate judge in the Eastern District of Washington from 1971 to 1991. He served as a full time United States magistrate judge in the Eastern District of Washington from 1995 to 2003.

=== Federal judicial service ===
On April 28, 2003, Suko was nominated by President George W. Bush to serve as a United States district judge of the United States District Court for the Eastern District of Washington. He was nominated to a seat vacated by Judge William Fremming Nielsen. He was confirmed by the United States Senate on July 15, 2003 and received his commission on July 16, 2003. Suko assumed senior status on November 1, 2013.

== Sources ==
Legal offices
Preceded by William Fremming Nielsen	Judge of the United States District Court for the Eastern District of Washington; 2003–2013	Succeeded by Salvador Mendoza Jr.
Preceded by Robert H. Whaley	Chief Judge of the United States District Court for the Eastern District of Washington; 2009–2011	Succeeded by Rosanna M. Peterson
