= United States Courthouse (Seattle) =

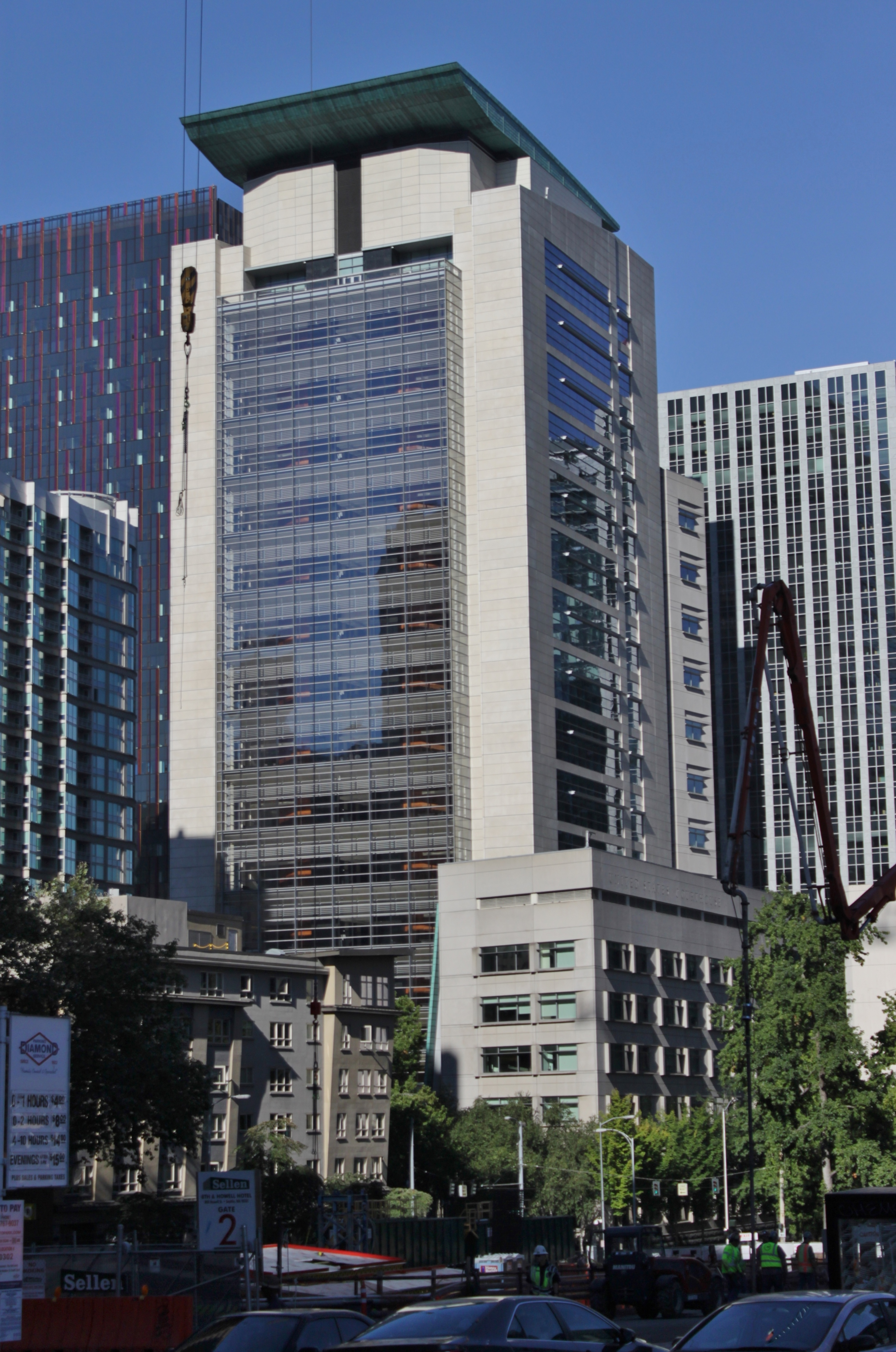

- Location within downtown Seattle

General information
- Status: Completed
- Type: Courthouse
- Location: 700 Stewart Street; Seattle, Washington
- Coordinates: 47.6151°N 122.3366°W
- Construction started: 2001
- Opened: August 17, 2004
- Cost: $171 million
- Owner: General Services Administration

Height
- Architectural: 390 feet (120 m)

Technical details
- Floor count: 23
- Floor area: 614,996 square feet (57,135.0 m^{2})

Design and construction
- Architecture firm: NBBJ
- Structural engineer: Magnusson Klemencic Associates
- Main contractor: Absher Construction

Other information
- Parking: 200 spaces

The United States Courthouse in Seattle, Washington, is a federal courthouse and office building used primarily by the United States District Court for the Western District of Washington. When it opened on August 17, 2004, at a cost of $171 million, it replaced the historic William Kenzo Nakamura United States Courthouse, which has since been transferred to the United States Court of Appeals for the Ninth Circuit. The 23-story, 390-foot (120 m) tall building houses 18 courtrooms and 22 chambers and occupies a full city block along with a landscaped public plaza.

It was designed by NBBJ and Magnusson Klemencic Associates with future expansion in mind and features engineering designed to withstand earthquakes, terrorism, and other possible threats. The General Services Administration awarded two design awards to the building in 2005 for design and construction excellence; it also received a commendation from the Seattle chapter of the American Institute of Architects for "advancing the quality of civic design".

== See also ==
- List of United States federal courthouses in Washington (state)
