= Walter T. McGovern =

American judge (1922–2021)

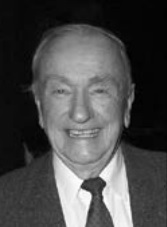

Senior Judge of the United States District Court for the Western District of Washington
- In office September 30, 1987 – July 8, 2021

Chief Judge of the United States District Court for the Western District of Washington
- In office 1975–1987
- Preceded by: William Nelson Goodwin
- Succeeded by: Barbara Jacobs Rothstein

Judge of the United States District Court for the Western District of Washington
- In office April 23, 1971 – September 30, 1987
- Appointed by: Richard Nixon
- Preceded by: William James Lindberg
- Succeeded by: Thomas Samuel Zilly

Personal details
- Born: May 24, 1922 Seattle, Washington, U.S.
- Died: July 8, 2021 (aged 99)
- Education: University of Washington (BA, LLB)

Walter Thomas McGovern (May 24, 1922 – July 8, 2021) was a United States district judge of the United States District Court for the Western District of Washington.

== Education and career ==
Born in Seattle, Washington in May 1922, McGovern received a Bachelor of Arts degree from the University of Washington in 1949 and a Bachelor of Laws from the University of Washington School of Law in 1950. He was in private practice in Seattle from 1950 to 1959. He was a judge of the Municipal Court of Seattle from 1959 to 1965, on the King County Superior Court from 1965 to 1968, and on the Washington State Supreme Court from 1968 to 1971. He was initially appointed to the state supreme court by Governor Dan Evans, to a seat vacated by the retirement of Charles T. Donworth.

== Federal judicial service ==
On March 29, 1971, McGovern was nominated by President Richard Nixon to a seat on the United States District Court for the Western District of Washington vacated by Judge William James Lindberg. McGovern was confirmed by the United States Senate on April 21, 1971, and received his commission on April 23, 1971. He served as Chief Judge from 1975 to 1987, assuming senior status on September 30, 1987. He died on July 8, 2021, at the age of 99.

== See also ==
- List of United States federal judges by longevity of service

== Sources ==
Legal offices
Preceded by William James Lindberg	Judge of the United States District Court for the Western District of Washington; 1971–1987	Succeeded by Thomas Samuel Zilly
Preceded by William Nelson Goodwin	Chief Judge of the United States District Court for the Western District of Washington; 1975–1987	Succeeded by Barbara Jacobs Rothstein
