= Alan Angus McDonald =

American judge

Senior Judge of the United States District Court for the Eastern District of Washington
- In office December 13, 1996 – July 26, 2007

Judge of the United States District Court for the Eastern District of Washington
- In office October 17, 1985 – December 13, 1996
- Appointed by: Ronald Reagan
- Preceded by: Seat established by 98 Stat. 333
- Succeeded by: Edward F. Shea

Personal details
- Born: Alan Angus McDonald; December 13, 1927 Harrah, Washington
- Died: July 26, 2007 (aged 79) Yakima, Washington
- Education: University of Washington (BS, LLB)

Alan Angus McDonald (December 13, 1927 – July 26, 2007) was a United States district judge of the United States District Court for the Eastern District of Washington.

== Education and career ==
Born in Harrah, Washington, McDonald received a Bachelor of Science degree from the University of Washington in 1950 and a Bachelor of Laws from the University of Washington School of Law in 1952. He was a deputy prosecuting attorney of Yakima County, Washington from 1952 to 1954, and was in private practice in Yakima, Washington from 1954 until 1985.

== Federal judicial service ==
On September 11, 1985, McDonald was nominated by President Ronald Reagan to a new seat on the United States District Court for the Eastern District of Washington created by 98 Stat. 333. He was confirmed by the United States Senate on October 16, 1985, and received his commission on October 17, 1985. He assumed senior status on December 13, 1996, serving in that capacity for until his death, in Yakima, on July 26, 2007.

== Accusations of racism ==
McDonald was accused in the Washington media of making racist jokes about people who appeared in his courtroom. In introducing a House Resolution condemning the actions of Judge McDonald, Rep. John Conyers (MI-D) stated that he had "made or participated in numerous communications that referred to racial, ethic and religious minorities in demeaning, stereotypical and racist language, including references to Latino defendants and lawyers as 'greasers,' an African-Americans plaintiff as 'impo-tent' and maligning Mormons, Jew and Chinese for corrupt financial practices."

== Sources ==
Legal offices
Preceded by Seat established by 98 Stat. 333	Judge of the United States District Court for the Eastern District of Washington; 1985–1996	Succeeded by Edward F. Shea
