= Frederick L. Van Sickle =

American judge (1943–2021)

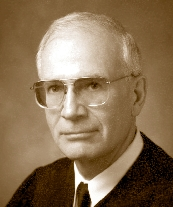

Senior Judge of the United States District Court for the Eastern District of Washington
- In office May 1, 2008 – September 2, 2021

Chief Judge of the United States District Court for the Eastern District of Washington
- In office 2000–2005
- Preceded by: William Fremming Nielsen
- Succeeded by: Robert H. Whaley

Judge of the United States District Court for the Eastern District of Washington
- In office May 14, 1991 – May 1, 2008
- Appointed by: George H. W. Bush
- Preceded by: Seat established by 104 Stat. 5089
- Succeeded by: Rosanna M. Peterson

Personal details
- Born: Frederick Leforest Van Sickle; January 31, 1943 Superior, Wisconsin
- Died: September 2, 2021 (aged 78)
- Education: University of Wisconsin (BS); University of Washington (JD)

Frederick Leforest Van Sickle (January 31, 1943 – September 2, 2021) was a United States district judge of the United States District Court for the Eastern District of Washington.

== Education and career ==
Born in Superior, Wisconsin, Van Sickle received a Bachelor of Science degree from the University of Wisconsin in 1965 and a Juris Doctor from the University of Washington School of Law in 1968. Van Sickle was a First Lieutenant in the United States Army, JAG Corps, from 1968 to 1970. He was a prosecuting attorney of Douglas County, Washington from 1971 to 1975, also working in private practice during that time.

== Judicial service ==
=== State judicial service ===
Van Sickle was a judge on the Superior Court for Grant and Douglas Counties from 1975 to 1979, and for Chelan and Douglas Counties from 1979 to 1992.

=== Federal judicial service ===
On March 21, 1991, Van Sickle was nominated by President George H. W. Bush to a new seat on the United States District Court for the Eastern District of Washington created by 104 Stat. 5089. He was confirmed by the United States Senate on May 9, 1991, and received his commission on May 14, 1991. He served as Chief Judge from 2000 to 2005, and assumed senior status on May 1, 2008. He died on September 2, 2021, aged 78.

== Sources ==
Legal offices
Preceded by Seat established by 104 Stat. 5089	Judge of the United States District Court for the Eastern District of Washington; 1991–2008	Succeeded by Rosanna M. Peterson
Preceded by William Fremming Nielsen	Chief Judge of the United States District Court for the Eastern District of Washington; 2000–2005	Succeeded by Robert H. Whaley
