= Thomas P. Amodeo =

American lawyer

Chief Judge of the Buffalo City Court
- Incumbent
- Assumed office 1994

Judge of the Buffalo City Court
- In office 1990–1994

Personal details
- Born: 1951 (age 74–75) Buffalo, New York, U.S.A.
- Party: Democratic
- Spouse(s): Joan Linda Chmielowiec m. 22 June 1974
- Children: 3 (Kristin Golding, Thomas John Amodeo, John Amodeo)
- Education: Canisius College (BA, 1973); Gonzaga University (JD, 1976)
- Occupation: Lawyer, Judge

Thomas P. Amodeo (born 1951) is a lawyer and the current Chief Judge of Buffalo City Court, a position he has held since 1994.

== Biography ==
Thomas P. Amodeo went to Canisius College for undergraduate studies, graduating in 1973. He attended Gonzaga University School of Law, obtaining his Juris Doctor in 1976.

From 1979 to 1985, he was a partner at "Amodeo & Gucciardo." In 1981, he became the General Counsel of the New York State Senate and served until 1985. During this time, he was also the attorney for Buffalo Urban Renewal (1984-1985). 1985 to 1990, until his appointment by the mayor of Buffalo to the Buffalo City Court, he was the "Assistant Corporation Counsel" for the City of Buffalo.

In 1990, he was appointed by then mayor James D. Griffin to the Buffalo City Court. In 1994, under Anthony Masiello, he became the Chief Judge of Buffalo City Court. In addition to Chief Judge duties, Amodeo is also the "Supervising Judge of City Courts" for the 8th Judicial District of New York, which includes Allegany, Cattaraugus, Chautauqua, Erie, Genesee, Niagara, Orleans & Wyoming Counties.

In 2014, Amodeo was rated "Outstanding," by the Erie County Bar Association, its highest rating.

== Judicial experience ==
- Acting Judge, Erie County Court, Appointed, 2003 to Present
- Chief Judge, Buffalo City Court, Elected, 1995 to 2014
- Chief Judge, Buffalo City Court, Appointed by Mayoral Appt., 1994 to 1995
- Judge, Buffalo City Court, Elected, 1991 to 1994
- Judge, Buffalo City Court, Appointed by Mayoral Appt., 1990 to 1991

== Professional civic activities, honors, and awards ==
- Member, N.Y. S Assoc. of City Court Judges, 1990–present
- Director, member, N.Y.S. Assoc. Drug Treat Ct. Professionals, 1999–present
- Member, National Assoc. Drug Ct. Professionals, 1996–present
- Chair, Criminal Law Adv. Bd., Erie Community College, 1994–present
- Member, The Justinian Society, 1981–present
- Member, Advocates Club, 2004–present
- Director, past president, North Buffalo Community Center, 1978–present
- Director, coach, Hertel North Park Youth Baseball, 1984–present
- Co-founder, director, North Buffalo Youth Hockey, 1990 - 1998
- Co-founder, former director, North Buffalo Boosters, 1976 - 1990
- Member, former director, Forest District Civic Association, 1990–present
- Co-founder, former director, Buffalo Italian Festival, 1989–present

== See also ==
- Politics and Government of Buffalo, New York
