= Robert James McNichols =

American judge

Senior Judge of the United States District Court for the Eastern District of Washington
- In office April 20, 1991 – January 20, 1993

Chief Judge of the United States District Court for the Eastern District of Washington
- In office 1980–1989
- Preceded by: Marshall Allen Neill
- Succeeded by: Justin Lowe Quackenbush

Judge of the United States District Court for the Eastern District of Washington
- In office December 10, 1979 – April 20, 1991
- Appointed by: Jimmy Carter
- Preceded by: Seat established by 92 Stat. 1629
- Succeeded by: William Fremming Nielsen

Personal details
- Born: Robert James McNichols; April 19, 1922 Bonners Ferry, Idaho
- Died: December 20, 1992 (aged 70) Spokane, Washington
- Resting place: St. Thomas Cemetery; Coeur d'Alene
- Relatives: Raymond Clyne McNichols
- Education: Gonzaga University School of Law (LLB)

Robert James McNichols (April 19, 1922 – December 20, 1992) was a United States district judge of the United States District Court for the Eastern District of Washington.

== Education and career ==
McNichols was born in Bonners Ferry, Idaho. He was in the United States Army during World War II, from 1940 to 1941 and from 1943 to 1946 and became a technician fifth grade. He attended Washington State College in Pullman, Washington and the Gonzaga University School of Law in Spokane, Washington. Following his first year as a law student in 1949, he worked for the Spokane Stock Exchange as a quotation clerk, and received a Bachelor of Laws from Gonzaga in 1952. McNichols was a law clerk to Washington Supreme Court Justice Edward Schaellenback in 1952. He was a deputy prosecuting attorney of Spokane County from 1953 to 1954, and was in private practice in Spokane with the firm of Winston and Cashatt for 24 years, from 1955 to 1979.

== Federal judicial service ==
McNichols was nominated by President Jimmy Carter on November 6, 1979, to the United States District Court for the Eastern District of Washington, to a new seat created earlier that year by 92 Stat. 1629. He was confirmed by the United States Senate on December 5, 1979, and received his commission on December 10, 1979, and was sworn in on January 4, 1980. He was Chief Judge from 1980 to 1989, and assumed senior status on April 20, 1991. He served in that capacity for twenty months, until his death from lung cancer in Spokane on December 20, 1992. He is buried in Idaho at the St. Thomas Cemetery in Coeur d'Alene.

== Family ==
McNichols' older brother Raymond Clyne McNichols (1914–1985) was also a federal judge, in Idaho. During his investiture to the federal bench in January 1980, the elder swore the younger in.

Legal offices
Preceded by Seat established by 92 Stat. 1629	Judge of the United States District Court for the Eastern District of Washington; 1979–1991	Succeeded by William Fremming Nielsen
Preceded by Marshall Allen Neill	Chief Judge of the United States District Court for the Eastern District of Washington; 1980–1989	Succeeded by Justin Lowe Quackenbush
