= William K. Nakamura =

United States Army Medal of Honor recipient

William Kenzo Nakamura
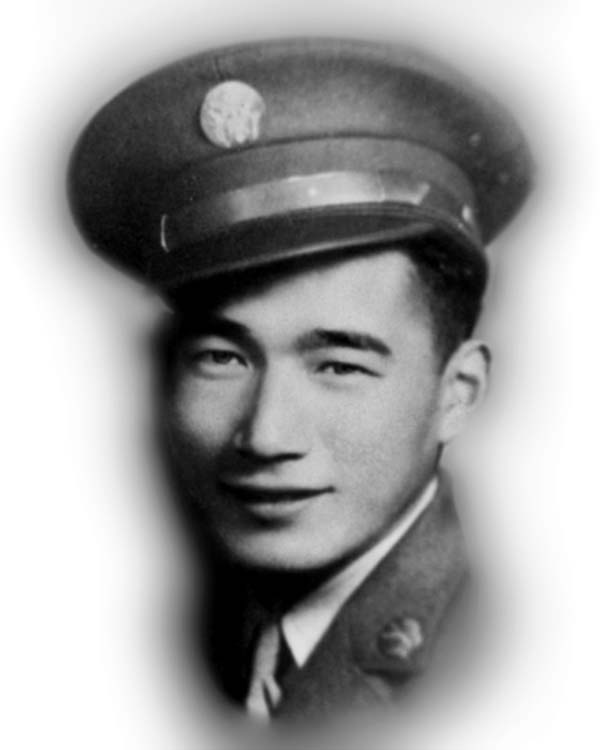
- Private First Class William Nakamura
- Born: January 21, 1922
- Died: July 4, 1944 (aged 22) near Castellina Marittima, Italy
- Burial place: Evergreen-Washelli Memorial Park, Seattle, Washington
- Military career
- Allegiance: United States of America
- Branch: United States Army
- Service years: 1943–1944
- Rank: Private First Class
- Unit: 442nd Regimental Combat Team
- Conflicts: World War II
- Awards: Medal of Honor

William Kenzo Nakamura (Japanese: 中村 健造, January 21, 1922 – July 4, 1944) was a United States Army soldier and a recipient of the United States military's highest decoration—the Medal of Honor—for his actions in World War II.

== Early life ==
Nakamura, a Nisei, was born in Seattle's Japantown (in what's now known as the International District) to Japanese immigrant parents. He attended Seattle's Washington Middle School and graduated from its Garfield High School. He attended the University of Washington and lived in the University Students Club, a fraternal association for Japanese-American students.

Nakamura's family was interned in Minidoka in Idaho during World War II, starting in 1942, following the signing of Executive Order 9066.

== Military career ==
Nakamura joined the US Army in July 1943.

Nakamura volunteered to be part of the all-Nisei 442nd Regimental Combat Team. This army unit was mostly made up of Japanese Americans from Hawaii and the mainland.

On July 4, 1944, Nakamura was serving as a private first class in the 442nd Regimental Combat Team. On that day, near Castellina Marittima, Italy, he single-handedly destroyed an enemy machine gun emplacement and later volunteered to cover his unit's withdrawal. He was then killed while attacking another machine gun nest which was firing on his platoon.

For his actions in July 1944, he was posthumously awarded the Army's second-highest decoration, the Distinguished Service Cross. A 1990s review of service records for Asian Americans who received the Distinguished Service Cross during World War II led to Nakamura's award being upgraded to the Medal of Honor. In a ceremony at the White House on June 21, 2000, his surviving family was presented with his Medal of Honor by President Bill Clinton. Twenty-one other Asian Americans also received the medal during the ceremony, all but seven of them posthumously.

Nakamura, aged 22 at his death, was buried in Evergreen-Washelli Memorial Park, Seattle, Washington.

The William Kenzo Nakamura United States Courthouse in Seattle, Washington is named in his honor.

== Medal of Honor citation ==
Private First Class Nakamura's official Medal of Honor citation reads:

Private First Class William K. Nakamura distinguished himself by extraordinary heroism in action on 4 July 1944, near Castellina, Italy. During a fierce firefight, Private First Class Nakamura's platoon became pinned down by enemy machine gun fire from a concealed position. On his own initiative, Private First Class Nakamura crawled 20 yards toward the hostile nest with fire from the enemy machine gun barely missing him. Reaching a point 15 yards from the position, he quickly raised himself to a kneeling position and threw four hand grenades, killing or wounding at least three of the enemy soldiers. The enemy weapon silenced, Private First Class Nakamura crawled back to his platoon, which was able to continue its advance as a result of his courageous action. Later, his company was ordered to withdraw from the crest of a hill so that a mortar barrage could be placed on the ridge. On his own initiative, Private First Class Nakamura remained in position to cover his comrades' withdrawal. While moving toward the safety of a wooded draw, his platoon became pinned down by deadly machine gun fire. Crawling to a point from which he could fire on the enemy position, Private First Class Nakamura quickly and accurately fired his weapon to pin down the enemy machine gunners. His platoon was then able to withdraw to safety without further casualties. Private First Class Nakamura was killed during this heroic stand. Private First Class Nakamura's extraordinary heroism and devotion to duty are in keeping with the highest traditions of military service and reflect great credit on him, his unit, and the United States Army.

== Awards and decorations ==

| Badge | Combat Infantryman Badge | | |
| 1st row | Medal of Honor | | |
| 2nd row | Bronze Star Medal | Purple Heart | Army Good Conduct Medal |
| 3rd row | American Campaign Medal | European–African–Middle Eastern Campaign Medal with 1 Campaign star | World War II Victory Medal |

== University of Washington Medal of Honor Memorial ==
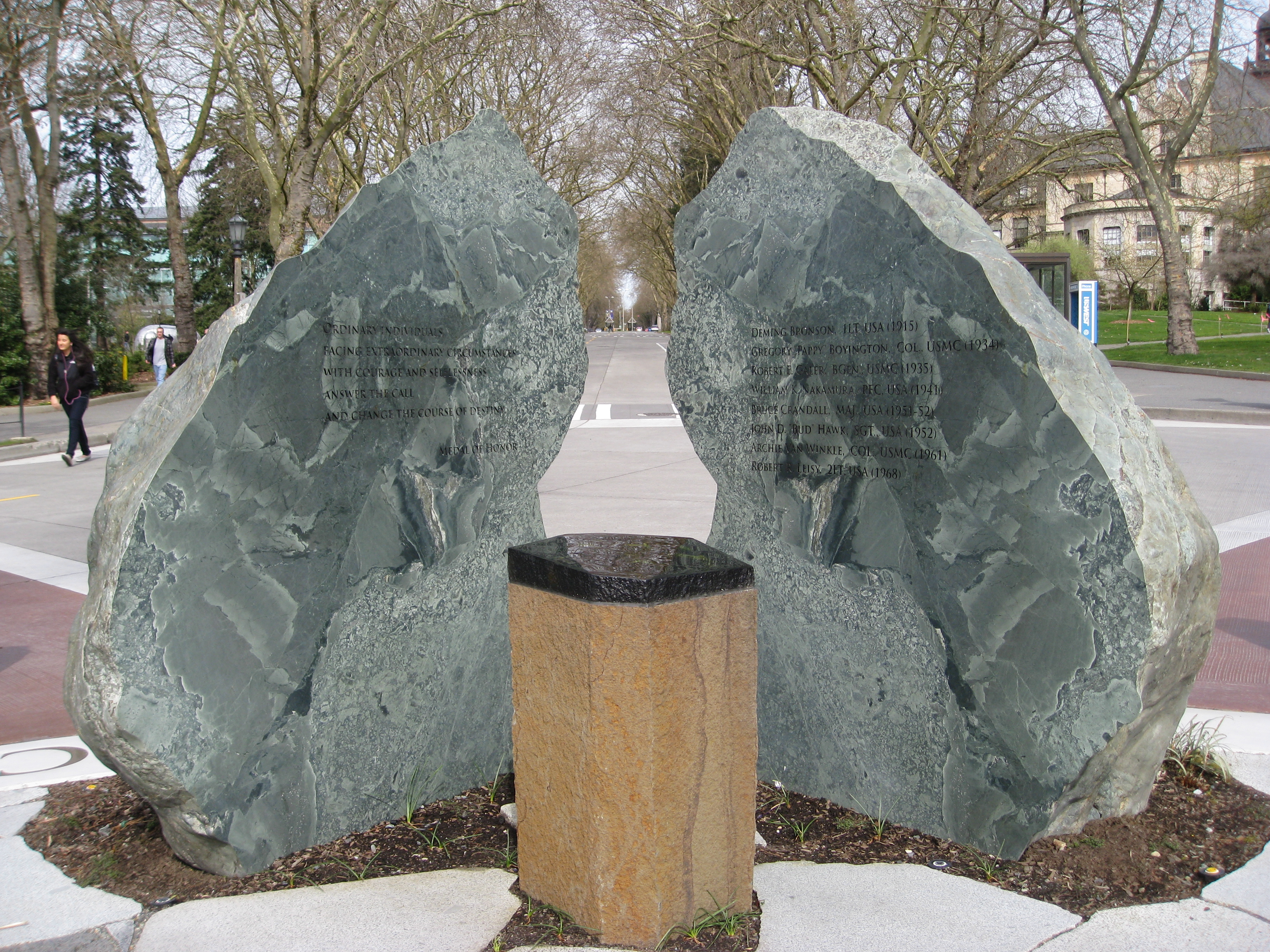
Medal of Honor memorial at the University of Washington

At the University of Washington in February 2006, a resolution recommending a memorial be erected to honor fighter ace and alumnus Pappy Boyington for his service during World War II was raised and defeated during a meeting of the student senate. Some people did not believe the resolution's sponsor had fully addressed the financial and logistical problems of installing a memorial, and some were questioning the widely held assumption that all warriors and acts of war are automatically worthy of memorialization.

The story was picked up by some blogs and conservative news outlets, focusing on two statements made by student senators during the meeting. One student senator, Ashley Miller, said that the UW already had many monuments to "rich, white men" (Boyington claimed partial Sioux ancestry and was not rich); another, Jill Edwards, questioned whether the UW should memorialize a person who killed others, summarized in the minutes as saying "she didn't believe a member of the Marine Corps was an example of the sort of person UW wanted to produce."

After its defeat, a new version of the original resolution was submitted that called for a memorial to all eight UW alumni who received the Medal of Honor after attending the UW. On April 4, 2006, the resolution passed by a vote of 64 to 14 with several abstentions, on a roll call vote. The University of Washington Medal of Honor memorial was constructed at the south end of Memorial Way (17th Ave NE), north of Red Square, in the interior of a traffic circle between Parrington and Kane Halls (47.6573°N 122.3097°W). Privately funded, it was completed in time for a Veterans Day dedication in November 2009. In addition to Greg Boyington, it honors Deming Bronson, Bruce Crandall, Robert Galer, John Hawk, Robert Leisy, Archie Van Winkle, and Nakamura.

Ordinary individuals
facing extraordinary circumstances
with courage and selflessness
answer the call
and change the course of destiny.
Medal of Honor

== See also ==
- List of Asian American Medal of Honor recipients
- List of Medal of Honor recipients for World War II
