= Politics and government of Buffalo, New York =

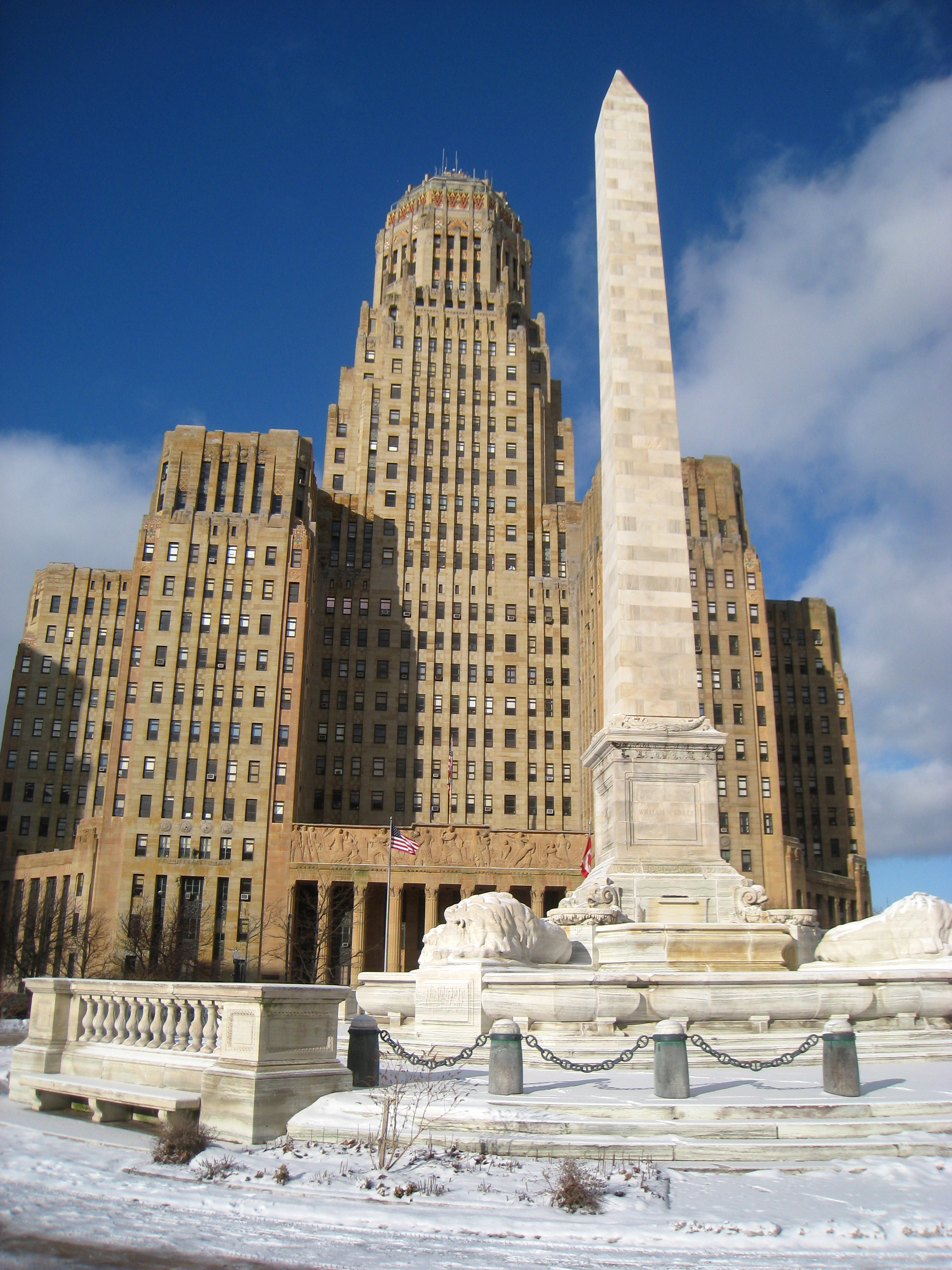
Buffalo City Hall, with McKinley Monument in the foreground.

The American city of Buffalo, New York's government is run by a democratically elected mayor and council of nine members.

== Local government ==
Buffalo has a strong mayor–council government. As the chief executive of city government, the mayor oversees the heads of the city's departments, participates in ceremonies, boards and commissions, and serves as the liaison between the city and local cultural institutions. Some agencies, including those for utilities, urban renewal and public housing are state- and federally-funded public-benefit corporations, semi-independent from city government. With its nine districts, the Buffalo Common Council enacts laws, levies taxes, and approves mayoral appointees and the city budget. Joel P. Feroleto is the sitting council president. Generally reflecting the politics of the city's electorate, all nine council members are members of the Democratic Party. Buffalo also serves as the seat of Erie County and is within five of the county's eleven legislative districts.

U.S. President Grover Cleveland's short stint as mayor in 1881 grew his stature statewide for opposing local political machines. This culminated with his party nomination and election as governor in 1883. During the late 1970s, Jimmy Griffin presided over the decline of the city's economy and population while also developing the plans that would later evolve into the city's medical campus, theater district and revitalized waterfront. After Griffin, Anthony Masiello was elected in the early 1990s and faced layoffs, budget cuts, and the state-operated Buffalo Fiscal Stability Authority, formed to prevent a potential bankruptcy in the early 2000s. Byron Brown was the city's first African-American and longest-serving mayor, held the office between 2006 and 2024; during his mayoralty, Buffalo had its first population gain in 70 years. No Republican has served as mayor since Chester A. Kowal in 1965.

At the state level, Buffalo is within the Eighth Judicial District. Court cases handled at the city level include misdemeanors, violations, housing matters, and claims under $15,000; more severe cases are handled at the county level. Portions of Buffalo are represented by members of the New York State Assembly and New York State Senate. At the federal level, the city comprises the majority of New York's 26th congressional district and has been represented by Democrat Tim Kennedy since 2024.

Federal offices in the city include the Buffalo District of the United States Army Corps of Engineers' Great Lakes and Ohio River Division, the Federal Bureau of Investigation, and the United States District Court for the Western District of New York.

In 2020, the city spent $519 million as it handled the effects of the COVID-19 pandemic. The 2021–22 city budget has been proposed at $534.5 million, a 2.3% increase over 2020, supplemented by about $50 million in federal stimulus money. The proposal includes a slight raise for the commercial tax, with a slight decrease in the residential tax to compensate for the pandemic.

== Elected officials ==
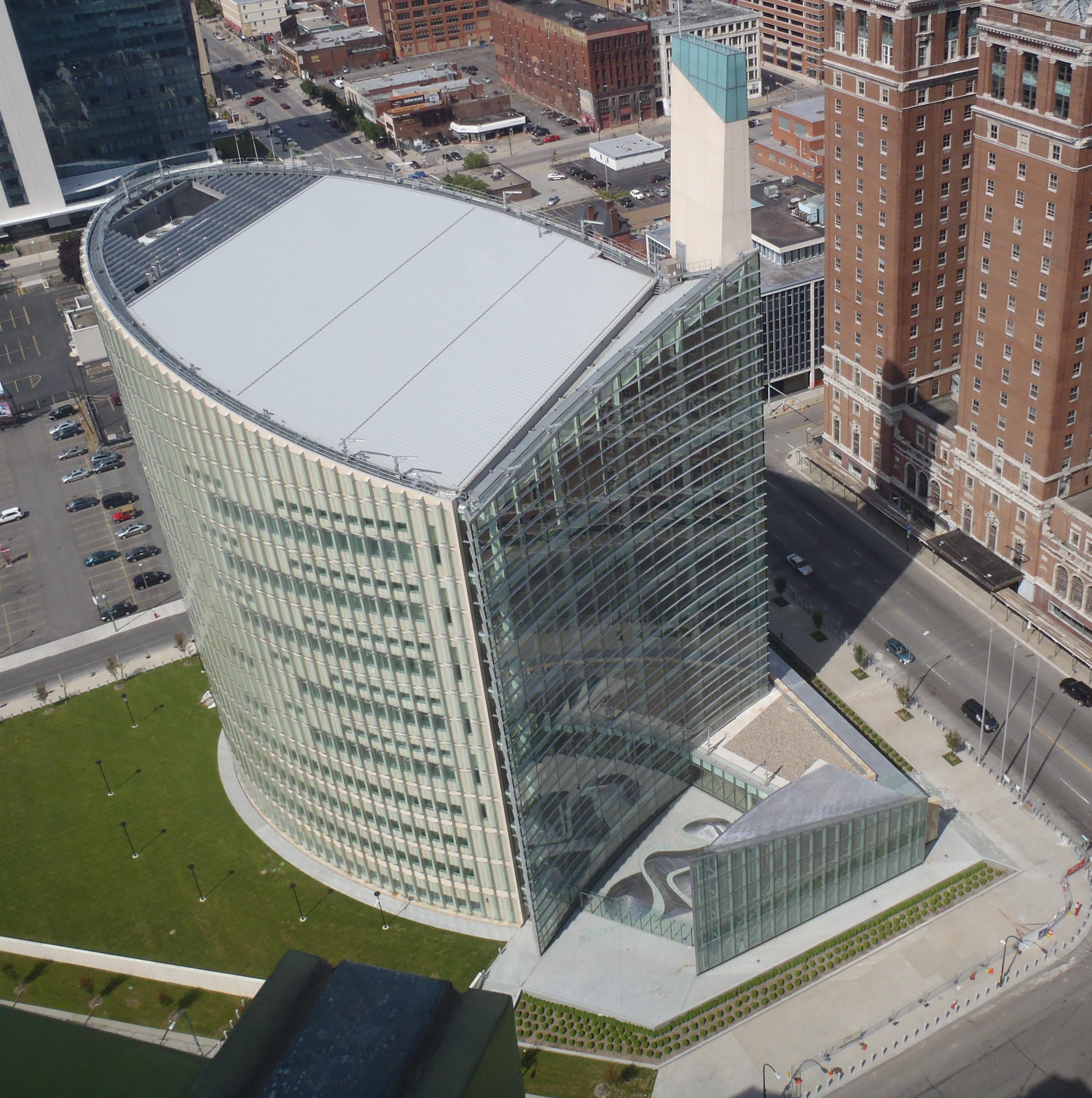
Robert H. Jackson United States Courthouse

Buffalo is the largest of the three cities (Buffalo, Lackawanna, and Tonawanda) within, and is the seat of, Erie County. The municipal government of the City of Buffalo consists of:

Department	Office Holder	Party
Mayor of Buffalo	Sean Ryan	D
Buffalo Common Council	Joel P. Feroleto (President); Bryan J. Bollman; Mitchell P. Nowakowski; Joseph Golombek Jr. Zeneta B. Everhart (President Pro-Tempore); David A. Rivera; Leah M. Halton-Pope (Majority Leader); Rasheed Wyatt; Mitch Nowakowski	D D D D D D D D D
Buffalo Comptroller	Barbara Miller-Williams	D
City Court Judges	Hon. Thomas P. Amodeo (Chief Judge); Hon. Betty Calvo-Torres; Hon. Patrick M. Carney; Hon. Susan Eagan; Hon. Joseph A. Fiorella; Hon. Debra Givens; Hon. Craig D. Hannah; Hon. Barbara Johnson-Lee; Hon. Kevin J. Keane; Hon. Amy C. Martoche; Hon. James A. W. McLeod; Hon. JaHarr Pridgen; Hon. Robert T. Russell, Jr. Hon. Diane Wray	

== State elected officials ==
At the state level, Buffalo is represented in the New York State Senate and the New York State Assembly by:

- 2 state senators (60th District and 58th District) in Albany
- 4 assemblymembers (141st District, 142nd District, 144th District and 145th District)

The city is set in one United States House of Representatives congressional district:

- The 26th (which contains virtually all of Buffalo, which is located in Erie County.

== City departments ==
As of October 2015, the Buffalo city government includes:

Department
Administration, Finance, Policy and Urban Affairs
Assessment and Taxation Department
Audit & Control
Board of Education
Buffalo Arts Commission
Buffalo Police Department
Buffalo Sewer Authority
Buffalo Urban Renewal Agency (BURA)
Buffalo Water Authority
Citizen Services
Office of City Clerk
Civil Service
Commission on Citizens' Rights and Community Relations
Community Services and Recreational Programming
Emergency Management Services
Buffalo Fire Department
Human Resources
Law Department
Management Information Systems
Office of Senior Services
Office of Strategic Planning
Parking Department
Permit and Inspection Services
Public Works, Parks & Streets
Real Estate
Telecommunications, Utilities and Franchises

== History ==
Buffalo has a rich and infamous history with presidential politics. Two presidents hail from Buffalo: Millard Fillmore (13th President) and Grover Cleveland (22nd and 24th President), Cleveland served as the 35th Mayor of Buffalon 1882; another President was assassinated at the Pan-American Exposition in Buffalo in 1901: William McKinley (25th President).

In 1910, the city had a Common Council and a Board of Alderman. The alderman were elected from 25 wards to form the Board of Alderman. The board had 23 committees. The Common Council consisted of 8 elected councilors. In addition to the mayor, the voters elected the following executive branch officials, corporate counsel, superintendent of education, overseer of the poor, commissioner of public works, the comptroller, treasurer and the three assessor of the Board of Assessors. The comptroller and treasurer were both members of the Board of Finance. The mayor appointed the members of the boards of fire commissioners (of which the mayor is a member), police, school examiners, jubilee water commissioner, plumbing and water commissioners and the board of trustees for the Grosvernor Library and the commissioners on the civil service and playground commissions. The mayor also appointed the health commissioner, superintendent of markets, examiner of street engines, inspector of steam boilers, harbor master and oil inspector. The board of health consisted of the mayor, health commissioner and commissioner of public works. Along with his two mayoral appointed directors, the mayor, superintendent of education and another official serves as directors of public library. The city had seven all ex officio boards on which the mayor served on all but the back tax commission, which consisted of the comptroller, counsel and an assessor.

== See also ==
- Buffalo Fire Department
- Buffalo Common Council
- List of mayors of Buffalo, New York
