= Thomas Samuel Zilly =

American judge (born 1935)

Senior Judge of the United States District Court for the Western District of Washington
- Incumbent
- Assumed office January 1, 2004

Judge of the United States District Court for the Western District of Washington
- In office April 20, 1988 – January 1, 2004
- Appointed by: Ronald Reagan
- Preceded by: Walter T. McGovern
- Succeeded by: James Robart

Personal details
- Born: Thomas Samuel Zilly; 1935 (age 90–91) Detroit, Michigan
- Education: University of Michigan (BA); Cornell University (JD)

Thomas Samuel Zilly (born 1935) is a senior United States district judge of the United States District Court for the Western District of Washington.

== Education and career ==
Zilly was born in Detroit. He received a Bachelor of Arts degree from the University of Michigan in 1956 and a Juris Doctor from Cornell Law School in 1962. He was a United States Naval Reserve Lieutenant (J.G.) from 1956 to 1962, serving on active duty from 1956 to 1959. He entered private practice in Seattle, Washington, working from 1962 to 1988 at the law firm Lane Powell Moss & Miller. He was a Judge pro tem of the Seattle Municipal Court from 1972 to 1980.

Zilly served as president of the Seattle-King County Bar Association in 1986-1987 and on multiple Washington State Bar Association committees, including as a hearing officer for its disciplinary board and as a bar examiner.

=== Federal judicial service ===
On February 16, 1988, Zilly was nominated by President Ronald Reagan to a seat on the United States District Court for the Western District of Washington vacated by Judge Walter T. McGovern. A hearing on his nomination was held on March 28, 1988, and the Senate Judiciary Committee approved it on April 14, 1988. Zilly was confirmed by the United States Senate on April 19, 1988, and received his commission the following day. He assumed senior status on January 1, 2004.

=== Notable rulings ===
In November 1988 Zilly ruled that the US Fish and Wildlife Service had unlawfully failed to list the northern spotted owl under the Endangered Species Act.

In August 1997, Zilly certified a class-action lawsuit by 64 prison inmates who alleged they had been subjected to X-ray bombardment of their testes during a Cold War experiment conducted at the Washington State Penitentiary at Walla Walla during the 1960s.

In June 2002, Zilly ruled that the University of Washington had not engaged in "reverse discrimination" against white law school admission aspirants who had not been admitted to the class entering in fall 1994.

On January 28, 2017, Zilly ordered a temporary injunction preventing the removal from the United States of two Yemeni citizens under Donald Trump's order to ban all immigration from seven predominantly Muslim nations.

In February 2019, Zilly ordered the Department of Defense not to discriminate against U.S. armed forces members who are naturalized citizens by requiring them to undergo periodic security checks. The plaintiffs in the case were 17 individuals who had enlisted via the Military Accessions Vital to the National Interest (MAVNI) program.

In September 2020, Zilly denied a government motion to dismiss a civil rights lawsuit filed by the family of Che Andre Taylor, who had been shot dead by Seattle police officers in 2016.

Zilly presided over the first trial in the Western District of Washington ever conducted via the online platform Zoom during October 2020.

== Sources ==
Legal offices
Preceded by Walter T. McGovern	Judge of the United States District Court for the Western District of Washington; 1988–2004	Succeeded by James Robart
