= William Kenzo Nakamura United States Courthouse =

Federal courthouse in Seattle, Washington

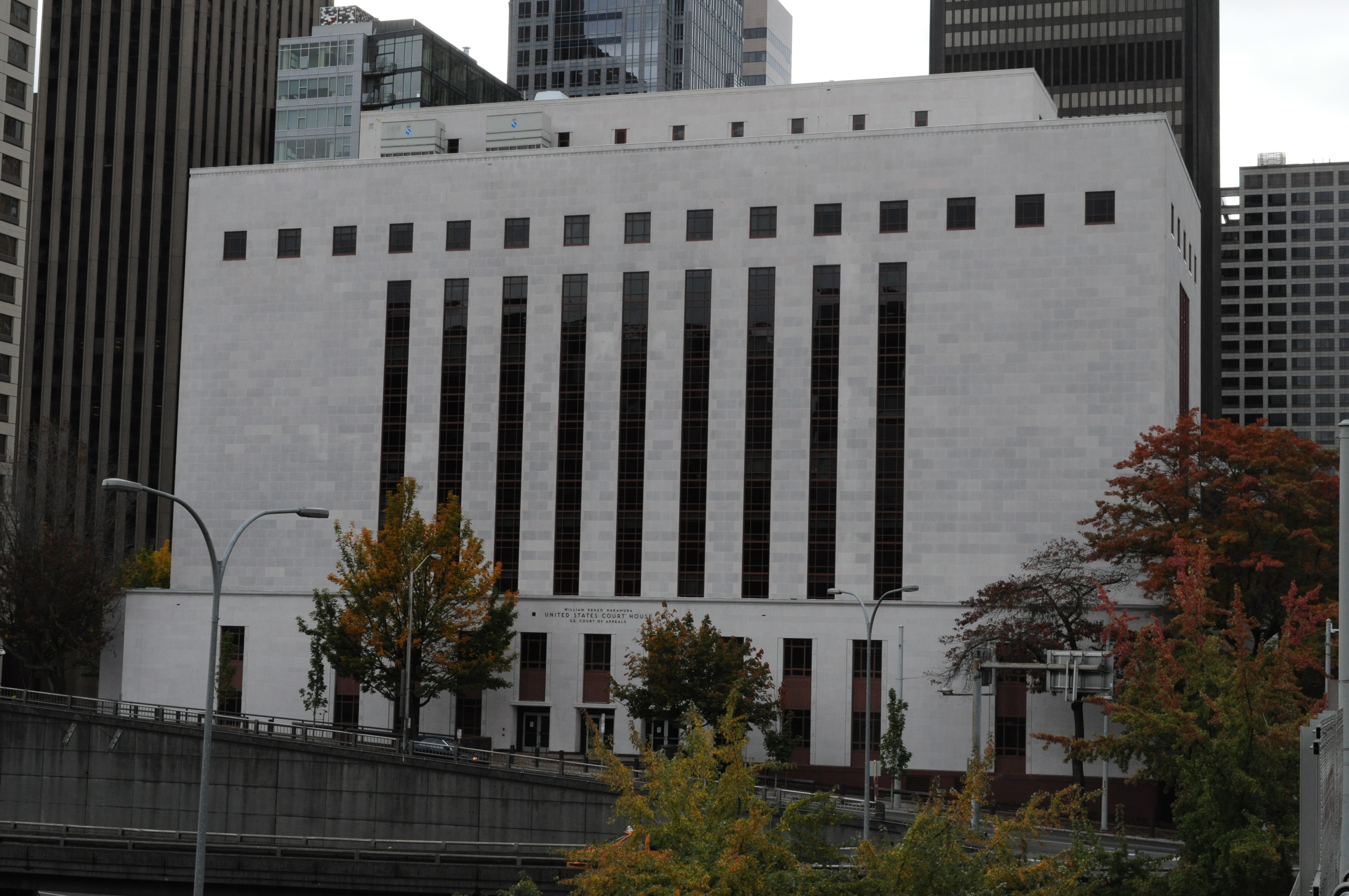
- Interactive map of the William Kenzo Nakamura United States Courthouse area
- Former names: United States Courthouse

General information
- Status: Completed
- Type: Courthouse
- Architectural style: Art deco, PWA Moderne
- Location: 1010 5th Avenue; Seattle, Washington
- Named for: William Kenzo Nakamura
- Construction started: 1936
- Completed: August 1940
- Renovated: 1983-1984, 2006-2009
- Cost: $1.7 million
- Renovation cost: $71 million(2006-2009)
- Owner: General Services Administration

Technical details
- Material: Concrete & Terracotta
- Floor count: 10, 13
- Floor area: 190,000 square feet (18,000 m^{2})

Design and construction
- Architects: Gilbert Stanley Underwood, Weinstein A/U Architects-Urban Design, Seattle (2006-2009 renovation)

Other information
- Number of rooms: 5 courtrooms
- U.S. Courthouse
- U.S. National Register of Historic Places
- Location within Washington (state)
- Location: Seattle, Washington
- Coordinates: 47°36′26″N 122°19′53″W
- Built: 1936-1940
- NRHP reference No.: 80004003
- Added to NRHP: January 8, 1980

The William Kenzo Nakamura United States Courthouse is a federal courthouse in Seattle, Washington primarily used by the United States Court of Appeals for the Ninth Circuit. Built in 1940 as the United States Courthouse to consolidate federal agencies within the city, it was renamed for Medal of Honor recipient William K. Nakamura in 2001. The Ninth Circuit started using the building in the 1970s and became the principal tenant in 2004 when most other users moved to the new 23-story United States Courthouse in the Denny Triangle.

The 10-story Art Deco building at 1010 Fifth Avenue houses 5 courtrooms and is one of four regular meeting places for the Ninth Circuit, where appeals from northern Districts are heard. With a mix of Neoclassical and modern abstract features, the Nakamura Courthouse overlooks a large sloping lawn (landscaped with a large central walkway, planters, hedges, and oak trees) which has become one of the more significant public green spaces in downtown Seattle.

== History ==
Approved by Congress in 1936, with construction begun in 1936 and completed in 1940, the United States Courthouse in Seattle was the first single-purpose federal courthouse in the western United States. The building represents the United States' commitment to democratic ideals and evokes the stability, permanence, and authority of the federal government.

Opened ten years after the Great Depression halted virtually all Seattle construction, the building signaled the potential for new growth in downtown Seattle and substantial federal investment in the region. Constructed on the former site of Seattle's first hospital, the Courthouse cost $1.7 million to complete and brought together federal agencies previously scattered throughout the city. These included the Federal Bureau of Investigation, Clerk's Office, Probation Office, United States Secret Service, and the Alcohol Tax Unit. Additionally, naturalization ceremonies for immigrants to the Pacific Northwest occurred here. The United States Court of Appeals for the Ninth Circuit moved into the courthouse in the early 1970s.

The building interior was renovated in 1983–1984. In 2001, the Courthouse was renamed to honor Seattle native Private First Class William Kenzo Nakamura. Before joining the U.S. Army in 1942, Nakamura and his Japanese family were sent to a Japanese American internment camp. He was killed near Castellina, Italy on July 4, 1944, while singlehandedly protecting his platoon by his own initiative. Nakamura was posthumously awarded the Medal of Honor in 2000.

Most tenants moved to the new United States Courthouse in the Denny Triangle starting in August 2004, and the Nakamura Courthouse underwent extensive renovations from 2006 to 2009. It now serves as one of four regular meeting places for the Ninth Circuit and houses the chambers of Seattle-based judges. Along with Pioneer Courthouse in Portland, Oregon, this is where appeals are heard from the northern Districts (Oregon, Washington, Idaho, Montana, and Alaska) of the Ninth Circuit.

== Architecture ==
The southwestern side of the building with its lawn and walkway

Located at the eastern edge of a large site in Seattle's Central Business District, the courthouse's expansive lawn, with views of Elliott Bay to the west, is a distinctive open space in the densely developed district. The consulting design architect was Gilbert Stanley Underwood, who designed numerous Union Pacific railroad stations and the Neoclassical Modernist San Francisco Mint of 1936–1937. The building's final plans were likely approved by Supervising Architect of the Treasury Louis A. Simon, who in the 1930s went to Europe to study emerging Modern design techniques with a goal of incorporating them into new federal architecture. This experience shaped the use of modernized Classicism on hundreds of federal buildings with designs Simon oversaw in the 1930s and 1940s.

The courthouse is ten stories with a penthouse, creating a monumental and restrained but modern presence. Its elevations are of a solid, symmetrical, Neoclassical massing. Its east-facing facade presents the illusion of an elevated, abstracted temple colonnade. The building's reinforced concrete skeleton frame is clad in terracotta plates, with Art Deco accents of patterned terracotta, metal moldings, and glass.

The abstracted Neoclassical features seen upon this building are characteristic of many federal buildings constructed in the 1930s. The courthouse is distinguished by its location on the eastern third of a large parcel that slopes down the hill twenty-four feet toward Fifth Avenue, facing Elliott Bay in the distance. As originally constructed, the landscape surrounding the building is an integral part of the building's design. An axial, centered walkway, flanked by polished granite planters and cheek blocks, leads to three centered entries and reiterates the building's formality. The large landscaped area between the front elevation and Fifth Avenue consists of lawn and symmetrically placed groupings of hedges and large oak trees. This green space is among the largest in downtown Seattle and has become a popular public gathering place.

Exterior ornamentation occurs primarily on the first three stories, which form a broad pedestal. The main body of the building steps back from the pedestal base, rises seven more stories, and is capped by a recessed, two-story penthouse. On the principal facades, west and east, the pedestal and main building mass is broken up into a series of solid bays with vertical bands of recessed glass and decorated cast metal spandrel panels in the upper stories, creating a pronounced feeling of verticality. Three entrance doors are recessed into the first-story portions of both west and east elevations. The north and south elevations complement the west and east, with one centrally located continuous vertical window bay.

In contrast to the relatively restrained exterior design, the public interior spaces are distinguished by exuberantly colored tile and other ornamentation, such as Art Deco aluminum radiator covers and pyramid-shaped light fixtures. Each floor of the building is accessed through a public elevator lobby. On the first two floors, the walls are surfaced with salmon, turquoise, and mustard terracotta panels and the floors are highly polished starburst-patterned terrazzo in shades of brown and beige. The ceilings are accented with stepped coffers. The courthouse features five courtrooms with fifteen-foot windows, engaged columns of walnut in the Doric order, aluminum stars and wheat staff ornamentation.

The interior of the building was renovated in 1983–1984, when the original steel windows were replaced. The public elevator lobbies and major courtrooms retain their original finishes and locations, although interior corridors and office spaces are altered. In 1985, GSA's Art in Architecture program commissioned two oil-on-canvas paintings titled The Effects of Good and Bad Government from artist Caleb Ives Bach. Originally located in the lobby, the paintings were conserved in 2008 and reinstalled in the law library.

From 2006 to 2009, the building underwent an extensive renovation project. A new secured underground facility was added and the building was upgraded to meet current seismic standards. The renovation received LEED certification for design, energy efficient building systems, reuse and recycling of existing materials and other measures.

A fictional version of the courthouse is featured in the 2020 video game The Last of Us Part II.

== Timeline ==
- 1936: Congress approves $1.7 million for site acquisition and construction
- 1938-1940: Building design and construction
- 1980: Building and site listed in National Register of Historic Places
- 1983-1984: Structural and interior improvements are made and windows replaced
- 1985: The Effects of Good and Bad Government by artist Caleb Ives Bach installed
- 2001: Building renamed to honor Medal of Honor recipient William Kenzo Nakamura
- 2006-2009: LEED-certified building renovation, modernization, and seismic upgrade project
