= William James Lindberg =

American judge

Senior Judge of the United States District Court for the Western District of Washington
- In office March 1, 1971 – December 15, 1981

Chief Judge of the United States District Court for the Western District of Washington
- In office 1959–1971
- Preceded by: John Clyde Bowen
- Succeeded by: George Hugo Boldt

Judge of the United States District Court for the Eastern District of Washington
- In office April 25, 1951 – May 19, 1961
- Appointed by: Harry S. Truman
- Preceded by: Lloyd Llewellyn Black
- Succeeded by: Seat abolished

Judge of the United States District Court for the Western District of Washington
- In office April 25, 1951 – March 1, 1971
- Appointed by: Harry S. Truman
- Preceded by: Lloyd Llewellyn Black
- Succeeded by: Walter T. McGovern

Personal details
- Born: William James Lindberg; December 17, 1904 Minot, North Dakota
- Died: December 15, 1981 (aged 76)
- Education: Gonzaga University School of Law (LL.B.); Georgetown Law (LL.M.)

William James Lindberg (December 17, 1904 – December 15, 1981) was a United States district judge of the United States District Court for the Eastern District of Washington and the United States District Court for the Western District of Washington.

== Education and career ==
Born in Minot, North Dakota, Lindberg received a Bachelor of Laws from Gonzaga University School of Law in 1927 and a Master of Laws from Georgetown Law in 1928. He was a clerk for United States Senator Clarence Dill in 1928. He was in private practice in Spokane, Washington from 1928 to 1933. He was a professor of law at Gonzaga University School of Law from 1928 to 1933. He was Secretary for the Washington State Senate in 1933. He was an assistant state attorney general of Washington from 1933 to 1934. He was a member of the Washington State Liquor Control Board from 1934 to 1941. He was in private practice in Olympia, Washington from 1941 to 1944. He was in private practice in Seattle, Washington from 1944 to 1951.

== Federal judicial service ==
Lindberg was nominated by President Harry S. Truman on March 12, 1951, to a joint seat on the United States District Court for the Eastern District of Washington and the United States District Court for the Western District of Washington vacated by Judge Lloyd Llewellyn Black. He was confirmed by the United States Senate on April 24, 1951, and received his commission on April 25, 1951. He served as Chief Judge of the Western District from 1959 to 1971. He was a member of the Judicial Conference of the United States from 1960 to 1963. On May 19, 1961, he was reassigned by operation of law to serve in the Western District only. He assumed senior status on March 1, 1971. Lindberg served in that capacity until his death on December 15, 1981.

== Sources ==
Legal offices
Preceded by Lloyd Llewellyn Black	Judge of the United States District Court for the Eastern District of Washington; 1951–1961	Succeeded by Seat abolished
Preceded by Lloyd Llewellyn Black	Judge of the United States District Court for the Western District of Washington; 1951–1971	Succeeded by Walter T. McGovern
Preceded by John Clyde Bowen	Chief Judge of the United States District Court for the Western District of Washington; 1959–1971	Succeeded by George Hugo Boldt
