= Stanley Bastian =

American judge (born 1958)

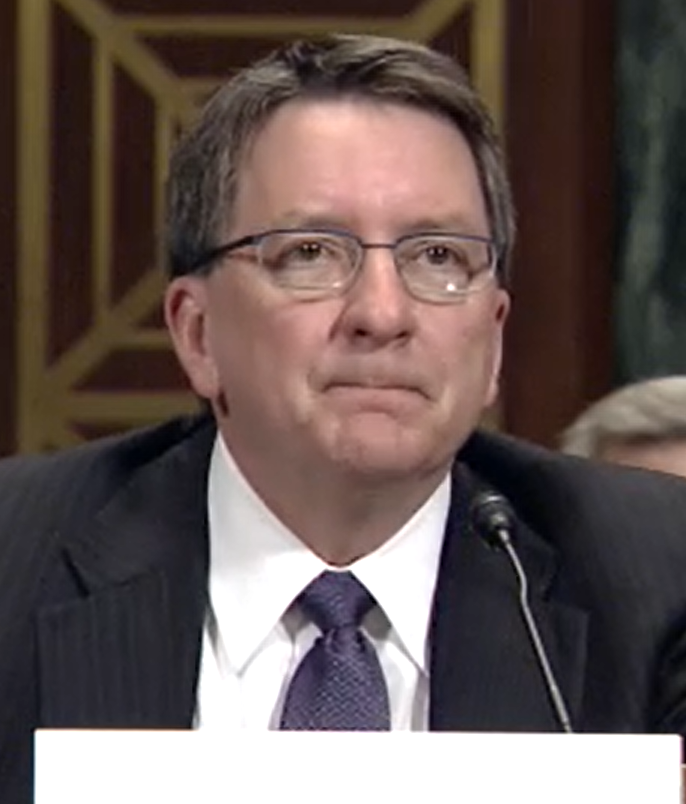

Chief Judge of the United States District Court for the Eastern District of Washington
- Incumbent
- Assumed office July 27, 2020
- Preceded by: Thomas O. Rice

Judge of the United States District Court for the Eastern District of Washington
- Incumbent
- Assumed office May 1, 2014
- Appointed by: Barack Obama
- Preceded by: Edward F. Shea

Personal details
- Born: Stanley Allen Bastian; April 3, 1958 (age 67) Seattle, Washington, U.S.
- Education: University of Oregon (BS); University of Washington (JD)

Stanley Allen Bastian (born April 3, 1958) is an American attorney and jurist serving as chief United States district judge of the United States District Court for the Eastern District of Washington.

== Early life and education ==
Bastian was born in Seattle, Washington on April 3, 1958. He received a Bachelor of Science degree in 1980 from the University of Oregon and a Juris Doctor from the University of Washington School of Law in 1983.

== Career ==
After graduating from law school, he worked as an associate at the law firm of Bergman & Bauer from 1983 to 1984. He served as a law clerk to Judge Ward Williams of the Washington State Court of Appeals from 1984 to 1985 and as an Assistant City Attorney in Seattle, from 1985 to 1988. In 1988, he joined the law firm of Jeffers, Danielson, Sonn & Aylward, P.S. in Wenatchee, Washington, where he primarily handled civil employment cases. From 2012 to 2014, he was the managing partner of the law firm. He also served as the president of the Washington State Bar Association in 2007. Bastian was selected as a fellow of the American College of Trial Lawyers in 2007, and chaired the Equal Justice Coalition from 2010 to 2013. Over the course of his career Bastian tried hundreds of cases before juries and judges.

=== Federal judicial service ===
On September 19, 2013, President Barack Obama nominated Bastian to serve as a United States district judge of the United States District Court for the Eastern District of Washington, to the seat vacated by Judge Edward F. Shea, who assumed senior status on June 7, 2012. The American Bar Association's committee on federal judicial recommendations unanimously rated Bastian as well-qualified for the position. On January 16, 2014, his nomination was reported out of committee. On April 11, 2014, Senate Majority Leader Harry Reid filed a motion to invoke cloture on the nomination. On April 29, 2014, the United States Senate invoked cloture on his nomination by a 55–41 vote. On April 30, 2014, his nomination was confirmed by a 95–0 vote. He received his judicial commission on May 1, 2014. He became chief judge on July 27, 2020.

On September 17, 2020, Bastian issued a nationwide preliminary injunction against the United States Postal Service to reverse changes that had occurred in early July that had slowed down mail delivery and removed sorting machines. Bastian called it a "politically-motivated attack on the efficiency of the postal service".

Legal offices
Preceded by Edward F. Shea	Judge of the United States District Court for the Eastern District of Washington; 2014–present	Incumbent
Preceded by Thomas O. Rice	Chief Judge of the United States District Court for the Eastern District of Washington; 2020–present	Incumbent
