= United States District Court for the Eastern District of Washington =

United States federal district court in Washington (U.S. state)

Coordinates: 47°39′31″N 117°25′33.6″W

- (E.D. Wash.)
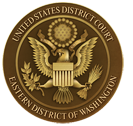

- Map of the court's jurisdiction by county
- Location: Thomas S. Foley Courthouse (Spokane) More locations: William O. Douglas Federal Building (Yakima); Federal Building (Richland)
- Appeals to: Ninth Circuit
- Established: March 2, 1905
- Judges: 4
- Chief Judge: Stanley Bastian

Officers of the court
- U.S. Attorney: Pete Serrano (special attorney)
- U.S. Marshal: Craig Thayer
- www.waed.uscourts.gov

The United States District Court for the Eastern District of Washington (in case citations, E.D. Wash.) is the federal district court whose jurisdiction comprises the following counties of the state of Washington: Adams, Asotin, Benton, Chelan, Columbia, Douglas, Ferry, Franklin, Garfield, Grant, Kittitas, Klickitat, Lincoln, Okanogan, Pend Oreille, Spokane, Stevens, Walla Walla, Whitman, and Yakima.

As of the 2000 United States census, 1.3 million people resided in the Eastern District, representing 22% of the state's population. The district includes the cities of Richland, Spokane, and Yakima, among others. The Federal Court in Yakima is located in the William O. Douglas Federal Building.

Cases from the Eastern District of Washington are appealed to the United States Court of Appeals for the Ninth Circuit, except for patent claims and claims against the U.S. government under the Tucker Act, which are appealed to the Federal Circuit.

The United States Attorney's Office for the Eastern District of Washington represents the United States in civil and criminal litigation in the court.

Pete Serrano was appointed interim United States attorney on August 11, 2025. The interim term expired on December 11, at which point he continued in the same leadership role under a new title, First Assistant and Special Attorney to the Attorney General of the United States for the Eastern District of Washington.

== Current judges ==
As of December 9, 2024:

#	Title	Judge	Duty station	Born	Term of service			Appointed by
#	Title	Judge	Duty station	Born	Active	Chief	Senior	Appointed by
22	Chief Judge	Stanley Bastian	Yakima	1958	2014–present	2020–present	—	Obama
21	District Judge	Thomas O. Rice	Spokane	1960	2012–present	2016–2020	—	Obama
24	District Judge	Mary Dimke	Richland	1977	2021–present	—	—	Biden
25	District Judge	Rebecca L. Pennell	Spokane	1971	2024–present	—	—	Biden
15	Senior Judge	William Nielsen	inactive	1934	1991–2003	1995–2000	2003–present	G.H.W. Bush
17	Senior Judge	Robert H. Whaley	Spokane	1943	1995–2009	2005–2009	2009–present	Clinton
18	Senior Judge	Edward F. Shea	Richland	1942	1998–2012	—	2012–present	Clinton
19	Senior Judge	Lonny R. Suko	Yakima	1943	2003–2013	2009–2011	2013–present	G.W. Bush
20	Senior Judge	Rosanna M. Peterson	inactive	1951	2010–2021	2011–2016	2021–present	Obama

== Vacancies and pending nominations ==
Seat	Prior judge's duty station	Seat last held by	Vacancy reason	Date of vacancy	Nominee	Date of nomination
1	Spokane	Thomas O. Rice	Retirement	December 15, 2026	–	–

== Former judges ==
#	Judge	Born–died	Active service	Chief Judge	Senior status	Appointed by	Reason for termination
1	Edward Whitson	1852–1910	1905–1910	—	—	T. Roosevelt	death
2	Frank H. Rudkin	1864–1931	1911–1923	—	—	Taft	elevation
3	J. Stanley Webster	1877–1962	1923–1939 (Note: Recess appointment; formally nominated on December 15, 1923, confirmed by the United States Senate on January 16, 1924, and received commission the same day.)	—	1939–1962	Harding (Note: Initially appointed via recess appointment by Harding; formally nominated by and received commission from Coolidge.)	death
4	Lloyd Llewellyn Black	1889–1950	1940–1950 (Note: Black was initially appointed to the Western District of Washington in 1939; he was reassigned by operation of law to serve in both districts.)	—	—	F. Roosevelt/Operation of law	death
5	Lewis B. Schwellenbach	1894–1948	1940–1945	—	—	F. Roosevelt	resignation
6	Samuel Marion Driver	1892–1958	1946–1958	1948–1958	—	Truman	death
7	William James Lindberg	1904–1981	1951–1961 (Note: Jointly appointed to the Eastern and Western Districts of Washington.)	—	—	Truman	reassignment
8	Charles Lawrence Powell	1902–1975	1959–1972	1959–1972	1972–1975	Eisenhower	death
9	William Nelson Goodwin	1909–1975	1966–1975	1972–1973	—	L. Johnson	death
10	Marshall Allen Neill	1914–1979	1972–1979	1973–1979	—	Nixon	death
11	Jack Edward Tanner	1919–2006	1978	—	—	Carter	reassignment
12	Robert James McNichols	1922–1992	1979–1991	1980–1989	1991–1992	Carter	death
13	Justin L. Quackenbush	1929–2024	1980–1995	1989–1995	1995–2024	Carter	death
14	Alan Angus McDonald	1927–2007	1985–1996	—	1996–2007	Reagan	death
16	Frederick L. Van Sickle	1943–2021	1991–2008	2000–2005	2008–2021	G.H.W. Bush	death
23	Salvador Mendoza Jr.	1971–present	2014–2022	—	—	Obama	elevation

== Chief judges ==
Chief judges have administrative responsibilities with respect to their district court. Unlike the Supreme Court, where one justice is specifically nominated to be chief, the office of chief judge rotates among the district court judges. To be chief, a judge must have been in active service on the court for at least one year, be under the age of 65, and have not previously served as chief judge.

A vacancy is filled by the judge highest in seniority among the group of qualified judges. The chief judge serves for a term of seven years, or until age 70, whichever occurs first. The age restrictions are waived if no members of the court would otherwise be qualified for the position.

When the office was created in 1948, the chief judge was the longest-serving judge who had not elected to retire, on what has since 1958 been known as senior status, or declined to serve as chief judge. After August 6, 1959, judges could not become or remain chief after turning 70 years old. The current rules have been in operation since October 1, 1982.

== Succession of seats ==
Seat 1
Seat established on March 2, 1905 by 33 Stat. 824
Whitson	1905–1910
Rudkin	1911–1923
Webster	1924–1939
Schwellenbach	1940–1945
Driver	1946–1958
Powell	1959–1972
Neill	1972–1979
Quackenbush	1980–1995
Whaley	1995–2009
Rice	2012–present

Seat 2
Seat assigned on January 20, 1940 by 54 Stat. 16 (concurrent with Western District)
Black	1940–1950
Lindberg	1951–1961
Seat reassigned solely to Western District on May 19, 1961 by 75 Stat. 80

Seat 3
Seat established on May 19, 1961 by 75 Stat. 80 (concurrent with Western District)
Goodwin	1966–1975
Tanner	1978
Seat reassigned solely to Western District on October 20, 1978 by 92 Stat. 1629

Seat 4
Seat established on October 20, 1978 by 92 Stat. 1629
McNichols	1979–1991
Nielsen	1991–2003
Suko	2003–2013
Mendoza Jr.	2014–2022
Pennell	2024–present

Seat 5
Seat established on July 10, 1984 by 98 Stat. 333
McDonald	1985–1996
Shea	1998–2012
Bastian	2014–present

Seat 6
Seat established on December 1, 1990 by 104 Stat. 5089
Van Sickle	1991–2008
Peterson	2010–2021
Dimke	2021–present

== See also ==
- Courts of Washington
- List of current United States district judges
- List of United States federal courthouses in Washington
