= Gonzaga University School of Law =

Law school in Spokane, Washington, US

- Motto: For God and country through sciences and arts
- Parent school: Gonzaga University
- Established: 1912; 114 years ago
- School type: Private
- Dean: Jacob H. Rooksby
- Location: Spokane, Washington, U.S. 47.6633°N 117.4008°W
- Enrollment: ~336
- Faculty: 117 (full- and part-time)
- USNWR ranking: 99th (2024)
- Bar pass rate: 96.58%
- Website: www.gonzaga.edu/school-of-law
- ABA profile: Gonzaga Law Profile

Location in the continental United States
Location in Washington

The Gonzaga University School of Law (also known as Gonzaga Law or GU Law) is the professional school for the study of law at Gonzaga University. Established in 1912, the Jesuit-affiliated law school has been fully accredited by the American Bar Association since 1951, and is a member of the Association of American Law Schools.

Situated on the southern edge of Gonzaga University's campus, the Gonzaga University School of Law building includes the Chastek Law Library, University Legal Assistance, and the Barbieri Courtroom. The school awards a Juris Doctor (J.D.) degree and an Accelerated Two-Year J.D. It also offers dual degrees—including the Juris Doctor and Master of Business Administration (J.D./MBA), the Juris Doctor and Master of Accountancy (J.D./M.Acc.), the Juris Doctor and Master of Science in Taxation (J.D./M.S.Tax) and the Juris Doctor and Master of Social Work (J.D./M.S.W.) The school's location in Spokane, Washington, the largest city in the Inland Northwest, allows students to take advantage of internships with private firms, government and not-for-profit agencies, and opportunities with both federal and state courts. Spokane is home to the United States District Court for the Eastern District of Washington within the appellate jurisdiction of the United States Court of Appeals for the Ninth Circuit. Alumni of the school practice in all 50 U.S. states, as well as various associated states and foreign countries.

== Campus & history ==
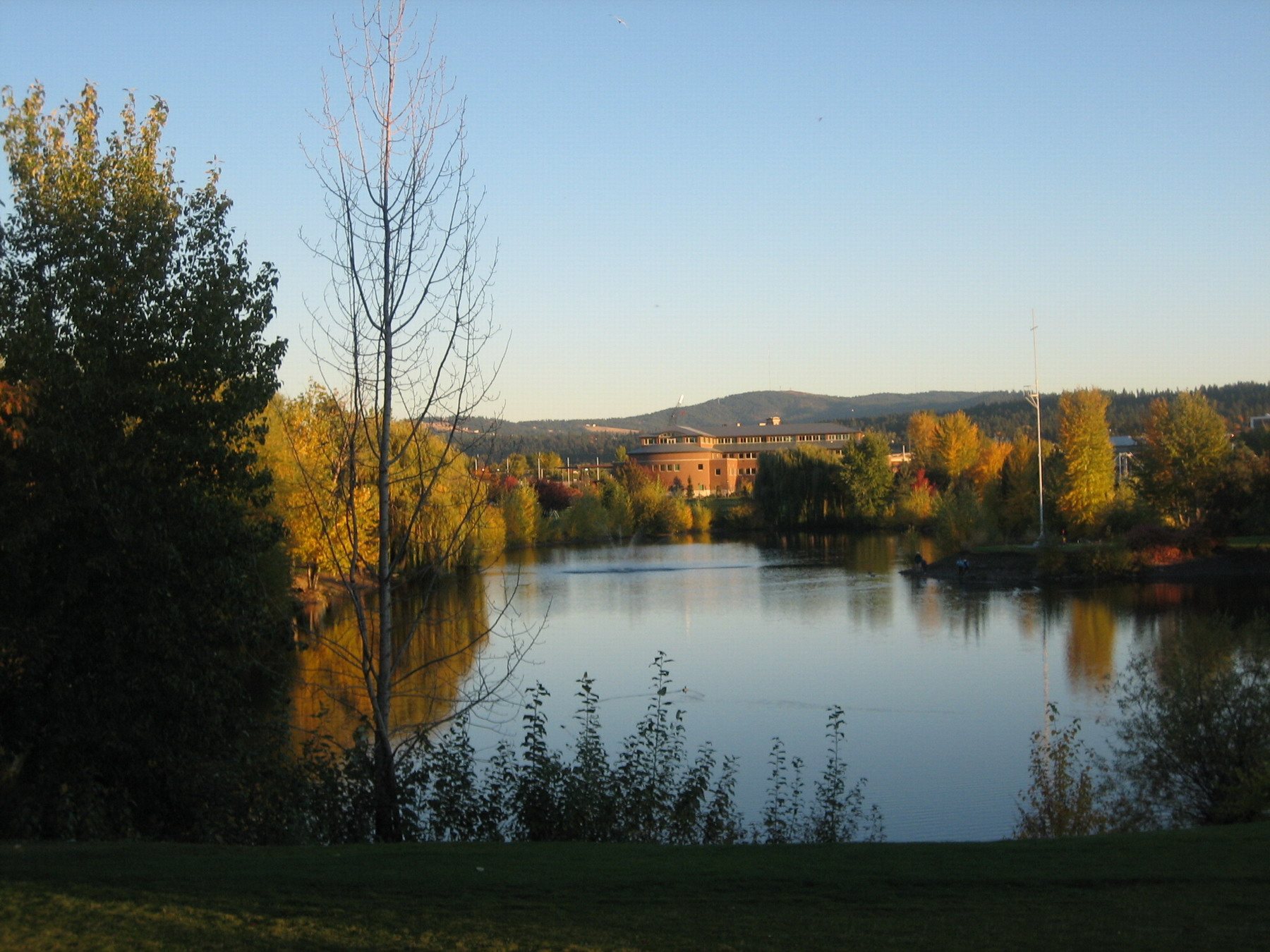
Lake Arthur and Gonzaga University School of Law in October

Gonzaga University was established in 1887 as a private, Jesuit institution. By 1912, the leadership of the university opened a law school program. Founded on the motto "A First Class Law School, or None at All," Gonzaga University School of Law opened its doors on October 1, 1912. Two classrooms on the third floor of the Administration Building were provided for the law school. The school's first dean was Edward J. Cannon. In June 1915, Gonzaga University School of Law graduated its first law class of 13 students.

During the first half of the 20th century, the law school continued to expand its enrollment and curriculum, and by the 1960s, the school had outgrown its facilities. Gonzaga University President Father John Leary, S.J., acquired a nearby vacant grade school in July 1962 for the law school. The former Webster School was originally built in 1901, was the victim of a fire in 1945, and was subsequently restored as a trade school. The former Webster School would house the law school for the next thirty-eight years.

In the 1970s, the law school experienced explosive growth, and its building underwent several renovations. In 1974, it opened one of the country's first legal clinics. By the 1990s, the law school occupied the old Webster school along with several adjacent buildings. Under Dean John Clute, fundraising was begun to build a new law school building. The class of 2000 was the last to graduate from the old law building. In late May 2000, the new Gonzaga University School of Law building, located on the banks of the Spokane River, opened its doors. The new building is 104,000 square feet (9,700 m^{2}), and was completed at a cost of $18.5 million.

The law school houses the Barbieri Courtroom, which has been used on multiple occasions by both the Washington Supreme Court and the U.S. Court of Appeals for the Ninth Circuit to hear oral arguments. It also houses the large Chastek Law Library, which houses more than 380,000 volumes and is part of the Federal Depository Library Program. In 2012, the law school celebrated its centennial.

== Admissions ==
In 2019, the school enrolled 140 students in the 1L class (first-year students). The median GPA was 3.41 and the median LSAT score was 154.

Underrepresented ethnic minorities comprised 16 percent of the 1L class. In 2017, The National Jurist magazine's pre-law magazine named GU Law the #3 Top School for Latter-day Saint students and the #6 Most Devout Catholic Law School. GU Law consistently ranks within the top five schools for Latter-day Saint students and the top ten schools for devout Catholic students. It is also a Law School Admission Council (LSAC) Diversity Matters: Top 10 school.

== Ranking and honors ==
U.S. News & World Report ranked Gonzaga University School of Law:

- #56 (Survey of Highly Regarded American Law Firms) (2012)
- #99 overall (2024)

The National Jurist ranked Gonzaga University School of Law:

- 'A' Best Law School Buildings (2018)
- 'B+' Top 37 Law Schools for Practical Training (2018, 2016)
- 'B+' Top 40 Law Schools for Small Law (2015)
- #3 Top School of Latter-day Saints (2017, 2013)
- #6 Most Devout School for Catholics (2017)

Recent editions of The Princeton Review ranked Gonzaga University School of Law:

- "Best 169 Law Schools" (2018) (The list does not provide a final comprehensive ranking of schools overall.)

Moody's Employment Rankings ranked Gonzaga University School of Law:

- #63 (2014)

Gonzaga Law has also received national recognition as supporting one of the most innovative law school curricula in the U.S. The school was one of ten schools awarded a Diversity Matters Award from the Law School Admissions Council for its diversity outreach efforts in 2013.

== Degree programs ==
=== Juris Doctor (JD) program ===
Most of the students at Gonzaga University School of Law are enrolled in the Juris Doctor (JD) program. JD students are required to take 90 semester hours of credit in order to graduate. The traditional JD program includes two years of legal research and writing classes, although students are allowed to choose between three capstone writing courses (Advanced Advocacy, Drafting for Litigation, and Transactional Drafting). Doctrinal classes include Civil Procedure, Contracts, Property, Torts, Criminal Law, Constitutional Law, Evidence, and Professional Responsibility. Students are also expected to take two Skills and Professionalism Labs, one using rules of Civil Procedure and Torts to teach practical litigation skills and another using Contracts and Property to teach practical transactional skills. All third-year students earn at least six credits in either the school's clinic or its externship program. In addition to their substantive coursework, many second and third-year students participate in moot court, a scholarly publication, a clinic, or an externship. The school does not offer a part-time program, although students with approval may take a reduced credit load for good cause, or based on extraordinary circumstances. Students with an international undergraduate degree in law may be eligible to transfer some of their credits and complete a J.D. degree in two years or less.

=== Accelerated Juris Doctor program ===
Gonzaga University School of Law also offers a Two-Year Accelerated Juris Doctor program designed for students who are self-motivated, diligent, and industrious. Accelerated JD students are still required to take 90 semester hours of credit in order to graduate but may do so in twenty-four calendar months—taking full loads during summers.

=== Fast-Track Juris Doctor/undergraduate degree 3+3 program ===
Eastern Washington University students of all majors who maintain a grade-point average of 3.3 or higher, may apply during their junior year for acceptance to Gonzaga University School of Law's 3+3 program. If accepted, students may obtain their bachelor's degree and law degrees in six years rather than the usual seven (first-year law courses would count toward remaining requirements of undergraduate degrees). The program is also available for students transferring from Whitworth University's political science department.

=== Joint degree programs ===
For students interested in a more general interdisciplinary course of study, the School of Law offers four joint degree programs (usually completed in four years, as opposed to three for a standard JD):

JD-MBA, with Gonzaga University School of Business
JD-M.Acc., with Gonzaga University School of Business
JD-M.S.Tax, with Gonzaga University School of Business
JD-MSW, with Eastern Washington University's School of Social Work (located across the Spokane River at Riverpoint Campus)

In 2019, Eastern Washington University and Gonzaga University School of Law announced the EWU-GU Legal Education Collaboration Committee to identify and explore the creation of potential legal education programs to enhance EWU student opportunities to access GU Law programs and services, including exploration of the possibility of establishing JD-MPH and a JD-MPA programs.

== Bar passage rates ==
The American Bar Association's 2018 Bar Passage Outcomes Report found that 96.58% of 2015 graduates had passed a bar exam within two years of graduation (placing the school in the top 30 schools out of 213 nationally). Graduates averaged a passage rate of between 75 and 100% on the Washington Bar Exam (a Uniform Bar Examination) over recent years, consistently performing above the state average on the Washington Bar Exam. In February 2016, 100% of Gonzaga Law students taking the Washington bar exam for the first time passed. The ABA found that 91% of 2017 graduates ultimately passed the bar exam.

== Post-graduation employment ==
According to Gonzaga Law's official 2016 ABA-required disclosures, 69% of the Class of 2016 obtained full-time, long-term, bar passage-required employment nine months after graduation, excluding solo-practitioners. Total employment for the Class of 2016 was 89.8% while 5.4% were pursuing graduate degrees and 10% were unemployed nine months graduation.

GU Law's Law School Transparency under-employment score is 22.2%, indicating the percentage of the Class of 2015 unemployed, pursuing an additional degree, or working in a non-professional, short-term, or part-time job nine months after graduation.

== Costs ==
The total cost of yearly attendance (indicating the cost of tuition, fees, and living expenses) at Gonzaga Law is estimated as $53,287.

The Law School Transparency estimated debt-financed cost of attendance for three years is $202,601.

== Clinical program ==
The law school includes the Gonzaga Center for Law and Justice, a not-for-profit University Legal Assistance clinical program. Clinic students represent clients who are residents of the Spokane area, require legal representation, and who are without the means to hire a traditional lawyer. The structure of the Clinic is modeled after a large law firm, and the Clinic specializes in family law, elder law, immigration law, civil rights, disability rights, and criminal defense. Students control their own case loads, and represent clients in court under the supervision of law school faculty, and with limited licenses to practice law. Students work 42.5 billable hours for each clinic credit hour.

The clinical programs available include:

- Business Law Clinic
- Catholic Charities Immigration Clinic
- Elder Law Clinic
- Environmental Law & Land Use Clinic
- Federal Indian Law Clinic
- Federal Tax Clinic
- General Practice Clinic
- Mortgage Foreclosure Clinic
- Lincoln LGBTQ+ Rights Clinic

== Centers and institutes ==
- Beatriz and Ed Schweitzer Border Justice Initiative
- Task Force on Race and the Criminal Justice System
- Commercial Law Center
- Institute for Law Teaching and Learning
- Center for Law in Public Service
- Center for Civil and Human Rights

== Journals ==
The law school currently publishes two legal journals. Student staff members are selected based on a writing competition, editing competition, and first-year grades, or a publishable note or comment on a legal topic.

- Gonzaga Law Review
- Gonzaga Journal of International Law

The Washington & Lee University Impact Factor Ranking places the GU Law Review within its top 100 law journals.

== William O. Douglas Lecture Series ==
The law school hosts an annual lecture series for the purpose of promoting a strong commitment to the freedoms of speech, religion, and assembly protected by the First Amendment to the United States Constitution. The lecture series features distinguished individuals who share this strong commitment to the First Amendment. Guest speakers have included a variety of prominent jurists and participants in First Amendment related cases, including U.S. Supreme Court Justices William O. Douglas (1972, inaugural speaker), William H. Rehnquist (1976), Byron R. White (1982), Arthur Goldberg (1983), Antonin Scalia (1994), and landmark case petitioner John Tinker (2019).

== Notable people ==
=== Faculty ===
==== Full-time and adjunct faculty ====
- Steven González (2017–present), Washington Supreme Court chief justice, constitutional law scholar
- Jane B. Korn (2011–present) former dean, employment discrimination legal scholar

==== Former faculty ====
- Thomas S. Foley (1958–1959), speaker of the House, U.S. ambassador
- Francis Arthur Garrecht (1914–1921), U.S. circuit judge
- Earl F. Martin (2005–2010), president of Drake University
- Rosanna M. Peterson (1999–2010), U.S. district judge
- Jacob H. Rooksby (2018–2026), dean of University of Richmond School of Law
- Lewis B. Schwellenbach (1944–1945), secretary of labor, U.S. senator, U.S. district judge
- Debra L. Stephens, Washington Supreme Court associate justice
- J. Stanley Webster (1912–1915), Washington Supreme Court associate justice, U.S. congressman, U.S. district judge

=== Alumni ===
The law school's alumni actively practice in all 50 states in the nation and include U.S. judges, a U.S. senator, former U.S. congressmen, and current and former U.S. attorneys. Alumni also include four sitting state supreme court justices, a former governor of Washington, state attorneys general in several states, CEOs of multi-million dollar companies, and a NASCAR champion.
