= List of University of Washington School of Law alumni =

The University of Washington School of Law is a public law school in Seattle, Washington. Following are some of its notable alumni.

== Academia ==
- Vern Countryman (1942): professor at Yale Law School; dean of the University of New Mexico School of Law, and professor at Harvard Law School
- Joseph L. Hoffmann (1984): professor at Indiana University Mauer School of Law
- Shon Hopwood (2014): bank robber turned jailhouse lawyer, D.C. Circuit law clerk, and law professor at Georgetown University Law Center
- Lucas A. Powe Jr. (1968): professor at The University of Texas School of Law

== Business ==
- Jeffrey H. Brotman (1967): co-founder of the Costco Wholesale Corporation
- Bill Foley (1974): businessman and owner of the Vegas Golden Knights

== Judiciary ==
=== Federal ===
- Stanley Bastian (1983): U.S. District Court judge for the Eastern District of Washington
- William T. Beeks (1932): judge of the U.S. District Court judge for the Western District of Washington
- Lloyd Llewellyn Black (1912): U.S. District Court judge for the Western District and then the Eastern District of Washington
- Robert Jensen Bryan (1958): judge of the U.S. District Court for the Western District of Washington
- Donald R. Colvin (1945): law clerk to William O. Douglas
- Carolyn R. Dimmick (1953): U.S. District Court judge for the Western District of Washington; first woman on the Washington Supreme Court
- Samuel M. Driver (1916): chief judge, U.S. District Court for the Eastern District of Washington
- David Estudillo (1999): U.S. District Court judge for the Western District of Washington
- Joseph Jerome Farris (1958): judge on the U.S. Court of Appeals for the Ninth Circuit
- Betty Fletcher (1956): judge on the U.S. Court of Appeals for the Ninth Circuit
- Frederick G. Hamley (1932): judge on the United States Court of Appeals for the Ninth Circuit and Washington Supreme Court justice
- Marco A. Hernandez (1986): U.S. District Court judge for the District of Oregon
- Walter H. Hodge (1919): judge of the United States District Court for the District of Alaska
- Richard A. Jones (1975): U.S. District Court judge for the Western District of Washington
- Montgomery O. Koelsch (1935): judge of the U.S. Court of Appeals for the Ninth Circuit
- Robert Lasnik (1978): chief judge, U.S. District Court for the Western District of Washington
- Lucile Lomen (1944): first woman to serve as a law clerk for a U.S. Supreme Court justice
- Ricardo S. Martinez (1980): U.S. District Court judge for the Western District of Washington
- Alan A. McDonald (1952): U.S. District Court judge for the Eastern District of Washington
- Walter T. McGovern (1950): U.S. District Court judge for the Western District of Washington
- William Fremming Nielsen (1962): U.S. District Court judge for the Eastern District of Washington
- Jill Otake (1998): U.S. District Court judge for the District of Hawaii
- Charles L. Powell (1925): U.S. District Court judge for the Eastern District of Washington
- Stanley C. Soderland (1939): Supreme Court clerk to William O. Douglas; King County Superior Court judge
- Jack E. Tanner (1955): U.S. District Court judge for the Eastern District and Western District of Washington
- Eugene A. Wright (1937): judge of the U.S. Court of Appeals for the Ninth Circuit

=== State courts ===
- Don G. Abel (1919): Washington Supreme Court justice
- Gerry L. Alexander (1964): Washington Supreme Court chief justice
- James A. Andersen (1951): Washington Supreme Court chief justice
- Walter B. Beals (1901): Washington Supreme Court justice
- Bobbe Bridge (1976): Washington Supreme Court justice
- Tom Chambers (1969): Washington Supreme Court justice
- James M. Dolliver (1952): Washington Supreme Court chief justice
- Walter M. French (1901): Washington Supreme Court justice
- William C. Goodloe (1948): Washington Supreme Court chief justice
- Frederick G. Hamley (1932): Washington Supreme Court justice and judge on the United States Court of Appeals for the Ninth Circuit
- Matthew W. Hill (1917): Washington Supreme Court justice
- James M. Johnson (1970): Washington Supreme Court justice
- Joseph A. Mallery (1926): Washington Supreme Court Justice
- Colleen Melody (2009): Washington Supreme Court justice
- Raquel Montoya-Lewis (1995): Washington Supreme Court justice
- Hugh J. Rosellini (1933): chief justice of the Washington Supreme Court
- Richard B. Sanders (1969): Washington Supreme Court justice
- Charles Z. Smith (1955): Washington State Supreme Court justice and the state's first African American justice

=== Local courts ===
- Othilia Carroll Beals (1901): justice of the peace in Seattle during World War I

== Law ==
=== Government ===
- Jenny Durkan (1985): U.S. attorney for the Western District of Washington; first openly gay U.S. attorney; former mayor of Seattle
- Wing Luke: Washington state assistant attorney general and first Asian American to hold elected office in Washington
- Norm Maleng (1966): longtime King County prosecuting attorney
- Mark Sidran (1976): former Seattle city attorney

=== Private practice ===
- Vivian Carkeek (1901): noted Seattle attorney
- William H. Gates, Sr. (1950): co-founder of law firm Preston Gates & Ellis (now K&L Gates) and father of Microsoft founder Bill Gates

== Politics ==
- Emily Alvarado (2025): member of the Washington State Senate, previously member of the Washington House of Representatives
- Rod Dembowski (2001): member, King County Council District 1
- Norm Dicks (1968): U.S. representative
- Jenny Durkan (1985): former mayor of Seattle and U.S. attorney for the Western District of Washington; first openly gay U.S. attorney
- Tom Foley (1957): speaker of the U.S. House of Representatives and U.S. ambassador to Japan
- Bruce Harrell (1984): mayor of Seattle
- Floyd Hicks (1948): U.S. representative
- Henry M. Jackson (1935): U.S. senator
- Raúl Labrador (1995): U.S. representative, 32nd attorney general of Idaho
- Arthur B. Langlie (1925): governor of Washington
- Stan Lippmann (1998): perennial candidate and anti-vaccination activist
- Warren Magnuson (1929): U.S. senator
- August P. Mardesich (1948): member and majority leader of the Washington State House of Representatives
- Michael McGinn (1992): mayor of Seattle
- Dylan Orr (2009): first openly transgender person appointed to a U.S. presidential administration
- John E. Reilly Jr. (1928): member of the Wisconsin State Assembly and Milwaukee County judge
- Albert Rosellini (1933): governor of Washington
- Lewis B. Schwellenbach (1917): U.S. senator, U.S. District Court judge for the Eastern District of Washington, and U.S. secretary of labor
- Adam Smith (1990): U.S. representative
- Thor C. Tollefson (1930): U.S. representative
- Johnson Toribiong (J.D., 1972; LL.M, 1973): president of Palau
- Paul D. Wohlers (1982): U.S. ambassador to Macedonia
- Takuji Yamashita (1902): Japanese American civil rights activist
- Marion Zioncheck (1929): U.S. representative

== Religion ==
- Jack Tuell (1948): United Methodist Church bishop of Los Angeles 1980–1992
