= Morell Edward Sharp =

American judge

Judge of the United States District Court for the Western District of Washington
- In office December 9, 1971 – October 19, 1980
- Appointed by: Richard Nixon
- Preceded by: George Hugo Boldt
- Succeeded by: John C. Coughenour

Personal details
- Born: Morell Edward Sharp; September 12, 1920 Portland, Oregon
- Died: October 19, 1980 (aged 60)
- Education: Northwestern University Pritzker School of Law (J.D.)

Morell Edward Sharp (September 12, 1920 – October 19, 1980) was a United States district judge of the United States District Court for the Western District of Washington.

== Early life and career ==
Sharp was born on September 12, 1920, in Portland, Oregon. He graduated from the University of Oregon in 1942 with a Bachelors of Arts. Following the outbreak the World War II, he joined the U.S. Army and served in the Pacific theatre as a company commander and regimental adjutant before attaining the rank of captain. After the end of the war, he attended Northwestern University School of Law where he joined Phi Delta Phi and the student bar association, serving as a president and board member. He graduated from law school with a Bachelor of Laws in 1948.

After graduation, he worked as an attorney for the Milwaukee Railroad where he served for two years in Illinois before being sent to Seattle. He went into private practice in 1956, first joining the law firm of Williams, Kinnear, and Sharp before then joining Graham, Dunn, Johnston, and Rosenquist. Upon moving to Seattle, he also got involved in politics by joining and serving as the president of the Young Republicans' chapter in King County. He was also elected as one of the first councilmembers for Beaux Arts Village following its incorporation in 1954.

In 1967, Governor Daniel Evans, who first met Sharp through the Young Republicans when Sharp served as president, appointed him to a newly created seat on the King County Superior Court. During his time on the superior court bench, he served as chairman of the court's juvenile committee, a member of the executive committee for the King County Judges' Association, and a delegate to the National Conference of State Trial Judges. He also participated in the Washington Supreme Court's liaison committee for reforms to the judiciary section of the Washington State Constitution.

On May 28, 1970, Evans appointed Sharp to the Washington Supreme Court as a replacement for Justice Frank P. Weaver who had resigned. Although Evans initially intended to name James Dolliver, his administrative assistant, to the seat, he selected Sharp after receiving substantial opposition from the state bar association. His tenure on the court ended on January 11, 1971, after he was eliminated in a September primary election for the seat by Charles T. Wright, a superior court judge. His defeat by a margin of more than 12,000 votes came despite receiving support from the state and King County bar associations, a majority of his colleagues on the superior court bench, the Republican Party, and Evans. Sharp believed Judge Wright benefited from having the same last name as Eugene Wright, a popular judge from the King County Superior Court, although Sharp also had appeared to be a reluctant campaigner.

After leaving the bench, Sharp was appointed as a special consultant for the United States Attorney General through his connection to White House Counsel John Ehrlichman. Following a vacancy on the Washington Supreme Court when Justice Walter McGovern became a federal district court judge, Sharp rejoined the supreme court on May 13, 1971, after another appointment by Evans who said "he had no problems" with the selection. Sharp had accepted the reappointment as he "wanted to get back on the bench" and believed his previous electoral defeat was due to special circumstances, not a rejection by the voters.

== Federal judicial service ==
Sharp was nominated by President Richard Nixon on November 24, 1971, to a seat on the United States District Court for the Western District of Washington vacated by Judge George Hugo Boldt. He was confirmed by the United States Senate on December 2, 1971, and received his commission on December 9, 1971. Sharp served in that capacity until his death on October 19, 1980.

== Sources ==
Legal offices
Preceded by George Hugo Boldt	Judge of the United States District Court for the Western District of Washington; 1971–1980	Succeeded by John C. Coughenour
