= Trulock =

Trulock is a surname. Notable people with the surname include:

- John Trulock, British railwayman who worked in Galicia
- William Trulock Beeks (1906–1988), United States federal judge
- Camilo José María Manuel Juan Ramón Francisco Javier de Jerónimo Cela y Trulock, 1st Marquess of Iria Flavia (1916–2002), Spanish novelist, poet, story writer, and essayist
