= Keller Rohrback =

- Headquarters: Seattle, Washington
- No. of offices: 8
- No. of attorneys: 69
- Major practice areas: Class action lawsuits, securities
- Date founded: 1919
- Website: www.kellerrohrback.com

Keller Rohrback is an American plaintiffs' law firm. Founded in 1919, the firm is headquartered in Seattle, Washington, with additional offices in Portland, Denver, Oakland, New York, Phoenix, Missoula, and Santa Barbara.

Tana Lin was of counsel at Keller Rohrback when she was appointed by President Joe Biden as a United States district judge of the United States District Court for the Western District of Washington. While at the firm, Lin helped challenge former President Donald Trump's executive order placing restrictions on travel to the United States for citizens of Iran, Iraq, Libya, Somalia, Sudan, Syria, and Yemen.

Keller Rohrback was co-lead counsel in an antitrust case against makers of the epinephrine autoinjector. The firm, along with Robbins Geller Rudman & Dowd, received $115 million in fees from a $345 million settlement.
