= John H. Chun =

American federal judge (born 1970)

The Honorable John H. Chun
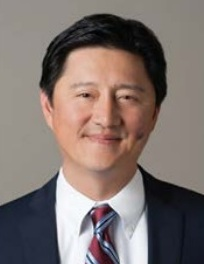

Judge of the United States District Court for the Western District of Washington
- Incumbent
- Assumed office March 30, 2022
- Nominated by: Joe Biden
- Preceded by: James Robart

Judge of the Washington Court of Appeals
- In office June 29, 2018 – March 30, 2022
- Appointed by: Jay Inslee
- Succeeded by: Ian Birk
- Constituency: Division I

Judge of the King County Superior Court
- In office February 2014 – June 29, 2018
- Appointed by: Jay Inslee
- Succeeded by: Averil Rothrock
- Constituency: Department 16

Personal details
- Born: John Hyungseung Chun; 1970 (age 55–56) Portland, Oregon, U.S.
- Education: Columbia University (BA); Cornell Law School (JD)

John Hyungseung Chun (born 1970) is an American lawyer and jurist serving as a United States district judge of the United States District Court for the Western District of Washington since 2022. He previously served as a judge on the Washington Court of Appeals, Division One, from 2018 to 2022, and on the King County Superior Court from 2014 to 2018. Chun is the first Asian American man to serve as a district judge on the Western District of Washington.

== Early life and education ==
Chun was born in 1970 in Portland, Oregon, to parents who immigrated from South Korea. He grew up in the Pacific Northwest and graduated from Catlin Gabel School, a private college-preparatory school in Portland.

Chun earned a Bachelor of Arts in English from Columbia University in 1991. He then attended Cornell Law School, where he served as a note editor and associate editor of the Cornell Law Review. While at Cornell, he authored a student note titled "The New Citadel: A Reasonably Designed Products Liability Restatement," which analyzed developments in products liability law and endorsed the risk-utility standard. He received his Juris Doctor in 1994, becoming the first member of his family to graduate from law school.

== Legal career ==
=== Judicial clerkship ===
After law school, Chun served as a law clerk to Judge Eugene A. Wright of the United States Court of Appeals for the Ninth Circuit from 1994 to 1995.

=== Private practice ===
Chun practiced law in Seattle, Washington, for nearly two decades, focusing on commercial and employment litigation. He worked at Mundt MacGregor from 1995 to 2005, first as an associate and then as a partner beginning in 2002. He then served as a partner at Preston Gates & Ellis (now K&L Gates) from 2005 to 2006, before joining Summit Law Group P.L.L.C. as a member from 2006 to 2013.

During his time in private practice, Chun represented clients in cases before the Washington Supreme Court and the Washington Court of Appeals. In Kamaya Co. v. American Property Consultants, Ltd. (1998), he successfully argued that certain contract claims should be arbitrated. He also argued before the Washington Supreme Court in Piel v. City of Federal Way (2013), defending the city against a wrongful termination claim, though the court ruled against the city 4–3.

From 2002 to 2005, Chun served as an adjunct professor at Seattle University School of Law. From 2004 to 2014, he served as a panel member for the American Arbitration Association on both the Commercial and Employment panels.

In 2003, while at Mundt MacGregor, Chun co-authored an amicus curiae brief to the U.S. Supreme Court on behalf of the King County Bar Association in Grutter v. Bollinger, supporting universities' use of race-conscious admissions policies.

== State judicial service ==
=== King County Superior Court ===
On December 13, 2013, Governor Jay Inslee appointed Chun to the King County Superior Court. He began serving in February 2014, handling civil, criminal, and family law matters. He won re-election unopposed in 2014 and 2016.

In a notable ruling, Chun rejected a challenge to Washington's charter school initiative, ruling that the lottery funding mechanism did not divert funds from public schools. His decision was affirmed by the Washington Supreme Court in El Centro de la Raza v. State (2018).

=== Washington Court of Appeals ===
On June 29, 2018, Governor Inslee appointed Chun to the Washington Court of Appeals, Division One. He ran unopposed to retain his seat in the November 2019 election.

Notable appellate rulings included Zaitzeff v. City of Seattle (2021), in which Chun upheld Seattle's "dangerous knife" ordinance as not violating the Second Amendment as applied to a defendant carrying a sword, and State v. Daniels (2019), holding that a trial court judge could not admit a defendant into Drug Diversion Court over the prosecutor's objection.

== Federal judicial service ==
=== Nomination and confirmation ===
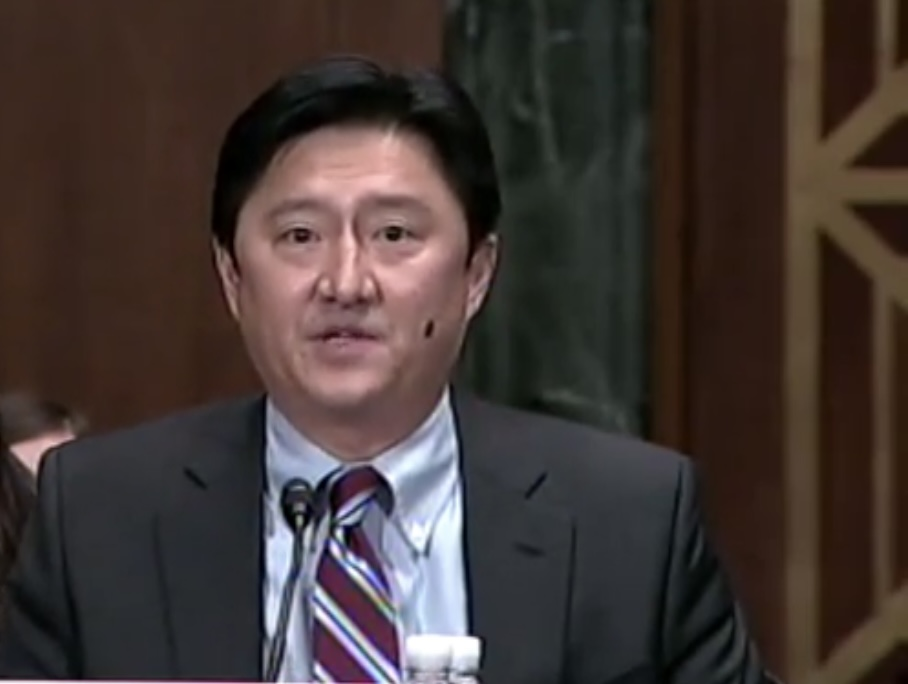
Chun testifying before the Senate Judiciary Committee

On September 30, 2021, President Joe Biden announced his intent to nominate Chun to serve as a United States district judge for the Western District of Washington. His nomination was recommended by Senators Patty Murray and Maria Cantwell through Murray's bipartisan judicial merit selection committee.

On November 17, 2021, a hearing on his nomination was held before the Senate Judiciary Committee. During the hearing, Chun was questioned by Republican senators about his 2003 amicus brief in Grutter v. Bollinger supporting race-conscious university admissions. On January 20, 2022, the committee voted 12–10 to report his nomination favorably to the full Senate—the narrowest margin among nominees considered that day.

Chun's nomination was initially submitted on September 30, 2021, but was returned to the President on January 3, 2022, under Senate Rule XXXI, Paragraph 6, due to the Senate's sine die adjournment. Biden renominated him the same day.

On March 16, 2022, the Senate voted 50–45 to invoke cloture on the nomination. On March 23, 2022, the Senate confirmed Chun by a vote of 49–47, largely along party lines. He received his judicial commission on March 30, 2022, and was sworn in on April 11, 2022, by Chief District Judge Ricardo S. Martinez at the United States Courthouse in Seattle.

=== Notable cases ===
==== FTC v. Amazon (antitrust) ====
In September 2023, the Federal Trade Commission and 17 state attorneys general filed an antitrust lawsuit against Amazon, alleging the company maintained illegal monopoly power in online retail and marketplace services (Case No. 2:23-cv-01495).

On September 30, 2024, Chun issued a ruling on Amazon's motion to dismiss, allowing nearly all 20 counts to proceed, including all federal antitrust claims under Sherman Act Section 2. The claims addressed Amazon's pricing algorithm known as "Project Nessie," Fulfillment by Amazon tying practices, "Buy Box" allocation, and anti-discounting policies. He dismissed some state consumer protection claims from New Jersey, Pennsylvania, Oklahoma, and Maryland. Chun also granted the FTC's request to bifurcate the case into separate liability and remedies phases. Trial is scheduled for October 2026.

==== FTC v. Amazon.com (Prime subscription) ====
In a separate case, the FTC alleged that Amazon used "dark patterns"—deceptive user interface designs—to trick consumers into enrolling in Amazon Prime subscriptions and made cancellation unnecessarily difficult (Case No. 2:23-cv-00932).

On May 28, 2024, Chun issued a 49-page opinion denying Amazon's motion to dismiss, allowing the case to proceed against both the company and three senior executives. He found the FTC had plausibly alleged Amazon made enrollment substantially easier than cancellation and could potentially be subject to civil penalties under the FTC Act.

==== State of Oregon v. Trump ====
On January 9, 2026, Chun issued a 75-page ruling blocking key provisions of President Donald Trump's Executive Order 14248, which imposed requirements on federal election administration. Chun found the President exceeded his constitutional authority in ordering documentary proof of citizenship for federal voter registration forms and requiring all mail ballots be received by Election Day.

== Professional memberships ==
Chun has served on the boards of the King County Bar Association and the Federal Bar Association of the Western District of Washington. He is a member of the Korean American Bar Association of Washington, the Asian Bar Association of Washington, and the International Association of Korean Lawyers. He has chaired the Washington State Center for Court Research Advisory Board and served on the Court of Appeals Rules Committee and the advisory board of the Judicial Institute.

== Awards and recognition ==
Chun received a "Well Qualified" rating from the American Bar Association Standing Committee on the Federal Judiciary. He received the Distinguished Alumni Achievement Award from Catlin Gabel School in 2020 and the Community Leadership Award from the Korean American Bar Association of Washington in 2007. He was named a "Washington Litigation Star" by Benchmark Litigation in 2014 and a "Top 100 Washington Super Lawyer" by Super Lawyers in 2007, 2011, and 2013.

== Personal life ==
Chun resides in Seattle with his wife and children. He has served on the board of the Washington Low Income Housing Alliance and has performed pro bono legal work throughout his career.

== See also ==
- List of Asian American jurists

Legal offices
Preceded by James Robart	Judge of the United States District Court for the Western District of Washington; 2022–present	Incumbent
