= William Lee Dwyer =

American judge

Senior Judge of the United States District Court for the Western District of Washington
- In office December 1, 1998 – February 12, 2002

Judge of the United States District Court for the Western District of Washington
- In office November 6, 1987 – December 1, 1998
- Appointed by: Ronald Reagan
- Preceded by: Donald S. Voorhees
- Succeeded by: Marsha J. Pechman

Personal details
- Born: William Lee Dwyer; March 26, 1929 Olympia, Washington
- Died: February 12, 2002 (aged 72) Seattle, Washington
- Education: University of Washington (BS); New York University (LLB)

Military service
- Branch/service: United States Army
- Years of service: 1953–1956
- Unit: United States Army Judge Advocate General's Corps

William Lee Dwyer (March 26, 1929 – February 12, 2002) was an American attorney and jurist who served as a United States district judge of the United States District Court for the Western District of Washington.

== Early life and education ==
Born in Olympia, Washington, Dwyer received a Bachelor of Science degree from the University of Washington in 1951 and a Bachelor of Laws from New York University School of Law in 1953.

== Career ==
He served in the United States Army Judge Advocate General's Corps from 1953 to 1956, achieving the rank of lieutenant. He was a law clerk for the Washington Supreme Court in 1957, and was then in private practice in Seattle, Washington from 1957 to 1987. During his time in private practice, Dwyer was hired by then-Attorney General Slade Gorton to oversee a case against Major League Baseball following the loss of the Seattle Pilots. It ultimately resulted in the creation of a new team, the Seattle Mariners, and the case was withdrawn.

On July 28, 1987, Dwyer was nominated by President Ronald Reagan to a seat on the United States District Court for the Western District of Washington vacated by Judge Donald S. Voorhees. Dwyer was confirmed by the United States Senate on November 5, 1987, and received his commission on November 6, 1987. He assumed senior status on December 1, 1998, serving in that capacity until his death, in Seattle, Washington.

== Sources ==
Legal offices
Preceded by Donald S. Voorhees	Judge of the United States District Court for the Western District of Washington; 1987–1998	Succeeded by Marsha J. Pechman
