= Marsha J. Pechman =

American judge (born 1951)

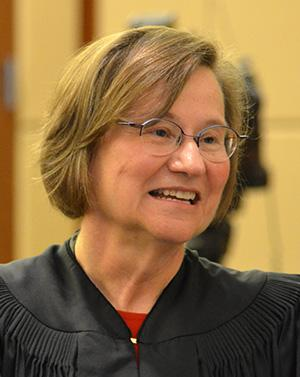

Senior Judge of the United States District Court for the Western District of Washington
- Incumbent
- Assumed office February 6, 2016

Chief Judge of the United States District Court for the Western District of Washington
- In office September 1, 2011 – February 6, 2016
- Preceded by: Robert S. Lasnik
- Succeeded by: Ricardo S. Martinez

Judge of the United States District Court for the Western District of Washington
- In office September 9, 1999 – February 6, 2016
- Appointed by: Bill Clinton
- Preceded by: William Lee Dwyer
- Succeeded by: Tana Lin

Personal details
- Born: February 6, 1951 (age 75) Salem, Oregon, U.S.
- Education: Cornell University (BA); Boston University (JD)

Marsha J. Pechman (born February 6, 1951) is a senior United States district judge of the United States District Court for the Western District of Washington.

== Education and career ==
Born in Salem, Oregon, Pechman received a Bachelor of Arts degree from Cornell University in 1973 and a Juris Doctor from Boston University School of Law in 1976. She was a legal intern, King County Prosecutor's Office in 1976. She was a deputy prosecutor, King County Prosecuting Attorney's Office from 1976 to 1979. She was an instructor/staff attorney of University of Washington School of Law from 1979 to 1981. She was in private practice in Seattle from 1981 to 1988. She was an adjunct professor at University of Puget Sound from 1983 to 1987. She was a judge on the King County Superior Court from 1988 to 1999.

=== Federal judicial service ===
On March 24, 1999, Pechman was nominated by President Bill Clinton to a seat on the United States District Court for the Western District of Washington vacated by William Lee Dwyer. She was confirmed by the United States Senate on September 8, 1999, and received her commission on September 9, 1999. On September 1, 2011, she became Chief Judge, succeeding Judge Robert S. Lasnik. She assumed senior status on February 6, 2016.

== Notable case ==
Pechman is most well known for presiding over the 2008 trial between the City of Seattle and the owners of the Seattle SuperSonics.

Pechman sat on the Karnoski v. Trump case for over three years without issuing a decision. Joe Biden eventually repealed the Trump trans soldier ban.

She wrote the district court opinion in Trueblood v. Washington State DSHS.

== Personal ==
Pechman has two daughters.

Legal offices
Preceded by William Lee Dwyer	Judge of the United States District Court for the Western District of Washington; 1999–2016	Succeeded by Tana Lin
Preceded by Robert S. Lasnik	Chief Judge of the United States District Court for the Western District of Washington; 2011–2016	Succeeded by Ricardo S. Martinez
