= Charles T. Wright =

American judge (1911–1980)

Charles Thomas Wright (March 7, 1911 – November 6, 1980) was a justice of the Washington Supreme Court from 1971 until his death in 1980.

Born in Washington, his father was Thurston-Mason County Superior Court judge D. F. Wright, and his mother was "one of the first women admitted to the state bar". Wright received an undergraduate degree from the College of Puget Sound, and then studied law at the University of Washington.

He left law school in 1934 to work for as a law clerk for his father, and gained admission to the bar in 1937, serving as a prosecuting attorney for Mason County from 1942 to 1944. He "succeeded his father on the Thurston-Mason bench in 1949".

In 1970, Wright defeated the incumbent Morell Edward Sharp, who had been appointed to fill an unexpired term on the state supreme court. Wright was reelected to full terms in 1972 and 1978. He rotated into service as chief justice from 1975 to 1977.

Wright and his wife, Helen, had one son, and were foster parents to 17 children.

Political offices
Preceded by Morell Edward Sharp	Justice of the Washington Supreme Court; 1971–1980	Succeeded by Carolyn R. Dimmick
