= Faith Ireland =

American judge

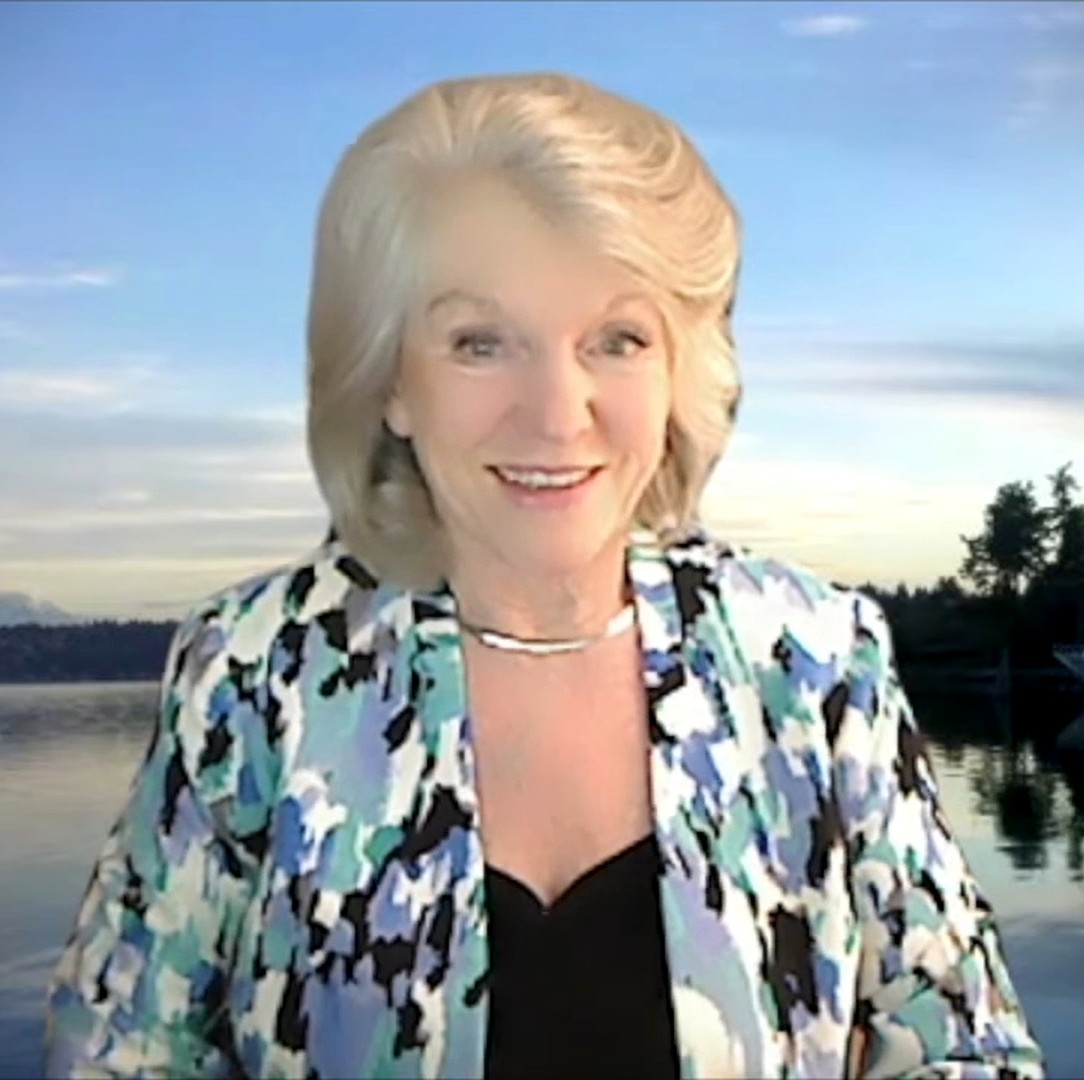
- Ireland in 2020

Associate Justice of the Washington Supreme Court
- In office 1999–2005
- Preceded by: James M. Dolliver
- Succeeded by: James M. Johnson

Judge on the King County Superior Court
- In office 1983–1999
- Appointed by: John Spellman

Personal details
- Born: Faith Enyeart; September 15, 1942 (age 84) Seattle, Washington
- Spouse: Chuck Norem
- Education: University of Washington; Willamette University College of Law

Faith Enyeart Ireland (born September 15, 1942) is an American lawyer, mediator, and former judge in the state of Washington. She was a county trial judge for 15 years before serving as an associate justice on the Washington Supreme Court from 1999 to 2005. Ireland is also a world champion powerlifter.

== Early life ==
Faith Enyeart was born on September 15, 1942, in Seattle, Washington. She was raised in neighboring Burien where she graduated from Highline High School in 1960. Following high school she attended the University of Washington in Seattle where she graduated with a bachelor of arts degree in 1965. She then graduated from law school at Willamette University College of Law in 1969, earning a Juris Doctor from the Salem, Oregon, school. In law school she was one of only two women in her graduating class.

While an undergraduate in college at the age of 22, the unmarried Ireland became pregnant with a daughter. After discussing the situation with her parents, she went to a special home for single mothers in Colorado where she gave birth. Ireland put the baby up for adoption, in what she called "...one of the worst things that ever happened in my life" and "the hardest decision I've ever had to make in my life." She later joined an adoption registry and re-united with her then adult daughter in 1997. Since then she has enjoyed "finally being a mother, and now a grandmother to a wonderful young man." Ireland chose to speak out about the adoption as a Justice, saying "I wanted to help reduce some of the shame around issues of adoption and let young people know that you can be a birth parent and still go on and have a successful career and a successful life." Ireland is married to William (Chuck) Norem.

== Legal career ==
Ireland entered private legal practice in Seattle at the law firm of McCune, Godfrey and Emerick where she worked from 1970 until 1973. In 1974, she started her own single practitioner firm in Seattle's Pioneer Square neighborhood. Her firm, Faith Enyeart and Associates, handled legal issues from family law, personal injury, business law, tax, and criminal defense. While in private practice she returned to school and earned a master's of science degree in taxation from a satellite campus of Golden Gate University in Seattle in 1984, graduating with honors. During this time Ireland served on the board of the Washington State Trial Lawyer's Association and was one of the founding members of the Washington Women Lawyers.

== Judicial career ==
In 1983, Ireland left private practice when she was appointed to the King County Superior Court by Governor John Spellman. Ireland won the subsequent election for a full term on the court, and was re-elected four times. In 1994, she ran for a seat on the Washington Supreme Court, the highest court in Washington. Ireland finished third, with Gerry L. Alexander winning the seat. While on the King County court she was dean of the Washington Judicial College. She spent six years on the superior court judge group's board of trustees and was president for one year of the group. Her further service included a position on the Board for Court Education, and as vice chairperson from 1996 to 1998 of the Board for Judicial Administration. In 1998, the Leadership Institute in Judicial Education awarded her a distinguished service award. Also that year she was also named Judge of the Year by the state trial lawyer's association. While on the court she changed her last name to Ireland. Ireland's mother's maiden name was Janice Marcia Ireland.

In 1998, she ran a second time to join Washington's highest court in a bid to replace the retiring James M. Dolliver. In the primary election she finished first out of seven candidates and faced James Foley in the November general election. Ireland defeated Foley in November and won a six-year term on the court. With the election of Mary Fairhurst in 2002, Ireland became part of the only state Supreme Court at that time to have a majority of women.

In 2004, Ireland announced she would not seek re-election, and left the court at the end of her term on January 10, 2005. In 2005, she earned a certificate in mediation from the Pepperdine University School of Law and established a practice as a private mediator.

== Weightlifting ==
Two weeks after her appointment to the bench in 1983, Ireland was rear ended in a car crash and injured her back. After several years of unsuccessful physical therapy, Ireland turned to weightlifting to attempt to permanently fix the back pain. Ireland continued to lift and became a powerlifter, participating in competitions in the US, Europe, India, and South America. She won five world championships, seven USAPL national championships, and set 15 world records and 27 American records from three federations before retiring from competition in 2014.

== Later years ==
In May 2006, Ireland wrote the majority opinion in a case where the state and private parties had sued the state's largest teachers' union for failing to comply with Initiative 134. The initiative, passed in 1992, prohibited unions from spending dues collected by non-members on political issues without first getting their permission. In the opinion, Ireland (serving as justice pro tempore) wrote the law was unconstitutional as it was "too heavy an administrative burden" on the union to get permission from each non-member. Subsequently, the U.S. Supreme Court overturned the Washington court's decision in Davenport v. Washington Education Association.

Ireland and fellow former justice Robert F. Utter sued the Building Industry Association of Washington (BIAW) in 2008 over allegations the BIAW had violated campaign finance laws in its support of Dino Rossi, the Republican candidate for governor.

Running against Democratic incumbent Christine Gregoire, Rossi was accused of encouraging the BIAW to raise campaign funds for him before he had officially announced his candidacy. Rossi denied he had done anything illegal and claimed he could not recall details of his meetings with BIAW members, and called the lawsuit "a political stunt" by his opponents (Ireland and Utter had both donated money to Gregoire). In 2015, the Washington Supreme Court allowed the citizen suit to proceed, and denied the defendant's summary judgment motion. In April 2016, the plaintiffs settled with BIAW for $582,000. Utter and Ireland received no part of the proceeds. In addition a penalty fee to the State of Washington was assessed.

== Civic involvement ==
Ireland is a member of several boards of directors for local community groups. She is the longest serving woman member of Seattle 4 Rotary admitted in 1987, the first month that women were allowed to be members. She has served on its Board of Directors. She was named "Chinese Man of the Year" for her work to help build the Wing Luke Asian Museum, even though she is neither Chinese nor a man. Ireland served as Vice-Chair of the Sheriff's Blue Ribbon Panel which in 2006 recommended sweeping reforms for the King County Sheriff's Office.

Other positions in the legal community have included first female president of the state Superior Court Judges Association, president of the local chapter of the American Judicature Society, chairperson of the Superior Court Education Committee, member of the Appellate Judges Education Committee for the State Supreme Court, and the executive committee for the Council on Public Legal Education. Awards include being named as a Distinguished Alumni in 2000 at Willamette University, and a Woman of Distinction by the Puget Sound Business Journal. She received the Judge of the Year and the Carl Maxey award from the Washington State Associatioin for Justice and the Passing the Torch Award and the President's Award from Washington Women Lawyers.

Legal offices
Preceded by James M. Dolliver	Associate Justice of the Washington Supreme Court; 1999 – 2005	Succeeded by James M. Johnson
