= Donald S. Voorhees =

American judge

Senior Judge of the United States District Court for the Western District of Washington
- In office November 30, 1986 – July 7, 1989

Judge of the United States District Court for the Western District of Washington
- In office June 20, 1974 – November 30, 1986
- Appointed by: Richard Nixon
- Preceded by: William T. Beeks
- Succeeded by: William Lee Dwyer

Personal details
- Born: Donald S. Voorhees; July 30, 1916 Leavenworth, Kansas
- Died: July 7, 1989 (aged 72) Seattle, Washington
- Resting place: Evergreen Washelli Memorial Park; Seattle, Washington
- Education: University of Kansas (A.B.); Harvard Law School (J.D.)

Donald S. Voorhees (July 30, 1916 – July 7, 1989) was a United States district judge of the United States District Court for the Western District of Washington.

== Education and career ==
Born in Leavenworth, Kansas, Voorhees received an Artium Baccalaureus degree from the University of Kansas in 1938. He received a Juris Doctor from Harvard Law School in 1946. He was a United States Naval Reserve Lieutenant from 1942 to 1946. He was in private practice in Tulsa, Oklahoma from 1946 to 1947. He was in private practice in Seattle, Washington from 1947 to 1974.

== Federal judicial service ==
Voorhees was nominated by President Richard Nixon on May 28, 1974, to a seat on the United States District Court for the Western District of Washington vacated by Judge William T. Beeks. He was confirmed by the United States Senate on June 13, 1974, and received his commission on June 20, 1974. He assumed senior status on November 30, 1986. His service terminated on July 7, 1989, due to his death.

=== Other service ===
Voorhees served three years on the board of the Federal Judicial Center in Washington, D.C. He wrote a manual for judges, Recurring Problems in the Trial of Criminal Actions. In 1985, he received the Seattle-King County Bar Association Award for Distinguished Service. In 1988, he was honored at the annual banquet of the Federal Bar Association.

== Notable cases ==
Of Voorhees' rulings during his twelve years on the Federal bench, none was considered more noteworthy than the 1986 decision in which he found that the Government improperly concealed evidence from the courts at a 1944 hearing on whether there was a military necessity to remove Japanese Americans from their homes in the Western states to internment camps.

The ruling overturned the conviction of Gordon K. Hirabayashi, who had fought exclusion, and was viewed by Japanese Americans as a landmark vindication of their long-held belief that their civil rights were violated during the war. It was followed by Congress's decision to give $20,000 and an apology to each Japanese American who had been forced into the camps.

Voorhees also issued a major ruling in a school desegregation case in 1979 when he overturned an anti-busing initiative approved by Washington State voters. That ruling, upheld by the Supreme Court, allowed the Seattle school district to carry out its desegregation plan. His ruling in another case barred county jails from conducting random strip searches of prisoners, without warrant or reason, after several suits filed by women who were strip and cavity searched following traffic violations and noise complaints. In 1978, Voorhees ruled that the Washington State Liquor Control Board return the 645 cases of liquor which had been confiscated from the Tulalip tribe before the shipment could reach the reservation.

== Legacy and Death ==
Voorhees died at the Hospice Northwest in Seattle, at age 72. He was interred at Evergreen Washelli Memorial Park in the Bitter Lake neighborhood of the city. Discovery Park in the Magnolia neighborhood was named by him after the ship HMS Discovery, which was commanded by George Vancouver on his expedition in the Pacific Northwest. The Judge Voorhees Room at the park is named in his honor.

Legal offices
Preceded by William T. Beeks	Judge of the United States District Court for the Western District of Washington; 1974–1986	Succeeded by William Lee Dwyer
