= Ronald B. Leighton =

American judge (born 1951)

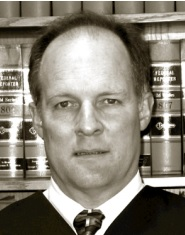
- circa 2002

Senior Judge of the United States District Court for the Western District of Washington
- In office February 28, 2019 – August 31, 2020

Judge of the United States District Court for the Western District of Washington
- In office November 26, 2002 – February 28, 2019
- Appointed by: George W. Bush
- Preceded by: Robert Jensen Bryan
- Succeeded by: David Estudillo

Personal details
- Born: Ronald Bruce Leighton; 1951 (age 74–75) Stockton, California, U.S.
- Education: Whitworth College (BA); University of California, Hastings College of Law (JD)

Ronald Bruce Leighton (born 1951) is a former United States district judge of the United States District Court for the Western District of Washington.

== Education and career ==
Born in Stockton, California, Leighton received a Bachelor of Arts degree from Whitworth College in 1973 and a Juris Doctor from the University of California, Hastings College of Law in 1976. He was in private practice in Tacoma, Washington, from 1976 to 2002.

== Federal judicial service ==
On January 23, 2002, Leighton was nominated by President George W. Bush to a seat on the United States District Court for the Western District of Washington vacated by Robert Jensen Bryan. Leighton was confirmed by the United States Senate on November 14, 2002, and received his commission on November 26, 2002. He assumed senior status on February 28, 2019. He retired from active service on August 31, 2020.

== Post-judgeship ==
Since September 1, 2021, Leighton has been of counsel at FAVROS Law.

== Sources ==
Legal offices
Preceded by Robert Jensen Bryan	Judge of the United States District Court for the Western District of Washington; 2002–2019	Succeeded by David Estudillo
