= Kymberly Evanson =

American judge (born 1977)

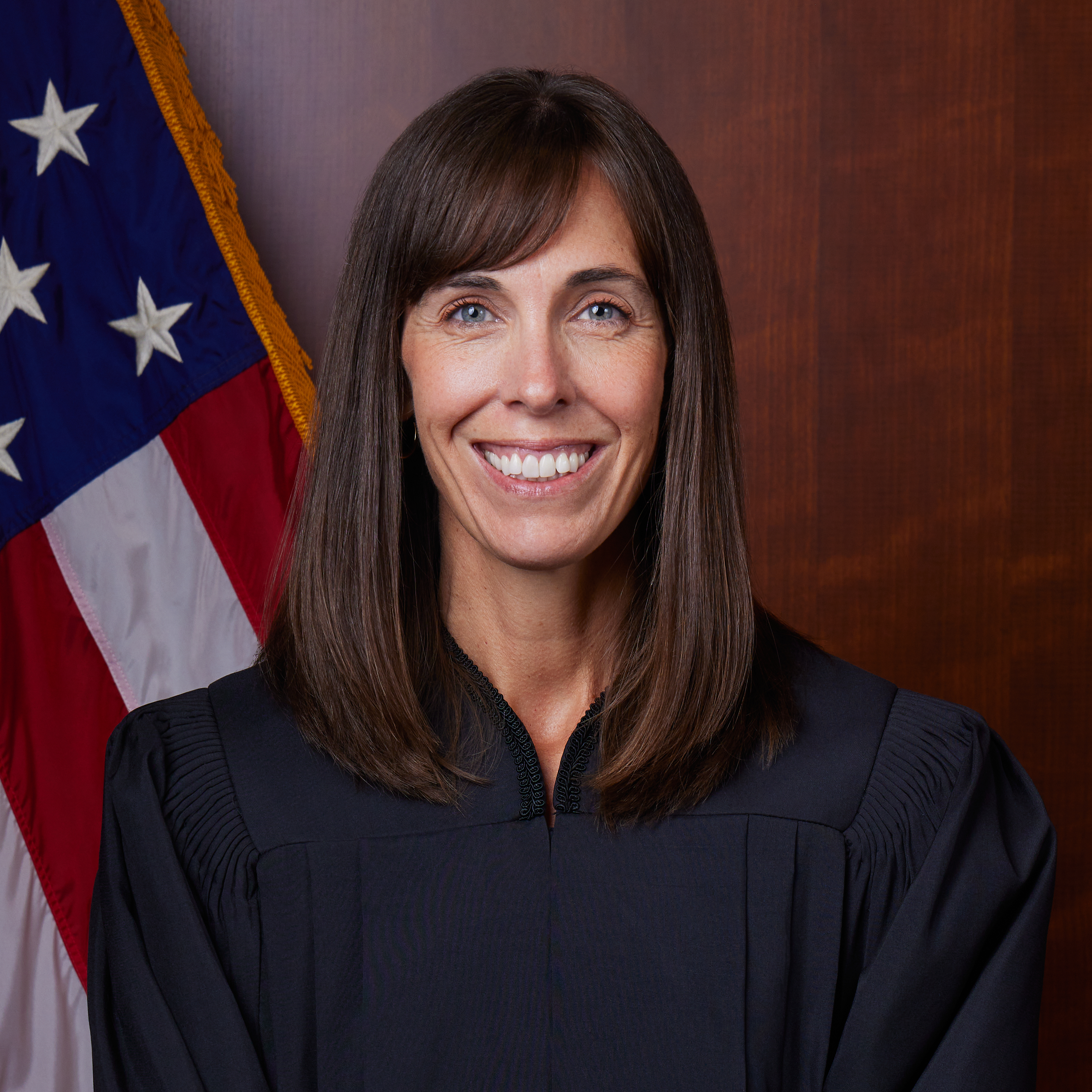

Judge of the United States District Court for the Western District of Washington
- Incumbent
- Assumed office July 18, 2023
- Appointed by: Joe Biden
- Preceded by: Ricardo S. Martinez

Personal details
- Born: Kymberly Kathryn Evans; 1977 (age 48–49) Longview, Washington, U.S.
- Education: Seattle University (BA); Georgetown University (JD)

Kymberly Kathryn Evanson (née Evans; born 1977) is an American lawyer who serves as a United States district judge of the United States District Court for the Western District of Washington.

== Education ==
Evanson earned a Bachelor of Arts degree from Seattle University in 1999 and a Juris Doctor from the Georgetown University Law Center in 2007. At Seattle University, she was a recipient of the Sullivan Leadership Award, and was also selected as a 1998 Truman Scholar.

== Career ==
From 2002 to 2004, Evanson worked as a program coordinator for the Access to Justice Institute at Seattle University School of Law. In 2005, she was a law clerk at Cashdan & Kane LLP in Washington, D.C. In 2006, she was an intern in the United States Department of Justice Civil Division. From 2007 to 2008, she served as a law clerk for Judge Emmet G. Sullivan of the United States District Court for the District of Columbia. From 2009 to 2011, she was an associate at K&L Gates in Seattle. She was a partner at the Seattle law firm Pacifica Law Group from 2011 to 2023.

In 2017, Evanson represented the ACLU of Washington in a suit against the Trump administration's foreign travel ban in Washington v. Trump.

=== Federal judicial service ===
On July 13, 2022, President Joe Biden nominated Evanson to serve as a United States district judge of the United States District Court for the Western District of Washington. President Biden nominated Evanson to the seat vacated by Judge Ricardo S. Martinez, who subsequently assumed senior status on September 5, 2022. On November 15, 2022, a hearing on her nomination was held before the Senate Judiciary Committee. On December 8, 2022, her nomination was reported out of committee by a 12–10 vote. On January 3, 2023, her nomination was returned to the President under Rule XXXI, Paragraph 6 of the United States Senate. She was renominated on January 23, 2023. On February 9, 2023, her nomination was reported out of committee by a 12–9 vote. On July 11, 2023, the Senate invoked cloture on her nomination by a 51–42 vote. Later that day, her nomination was confirmed by a 50–42 vote. She received her judicial commission on July 18, 2023. She was sworn in on September 7, 2023.

Legal offices
Preceded by Ricardo S. Martinez	Judge of the United States District Court for the Western District of Washington; 2023–present	Incumbent
