= Clinton Woodbury Howard =

American judge

Judge of the United States District Court for the Western District of Washington
- In office August 26, 1912 – March 3, 1913
- Appointed by: William Howard Taft
- Preceded by: Cornelius H. Hanford
- Succeeded by: Jeremiah Neterer

Personal details
- Born: Clinton Woodbury Howard; July 25, 1864 Lima, Ohio
- Died: February 23, 1937 (aged 72)
- Education: Griswold College (B.S.); University of Michigan Law School (LL.B.)

Clinton Woodbury Howard (July 25, 1864 – February 23, 1937) was a United States district judge of the United States District Court for the Western District of Washington.

== Education and career ==
Born in Lima, Ohio, Howard received a Bachelor of Science degree from Griswold College in 1885 and a Bachelor of Laws from the University of Michigan Law School in 1887. He was in private practice in Mount Pleasant, Iowa from 1887 to 1889, and after that in Bellingham, Washington Territory (State of Washington from November 11, 1889) starting in 1889. He was city attorney of Fairhaven, Washington from 1891 to 1892, and an assistant county attorney of Whatcom County, Washington from 1892 to 1893.

== Federal judicial service ==
Howard received a recess appointment from President William Howard Taft on August 26, 1912, to a seat on the United States District Court for the Western District of Washington vacated by Judge Cornelius H. Hanford. He was nominated to the same position by President Taft on December 3, 1912. His service terminated on March 3, 1913, after his nomination was not confirmed by the United States Senate, which never held a vote on his nomination.

== Later career and death ==
Howard resumed private practice in Bellingham. He died on February 23, 1937.

== Sources ==
Legal offices
Preceded by Cornelius H. Hanford	Judge of the United States District Court for the Western District of Washington; 1912–1913	Succeeded by Jeremiah Neterer
