= John Clyde Bowen =

American judge

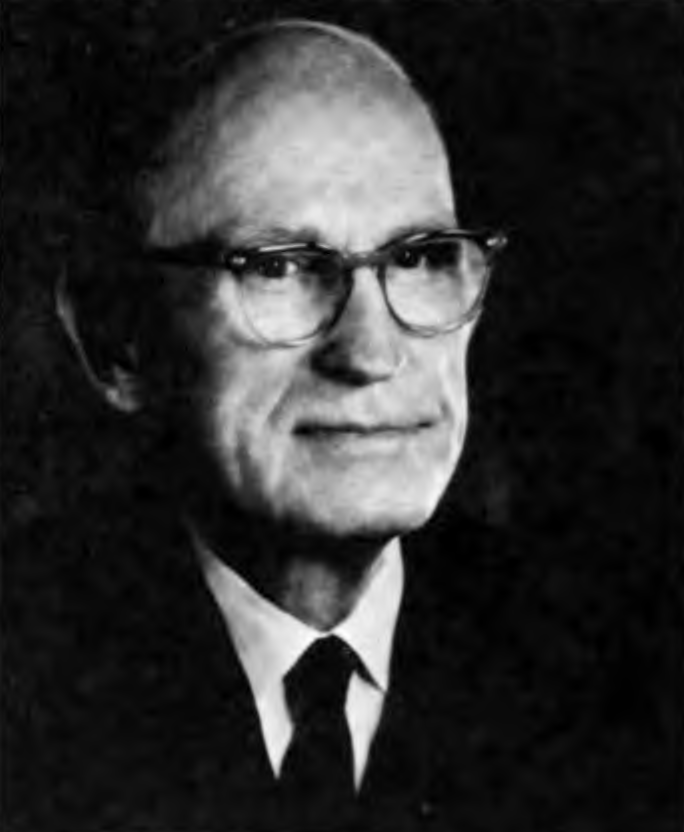

Senior Judge of the United States District Court for the Western District of Washington
- In office June 5, 1961 – April 27, 1978

Chief Judge of the United States District Court for the Western District of Washington
- In office 1948–1959
- Preceded by: Office established
- Succeeded by: William James Lindberg

Judge of the United States District Court for the Western District of Washington
- In office March 20, 1934 – June 5, 1961
- Appointed by: Franklin D. Roosevelt
- Preceded by: Jeremiah Neterer
- Succeeded by: William T. Beeks

Personal details
- Born: John Clyde Bowen; May 12, 1888 Newbern, Tennessee
- Died: April 27, 1978 (aged 89)
- Education: University of Tennessee (B.A.); Harvard Law School (LL.B.)

John Clyde Bowen (May 12, 1888 – April 27, 1978) was a United States district judge of the United States District Court for the Western District of Washington.

== Education and career ==
Born in Newbern, Tennessee, Bowen received a Bachelor of Arts degree from the University of Tennessee in 1913 and a Bachelor of Laws from Harvard Law School in 1916. He was a Lieutenant in the United States Army F.A.R.C. during World War I from 1917 to 1918. He entered private practice in Seattle, Washington in 1919, and was a member of the Washington State Senate in 1931, and later a legal adviser to the Governor of Washington in 1933. He was a tax collector for the Internal Revenue Service for the Districts of Washington and the Territory of Alaska from 1933 to 1934.

== Federal judicial service ==
On February 22, 1934, Bowen was nominated by President Franklin D. Roosevelt to a seat on the United States District Court for the Western District of Washington vacated by Judge Jeremiah Neterer. Bowen was confirmed by the United States Senate on February 28, 1934, and received his commission on March 20, 1934. He served as Chief Judge from 1948 to 1959. He assumed senior status on June 5, 1961. Bowen served in that capacity until his death on April 27, 1978.

== See also ==
- List of United States federal judges by longevity of service

== Sources ==
Legal offices
Preceded by Jeremiah Neterer	Judge of the United States District Court for the Western District of Washington; 1934–1961	Succeeded by William T. Beeks
Preceded by Office established	Chief Judge of the United States District Court for the Western District of Washington; 1948–1959	Succeeded by William James Lindberg
