= Jeremiah Neterer =

American judge

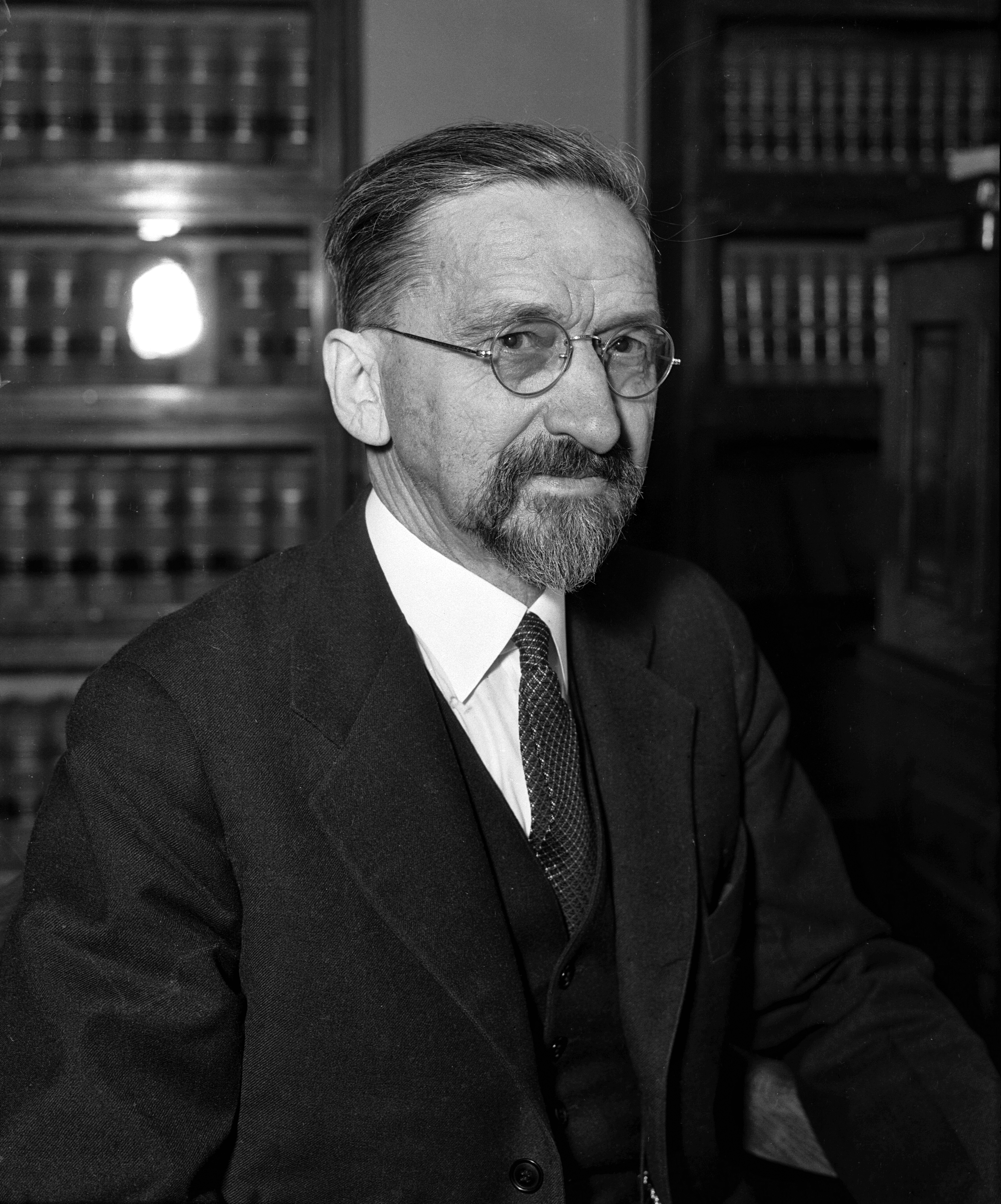
- Neterer in 1935

Senior Judge of the United States District Court for the Western District of Washington
- In office May 31, 1933 – February 2, 1943

Judge of the United States District Court for the Western District of Washington
- In office March 4, 1913 – May 31, 1933
- Appointed by: Woodrow Wilson
- Preceded by: Clinton Woodbury Howard
- Succeeded by: John Clyde Bowen

Personal details
- Born: Jeremiah Neterer; January 24, 1862 Goshen, Indiana
- Died: February 2, 1943 (aged 81)
- Education: Valparaiso University School of Law (LL.B.)

Jeremiah Neterer (January 24, 1862 – February 2, 1943) was a United States district judge of the United States District Court for the Western District of Washington.

== Education and career ==
Born in Goshen, Indiana, Neterer received a Bachelor of Laws from Valparaiso University School of Law in 1885. He was in private practice in Bellingham, Washington from 1890 to 1913, serving as the city attorney of Bellingham in 1893. He became a Judge of the Superior Court of Whatcom County, Washington in 1901.

== Federal judicial service ==
Neterer received a recess appointment from President Woodrow Wilson on March 4, 1913, to a seat on the United States District Court for the Western District of Washington vacated by Judge Clinton Woodbury Howard. He was nominated to the same position by President Wilson on July 2, 1913. He was confirmed by the United States Senate on July 21, 1913, and received his commission the same day. He assumed senior status on May 31, 1933. His service terminated on February 2, 1943, due to his death.

== Sources ==
Legal offices
Preceded by Clinton Woodbury Howard	Judge of the United States District Court for the Western District of Washington; 1913–1933	Succeeded by John Clyde Bowen
