= Tana Lin =

American judge (born 1966)

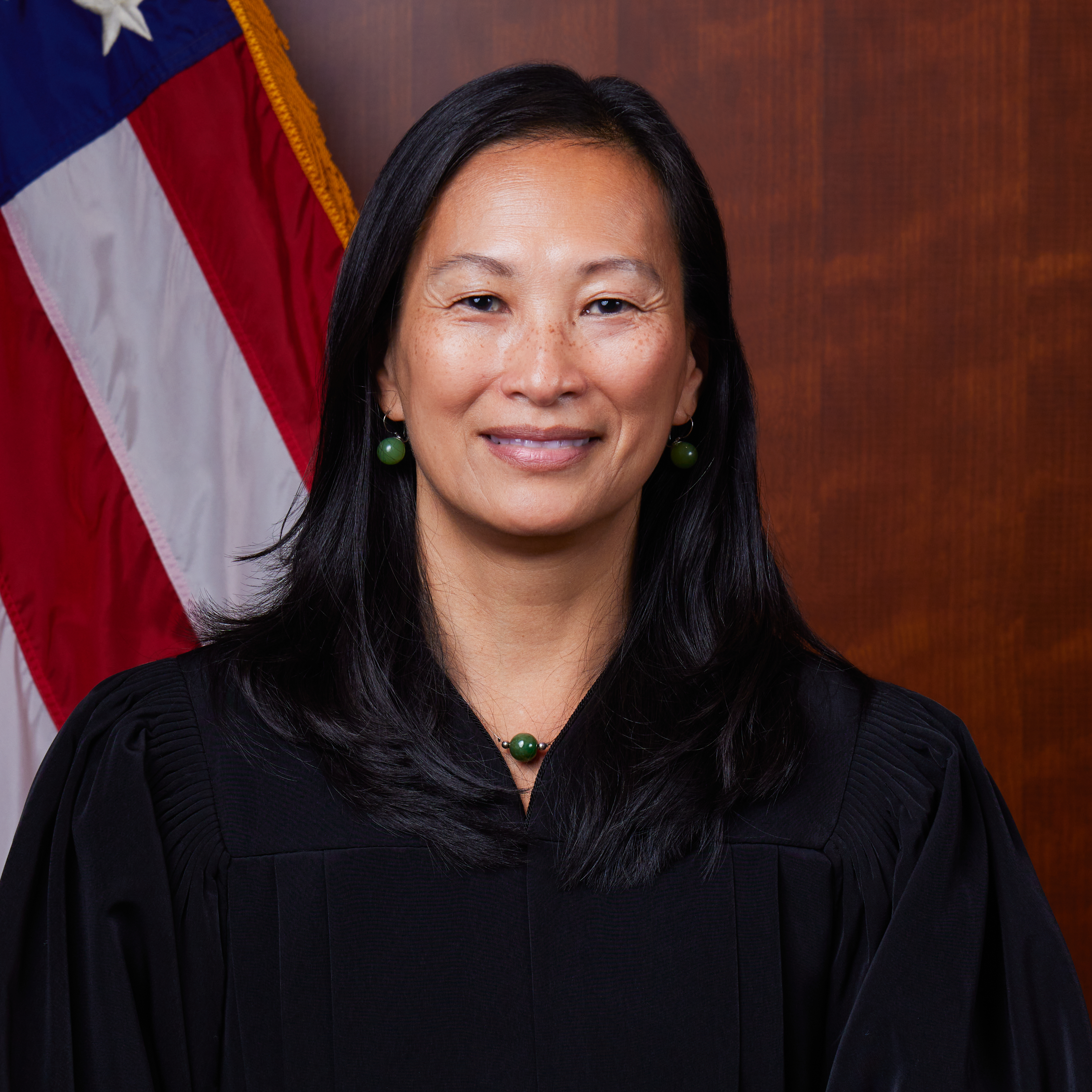

Judge of the United States District Court for the Western District of Washington
- Incumbent
- Assumed office November 23, 2021
- Appointed by: Joe Biden
- Preceded by: Marsha J. Pechman

Personal details
- Born: 1966 (age 59–60) Taipei, Taiwan
- Education: Cornell University (BA); New York University (JD)

Tana Lin (born 1966) is a Taiwanese-American lawyer who is a United States district judge of the United States District Court for the Western District of Washington. She is the first Taiwanese American woman to serve on the district court.

== Early life and education ==
Lin was born in Taipei to a Taiwanese American family and moved to the United States as a child. She lived in Lawrence, Kansas, while her father was a graduate student at the University of Kansas before the family eventually settled in Chicago. She graduated from Cornell University with a Bachelor of Arts with distinction in 1988 and earned her Juris Doctor from the New York University School of Law in 1991.

== Career ==
Lin began her legal career as a staff attorney at the Public Defender Service for the District of Columbia from 1991 to 1995. From 1995 to 1999, she was an attorney with the United States Department of Justice Employment Litigation Section. From 1999 to 2001, she was a senior trial attorney at the United States Equal Employment Opportunity Commission's Chicago district office. From 2001 to 2004, she was the litigation coordinator at the Michigan Poverty Law Program. From 2004 to 2021, she was with Keller Rohrback, first as an associate from 2004 to 2007, as a partner from 2008 to 2019, and as of counsel from 2020 to 2021.

Lin served on the board of directors for the American Civil Liberties Union (ACLU) of Washington from 2016 to 2021 and as the board's president 2019 to 2021.

=== Federal judicial service ===
On April 29, 2021, President Joe Biden nominated Lin to serve as a United States district judge for the United States District Court for the Western District of Washington to the seat vacated by Judge Marsha J. Pechman, who assumed senior status on February 6, 2016. On June 9, 2021, a hearing on her nomination was held before the Senate Judiciary Committee. On July 15, 2021, her nomination was reported out of committee by an 11–10 vote, with Senator Lindsey Graham passed on the vote. On October 21, 2021, the United States Senate invoked cloture on her nomination by a 52–47 vote. Her nomination was confirmed later that day by a 52–45 vote. She received her commission on November 23, 2021. She was sworn in on December 8, 2021. Lin became the district's first Asian American Article III judge.

== See also ==
- List of Asian American jurists

Legal offices
| Preceded by Marsha J. Pechman | Judge of the United States District Court for the Western District of Washington; 2021–present | Incumbent |
