= George Hugo Boldt =

American judge

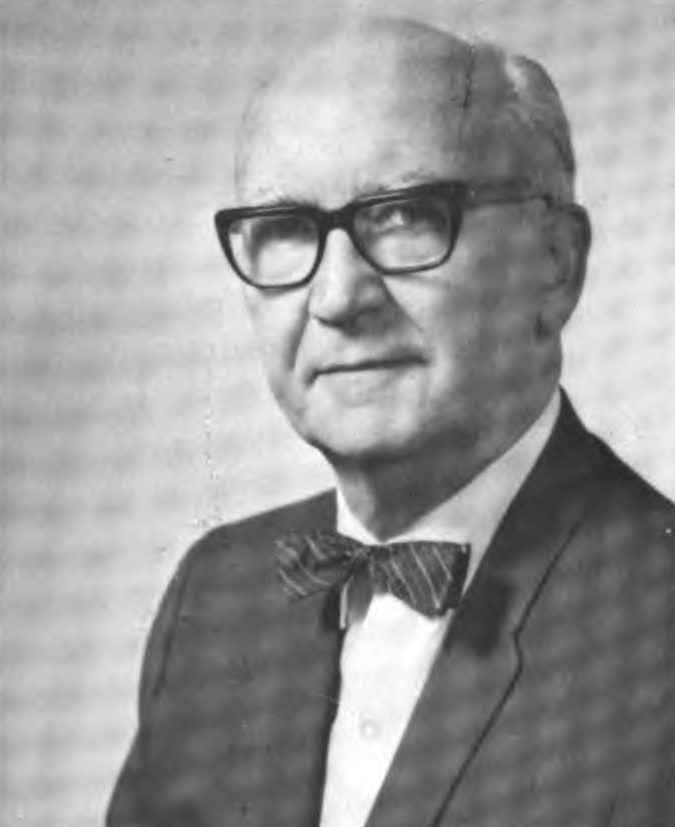

Senior Judge of the United States District Court for the Western District of Washington
- In office October 30, 1971 – March 18, 1984

Chief Judge of the United States District Court for the Western District of Washington
- In office 1971
- Preceded by: William James Lindberg
- Succeeded by: William T. Beeks

Judge of the United States District Court for the Western District of Washington
- In office July 14, 1953 – October 30, 1971
- Appointed by: Dwight D. Eisenhower
- Preceded by: Charles H. Leavy
- Succeeded by: Morell Edward Sharp

Personal details
- Born: George Hugo Boldt; December 28, 1903 Chicago, Illinois, US
- Died: March 18, 1984 (aged 80) Lakewood, Washington, US
- Education: University of Montana (BA, LLB)

George Hugo Boldt (December 28, 1903 – March 18, 1984) was a United States district judge of the United States District Court for the Western District of Washington and lived in Tacoma, Washington.

== Education and career ==
Born in Chicago, Boldt received a Bachelor of Arts from University of Montana in 1925 and a Bachelor of Laws from the Alexander Blewett III School of Law at the University of Montana in 1926. Boldt was a lifelong member of the Sigma Chi fraternity and served as a Grand Trustee for 6 years, from 1957 to 1963. He was in private practice of law in Helena, Montana, from 1926 to 1927. He was in private practice of law in Seattle, Washington, from 1928 to 1945. He was in the United States Army as a lieutenant colonel from 1942 to 1945. He was a state special deputy attorney general of Washington in 1940 and from 1946 to 1947. He was in private practice of law in Tacoma, Washington, from 1946 to 1953. He was a special prosecuting attorney of Pierce County, Washington, from 1948 to 1949.

== Federal judicial service ==
Boldt was nominated by President Dwight D. Eisenhower on June 10, 1953, to a seat on the United States District Court for the Western District of Washington vacated by Judge Charles H. Leavy. He was confirmed by the United States Senate on July 14, 1953, and received his commission the same day. He served as Chief Judge in 1971. He assumed senior status on October 30, 1971. His service was terminated on March 18, 1984, due to his death.

=== Notable cases ===
Boldt's most notable (as well as controversial) decision was his opinion in United States v. Washington (1974), which upheld tribal fishing rights under several treaties.

Another notable case was the Seattle Conspiracy Trial (Seattle 7, November–December 1970). In this case, a major federal prosecution of anti-Vietnam War activists, the government's case collapsed when its star witness admitted under cross-examination that he "would lie to get" the defendants. Boldt declared a mistrial and sentenced the defendants to up to a year in prison for contempt of court.

== Other service ==
On October 22, 1971, President Richard Nixon appointed Boldt chairman of the Pay Board, an agency established within the Executive Office of the President of the United States under the Economic Stabilization Act of 1970.

== Death and legacy ==
Boldt suffered from Alzheimer's disease during his final years, and died on March 18, 1984, at the Veteran's home in Lakewood, Washington, survived by his wife, three children, eight grandchildren and a great-grandchild. A decade after his death, tribes excluded from his ruling unsuccessfully sought to access his medical records to determine whether he suffered from the disease while he oversaw the fishing rights case. The tribes celebrated the 40th anniversary of his fishing rights ruling in February 2014.

== Sources ==
Legal offices
Preceded by Charles H. Leavy	Judge of the United States District Court for the Western District of Washington; 1953–1971	Succeeded by Morell Edward Sharp
Preceded by William James Lindberg	Chief Judge of the United States District Court for the Western District of Washington; 1971	Succeeded by William T. Beeks
