= John C. Coughenour =

American judge (born 1941)

Senior Judge of the United States District Court for the Western District of Washington
- Incumbent
- Assumed office July 27, 2006

Chief Judge of the United States District Court for the Western District of Washington
- In office 1997–2004
- Preceded by: Carolyn R. Dimmick
- Succeeded by: Robert S. Lasnik

Judge of the United States District Court for the Western District of Washington
- In office September 28, 1981 – July 27, 2006
- Appointed by: Ronald Reagan
- Preceded by: Morell Edward Sharp
- Succeeded by: Richard A. Jones

Personal details
- Born: John Clare Coughenour; July 27, 1941 (age 85) Pittsburg, Kansas, U.S.
- Education: Pittsburg State University (BS); University of Iowa (JD)

John Clare Coughenour (born July 27, 1941) is a senior United States district judge of the United States District Court for the Western District of Washington. He has taught trial and appellate practice at the University of Washington School of Law.

== Education and career ==
Coughenour was born in Pittsburg, Kansas. He received a Bachelor of Science degree from Kansas State College of Pittsburg in 1963. He received a Juris Doctor from the University of Iowa College of Law in 1966. Coughenour entered private practice in Seattle, Washington, in 1966. He was an assistant professor of law at the University of Washington from 1970 to 1973.

=== Federal judicial service ===
Coughenour was nominated by President Ronald Reagan on August 11, 1981, to a seat on the United States District Court for the Western District of Washington, vacated by Judge Morell Edward Sharp. He was confirmed by the United States Senate on September 25, 1981, and received commission on September 28, 1981. He served as chief judge from 1997 to 2004. He assumed senior status on July 27, 2006.

Coughenour testified before the Senate Judiciary Committee on April 7, 2004, and June 4, 2008.

Coughenour has opposed federal mandatory minimum sentences for a variety of crimes. He also frequently visited individuals in prison to better understand the system and effects of mandatory minimums.

=== Notable cases ===
==== Sexual predator law ====
In 1995, Coughenour found Washington State's Sexually Violent Predator Law to be "criminal in nature". He ruled the law unconstitutionally violated protections against ex post facto laws and double jeopardy.

==== Ahmed Ressam case ====
Coughenour was the judge who first sentenced Ahmed Ressam, the "millennium bomber", who planned to blow up Los Angeles International Airport on New Year's Eve 1999.

Coughenour wrote an op-ed in The New York Times entitled "How to Try a Terrorist", commenting on Michael B. Mukasey's nomination for Attorney General of the United States. Coughenour compared his experience in trying Ahmed Ressam with Michael B. Mukasey's trial of Omar Abdel Rahman for his role in the 1993 World Trade Center bombing. He noted that Mukasey had complained about "the inadequacy of the current approach to terrorism prosecutions." He noted that Mukasey had complained about the limited number of terrorism convictions. Coughenour paraphrased Mukasey: "Open prosecutions… potentially disclose to our enemies methods and sources of intelligence-gathering. Our Constitution does not adequately protect society from 'people who have cosmic goals that they are intent on achieving by cataclysmic means.'" Coughenour wrote that his experience: "only strengthened my conviction that American courts, guided by the principles of our Constitution, are fully capable of trying suspected terrorists."

Reversal, and remand to different judge

On July 27, 2005, Coughenour sentenced Ressam to 22 years in prison plus 5 years of supervision after his release. On February 2, 2010, the U.S. Ninth Circuit Court of Appeals ruled that the 22-year sentence Coughenour had handed down was too lenient and did not fit in the then mandatory sentencing guidelines, which indicated Ressam should have received at least 65 years and up to 130 years in prison. The court ordered that Ressam be resentenced by a different district court judge from Coughenour. An en banc panel of the Ninth Circuit subsequently reconsidered the 2010 opinion. The en banc panel agreed that the 22-year sentence was too lenient but refused to remand the case to a different judge, instead sending the case back to Judge Coughenour. On remand, Judge Coughenour sentenced Ressam to 37 years imprisonment to be followed by 5 years of supervised release. The Obama Administration did not appeal the sentence.

==== Jason Scott case ====
In 1995, Coughenour presided over the civil trial of the Jason Scott case, which resulted in damages awarded against the Cult Awareness Network and deprogrammer Rick Ross.

==== Birthright citizenship ====
On January 23, 2025, Coughenour became the first federal judge in the United States to temporarily block President Donald Trump's executive order ending birthright citizenship, siding with the states of Arizona, Illinois, Oregon, and Washington. Coughenour called the order "blatantly unconstitutional." On February 6, 2025, he granted a preliminary injunction enjoining enforcement of the order.

Legal offices
Preceded by Morell Edward Sharp	Judge of the United States District Court for the Western District of Washington; 1981–2006	Succeeded by Richard A. Jones
Preceded by Carolyn R. Dimmick	Chief Judge of the United States District Court for the Western District of Washington; 1997–2004	Succeeded by Robert S. Lasnik
