= Ricardo S. Martinez =

American judge (born 1951)

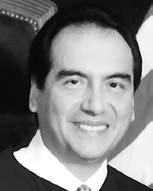

Senior Judge of the United States District Court for the Western District of Washington
- Incumbent
- Assumed office September 5, 2022

Chief Judge of the United States District Court for the Western District of Washington
- In office February 6, 2016 – September 3, 2022
- Preceded by: Marsha J. Pechman
- Succeeded by: David Estudillo

Judge of the United States District Court for the Western District of Washington
- In office June 16, 2004 – September 5, 2022
- Appointed by: George W. Bush
- Preceded by: Seat established by 104 Stat. 5089
- Succeeded by: Kymberly Evanson

Magistrate Judge of the United States District Court for the Western District of Washington
- In office 1998–2004

Judge of the King County Superior Court
- In office 1990–1998

Personal details
- Born: Ricardo Salazar Martinez; June 23, 1951 (age 75) Mercedes, Texas, U.S.
- Education: University of Washington (BS, JD)

Ricardo Salazar Martinez (born June 23, 1951) is an American attorney serving as the Senior United States district judge of the United States District Court for the Western District of Washington.

== Early life and education ==
Martinez was born in Mercedes, Texas, and raised in Whatcom County, Washington, where he graduated from Lynden High School. He received a Bachelor of Science degree from the University of Washington in 1975 and a Juris Doctor from the University of Washington School of Law in 1980. He was an Assistant Prosecutor with the King County Prosecuting Attorney's Office in King County, Washington, from 1980 to 1990.

== Career ==
=== King County Superior Court Judge ===
Martinez was a judge on the King County Superior Court from 1990 to 1998.

=== Federal judicial service ===
From 1998 to 2004, he served as a United States magistrate judge of the United States District Court for the Western District of Washington.

On October 14, 2003, Martinez was nominated by President George W. Bush to a new seat on the United States District Court for the Western District of Washington established by 104 Stat. 5089 following the appointment of Barbara Jacobs Rothstein as Director of the Federal Judicial Center. Martinez was confirmed by the United States Senate on June 15, 2004, receiving his commission on June 16, 2004. He is the first Latino judge in the Western District of Washington. He served as the Chief Judge from February 6, 2016 to September 3, 2022. He assumed senior status on September 5, 2022.

=== Notable cases ===
In one of these cases as a King County Superior Court judge, Martinez oversaw the trial of convicted murderer Cal Brown, whom he sentenced to the death penalty for the 1991 carjacking, rape and murder of Holly Washa. Brown was executed on September 10, 2010, therefore becoming the last person executed in Washington after the state abolished capital punishment in 2023.

During his tenure as a federal judge, Backpage, a classified advertising website specializing in online escort services, filed a lawsuit against the state of Washington to prevent a law that would require companies to verify the ages of people in sex-related advertisements. The online escort service claimed, "Backpage and Internet Archive argue the new law violates the Communications Decency Act of 1996, as well as the First, Fifth, and Fourteenth Amendments and the commerce clause of the U.S. Constitution." On 28 July 2012, Judge Martinez granted an injunction preventing the law from taking effect. In his ruling, Martinez found merit in some of Backpage.com's arguments that the state law would conflict with existing federal law.

== See also ==
- List of Hispanic and Latino American jurists
- List of first minority male lawyers and judges in Washington

Legal offices
Preceded by Seat established by 104 Stat. 5089	Judge of the United States District Court for the Western District of Washington; 2004–2022	Succeeded by Kymberly Evanson
Preceded by Marsha J. Pechman	Chief Judge of the United States District Court for the Western District of Washington; 2016–2022	Succeeded by David Estudillo
