= David Estudillo =

American judge (born 1973)

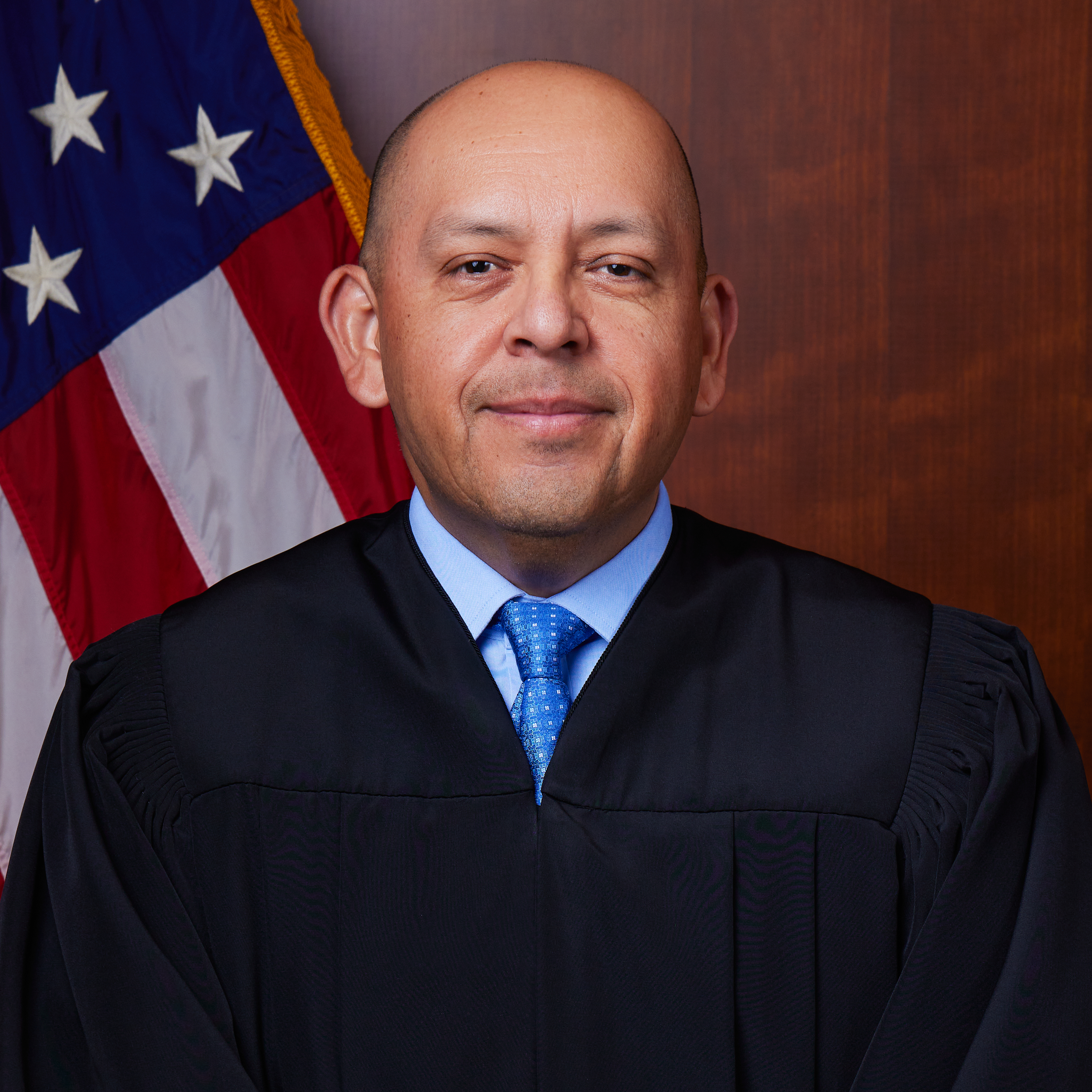

Chief Judge of the United States District Court for the Western District of Washington
- Incumbent
- Assumed office September 3, 2022
- Preceded by: Ricardo S. Martinez

Judge of the United States District Court for the Western District of Washington
- Incumbent
- Assumed office October 7, 2021
- Appointed by: Joe Biden
- Preceded by: Ronald B. Leighton

Personal details
- Born: David Gonzalez Estudillo; 1973 (age 52–53) Sunnyside, Washington, U.S.
- Education: University of Washington (BA, JD)

David Gonzalez Estudillo (born 1973) is an American lawyer serving as the chief United States district judge of the United States District Court for the Western District of Washington. He is a former Washington state court judge.

== Early life and education ==
Estudillo was born and raised in Sunnyside, Washington, where his parents owned a small grocery store. He received a Bachelor of Arts from the University of Washington in 1996 and a Juris Doctor from the University of Washington School of Law in 1999.

== Career ==
After graduating law school, Estudillo began his legal career at Jeffers, Danielson, Sonn & Aylward in Wenatchee. From 2002 to 2005, he was an attorney with Scheer and Zehnder in the Seattle office, where his practice focused on complex civil litigation. From 2005 to 2015, he was a solo practitioner at Estudillo Law Firm PLLC, where he focused on immigration law and general civil litigation. The firm represented detained and non-detained clients before the Executive Office for Immigration Review and Board of Immigration Appeals. He also represented people seeking immigration benefits through applications filed with United States Citizenship and Immigration Services. In 2015, he was appointed by Washington Governor Jay Inslee to serve as a judge for the Grant County Superior Court from September 1, 2015, until his elevation as a federal judge in 2021, preceded by Evan Sperline and succeeded by Anna Gigliotti.

=== Federal judicial service ===
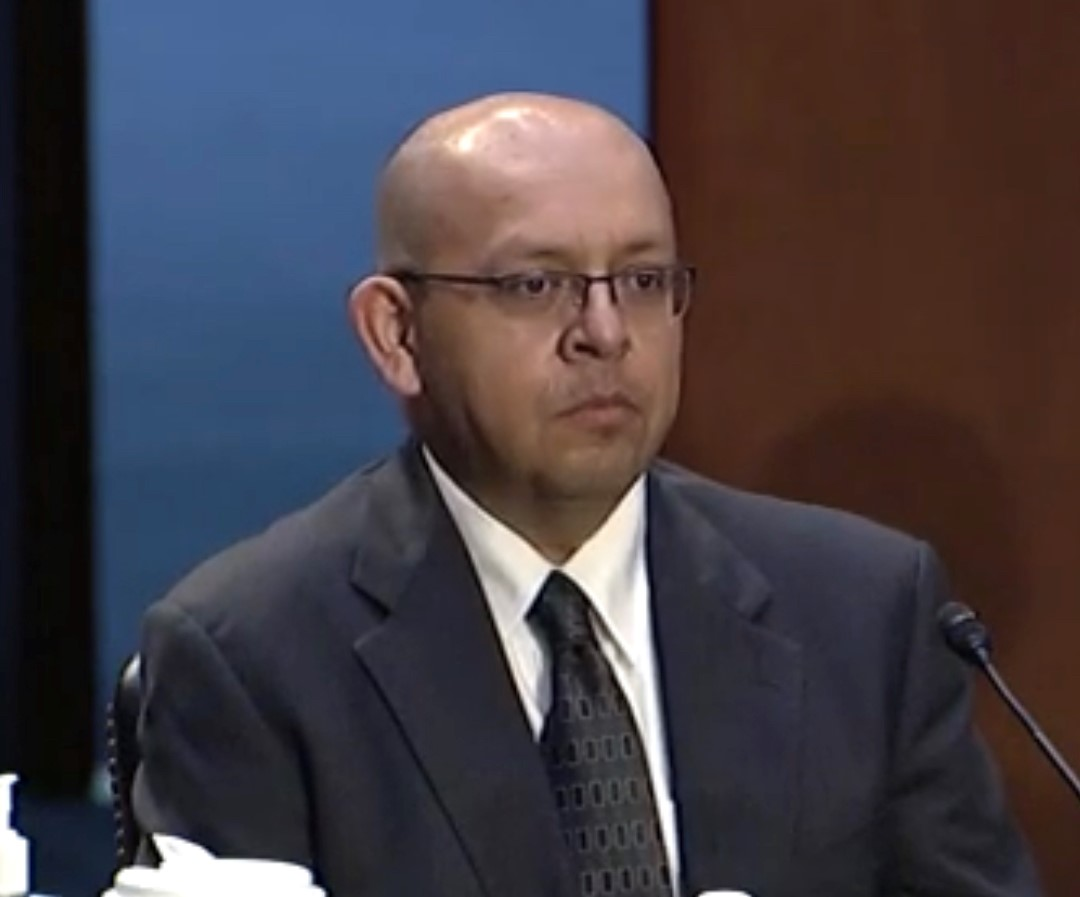
Estudillo during his hearing with the Senate Judiciary Committee

On April 29, 2021, President Joe Biden nominated Estudillo to serve as a United States district judge for the United States District Court for the Western District of Washington to the seat vacated by Judge Ronald B. Leighton, who assumed senior status on February 28, 2019. On June 9, 2021, a hearing on his nomination was held before the Senate Judiciary Committee. On July 15, 2021, his nomination was reported out of committee by a 15–7 vote. On September 14, 2021, the Senate invoked cloture on his nomination by a 52–42 vote. Later that day, his nomination was confirmed by a 54–41 vote. He received his judicial commission on October 7, 2021. He was sworn in on October 15, 2021. He became the chief judge on September 3, 2022, succeeding Ricardo S. Martinez.

== See also ==
- List of Hispanic and Latino American jurists

Legal offices
Preceded by Ronald B. Leighton	Judge of the United States District Court for the Western District of Washington; 2021–present	Incumbent
Preceded by Ricardo S. Martinez	Chief Judge of the United States District Court for the Western District of Washington; 2022–present	Incumbent
