= Barbara Jacobs Rothstein =

American judge (born 1939)

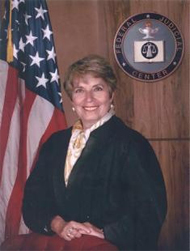

Senior Judge of the United States District Court for the Western District of Washington
- Incumbent
- Assumed office September 1, 2011

Chief Judge of the United States District Court for the Western District of Washington
- In office 1987–1994
- Preceded by: Walter T. McGovern
- Succeeded by: Carolyn R. Dimmick

Judge of the United States District Court for the Western District of Washington
- In office February 20, 1980 – September 1, 2011
- Appointed by: Jimmy Carter
- Preceded by: Seat established by 92 Stat. 1629
- Succeeded by: Seat abolished

Personal details
- Born: 1939 (age 86–87) Brooklyn, New York, U.S.
- Education: Cornell University (BA); Harvard University (LLB)

Barbara Jacobs Rothstein (born 1939) is a senior United States district judge of the United States District Court for the Western District of Washington.

== Biography ==
Born in Brooklyn, Rothstein received a Bachelor of Arts degree from Cornell University in 1960 and a Bachelor of Laws from Harvard Law School in 1966. She was in private practice in Boston, Massachusetts from 1966 to 1968. She worked for the Washington State Attorney General's Office from 1968 to 1977, where she worked as assistant attorney general and chief trial attorney for the Consumer Protection and Antitrust Division. She was also an adjunct professor at the University of Washington Law School from 1975 to 1977. She was a judge of the Superior Court of Washington in King County, Washington from 1977 to 1980.

=== Federal judicial service ===
On December 3, 1979, Rothstein was nominated by President Jimmy Carter to a new seat on the United States District Court for the Western District of Washington created by 92 Stat. 1629. She had been recommended to Carter by Senators Henry M. Jackson and Warren Magnuson, who had "decided to use a merit commission to select the appointment rather than the usual method of selecting through the political process". She was confirmed by the United States Senate on February 20, 1980, and received her commission the same day. She served as Chief Judge from 1987 to 1994. From 2003 to 2011, she was the Director of the Federal Judicial Center. She assumed senior status on September 1, 2011, and is currently serving by designation on the United States District Court for the District of Columbia.

=== Notable cases ===
In February 2020, Rothstein, sitting by designation with the United States Court of Appeals for the Eleventh Circuit in Florida, was a member of a 3-judge panel in Jones et al. v. DeSantis, a 2020 voting rights case. 2018 Florida Amendment 4 permitted former felons to vote, however DeSantis signed a law that required former felons to pay all legal fees before being eligible to vote again, despite some of them not knowing how much they owed. District judge Robert Hinkle struck down that law, and the panel kept the injunction against the law. However, the panel was reversed in a sharply divided en banc decision that September.

In August 2025, Rothstein tossed many conditions the Trump administration tried to impose on existing grants, which included not using the funds for abortion, DEI, or "gender ideology", as well as requirements that the grant recipients cooperate with ICE. Rothstein ruled that Congress, not the president, holds the power to set conditions on federal funding.

== Personal life ==
In January 1969, Rothstein married Ted L. Rothstein, a Seattle-based neurologist with whom she had one child.

== See also ==
- List of Jewish American jurists
- List of United States federal judges by longevity of service

Legal offices
New seat	Judge of the United States District Court for the Western District of Washington; 1980–2011	Succeeded by seat abolished
Preceded by Walter T. McGovern	Chief Judge of the United States District Court for the Western District of Washington; 1987–1994	Succeeded by Carolyn R. Dimmick
