= Robert S. Lasnik =

American judge (born 1951)

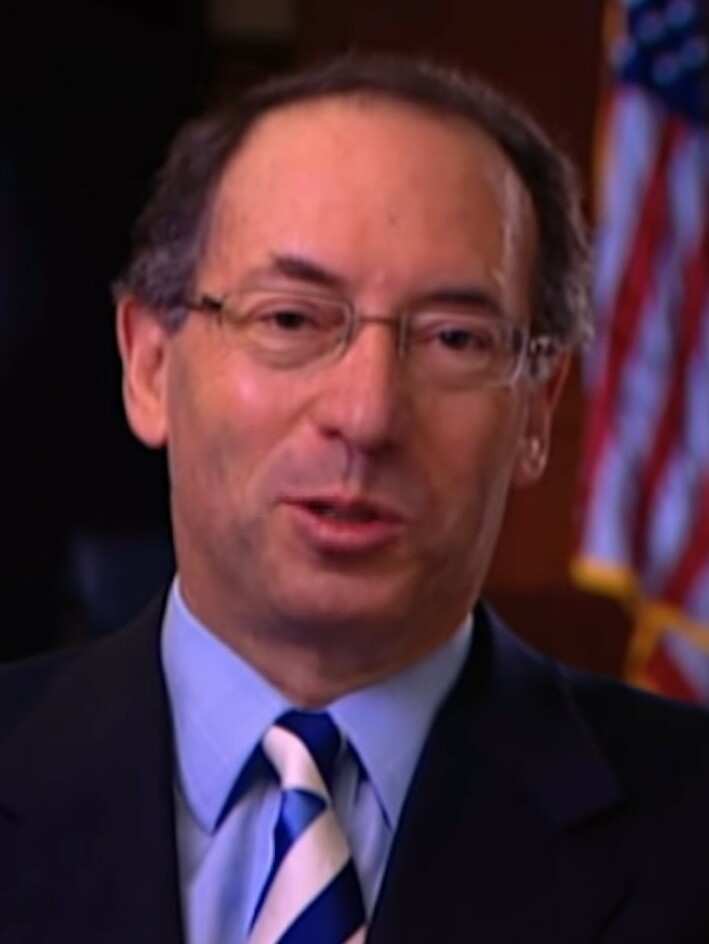
- Lasnik in 2014

Senior Judge of the United States District Court for the Western District of Washington
- Incumbent
- Assumed office January 27, 2016

Chief Judge of the United States District Court for the Western District of Washington
- In office 2004–2011
- Preceded by: John C. Coughenour
- Succeeded by: Marsha J. Pechman

Judge of the United States District Court for the Western District of Washington
- In office October 22, 1998 – January 27, 2016
- Appointed by: Bill Clinton
- Preceded by: Carolyn R. Dimmick
- Succeeded by: Lauren J. King

Personal details
- Born: January 27, 1951 (age 75) Staten Island, New York, U.S.
- Education: Brandeis University (AB); Northwestern University (MS, MA); University of Washington (JD)

Robert Stephen Lasnik (born January 27, 1951) is an American attorney and jurist, who serves as a senior United States district judge of the United States District Court for the Western District of Washington.

== Education and career ==
Lasnik was born in Staten Island, New York. He received an Artium Baccalaureus degree from Brandeis University in 1972 and a Master of Science in journalism from Northwestern University in 1973, a Master of Arts in counseling also from Northwestern University in 1974, and a Juris Doctor from the University of Washington School of Law in 1978.

From 1978 to 1990, Lasnik worked in the office of the King County Prosecuting Attorney, including five years as a deputy prosecutor (from 1978 to 1981), two years as a senior deputy prosecutor (from 1981 to 1983), and seven years as chief of staff to longtime King County Prosecutor Norm Maleng (from 1983 to 1990). In his time with the King County Prosecuting Attorney's office, Lasnik prosecuted a number of high-profile cases, many with future King County Superior Court Judge William L. Downing. The pair prosecuted three cases stemming from the Wah Mee Massacre, the infamous 1983 robbery-homicide that ended in the murder of thirteen employees and patrons of the Wah Mee Club in Seattle's International District. Lasnik and Downing also successfully prosecuted David Lewis Rice, who on Christmas Eve in 1986 murdered all four members of a prominent Seattle family based on the mistaken belief they were part of a Jewish-communist conspiracy.

Lasnik served as a superior court judge on the King County Superior Court from 1990 to 1998. While on the Superior Court bench, Lasnik made important rulings involving the Seattle Mariners' stadium and in 1995 ruled that the University of Washington regents violated the Open Meetings Act in their search for a new president.

=== Federal judicial service ===
Lasnik was nominated to the United States District Court for the Western District of Washington by President Bill Clinton on May 11, 1998, to a seat vacated by Carolyn R. Dimmick. He was confirmed by the United States Senate on October 21, 1998, and received his commission on October 22, 1998. He served as chief judge from 2004 to 2011. He assumed senior status on January 27, 2016.

==== Notable cases ====
===== Chamber of Commerce v. City of Seattle (2017) =====
Judge Lasnik temporarily blocked Seattle's first-in-the-nation law allowing drivers for a ridesharing company, such as Uber and Lyft, to unionize over pay and working conditions. In August 2017, Lasnik then determined that the city had state action immunity for the alleged violations of the Sherman Antitrust Act. That judgment was partially reversed by a unanimous panel of the United States Court of Appeals for the Ninth Circuit in May 2018.

===== State of Washington v. U.S. Dept. of State (2018) =====
On August 27, 2018, Judge Lasnik blocked the Defense Distributed and its founder, Cody Wilson, from posting 3D-printed gun blueprints online. Judge Lasnik first imposed a temporary restraining order on Wilson, but that was due to expire, so he mandated a preliminary injunction that blocks online distribution in the United States while the legal proceedings are ongoing. The case was filed by 8 State attorneys general against the US State Department and Defense Distributed to block the implementation of a settlement between them which would allow the company to publish and sell downloadable blueprints for 3-D guns online.

===== Soto Palmer v. Hobbs =====
In August 2023, Judge Lasnik ruled that Washington State legislative District 15 in the Yakima Valley portion of Central Washington as it was drawn by the Washington State Redistricting Commission in 2021 violated the Voting Rights Act of 1965 (VRA). In his ruling, he called for the state legislature to reconvene the Redistricting Commission to draw new maps that complied with the ruling, otherwise the court would take over the process of drawing new maps.

The state legislature declined to call a special session to reconvene the Redistricting Commission, so Judge Lasnik ordered the plaintiffs to produce maps that would comply with his ruling and appointed a special master to assist the court in evaluating the maps. The plaintiffs submitted 5 different map proposals for the court to consider. Experts hired by both the plaintiffs and defendants gave testimony detailing their analysis of the proposed maps with Republican experts arguing the maps were an unconstitutional racial gerrymander and Democratic experts encouraging the court to adopt one of the maps. The Yakima Nation also provided testimony asking the court to ensure the new district boundaries kept as much of their on and off reservation land in one district as possible. On March 15, 2024, Judge Lasnik approved new legislative districts to be used in subsequent state legislative elections based on a modified version of one of the plaintiffs proposals.

The ruling was criticized by Republican lawmakers in Washington who requested a stay from the 9th Circuit and subsequently the Supreme Court pending their appeal. On March 22, the 9th Circuit denied their attempt to stay Judge Lasnik's decision and on April 3, 2024, the Supreme Court also denied their request for a stay ensuring the new maps would be used for elections in 2024. In August 2025, in an opinion written by Judge Margaret McKeown, the three judge panel for the 9th Circuit upheld both Judge Lasnik's ruling that the original maps violated the VRA and the new maps put in place by Judge Lasnik. The intervenor defendants have not filed an appeal with the US Supreme Court.

== See also ==
- List of Jewish American jurists

== Sources ==
Legal offices
| Preceded by Carolyn R. Dimmick | Judge of the United States District Court for the Western District of Washington; 1998–2016 | Succeeded by Lauren J. King |
| Preceded by John C. Coughenour | Chief Judge of the United States District Court for the Western District of Washington; 2004–2011 | Succeeded by Marsha J. Pechman |
