= Richard A. Jones =

American judge (born 1950)

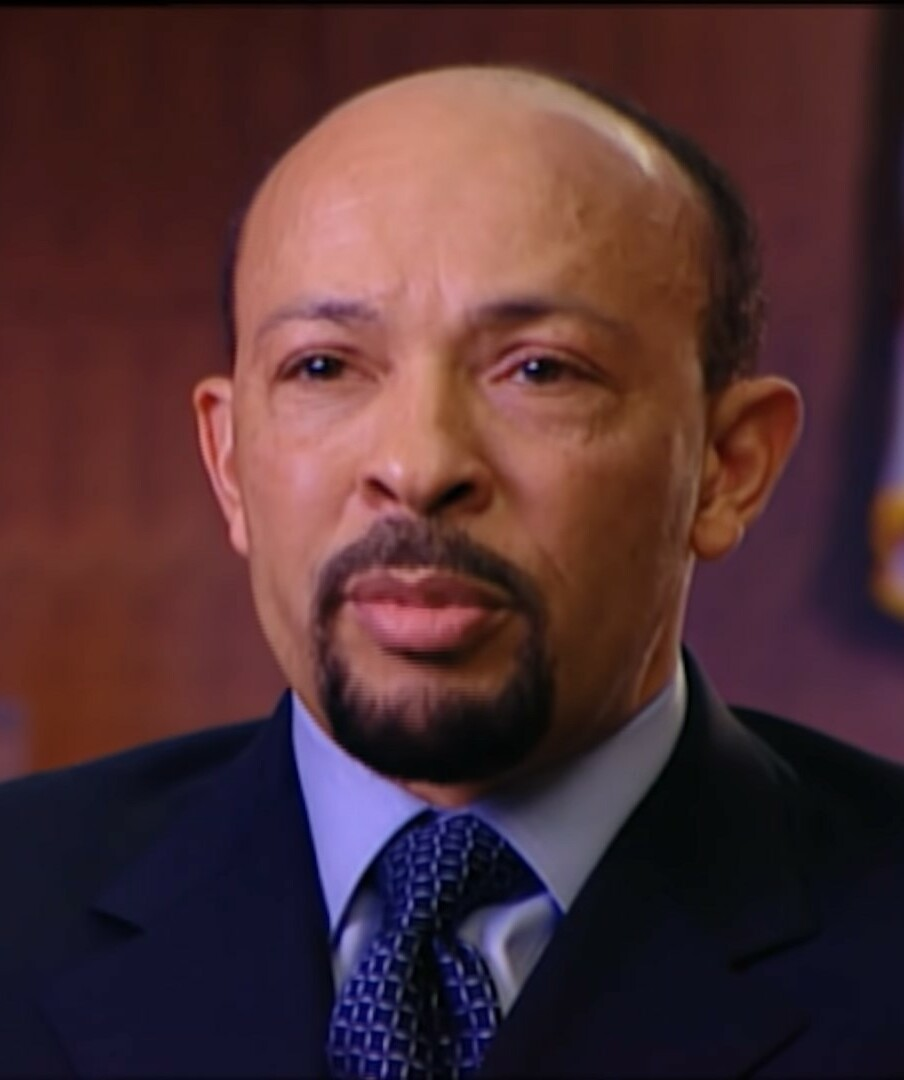
- Jones in 2014

Senior Judge of the United States District Court for the Western District of Washington
- Incumbent
- Assumed office September 5, 2022

Judge of the United States District Court for the Western District of Washington
- In office October 29, 2007 – September 5, 2022
- Appointed by: George W. Bush
- Preceded by: John C. Coughenour
- Succeeded by: Jamal Whitehead

Judge of the King County Superior Court
- In office 1994–2007

Personal details
- Born: Richard Anthony Jones; 1950 (age 75–76) Seattle, Washington, U.S.
- Spouse: Leslie Jones
- Relatives: Quincy Jones (half-brother); Quincy Jones III (nephew); Kidada Jones (niece); Rashida Jones (niece); Kenya Kinski-Jones (niece)
- Education: Seattle University (BPA); University of Washington (JD)

Richard Anthony Jones (born 1950) is an American attorney and jurist serving as a senior United States district judge of the United States District Court for the Western District of Washington. He previously served as a deputy prosecuting attorney for King County, Washington, attorney for the Port of Seattle, and assistant United States attorney in the region, in addition to private practice.

== Early life and education ==
Born in Seattle in 1950, Jones is the son of Quincy Delight Jones Sr., who worked as a semi-professional baseball player and carpenter, and his second wife. He is 17 years younger than his half-brother Quincy Jones, a musician and producer.

After attending Seattle public schools, Richard Jones received a Bachelor of Public Administration degree from Seattle University in 1972 and a Juris Doctor from the University of Washington School of Law in 1975. He was admitted to the Washington State Bar Association in 1977.

== Career ==
Jones was a community liaison officer, Office of King County Prosecuting Attorney, Washington from 1975 to 1977. He was a deputy prosecuting attorney of the Office of King County Prosecuting Attorney from 1977 to 1978. He was a staff attorney of the Port of Seattle from 1978 to 1983.

After being in private practice with the major law firm of Bogle & Gates in Seattle from 1983 to 1988, he became an Assistant United States Attorney of the United States Attorney's Office, Western District of Washington. He served there from 1988 to 1994.

=== Judicial service ===
Jones served as a judge on the King County Superior Court, Washington from 1994 to 2007. During this period, he presided over several high-profile cases, including the prosecution of Gary Ridgway, the notorious "Green River Killer" who was known to have killed 48 women.

Jones was recommended by a bipartisan panel in Washington and nominated by President George W. Bush on March 19, 2007, to a seat vacated by John C. Coughenour. He was confirmed by the United States Senate on October 4, 2007, and received his commission on October 29, 2007. He assumed senior status on September 5, 2022.

In April 2024, Jones sentenced Changpeng Zhao, founder of the cryptocurrency exchange Binance, to only four months in prison over Zhao's guilty plea to money laundering charges, despite federal prosecutors seeking a three-year term. Dennis Kelleher of the non-profit Better Markets criticized the sentence as insufficient to dissuade similar corporate behavior.

==== Privacy/surveillance ====
Some of Jones's decisions expanding state surveillance powers have been controversial, including one in 2017 to allow unfettered warrantless camera surveillance by the City of Seattle by barring the public release, in response to a public records request, of information regarding cameras installed by the FBI. In a 2016 case also narrowing the scope of a citizen's reasonable expectation of privacy, he ruled that users of the Tor anonymity network, the purpose of which is to provide privacy, do not have a reasonable expectation of privacy and was criticized for not understanding the technology.

== Personal ==
He is married to Leslie Jones, diversity program manager for Sound Transit. Jones has been active on the board of the YMCA. He also acts as a mentor to minority youth in Seattle.

== See also ==
- List of African-American federal judges
- List of African-American jurists

Legal offices
Preceded by John C. Coughenour	Judge of the United States District Court for the Western District of Washington; 2007–2022	Succeeded by Jamal Whitehead
