= Carolyn R. Dimmick =

American judge (1929–2025)

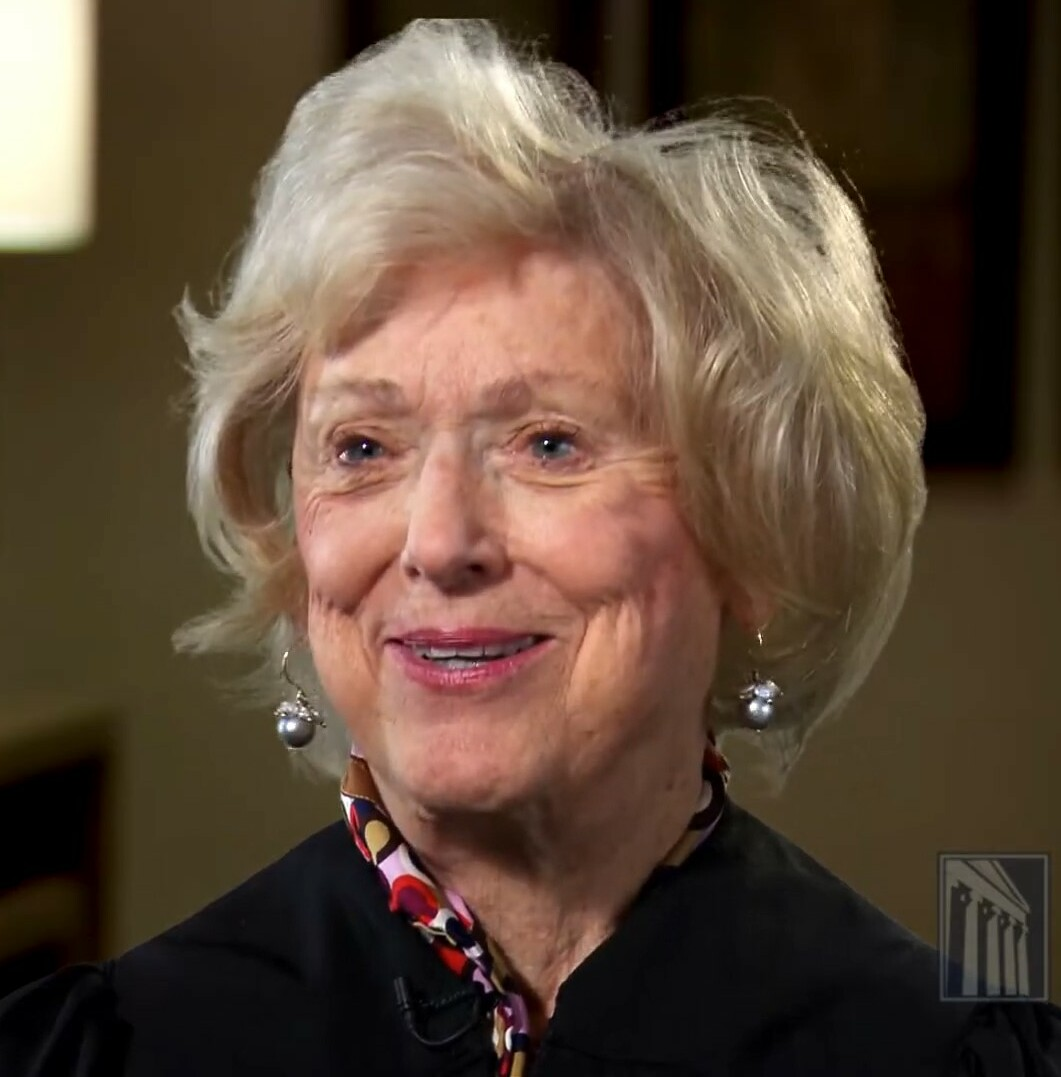
- Dimmick in 2018

Senior Judge of the United States District Court for the Western District of Washington
- In office November 1, 1997 – December 24, 2025

Chief Judge of the United States District Court for the Western District of Washington
- In office 1994–1997
- Preceded by: Barbara Jacobs Rothstein
- Succeeded by: John C. Coughenour

Judge of the United States District Court for the Western District of Washington
- In office April 4, 1985 – November 1, 1997
- Appointed by: Ronald Reagan
- Preceded by: Seat established by 98 Stat. 333
- Succeeded by: Robert S. Lasnik

Justice of the Washington Supreme Court
- In office 1981–1985
- Preceded by: Charles T. Wright

Personal details
- Born: October 24, 1929 Seattle, Washington, U.S.
- Died: December 24, 2025 (aged 96) Seattle, Washington, U.S.
- Education: University of Washington (BA, JD)

Carolyn Joyce Reaber Dimmick (October 24, 1929 – December 24, 2025) was a United States district judge of the United States District Court for the Western District of Washington.

== Life and career ==
Dimmick was born in Seattle on October 24, 1929. She received a Bachelor of Arts degree from the University of Washington in 1951 and a Juris Doctor from the University of Washington School of Law in 1953. She was an assistant state attorney general of Washington from 1953 to 1954, and was a deputy prosecuting attorney of King County, Washington from 1955 to 1959 and from 1960 to 1962. She was in private practice of law in Seattle from 1959 to 1960 and again from 1962 to 1965. She was a state court judge on the Northeast District Court, King County, Washington from 1965 to 1975, then a superior court judge of the King County Superior Court from 1976 to 1980, and finally a justice of the Washington Supreme Court from 1981 to 1985. She was the first woman to sit on the Washington Supreme Court and only the fourteenth woman on state courts of last resort in the United States.

=== Federal judicial service ===
Dimmick was nominated by President Ronald Reagan on March 7, 1985, to a new seat on the United States District Court for the Western District of Washington created by 98 Stat. 333. She was confirmed by the United States Senate on April 3, 1985, and received her commission on April 4, 1985. She was succeeded on the Washington Supreme Court by Barbara Durham, who then became the second woman to serve on that court. Dimmick served as chief judge from 1994 to 1997, assuming senior status on November 1, 1997.

Dimmick died on December 24, 2025, at the age of 96.

== See also ==
- List of female state supreme court justices

== Sources ==
- Senior Judge Carolyn Dimmick of the U.S. District Court for the Western District of Washington

Legal offices
Preceded by Seat established by 98 Stat. 333	Judge of the United States District Court for the Western District of Washington; 1985–1997	Succeeded by Robert S. Lasnik
Preceded by Barbara Jacobs Rothstein	Chief Judge of the United States District Court for the Western District of Washington; 1994–1997	Succeeded by John C. Coughenour
