= Robert Jensen Bryan =

American judge (born 1934)

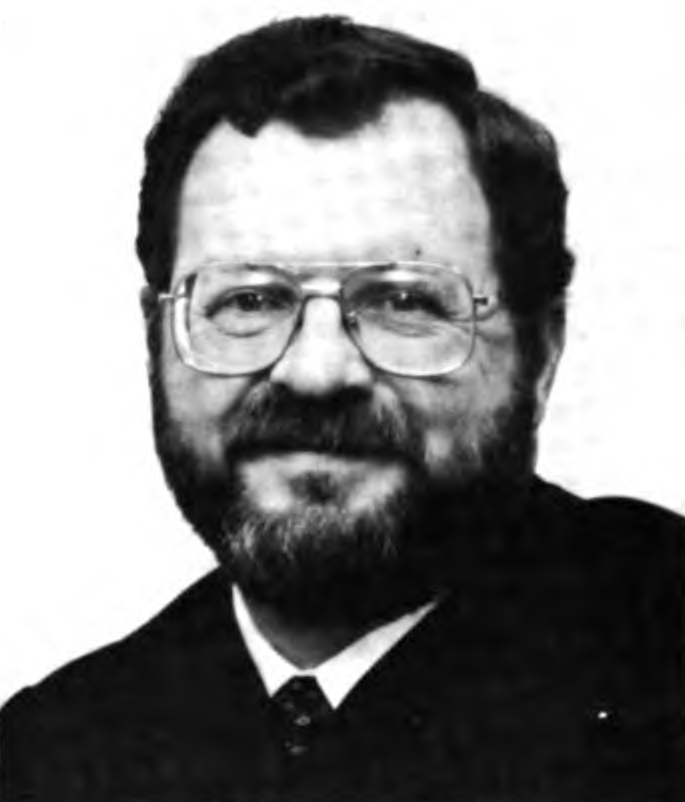

Senior Judge of the United States District Court for the Western District of Washington
- Incumbent
- Assumed office November 1, 2000

Judge of the United States District Court for the Western District of Washington
- In office May 7, 1986 – November 1, 2000
- Appointed by: Ronald Reagan
- Preceded by: Seat established by 98 Stat. 333
- Succeeded by: Ronald B. Leighton

Personal details
- Born: October 29, 1934 (age 91) Bremerton, Washington, U.S.
- Education: University of Washington (BA, JD)

Robert Jensen Bryan (born October 29, 1934) is a senior United States district judge of the United States District Court for the Western District of Washington.

== Education and career ==
Bryan was born in Bremerton, Washington. He was in the United States Army Reserve from 1955 to 1957, and received a Bachelor of Arts degree from the University of Washington in 1956, where he was a member of the Delta Upsilon fraternity. He earned a Juris Doctor from the University of Washington School of Law in 1958. He was in private practice in Bremerton from 1959 to 1967. He was then a judge on the Superior Court of Washington from 1967 to 1984, including service as a judge pro tem, Washington State Court of Appeals in 1975 and as a judge pro tem on the Washington State Supreme Court from 1979 to 1982. He was in private practice in Seattle, Washington from 1984 to 1986.

=== Federal judicial service ===
On February 3, 1986, Bryan was nominated by President Ronald Reagan to a new seat on the United States District Court for the Western District of Washington created by 98 Stat. 333. He was confirmed by the United States Senate on April 24, 1986, and received his commission on May 7, 1986. He assumed senior status on November 1, 2000.

On August 30, 2021, Bryan dismissed a lawsuit challenging Washington's ban on conversion therapy for minors. The 9th circuit affirmed Bryan in September 2022, and the Supreme Court denied certiorari on December 11, 2023.

== Sources ==
Legal offices
Preceded by Seat established by 98 Stat. 333	Judge of the United States District Court for the Western District of Washington; 1986–2000	Succeeded by Ronald B. Leighton
