= United States District Court for the Western District of Washington =

United States federal district court in Washington (U.S. state)

Coordinates: 47.6153°N 122.3366°W

- (W.D. Wash.)
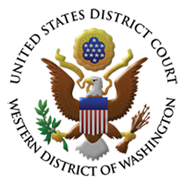

- Map of the court's jurisdiction by county
- Location: United States Courthouse (Seattle) More locations: Union Station (Tacoma); Mount Vernon
- Established: March 2, 1905
- Judges: 7
- Chief Judge: David Estudillo

Officers of the court
- U.S. Attorney: Roger Rogoff
- www.wawd.uscourts.gov

The United States District Court for the Western District of Washington (in case citations, W.D. Wash.) is the federal district court whose jurisdiction comprises the following counties of the state of Washington: Clallam, Clark, Cowlitz, Grays Harbor, Island, Jefferson, King, Kitsap, Lewis, Mason, Pacific, Pierce, San Juan, Skagit, Skamania, Snohomish, Thurston, Wahkiakum, and Whatcom. Its courthouse, built in 2004, is located at 7th and Stewart in Seattle.

As of the 2020 census, 6 million people resided in the Western District, representing 78% of the state's population. The district includes the cities of Bellingham, Bremerton, Seattle, Bellevue, Olympia, Vancouver, Everett, and Tacoma, amongst others.

The court is divided into two divisions by counties as follows:

Seattle Division - Island, King, San Juan, Skagit, Snohomish, Whatcom

Tacoma Division - Clallam, Clark, Cowlitz, Grays Harbor, Jefferson, Kitsap, Lewis, Mason, Pacific, Pierce, Skamania, Thurston, Wahkiakum

Cases from the Western District of Washington are appealed to the United States Court of Appeals for the Ninth Circuit (except for patent claims and claims against the U.S. government under the Tucker Act, which are appealed to the Federal Circuit).

The United States Attorney's Office for the Western District of Washington represents the United States in civil and criminal litigation in the court. As of July 15, 2026, the United States Attorney is Roger Rogoff.

== Current judges ==
As of December 24, 2025:

#	Title	Judge	Duty station	Born	Term of service			Appointed by
#	Title	Judge	Duty station	Born	Active	Chief	Senior	Appointed by
31	Chief Judge	David Estudillo	Tacoma	1973	2021–present	2022–present	—	Biden
32	District Judge	Tana Lin	Seattle	1966	2021–present	—	—	Biden
33	District Judge	Lauren J. King	Seattle	1982	2021–present	—	—	Biden
34	District Judge	John H. Chun	Seattle	1970	2022–present	—	—	Biden
35	District Judge	Jamal Whitehead	Seattle	1979	2023–present	—	—	Biden
36	District Judge	Kymberly Evanson	Seattle	1977	2023–present	—	—	Biden
37	District Judge	Tiffany Cartwright	Tacoma	1985	2023–present	—	—	Biden
17	Senior Judge	Barbara Jacobs Rothstein	Washington, D.C. (Note: Since taking senior status, Judge Rothstein has sat with the United States District Court for the District of Columbia.)	1939	1980–2011	1987–1994	2011–present	Carter
18	Senior Judge	John C. Coughenour	Seattle	1941	1981–2006	1997–2004	2006–present	Reagan
20	Senior Judge	Robert Jensen Bryan	Tacoma	1934	1986–2000	—	2000–present	Reagan
22	Senior Judge	Thomas Samuel Zilly	Seattle	1935	1988–2004	—	2004–present	Reagan
24	Senior Judge	Robert S. Lasnik	Seattle	1951	1998–2016	2004–2011	2016–present	Clinton
25	Senior Judge	Marsha J. Pechman	Seattle	1951	1999–2016	2011–2016	2016–present	Clinton
27	Senior Judge	Ricardo S. Martinez	Seattle	1951	2004–2022	2016–2022	2022–present	G.W. Bush
28	Senior Judge	James Robart	Seattle	1947	2004–2016	—	2016–present	G.W. Bush
29	Senior Judge	Benjamin Settle	Tacoma	1947	2007–2020	—	2020–present	G.W. Bush
30	Senior Judge	Richard A. Jones	Seattle	1950	2007–2022	—	2022–present	G.W. Bush

== Former judges ==
#	Judge	Born–died	Active service	Chief Judge	Senior status	Appointed by	Reason for termination
1	Cornelius H. Hanford	1849–1926	1905–1912 (Note: Reassigned from the District of Washington.)	—	—	B. Harrison/Operation of law	resignation
2	George Donworth	1861–1947	1909–1912	—	—	Taft	resignation
3	Edward E. Cushman	1865–1944	1912–1939	—	1939–1944	Taft	death
4	Clinton Woodbury Howard	1864–1937	1912–1913	—	—	Taft	not confirmed
5	Jeremiah Neterer	1862–1943	1913–1933	—	1933–1943	Wilson	death
6	John Clyde Bowen	1888–1978	1934–1961	1948–1959	1961–1978	F. Roosevelt	death
7	Lloyd Llewellyn Black	1889–1950	1939–1950 (Note: Jointly appointed to the Eastern and Western Districts of Washington.)	—	—	F. Roosevelt	death
8	Charles H. Leavy	1884–1952	1942–1952	—	1952	F. Roosevelt	death
9	William James Lindberg	1904–1981	1951–1971 (Note: From 1951 to 1961, Judge Lindberg was jointly appointed to the Eastern and Western Districts of Washington.)	1959–1971	1971–1981	Truman	death
10	George Hugo Boldt	1903–1984	1953–1971	1971	1971–1984	Eisenhower	death
11	William Trulock Beeks	1906–1988	1961–1973	1971–1973	1973–1988	Kennedy	death
12	William Nelson Goodwin	1909–1975	1966–1975	1973–1975	—	L. Johnson	death
13	Walter Thomas McGovern	1922–2021	1971–1987	1975–1987	1987–2021	Nixon	death
14	Morell Edward Sharp	1920–1980	1971–1980	—	—	Nixon	death
15	Donald S. Voorhees	1916–1989	1974–1986	—	1986–1989	Nixon	death
16	Jack Edward Tanner	1919–2006	1978–1991 (Note: In 1978, Judge Tanner was jointly appointed to the Eastern and Western Districts of Washington.)	—	1991–2006	Carter	death
19	Carolyn R. Dimmick	1929–2025	1985–1997	1994–1997	1997–2025	Reagan	death
21	William Lee Dwyer	1929–2002	1987–1998	—	1998–2002	Reagan	death
23	Frank Burgess	1935–2010	1994–2005	—	2005–2010	Clinton	death
26	Ronald B. Leighton	1951–present	2002–2019	—	2019–2020	G.W. Bush	retirement

== Chief judges ==
Chief judges have administrative responsibilities with respect to their district court. Unlike the Supreme Court, where one justice is specifically nominated to be chief, the office of chief judge rotates among the district court judges. To be chief, a judge must have been in active service on the court for at least one year, be under the age of 65, and have not previously served as chief judge.

A vacancy is filled by the judge highest in seniority among the group of qualified judges. The chief judge serves for a term of seven years, or until age 70, whichever occurs first. The age restrictions are waived if no members of the court would otherwise be qualified for the position.

When the office was created in 1948, the chief judge was the longest-serving judge who had not elected to retire, on what has since 1958 been known as senior status, or declined to serve as chief judge. After August 6, 1959, judges could not become or remain chief after turning 70 years old. The current rules have been in operation since October 1, 1982.

== Succession of seats ==
Seat 1
Seat reassigned from the District of Washington on March 2, 1905 by 33 Stat. 824
Hanford	1905–1912
Howard	1912–1913
Neterer	1913–1933
Bowen	1934–1961
Beeks	1961–1973
Voorhees	1974–1986
Dwyer	1987–1998
Pechman	1999–2016
Lin	2021–present

Seat 2
Seat established on March 2, 1909 by 35 Stat. 686
Donworth	1909–1912
Cushman	1912–1939
Leavy	1942–1952
Boldt	1953–1971
Sharp	1971–1980
Coughenour	1981–2006
Jones	2007–2022
Whitehead	2023–present

Seat 3
Seat established on May 31, 1938 by 52 Stat. 585
Seat made concurrent with Eastern District on January 20, 1940 by 54 Stat. 16
Black	1939–1950
Seat assigned solely to Western District on May 19, 1961 by 75 Stat. 80
Lindberg	1951–1971
McGovern	1971–1987
Zilly	1988–2004
Robart	2004–2016
Chun	2022–present

Seat 4
Seat established on May 19, 1961 by 75 Stat. 80 (concurrent with Eastern District)
Goodwin	1966–1975
Seat assigned solely to Western District on October 20, 1978 by 92 Stat. 1629
Tanner	1978–1991
Burgess	1994–2005
Settle	2007–2020
Cartwright	2023–present

Seat 5
Seat established on October 20, 1978 by 92 Stat. 1629
Rothstein	1980–2011
Seat abolished on September 1, 2011 (temporary judgeship expired)

Seat 6
Seat established on July 10, 1984 by 98 Stat. 333
Dimmick	1985–1997
Lasnik	1998–2016
King	2021–present

Seat 7
Seat established on July 10, 1984 by 98 Stat. 333 (temporary)
Seat made permanent on December 1, 1990 by 104 Stat. 5089
Bryan	1986–2000
Leighton	2002–2019
Estudillo	2021–present

Seat 8
Seat established on September 8, 2003 pursuant to 104 Stat. 5089 (temporary)
Seat became permanent upon the abolition of Seat 5 on September 1, 2011
Martinez	2004–2022
Evanson	2023–present

== See also ==
- Courts of Washington
- List of current United States district judges
- List of United States federal courthouses in Washington
