= K&L Gates =

American multinational law firm

K&L Gates LLP
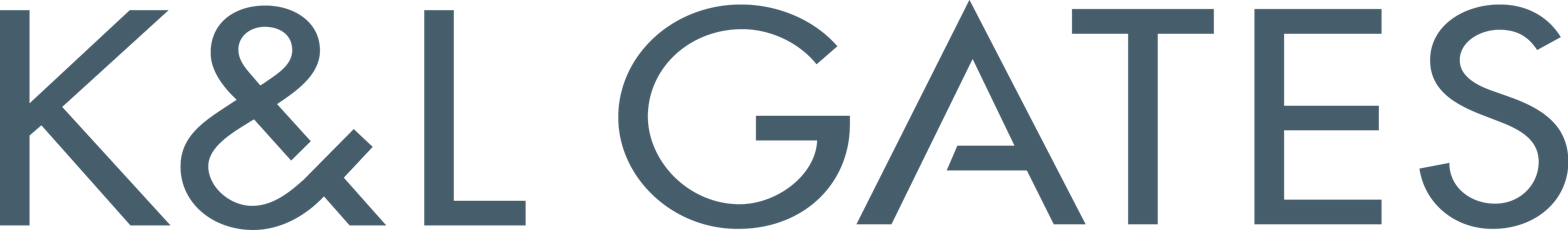
- Headquarters: K&L Gates Center; Pittsburgh, Pennsylvania, U.S.
- No. of offices: 47
- No. of attorneys: 1,696 (2026)
- Major practice areas: General practice
- Key people: James Segerdahl (global managing partner), Michael Caccese (chairman, management committee)
- Revenue: ▲US$ 1.37 billion (2026)
- Date founded: 1946 (Pittsburgh); 1883 (Seattle)
- Company type: Limited Liability Partnership
- Website: www.klgates.com

K&L Gates LLP is a multinational corporation law firm based in the United States, with international offices in Asia, Australia, Europe, the Middle East, and South America. Headquartered in Pittsburgh, the firm was formed in 2007 by the merger of the Pittsburgh-based law firm Kirkpatrick & Lockhart and the Seattle-based law firm Preston Gates & Ellis.

The firm delivers legal services at both an individual office level and through nine broad firmwide practice areas: Corporate and Transactional; Energy, Infrastructure and Resources; Finance; Financial Services; Intellectual Property; Labor, Employment and Workplace Safety; Litigation and Dispute Resolution; Real Estate; and Regulatory and Policy, each of which also include a number of subject matter and industry-based practice groups.

As of March 2017, the leaders of K&L Gates are James Segerdahl (global managing partner) and Michael Caccese (chairman, management committee).

== History ==
Harold Preston established a law office in Seattle in 1883, which eventually evolved into the firm Preston Gates & Ellis. Pittsburgh-based Kirkpatrick, Pomeroy, Lockhart & Johnson was founded in 1946.

In 2005, Kirkpatrick & Lockhart and Nicholson Graham & Jones, founded in 1858, merged to become Kirkpatrick & Lockhart Nicholson Graham. Two years later, on January 1, 2007, K&L Gates was formed through the merger between Kirkpatrick & Lockhart Nicholson Graham and Preston Gates & Ellis, resulting in the creation of Kirkpatrick & Lockhart Preston Gates Ellis. The name was later shortened to K&L Gates.

K&L Gates combined with Hughes & Luce, a Dallas-based firm in January 2008. In July of that year, the firm merged with Kennedy Covington Lobdell & Hickman LLP, a North Carolina–based firm.

On March 1, 2009, K&L Gates merged with Bell, Boyd & Lloyd, a Chicago-based firm with approximately 215 attorneys with offices in Chicago, San Diego and Washington, D.C.

In 2013, the firm merged with Australian national firm Middletons, which has offices in Melbourne, Sydney, Perth, and Brisbane.

== Ratings and rankings ==
U.S. News and World Report has given the firm "Tier 1" national ratings in 42 different practice areas, placing it in the top 3 law firms with the most Tier 1 rankings. The firm garnered 129 first-tier ratings at the regional/city level across 59 practice groups. Chambers has given the firm a tier 1 national ranking for its Shipping & Maritime Transportation practice, as well as regional tier 1 rankings in: Corporate/Commercial (WA), Environmental (NJ), Bankruptcy and Healthcare (NC), Insurance, Litigation and Corporate (PA).

As of 2024, K&L Gates is ranked #49 in the Top 100 "most prestigious law firms in the country based on the assessments of lawyers at peer firms" by Vault.com.

For three consecutive years from 2017 to 2019, U.S. News and World Report ranked K&L Gates as the top law firm in the U.S. for environmental litigation ("Law Firm of the Year - Environmental Litigation"). The firm has been named among the "Pacific Northwest Elite" by the website Above the Law, which noted the firm as the "Best Firm for Lobbying Congress in Your Favor".

The firm ranks #41 in the American Lawyer "Global 200" rankings, which ranks firms worldwide by revenue. The legal news site Above the Law ranked the firm number 71 in its 2018 "Power 100" law firm rankings. Financial Times labeled K&L among the "Most innovative North American law firms 2015: Compliance & technology".

K&L Gates received a 100% rating in the 2018 Corporate Equality Index compiled by the Human Rights Campaign Foundation, an LGBT advocacy group. In 2016, the Yale Law Women organization included K&L Gates in the top ten family-friendly law firms.

== Projects ==
In 2012, K&L Gates represented Carnegie Mellon University in a patent suit resulting in a jury verdict awarding $1.17B to the university, one of the largest such verdicts at the time.

In September 2014, K&L Gates established the "Cyber Civil Rights Legal Project". The project initially involves about fifty K&L lawyers working pro bono to assist about 100 victims of "revenge porn". By 2016, the project had aided hundreds of victims and led to a handful of arrests. In April 2017, the project secured an $8.9 million jury award for a King County couple, reportedly the largest award for non-celebrity targets of "revenge porn" to date.

In 2016, K&L Gates awarded a $10 million grant to Carnegie Mellon University (CMU) to establish the "K&L Gates Endowment for Ethics and Computational Technologies". This new research center is to explore the ethics of artificial intelligence and establish a biennial conference. The firm has provided legal services to CMU for decades; K&L Gates Chairman Emeritus Charles J. Queenan Jr. once chaired CMU's Board of Trustees.

In 2017, K&L Gates announced it would create its own blockchain technology as a training tool.

== Political contributions ==
According to OpenSecrets, K&L Gates was one of the law firms contributing the most to federal candidates during the 2012 election cycle, donating $1.09 million, with 52% going to Democratic candidates.

== Lawsuits and controversies ==
K&L Gates has faced several lawsuits from former clients, including accusations of breaching fiduciary duties, overbilling, and malpractice.

In January 2020, a worker with anxiety and ADHD sued K&L Gates for disability bias and retaliation after seeking a work-from-home accommodation; the suit was later settled out of court. In November 2020, former partner Willie E. Dennis sued the firm alleging that his May 2019 termination was "for complaining about discrimination against Black attorneys and for opposing the sexual harassment of female employees."

In May 2025, K&L Gates was sanctioned by retired U.S. Magistrate Judge Michael Wilner in a lawsuit against State Farm. The judge found that attorneys for the firm had acted in bad faith by filing erroneous case law with the court. The case law was generated by an attorney using several artificial intelligence websites and programs. That attorney, working for the law firm Ellis George, then shared the research with attorneys at K&L gates who were also representing the plaintiff against State Farm. K&L Gates attorneys did not research the case law to confirm its accuracy. Judge Wilner ordered the two law firms to pay sanctions in the amount of $31,100 to the defense due.

== Notable lawyers and alumni ==
The following attorneys were affiliated with K&L Gates and its immediate predecessor firms, including, e.g., Preston Gates & Ellis; Nicholson Graham & Jones; Kennedy Covington; Hughes & Luce; Bell, Boyd & Lloyd; and Middletons:

- Jack Abramoff, former lobbyist, writer, and convicted criminal
- Theo Angelis, incumbent Washington Supreme Court justice
- Neal Brendel, former player and chairman of USA Rugby, founder of firm's Dubai office
- John H. Chun, United States District Judge
- Robert William Davis, former U.S. Representative from Michigan's 11th congressional district (1979–93)
- Kymberly Evanson, United States District Judge
- Bart Gordon, former U.S. Representative from Tennessee's 6th congressional district (1985–2011)
- Bob Ferguson, incumbent Governor of Washington
- Betty Binns Fletcher, United States Circuit Judge of the San Francisco–based United States Court of Appeals for the Ninth Circuit between 1979 and 2012. First woman partner of Preston Gates & Ellis (which merged to become K&L Gates).
- William H. Gates Sr, attorney and philanthropist. One of the founders of Preston Gates & Ellis (which merged to become K&L Gates). He was the father of Microsoft co-founder Bill Gates.
- Slade Gorton, former U.S. Senator from Washington(1981–87, 1989–2001), Washington Attorney General (1969–81), Majority Leader of the Washington House of Representatives (1967–69)
- Michael S. Greco, former American Bar Association president (2005–06)
- Ignasi Guardans, former Spanish and European Member of Parliament
- Jerry McDevitt, personal attorney of Vince McMahon and the WWE. Makes frequent television appearances on behalf of the company
- John Michael McHugh, former United States Secretary of the Army (2009–15), U.S. Representative from New York (1993–2009)
- Lloyd Meeds, former U.S. Congressman from Washington’s 2nd congressional district (1965–79), partner in the law firm of Preston Gates Ellis, & Rouvelas Meeds, the D.C. office of Seattle-based Preston Gates & Ellis
- Bill Neukom, former American Bar Association president and managing partner of the San Francisco Giants
- Michael C. Ormsby, U.S. Attorney for the Eastern District of Washington
- J. Nicholas Ranjan, Judge, United States District Court for the Western District of Pennsylvania
- Rick Santorum, former U.S. Senator from Pennsylvania (1995–2007), U.S. Representative from Pennsylvania's 18th congressional district(1991–95), and 2012 Republican presidential candidate
- Eric Schneiderman, former New York Attorney General (2011–18)
- Dick Thornburgh, former Attorney General of the United States (1988–91), Governor of Pennsylvania (1979–87)
- James T. Walsh, former U.S. Representative from Syracuse, New York (1989–2009)
