= William T. Beeks =

American judge

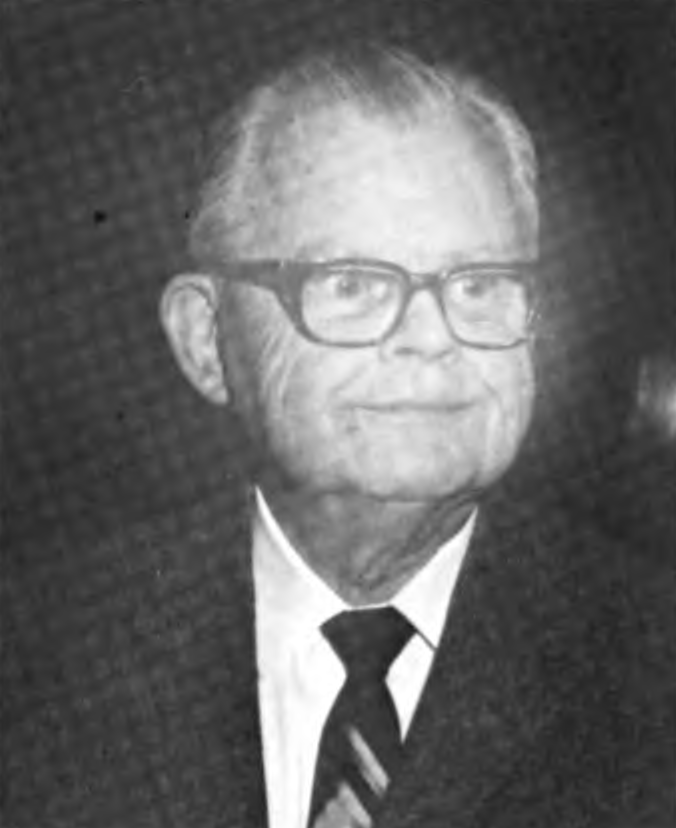

Senior Judge of the United States District Court for the Western District of Washington
- In office May 31, 1973 – December 30, 1978

Chief Judge of the United States District Court for the Western District of Washington
- In office 1971–1973
- Preceded by: George Hugo Boldt
- Succeeded by: William Nelson Goodwin

Judge of the United States District Court for the Western District of Washington
- In office August 15, 1961 – May 31, 1973
- Appointed by: John F. Kennedy
- Preceded by: John Clyde Bowen
- Succeeded by: Donald S. Voorhees

Personal details
- Born: William Trulock Beeks; May 6, 1906 El Reno, Oklahoma
- Died: December 30, 1988 (aged 82) Seattle, Washington
- Education: University of Washington School of Law (LL.B.)

William Trulock Beeks (May 6, 1906 – December 30, 1988) was a United States district judge of the United States District Court for the Western District of Washington.

== Education and career ==
Born in El Reno, Oklahoma, Beeks received a Bachelor of Laws from the University of Washington School of Law in 1932. He was in private practice in Seattle, Washington from 1932 to 1942 before serving in the United States Army during World War II, from 1942 to 1946, where he achieved the rank of Colonel. He served as lead defense attorney for the 43 prisoners tried in the Fort Lawton Riot case, the largest and longest United States Army court-martial of World War II. He returned to private practice in Seattle from 1947 to 1961.

== Federal judicial service ==
On August 4, 1961, Beeks was nominated by President John F. Kennedy to a seat on the United States District Court for the Western District of Washington vacated by Judge John Clyde Bowen. Beeks was confirmed by the United States Senate on August 15, 1961, and received his commission the same day. He served as Chief Judge from 1971 to 1973, assuming senior status due to a certified disability on May 31, 1973, and serving in that capacity until his death on December 30, 1988, in Seattle.

== Sources ==
Legal offices
Preceded by John Clyde Bowen	Judge of the United States District Court for the Western District of Washington; 1961–1973	Succeeded by Donald S. Voorhees
Preceded by George Hugo Boldt	Chief Judge of the United States District Court for the Western District of Washington; 1971–1973	Succeeded by William Nelson Goodwin
