= James M. Dolliver =

American judge (1924–2004)

Justice of the Washington Supreme Court
- In office May 6, 1976 – March 1, 1999
- Nominated by: Daniel J. Evans
- Preceded by: Robert C. Finley
- Succeeded by: Faith Ireland

Personal details
- Born: October 13, 1924 Fort Dodge, Iowa, U.S.
- Died: November 24, 2004 (aged 80) Olympia, Washington, U.S.
- Party: Republican
- Spouse: Barbara Jean Babcock
- Relations: James Isaac Dolliver (father)(Congressman, Iowa-6th District, 1944-1956)
- Children: 6
- Education: Swarthmore College (BA); University of Washington (LLB)
- Occupation: Lawyer, judge

James Morgan Dolliver (October 13, 1924 – November 24, 2004) was an American lawyer, politician and justice of the Washington Supreme Court from 1976 to 1999, who also served as chief justice from 1985 to 1987.

== Early life and education ==
Dolliver was born and raised in Fort Dodge, Iowa. His mother, Elizabeth Morgent, died of polio when he was a newborn. He graduated high school in 1942 and then joined the Navy Air Corps. In 1944, Dolliver's father, James I. Dolliver, a University of Chicago-trained lawyer, was elected to Congress from the Sixth District of Iowa, serving in the House of Representatives for twelve years. A great-uncle, Jonathan P. Dolliver, had been a United States Senator from Iowa from 1900 to 1910.

After the end of World War II, Dolliver enrolled at Swarthmore College, and graduated in 1949. He received a LL.B. from the University of Washington School of Law in 1952.

== Legal career ==
Dolliver took up private practice in Port Angeles and later in Everett. In 1953, Dolliver became the administrative assistant to Congressman Jack Westland (R-Everett), then became an attorney for the state House Republicans. In 1964, Dolliver managed the campaign of Daniel J. Evans, who was elected governor. Dolliver became Evan's chief of staff and political advisor. On May 6, 1976, Evans appointed Dolliver to the Supreme Court. On January 14, 1985, he was sworn in as its new chief justice. Soon after a re-election in 1992, Dolliver suffered a severe stroke in January 1993, but was able to continue working. In 1998, Dolliver announced he would retire at the end of his term.

In 1992, an amendment to the State Constitution to include a "victim's rights" provision drew Dolliver's criticism on the grounds the constitution protects individuals against the government, but not the actions of other people.

== Honors ==
In 1993, Dolliver received the "Outstanding Judge of the Year" award from the Washington State Bar.

In 2000, an endowed professorship was named in honor of Dolliver at the University of Puget Sound, for which he had served as a trustee.

== Personal life ==
Dolliver married Barbara Jean Babcock (January 28, 1927 – July 10, 2013), whom he met at Swarthmore, and they had six children. Dolliver died on November 24, 2004. Dolliver was remembered by the Seattle Times as helping, "shape policy on some of the state's most volatile issues, from pay equality for women to racial integration in labor unions to public-school financing."

== Selected publications ==
- Dolliver, James M. (1900). "Law As A Profession, Will it Survive?". Gonzaga Law Review. 26: 267.
- Dolliver, James M. (1989). "Condemnation, Credit, and Corporations in Washington: 100 Years of Judicial Decisions—Have the Framers' Views Been Followed?". Seattle University Law Review. 12 (2): 163.
- Dolliver, James (1986). "The Washington Constitution and State Action: The View of the Framers". Willamette Law Review. 22: 445.

Political offices
Preceded by Robert C. Finley	Associate Justice of the Washington Supreme Court; 1976–1999	Succeeded by Faith Ireland
