= Donworth =

Donworth is a surname. Notable people with the name include:

- Charles T. Donworth (1892–1976), justice of the Washington Supreme Court
- Grace Donworth (1857–1945), American writer
- George Donworth (1861–1947), American judge

== See also ==
- Don Worth (1924–2009), American photographer
