= Charles H. Leavy =

American judge (1884–1952)

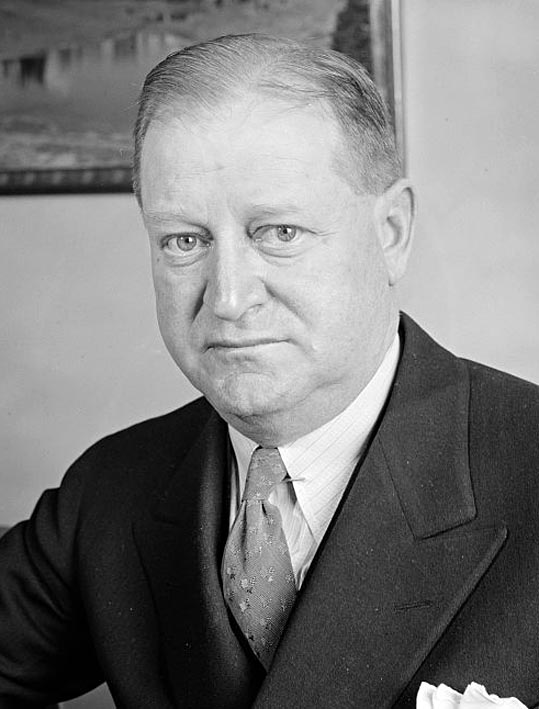
- Leavy in April 1940

Senior Judge of the United States District Court for the Western District of Washington
- In office August 31, 1952 – September 25, 1952

Judge of the United States District Court for the Western District of Washington
- In office February 25, 1942 – August 31, 1952
- Appointed by: Franklin D. Roosevelt
- Preceded by: Edward E. Cushman
- Succeeded by: George Hugo Boldt

Member of the U.S. House of Representatives from Washington's 5th district
- In office January 3, 1937 – August 1, 1942
- Preceded by: Samuel B. Hill
- Succeeded by: Walt Horan

Personal details
- Born: Charles Henry Leavy; February 16, 1884 York, Pennsylvania, U.S.
- Died: September 25, 1952 (aged 68) Tacoma, Washington, U.S.
- Resting place: Mountain View Memorial Park; Tacoma, Washington
- Party: Democratic
- Education: Kansas City School of Law read law

Charles Henry Leavy (February 16, 1884 – September 25, 1952) was a United States representative from Washington and a United States district judge of the United States District Court for the Western District of Washington.

== Education and career ==
Born on February 16, 1884, on a farm in York, York County, Pennsylvania, Leavy moved with his parents to Kansas City, Missouri with his parents in 1887, and attended the public schools of Missouri. He attended the Warrensburg Normal School (now the University of Central Missouri), the Bellingham Normal School (now Western Washington University) and the Kansas City School of Law (now the University of Missouri–Kansas City School of Law) and then read law in 1912. He taught school near Independence, Missouri from 1903 to 1906, and at Everson, Touchet, Kahlotus, and Connell, Washington from 1906 to 1913. He was admitted to the bar and entered private practice in Newport, Washington starting in 1912. He was prosecutor for Pend Oreille County, Washington from 1914 to 1918. He was an Assistant United States Attorney for the Eastern District of Washington from 1918 to 1921. He was prosecutor for Spokane County, Washington from 1922 to 1926, one of his deputy prosecutors being Edward M. Connelly. He was a Judge of the Superior Court of the State of Washington from 1926 to 1936.

== Congressional service ==
Leavy ran for the open United States Senate seat of Clarence Dill in 1934, but was unsuccessful in the primary against Lewis B. Schwellenbach, a Seattle attorney raised in Spokane, who easily won the general election over Reno Odlin of Olympia.

Leavy was elected as a Democrat from Washington's 5th congressional district to the United States House of Representatives of the 75th, 76th, and 77th United States Congresses and served from January 3, 1937, until his resignation on August 1, 1942, to accept an appointment to the federal bench.

== Federal judicial service ==
Leavy's publicly stated ambition was to become a federal judge. Leavy was nominated by President Franklin D. Roosevelt on October 23, 1941, to a seat on the United States District Court for the Western District of Washington vacated by Judge Edward E. Cushman. He was confirmed by the United States Senate on February 18, 1942, and received his commission on February 25, 1942. He assumed senior status due to a certified disability on August 31, 1952. He had been diagnosed with a heart condition approximately a year earlier and had a paralytic stroke on September 11, 1952. His service terminated on September 25, 1952, due to his death in Tacoma, Washington. He was interred in Mountain View Memorial Park in Tacoma.

== Family ==
Leavy was married to Pearl Williams Leavy and had two sons.

== Sources ==
- United States Congress. "Charles Henry Leavy (id: L000185)". Biographical Directory of the United States Congress.

U.S. House of Representatives
Preceded by Samuel B. Hill	Member of the U.S. House of Representatives from Washington's 5th congressional district 1937–1942	Succeeded by Walt Horan
Legal offices
Preceded by Edward E. Cushman	Judge of the United States District Court for the Western District of Washington; 1942–1952	Succeeded by George Hugo Boldt
