= Judge Settle =

Judge Settle may refer to:

- Thomas Settle (judge) (1831–1888), judge of the United States District Court for the Northern District of Florida after serving as an associate justice of the Supreme Court of North Carolina
- Benjamin Settle (born 1947), judge of the United States District Court for the Western District of Washington
