= Rebecca Pennell =

Rebecca Pennell may refer to:

- Rebecca Pennell (educator) (1821–1890), American educator and one of the ten founding professors of Antioch College
- Rebecca L. Pennell (born 1971), American lawyer and United States district judge
