= List of first minority male lawyers and judges in Washington =

This is a list of the first minority male lawyer(s) and judge(s) in Washington. It includes the year in which the men were admitted to practice law (in parentheses). Also included are men who achieved other distinctions such becoming the first in their state to graduate from law school or become a political figure.

== Firsts in Washington's history ==
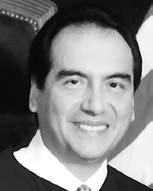
Ricardo S. Martinez: First Hispanic American male Judge of the U.S. District Court for the Western District of Washington (2004)

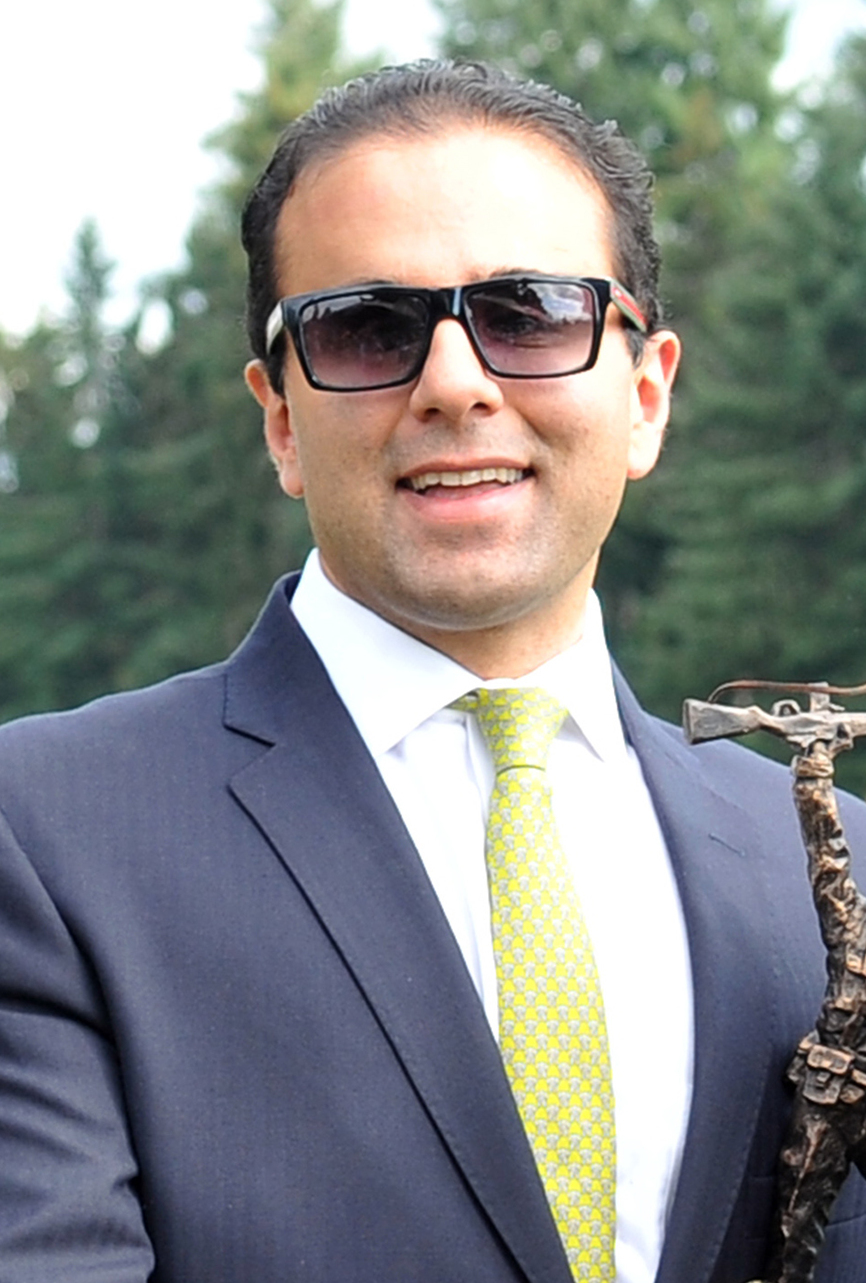
Cyrus Habib: First Iranian American blind male to serve as the Lieutenant Governor of Washington (2017)

=== Lawyers ===
- First African American male: Robert O. Lee (1889)
- First Native American male (Chelan people): Louie Wapato (c. 1907)
- First Japanese American male: Clarence T. Arai (1924)
- First Chinese American male: Warren Chan (1950)
- First Korean American male: Eddie Yoon (1976)

=== Law Clerk ===
- First African American male to clerk for the Washington Supreme Court: Charles Z. Smith (1955)

=== State judges ===
- First African American male: John E. Prim (1927) in 1954
- First Jewish American male: Solie M. Ringold in 1961
- First African American male (municipal court): Charles Z. Smith (1955) in 1965
- First Native American (Cherokee) male: James Phillips in 1929
- First Asian American male (Chinese ancestry; judge pro tem): Warren Chan (1950) in 1956
- First African American male (superior court): Charles Z. Smith (1955) in 1966
- First Asian American male (Chinese ancestry; superior court): Warren Chan (1950) in 1968
- First African American male (district court): Charles M. Stokes (c. 1943) in 1968
- First elected Japanese American male: Richard Ishikawa in 1979
- First Filipino American male: Douglas W. Luna
- First African American male (Washington Supreme Court): Charles Z. Smith (1955) from 1988-2002
- First Asian American male (elected to district court): Mark Chow in 1990
- First Latino American male: Ricardo S. Martinez (1980) in 1990
- First openly gay male: Tim Bradbury in 1995
- First Latino and Jewish American male (Washington Supreme Court): Steven Gonzalez (1991) in 2012
- First Arab American male: Damon Shadid in 2014
- First Samoan American male: Fa’amomoi Masaniai in 2021
- First Latino and Jewish American male (Washington Supreme Court; Chief Justice): Steven Gonzalez (1991) in 2021
- First South Asian male (judge; presiding judge of a Washington court): Ketu Shah in 2019 and 2024, respectively

=== Federal judges ===
- First African American male (U.S. District Court for the Eastern District of Washington; U.S. District Court for the Western District of Washington): Jack Edward Tanner (1955) in 1978
- First Latino American male (U.S. District Court for the Western District of Washington): Ricardo S. Martinez (1980) in 2004
- First Hispanic American male (U.S. District Court for the Eastern District of Washington): Salvador Mendoza Jr. (1997) in 2014
- First Asian American male (of South Korean descent) (United States District Court for the Western District of Washington): John H. Chun in 2022
- First Hispanic American male (United States Court of Appeals for the Ninth Circuit): Salvador Mendoza Jr. (1997) in 2022

=== United States Attorney ===
- First African American male (United States Attorney for the Western District of Washington): Nicholas W. Brown in 2021

=== Assistant United States Attorney ===
- First Jewish American (Western District of Washington): Jeffrey Heiman

=== Attorney General ===
- First African American male: Nicholas W. "Nick" Brown in 2024

=== Assistant Attorney General ===
- First Asian American male: Wing Luke in 1957

=== Political Office ===
- First Iranian American and blind male (Lieutenant Governor of Washington): Cyrus Habib in 2017

=== Washington State Bar Association ===
- First African American male president: Ronald Ward from 2004-2005
- First openly gay male president: Anthony Gipe
- First South Asian male president: Rajeev Majumdar in 2019

== Firsts in local history ==
- (Leonard) Carl Maxey (1951): First African American male lawyer in Eastern Washington
- Jack Edward Tanner (1955): Considered "the first African American in the Pacific Northwest to be elevated to the federal bench"
- Cameron Mitchell: First African American male to serve as a Judge of the Benton-Franklin Superior Court (2004)
- Salvador Mendoza Jr. (1997): First Hispanic American male to serve as a Judge of the Benton-Franklin Superior Court (2013-2014)
- John Edward Hawkins (1895): First African American male lawyer in King County, Washington
- Warren Chan (1950): First Chinese American male lawyer in Seattle, Washington [King County, Washington]
- Solie M. Ringold: First Jewish American male judge in Washington (1961)
- Charles Z. Smith (1955): First African American male appointed as a municipal court judge in Seattle, Washington (1965)
- Charles M. Stokes (c. 1943): First African American male to serve as a Judge of the King County District Court, Washington (1968)
- Mark Chow: First Asian American male elected as a district court judge in King County, Washington (1990)
- Ricardo S. Martinez (1980): First Latino American male to serve as a judge in King County, Washington (1990)
- Gary Maehara: First Asian American male to serve as the President of the King County Bar Association, Washington (2005)
- Dan Gandara: First Latino American male to serve as the President of the King County Bar Association, Washington (2008)
- James Andrus: First African American male to serve as the President of the King County Bar Association, Washington (2009)
- Eduardo Peñalver: First Latino American male to serve as the President of Seattle University School of Law (2021) [King County, Washington]
- Benjamin Santos: First Filipino American male to serve as a Judge of the King County Superior Court (2025)
- Nathan Sargeant: First African American male to serve as a Justice of the Peace in Kitsap County, Washington (1897)
- Theodore "Ted" Spearman Jr.: First African American male judge in Kitsap County, Washington (2004)
- Sergio Armijo: First Latino American male to serve as a Judge of the Pierce County Superior Court (1994)

== See also ==
- List of first minority male lawyers and judges in the United States

== Other topics of interest ==
- List of first women lawyers and judges in the United States
- List of first women lawyers and judges in Washington
