= Samuel Driver =

Samuel Driver may refer to:

- Samuel Rolles Driver (1846–1914), English divine and Hebrew scholar
- Samuel Marion Driver (1892–1958), United States Federal Judge
