= 1934 United States Senate election in Washington =

- November 6, 1934
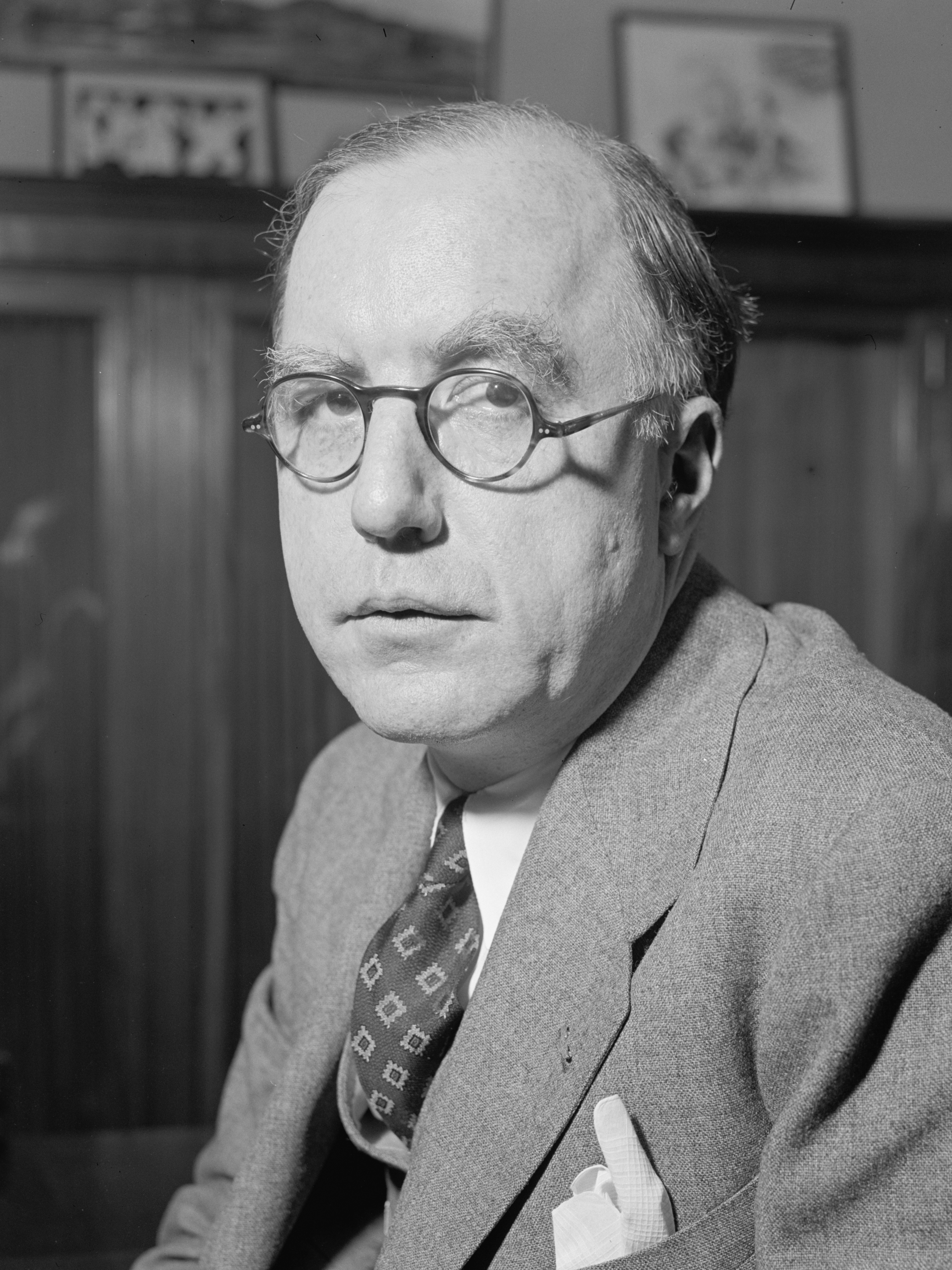

| Nominee | Lewis Schwellenbach | Reno Odlin |
| Party | Democratic | Republican |
| Popular vote | 302,606 | 168,994 |
| Percentage | 60.93% | 34.02% |
- County results Schwellenbach: 50–60% 60–70% Tie: 40–50%
U.S. senator before election
Clarence Dill
Democratic
Elected U.S. Senator
Lewis Schwellenbach
Democratic

The 1934 United States Senate election in Washington was held on November 6, 1934. Incumbent Democrat Clarence Dill did not run for a third term in office. He was succeeded by Democrat Lewis Schwellenbach, who defeated Republican Reno Odlin for the open seat.

== Democratic primary ==
=== Candidates ===
- Harry W. Deegan
- Charles H. Leavy, U.S. representative from Spokane
- John C. Peterson
- Lewis Schwellenbach, Seattle attorney and candidate for governor in 1932
- John C. Stevenson, radio announcer and anti-poverty activist
- James W. Williams

=== Results ===
Democratic primary results by county: Schwellenbach: 30–40%; 40–50%; 50–60%; Stevenson: 30–40%; 40–50%; 50–60%; Leavy: 30–40%; 40–50%; 50–60%; 60–70%; 70–80%; 80–90%; Deegan: 30–40%

1934 Democratic Senate primary
| Party | Candidate | Votes | % |
|---|---|---|---|
| Democratic | Lewis Schwellenbach | 74,999 | 36.50% |
| Democratic | John C. Stevenson | 61,031 | 29.71% |
| Democratic | Charles H. Leavy | 52,459 | 25.53% |
| Democratic | Harry W. Deegan | 6,181 | 3.01% |
| Democratic | John C. Peterson | 5,486 | 2.67% |
| Democratic | James W. Williams | 5,304 | 2.58% |
| Total votes | | 205,460 | 100.00% |

== Republican primary ==
=== Candidates ===
- Frank M. Goodwin
- Ralph Horr, U.S. representative from Seattle since 1931
- Frank R. Jeffrey
- D.V. Morthland, state senator from Yakima since 1917
- Reno Odlin

=== Results ===
Republican primary results by county: Odlin: 20–30%; 30–40%; 40–50%; 50–60%; Morthland: 20–30%; 30–40%; 40–50%; 70–80%; Horr: 30–40%; 40–50%; 50–60%

1934 Republican Senate primary
| Party | Candidate | Votes | % |
|---|---|---|---|
| Republican | Reno Odlin | 36,653 | 28.56% |
| Republican | D.V. Morthland | 33,524 | 26.12% |
| Republican | Ralph Horr | 30,770 | 23.98% |
| Republican | Frank R. Jeffrey | 17,635 | 13.74% |
| Republican | Frank M. Goodwin | 9,753 | 7.60% |
| Total votes | | 128,335 | 100.00% |

== General election ==
=== Candidates ===
- Glen S. Corkrey (Washington Liberty)
- Edward Kriz (Socialist Labor)
- John F. McKay (Socialist)
- Reno Odlin (Republican)
- Lewis Schwellenbach, Seattle attorney and candidate for governor in 1932 (Democratic)
- Chester H. Thompson (Prohibition)
- William J. Wilkins, King County deputy prosecutor (Cincinnatus)

=== Results ===
1934 U.S. Senate election in Washington
| Party | Candidate | Votes | % | ±% |
|---|---|---|---|---|
| Democratic | Lewis Schwellenbach | 302,606 | 60.93% | ▲7.51 |
| Republican | Reno Odlin | 168,994 | 34.02% | ▼12.43 |
| Cincinnatus | William J. Wilkins | 11,866 | 2.39% | N/A |
| Socialist | John F. McKay | 7,192 | 1.45% | N/A |
| Communist | George Edward Bradley | 3,470 | 0.70% | ▲0.56 |
| Prohibition | Chester H. Thompson | 1,551 | 0.31% | N/A |
| Socialist Labor | Edward Kriz | 556 | 0.11% | N/A |
| Liberty | Glen S. Corkrey | 453 | 0.09% | N/A |
| Total votes | | 496,688 | 100.00% | |
| Democratic hold | | Swing | | |

== See also ==
- 1934 United States Senate elections
