= Tiffany Cartwright =

American judge (born 1985)

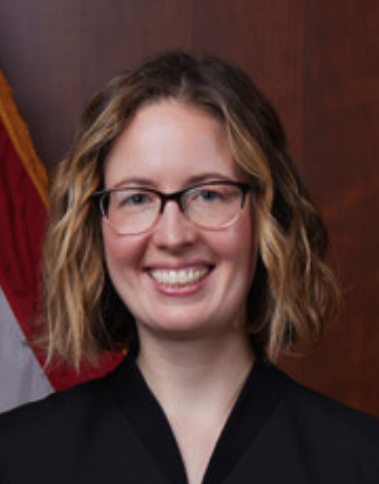

Judge of the United States District Court for the Western District of Washington
- Incumbent
- Assumed office July 18, 2023
- Appointed by: Joe Biden
- Preceded by: Benjamin Settle

Personal details
- Born: 1985 (age 40–41) Lansing, Michigan, U.S.
- Education: Stanford University (BA, JD)

Tiffany Mae Cartwright (born 1985) is a United States district judge of the United States District Court for the Western District of Washington.

== Early life and education ==
Cartwright was born in Lansing, Michigan, and grew up in Kitsap County. She earned a Bachelor of Arts from Stanford University in 2007, where she was elected to Phi Beta Kappa, and a Juris Doctor from Stanford Law School in 2010, where she was a member of the Stanford Supreme Court Litigation Clinic. She was co-editor in chief of Stanford Law & Policy Review in 2009 and 2010. During law school, Cartwright worked at the federal public defender office in Seattle and at the United States Department of Justice Public Integrity Unit. She also worked as a research assistant for Michael W. McConnell.

== Career ==
From 2010 to 2012, Cartwright served as a law clerk for Judge Dana Fabe of the Alaska Supreme Court and for Betty Binns Fletcher of the United States Court of Appeals for the Ninth Circuit. From 2012 to 2014, she was an associate at Jenner & Block in Chicago. In 2014, she joined the law firm MacDonald Hoague & Bayless in Seattle, became a partner in 2018 until she was commissioned as a federal judge.

=== Notable cases ===
In 2017, Cartwright represented the family of Leonard Thomas in connection with claims that he had been wrongfully killed by the Lakewood police department. Following trial, a jury sided with Thomas and awarded Thomas's family $15 million in damages.

In 2020, Cartwright represented the family of 17 year-old MiChance Dunlap-Gittens, who was killed by King County police in a case of mistaken identity, and won a $2.25 million settlement.

In 2021, Cartwright served as pro bono Washington state counsel for the Campaign Legal Center in Aguilar v. Yakima County, a case litigated under the Washington Voting Rights Act.

Cartwright represented several exonerees: a group of men in Fairbanks, Alaska, known as The Fairbanks Four, who spent seventeen years in prison before their exoneration for murder in 2015; Paul Browning, a capital defendant, obtaining his release in 2019 after 33 years on Nevada's death row; and Rodney Wheeler, who was wrongfully accused of homicide and received a $500,000 settlement from King County in 2021.

=== Federal judicial service ===
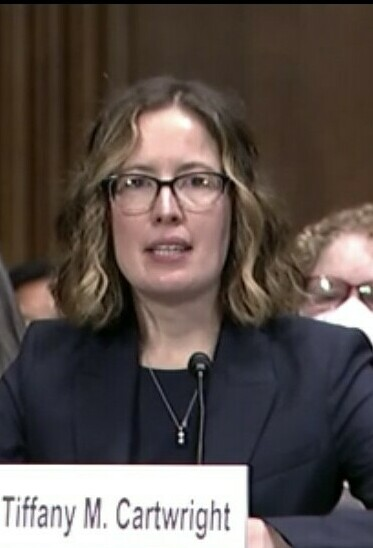
Tiffany Cartwright

On January 19, 2022, President Joe Biden nominated Cartwright to serve as a United States district judge of the United States District Court for the Western District of Washington. The nomination came as part of the Biden administration's larger push to nominate judges with diverse backgrounds and identities. President Biden nominated Cartwright to the seat vacated by Judge Benjamin Settle, who assumed senior status on January 1, 2020. At the time she was nominated she was President Biden's youngest judicial nominee, but between her initial nomination and confirmation she was surpassed by Brad Garcia (D.C. Cir.) and Jamar K. Walker (E.D. Va.).

On May 25, 2022, a hearing on her nomination was held before the Senate Judiciary Committee. On June 16, 2022, her nomination was reported out of committee by a 12–10 vote. In addition to all Democrats on the committee, Cartwright received the support of Republican Senator Lindsey Graham. On January 3, 2023, her nomination was returned to the President under Rule XXXI, Paragraph 6 of the Senate; she was renominated later the same day. On February 2, 2023, her nomination was reported out of the committee by an 11–9 vote. On July 11, 2023, the Senate invoked cloture on her nomination by a 49–42 vote. On July 12, 2023, her nomination was confirmed by a 50–47 vote. She received her judicial commission on July 18, 2023. She was sworn in on August 30, 2023.

Legal offices
Preceded by Benjamin Settle	Judge of the United States District Court for the Western District of Washington; 2023–present	Incumbent
