= Samuel Marion Driver =

American judge

Chief Judge of the United States District Court for the Eastern District of Washington
- In office 1948–1958
- Preceded by: Office established
- Succeeded by: Charles Lawrence Powell

Judge of the United States District Court for the Eastern District of Washington
- In office April 13, 1946 – September 12, 1958
- Appointed by: Harry S. Truman
- Preceded by: Lewis B. Schwellenbach
- Succeeded by: Charles Lawrence Powell

Personal details
- Born: Samuel Marion Driver; May 22, 1892 Wamic, Oregon
- Died: September 12, 1958 (aged 66) Woodland, California
- Education: University of Washington School of Law (LL.B.); Georgetown Law (LL.M.)

Samuel Marion Driver (May 22, 1892 – September 12, 1958) was a United States district judge of the United States District Court for the Eastern District of Washington.

== Education and career ==
Born in Wamic, Oregon, Driver received a Bachelor of Laws from the University of Washington School of Law in 1916. He was in private practice in Waterville, Washington from 1916 to 1923. He was in the United States Army 91st Division in the aftermath of World War I from 1918 to 1919, achieving the rank of corporal. He was a prosecuting attorney of Douglas County, Washington from 1922 to 1923. He was secretary to United States Representative Samuel B. Hill in Washington, D.C. from 1923 to 1926.

He received a Master of Laws from Georgetown Law in 1926. He was a deputy prosecuting attorney of Chelan County, Washington from 1926 to 1927, returning to private practice in Wenatchee, Washington from 1927 to 1937. He was the prosecuting attorney of Chelan County from 1935 to 1937. He was the United States Attorney for the Eastern District of Washington from 1937 to 1940. He was a justice of the Washington Supreme Court from 1940 to 1946, also serving as a colonel in the United States Army JAG Corps during World War II from 1942 to 1946.

== Federal judicial service ==
On March 12, 1946, Driver was nominated by President Harry S. Truman to a seat on the United States District Court for the Eastern District of Washington vacated by Judge Lewis B. Schwellenbach. Driver was confirmed by the United States Senate on April 9, 1946, and received his commission on April 13, 1946. He served as chief judge from 1948 to 1958. He died on September 12, 1958, in Woodland, California.

== Sources ==
Legal offices
Preceded by Lewis B. Schwellenbach	Judge of the United States District Court for the Eastern District of Washington; 1946–1958	Succeeded by Charles Lawrence Powell
Preceded by Office established	Chief Judge of the United States District Court for the Eastern District of Washington; 1948–1958	Succeeded by Charles Lawrence Powell
