= William Nelson Goodwin =

American judge

Chief Judge of the United States District Court for the Western District of Washington
- In office 1973–1975
- Preceded by: William T. Beeks
- Succeeded by: Walter T. McGovern

Chief Judge of the United States District Court for the Eastern District of Washington
- In office 1972–1973
- Preceded by: Charles Lawrence Powell
- Succeeded by: Marshall Allen Neill

Judge of the United States District Court for the Eastern District of Washington Judge of the United States District Court for the Western District of Washington
- In office April 21, 1966 – December 31, 1975
- Appointed by: Lyndon B. Johnson
- Preceded by: Seat established by 75 Stat. 80
- Succeeded by: Jack Edward Tanner

Personal details
- Born: William Nelson Goodwin; August 17, 1909 McKenna, Washington
- Died: December 31, 1975 (aged 66) Tacoma, Washington
- Education: Washington State College (B.A.); University of Oregon School of Law (LL.B.)

William Nelson Goodwin (August 17, 1909 – December 31, 1975) was a United States district judge of the United States District Court for the Eastern District of Washington and the United States District Court for the Western District of Washington.

== Education and career ==
Born in McKenna, Washington, Goodwin received a Bachelor of Arts degree from Washington State College in 1931 and a Bachelor of Laws from the University of Oregon School of Law in 1934. He was a salesman in Washington from 1934 to 1937, until he became a deputy prosecutor for Pierce County, Washington from 1938 to 1940. He was in private practice in Tacoma, Washington from 1940 to 1964, also serving as a United States Marine Corps Private First Class during World War II, from 1944 to 1945, and becoming a member of the Board of Regents of Washington State University from 1957 to 1975. He was the United States Attorney for the Western District of Washington from 1964 to 1966.

== Federal judicial service ==
On March 21, 1966, Goodwin was nominated by President Lyndon B. Johnson to a new joint seat for the United States District Court for the Eastern District of Washington and United States District Court for the Western District of Washington created by 75 Stat. 80. He was confirmed by the United States Senate on April 21, 1966, and received his commission the same day. He served as Chief Judge of the Eastern District from 1972 to 1973 and as Chief Judge of the Western District from 1973 until his death on December 31, 1975, while playing tennis in Tacoma.

== Sources ==
Legal offices
Preceded by Seat established by 75 Stat. 80	Judge of the United States District Court for the Eastern District of Washington; Judge of the United States District Court for the Western District of Washington; 1966–1975	Succeeded by Jack Edward Tanner
Preceded by Charles Lawrence Powell	Chief Judge of the United States District Court for the Eastern District of Washington; 1972–1973	Succeeded by Marshall Allen Neill
Preceded by William T. Beeks	Chief Judge of the United States District Court for the Western District of Washington; 1973–1975	Succeeded by Walter T. McGovern
