= Salvador Mendoza Jr. =

American judge (born 1971)

Salvador Mendoza
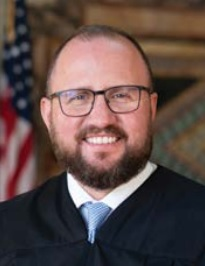
- Mendoza in 2023

Judge of the United States Court of Appeals for the Ninth Circuit
- Incumbent
- Assumed office September 15, 2022
- Appointed by: Joe Biden
- Preceded by: M. Margaret McKeown

Judge of the United States District Court for the Eastern District of Washington
- In office June 19, 2014 – September 16, 2022
- Appointed by: Barack Obama
- Preceded by: Lonny R. Suko
- Succeeded by: Rebecca L. Pennell

Personal details
- Born: 1971 (age 54–55) Pacoima, California, U.S.
- Education: University of Washington (BA); University of California, Los Angeles (JD)

Salvador Mendoza Jr. (born 1971) is an American lawyer serving as United States circuit judge of the United States Court of Appeals for the Ninth Circuit. He previously served as a United States district judge of the United States District Court for the Eastern District of Washington from 2014 to 2022 and as a Washington state court judge from 2002 to 2014.

== Early life and education ==
Mendoza was born in 1971 in Pacoima, California, as the third of five children to parents who immigrated to the United States from Mexico. He grew up in the Mid-Columbia region of Washington state. Mendoza graduated from Prosser High School in 1990.

Mendoza received a Bachelor of Arts in philosophy in 1994 from the University of Washington. He then attended the UCLA School of Law, graduating in 1997 with a Juris Doctor.

== Legal career ==
While in law school, he spent one summer as a legal intern for the United Farm Workers of America. From 1996 to 1998, he served as a legal intern and later an assistant attorney general in the Washington State Attorney General's Office. From 1998 to 1999, he served as a deputy prosecuting attorney in the Franklin County Prosecutor's Office. From 1999 to 2013, he practiced law, both as a solo practitioner and also with various law partnerships, where he focused on criminal law. Mendoza served as a judge pro tempore in various district, municipal, and juvenile courts in Benton County and Franklin County. Mendoza was a board member of the Benton-Franklin Legal Aid Society. He also helped establish two county-level juvenile drug courts.

== Judicial career ==
=== State judicial service ===
Mendoza ran for a vacant seat on the superior court for Benton and Franklin counties in 2008, but lost the election. In May 2013, however, Mendoza was appointed by Governor Jay Inslee to fill another vacancy on the court. He served on the Superior Court bench from 2013 to 2014, until his confirmation to the federal bench.

=== District court service ===
On January 16, 2014, President Barack Obama nominated Mendoza to serve as a United States district judge for the United States District Court for the Eastern District of Washington, to the seat vacated by Judge Lonny R. Suko, who assumed senior status on November 1, 2013. Mendoza's name was forwarded to Obama by Senator Patty Murray upon the recommendation of a bipartisan committee of eight that reviewed candidates for the Eastern District of Washington.

Mendoza received a hearing before the United States Senate Committee on the Judiciary on March 12, 2014. On April 3, 2014, his nomination was favorably reported by the committee by a 17–1 vote. On June 12, 2014, Majority Leader Harry Reid filed cloture on his nomination. On June 16, 2014, the Senate invoked cloture on his nomination by a 55–37 vote. On June 17, 2014, his nomination was confirmed by a 92–4 vote. Mendoza received his judicial commission two days later. A formal installation ceremony took place in August 2014. Mendoza was the first Latino judge of the U.S. District Court for the Eastern District of Washington. His service as a district judge was terminated on September 16, 2022, when he was elevated to the court of appeals.

=== Court of appeals service ===
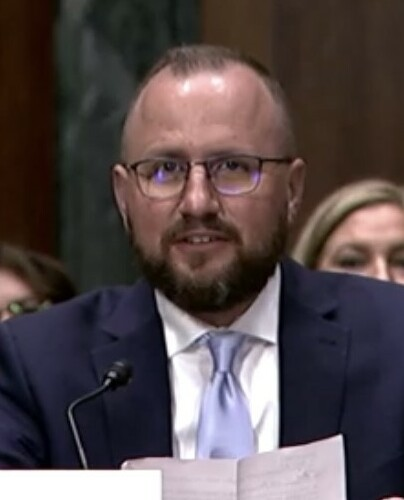
Mendoza testifying before the Senate Judiciary Committee

On April 13, 2022, President Joe Biden announced his intent to nominate Mendoza to serve as a United States circuit judge for the United States Court of Appeals for the Ninth Circuit. On April 25, 2022, his nomination was sent to the Senate. President Biden nominated Mendoza to the seat to be vacated by Judge M. Margaret McKeown, who announced her intent to assume senior status upon confirmation of a successor. On May 11, 2022, a hearing on his nomination was held before the Senate Judiciary Committee. On June 9, 2022, his nomination was favorably reported by the committee by an 11–9–2 vote. On September 6, 2022, Majority Leader Chuck Schumer filed cloture on his nomination. On September 8, 2022, the United States Senate invoked cloture on his nomination by a 48–43 vote. On September 12, 2022, his nomination was confirmed by a 46–40 vote. He received his judicial commission on September 15, 2022. He is the first Hispanic judge from Washington to serve on the Ninth Circuit.

=== Notable cases ===
On November 13, 2023, Mendoza was in a 7–4 majority that temporarily blocked Idaho's abortion ban due to its lack of exceptions for medical emergencies. On January 5, 2024, the Supreme Court said it would take up the case and stayed the 9th Circuit's temporary injunction. The Supreme Court later vacated its stay in Moyle v. United States, returning the case back to the 9th Circuit en banc panel which was subsequently dismissed.

== Personal life ==
Mendoza lives in Kennewick, Washington. He is married to Mia Mendoza née Danielson, an attorney; they have three children.

== See also ==
- List of Hispanic and Latino American jurists
- List of first minority male lawyers and judges in Washington

Legal offices
Preceded by Lonny R. Suko	Judge of the United States District Court for the Eastern District of Washington; 2014–2022	Succeeded by Rebecca L. Pennell
Preceded by M. Margaret McKeown	Judge of the United States Court of Appeals for the Ninth Circuit; 2022–present	Incumbent
