= Jerome Farris =

American judge (1930–2020)

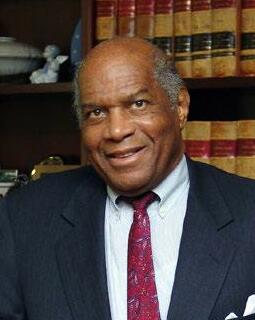

Senior Judge of the United States Court of Appeals for the Ninth Circuit
- In office March 4, 1995 – July 23, 2020

Judge of the United States Court of Appeals for the Ninth Circuit
- In office September 27, 1979 – March 4, 1995
- Appointed by: Jimmy Carter
- Preceded by: Seat established by 92 Stat. 1629
- Succeeded by: M. Margaret McKeown

Personal details
- Born: March 4, 1930 Birmingham, Alabama, US
- Died: July 23, 2020 (aged 90) Seattle, Washington, US
- Education: Morehouse College (BS); Clark Atlanta University (MSW); University of Washington School of Law (JD)

Joseph Jerome Farris (March 4, 1930 – July 23, 2020) was a United States circuit judge of the United States Court of Appeals for the Ninth Circuit.

== Education and career ==
Born in Birmingham, Alabama, Farris received a Bachelor of Science degree from Morehouse College in 1951. July 1951 to February 1951, he was a civil servant radar instructor at Keesler Air Force Base, Mississippi. March 1952 to February 1953, he served in the United States Army Signal Corps at Camp Gordon, Georgia and Fort Monmouth, New Jersey and was discharged as a private first class.

He received a Master of Social Work from Atlanta University (now Clark Atlanta University) in 1955 and a Juris Doctor with Order of the Coif honors from the University of Washington School of Law in 1958. He was in private practice in Seattle, Washington from 1958 to 1969 with various partners, including Leonard W. Schroeter. Farris served as one of the initial judges on the Washington Court of Appeals, Division One, in Seattle from 1969 to 1979.

== Federal judicial service ==
On July 12, 1979, President Jimmy Carter nominated Farris to a new seat on the United States Court of Appeals for the Ninth Circuit created by 92 Stat. 1629. The United States Senate confirmed the nomination on September 26, 1979, and Farris received his commission on September 27, 1979. He assumed senior status on March 4, 1995, and M. Margaret McKeown was named to replace him.

Farris's Ninth Circuit law clerks include Gregory Mandel, who later became Dean of Temple University Beasley School of Law, and Brenda K. Sannes, who later became a judge of the United States District Court for the Northern District of New York.

== Opinions ==
In Hirabayashi v. United States (1987), Farris sat on the circuit panel that by coram nobis unanimously vacated an exclusion order conviction that had been upheld by the Supreme Court of the United States during the World War II wartime internment of Japanese Americans.

In 1997, Farris published an article arguing that, while the Ninth Circuit is the circuit most often reversed by the United States Supreme Court, this was not due to error or the circuit being "too liberal" but rather the circuit hears a large number of cases involving controversial topics, and "courts cannot determine right and wrong in an absolute sense because the law is not absolute." Although a Democratic appointee, Farris was described by his colleague Stephen Reinhardt as "extremely conservative on criminal justice issues."

=== Tree cutting ===
In August 2002, Farris had 120 cherry and maple trees in Colman Park, a city park in Seattle, cut down to improve the view of Lake Washington from his house. Norm Maleng, the King County Prosecuting Attorney, declined to file felony malicious mischief charges. The Seattle City Attorney settled with the judge for a fine of $500,000. After Farris refused to pay the fine on time the city placed a lien on his 8,000 square-foot Mount Baker house. Farris claimed the trees were cut down due to a miscommunication with his Vietnamese gardener, which the gardener denied. A jury heard testimony from the gardener when Farris sued his homeowner's insurer for coverage of the fine. The jury ruled against Farris. Farris finally paid the full fine (with interest) in the amount of $618,000 in May 2006.

== Civic activities ==
In 1985, Governor Mike Lowry appointed Farris to a six-year term as a Regent of the University of Washington, and then he was re-appointed by Governor Gary Locke, serving until 1997. Starting in 1999, he served on the Board of Trustees of his alma mater, Morehouse College, from which he received a Doctor of Law (LL.D.) in 1978.

== Personal life ==
On June 27, 1957, Farris married Jean Marie Shy in King County, Washington, and they had two daughters: Juli and Janelle. Jean died on December 2, 1992. Jerome died on July 23, 2020, in Seattle, Washington.

== See also ==
- List of African-American federal judges
- List of African-American jurists

== Videos ==
- Upon Reflection: Judge Jerome Ferris, 1989 (27 mins. YouTube) University of Washington Television interview.

Legal offices
Preceded by Seat established by 92 Stat. 1629	Judge of the United States Court of Appeals for the Ninth Circuit; 1979–1995	Succeeded by M. Margaret McKeown
