= Alaska Association of Criminal Defense Lawyers =

U.S. professional organization

- Formation: November 30, 2009; 16 years ago
- Type: Legal Association
- Headquarters: Anchorage, Alaska
- Location: United States
- President: Jeff Robinson
- Website: www.akacdl.org

The Alaska Association of Criminal Defense Lawyers (AKACDL), founded November 30, 2009, is a voluntary non-profit professional association created to serve the needs of criminal defense attorneys in Alaska. AKACDL's primary goal is to provide continuing legal education ("CLE") for new attorneys as well as seasoned practitioners, and for both public defenders and private practitioners. AKACDL presents an annual educational event named the "AKACDL All*Stars Conference," usually featuring four nationally recognized speakers at a two-day conference held at the Alyeska Resort in Girdwood, Alaska.

== History ==
AKACDL was founded in 2009 by four Anchorage criminal defense lawyers: Darrel J. Gardner, Andrew J. Lambert, Steve M. Wells, and F. Rich Curtner. Except for Rich Curtner, all of the founders have served as president of the association. According to the AKACDL website,

The Alaska Association of Criminal Defense Lawyers was incorporated on November 30, 2009. With more than 200 members having since joined, AKACDL is Alaska's preeminent criminal defense organization.

== Mission ==
The goals of AKACDL are: To promote study and research in the field of criminal defense law and procedure and constitutional law. To disseminate by lecture, seminars, and publications such theories, technologies, and techniques that support or promote the field of criminal defense advocacy. To sponsor periodic meetings of the criminal defense bar; to provide a forum for the exchange of information regarding the administration of criminal justice; and thereby to protect individual rights and improve the practice and procedures of criminal law. To represent the association before the legislative, executive, and judicial bodies which determine policy for the state and federal governments in a manner that promotes the mission of the association and its objectives and purposes. To preserve, protect, and defend the adversary system of justice and the Alaska and U.S. Constitutions.

== Continuing legal education ==
AKACDL's primary mission is to provide continuing legal education (CLE), for new attorneys as well as seasoned practitioners, and for public defenders as well as private practitioners. AKACDL presents an annual "All*Stars Conference" featuring numerous nationally recognized speakers. Throughout the year AKACDL also offers short educational seminars, which are typically free to members. AKACDL works with other defense organizations to promote CLE opportunities for its members. AKACDL is an official Affiliate Member of the National Association of Criminal Defense Lawyers.

== Amicus curiae and litigation ==
As amicus curiae, AKACDL helped secure a victory before the Alaska Supreme Court in Barber v. State (Opinion No. S-6850, December 6, 2013). AKACDL was also a named plaintiff in a lawsuit against the State of Alaska filed by the ACLU of Alaska, challenging as unconstitutional a new bail law in 2010.

== Other involvement ==
AKACDL is a supporter of the Alaska Innocence Project, and the Alaska Bar Association's annual Bar Convention.
