= William O. Douglas Federal Building =

Historic building in Washington, United States

- U. S. Post Office and Courthouse
- U.S. National Register of Historic Places
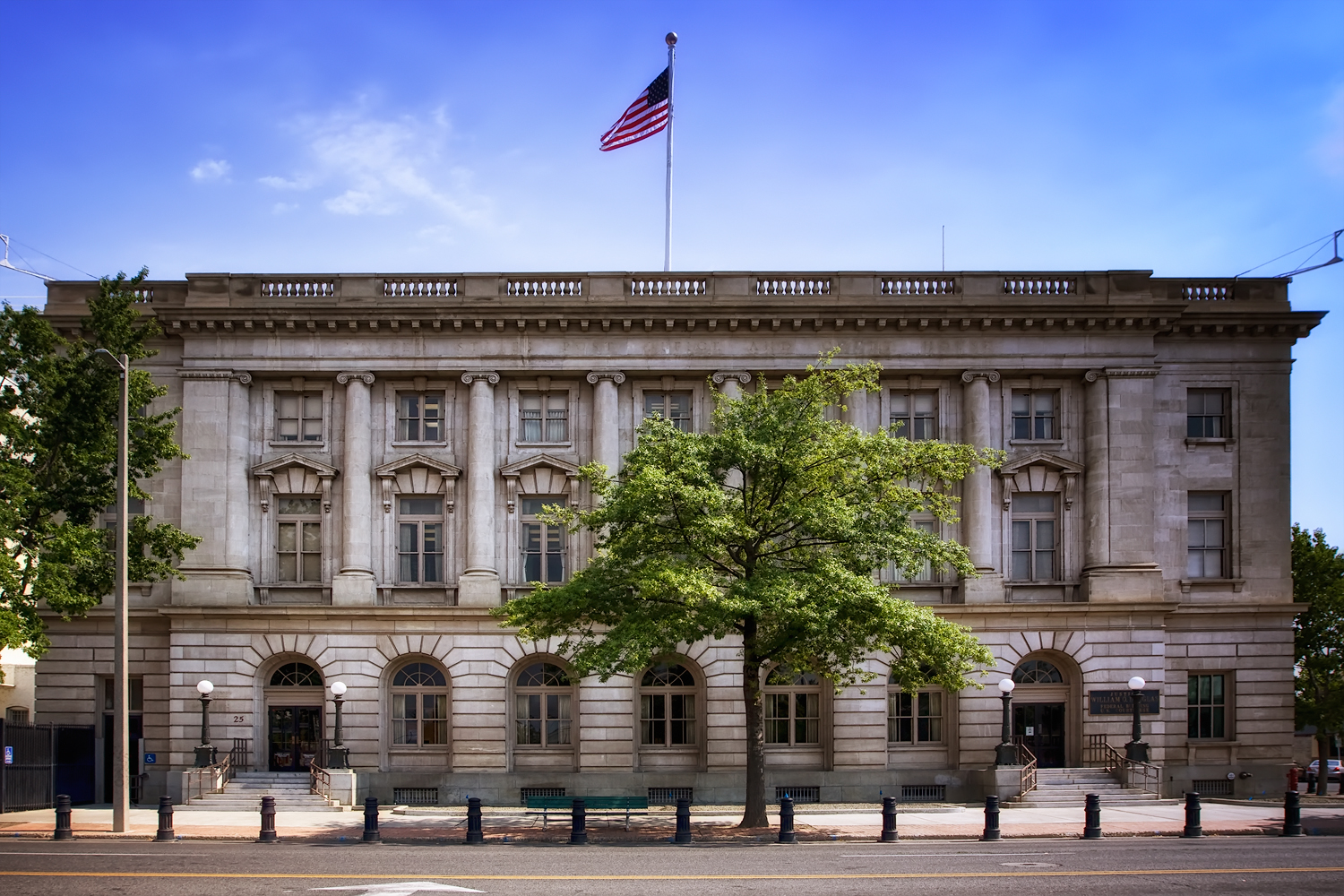
- William O. Douglas Federal Building, 1985

- Location within Washington (state)
- Map showing the location of U.S. Post Office and Courthouse, Yakima
- Location: 25 S. 3rd St, Yakima, Washington
- Coordinates: 46°36′7.27″N 120°30′7.73″W
- Area: less than one acre
- Built: 1912
- Architect: James Knox Taylor; Maxwell, W. H.
- Architectural style: Late 19th And 20th Century Revivals, Second Renaissance Revival
- NRHP reference No.: 79002568
- Added to NRHP: November 27, 1979

The William O. Douglas Federal Building is a historic post office, courthouse, and federal office building located at Yakima in Yakima County, Washington. It is a courthouse for the United States District Court for the Eastern District of Washington. Renamed in 1978, it was previously known as U.S. Post Office and Courthouse, and is listed under that name in the National Register of Historic Places.

== Building history ==
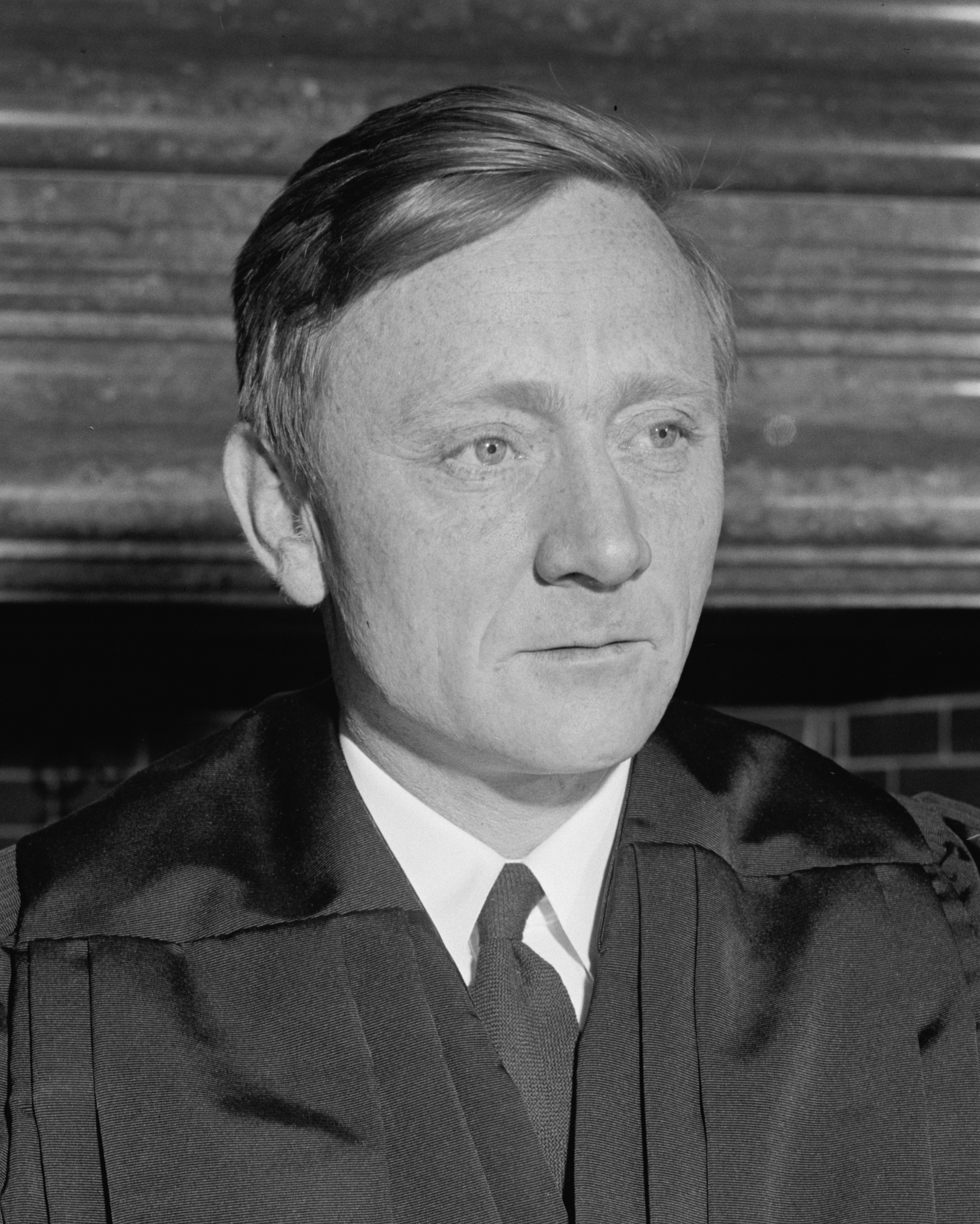
Supreme Court Justice William O. Douglas, who the building was named in honor of in 1978

The first post office in Yakima opened in 1885. By 1910, federal officials selected a location for a new post office and courthouse building in the town. Designed by Supervising Architect of the Treasury James Knox Taylor, the building is Yakima's premier example of Second Renaissance Revival style architecture. To celebrate the grand building's opening in June 1912, Postmaster W.L. Lemon hosted an open house and employees led citizens on tours. The building's first tenants included the post office, federal courts, U.S. Marshals, Reclamation Service, Land Office, and Weather Bureau. The first court case was tried in the building in July 1912.

In 1926, a single-story annex was added to the rear of the building. In 1939, Supervising Architect of the Treasury Louis A. Simon designed three-story wings that extended the north and south elevations to the east; Simon also demolished and replaced the 1926 annex with a single-story addition that connected the wings. Construction was complete by 1940. In 1987, the architectural firm of Paddock & Hollingbery designed a two-story, brick-faced infill addition that was built on the existing rear addition. At the same time, interior spaces were renovated and restored, and the building's mechanical systems were upgraded to current standards.

In 1978, Congress passed a resolution to rename the building to honor Justice William O. Douglas, who served on the Supreme Court from 1939, when he was nominated by President Franklin Delano Roosevelt, until his retirement in 1975. Although born in Minnesota, Douglas grew up in Yakima. With a term of more than 36 years, Justice Douglas remains the longest-serving justice in Supreme Court history. The building was listed in the National Register of Historic Places in 1979.

== Architecture ==
The monumental William O. Douglas Federal Building is an excellent example of Second Renaissance Revival architecture, a classically inspired and dignified style that conveyed the stability of the federal government.

The nearly square, three-story structure features concrete spread footings, a steel frame, reinforced concrete floors, and exterior brick walls that are faced in high-quality granite and limestone. The symmetrical facade faces west onto South Third Street and first story is clad with deeply incised rusticated New Hampshire granite. This first-story articulation is a character-defining feature of Second Renaissance Revival architecture. A belt course divides the first and second levels. Smooth Indiana limestone panels clad the upper stories. Recessed bays flank a central, seven-bay, projecting pavilion. The street level is dominated by a series of regularly spaced round-arch openings containing both double-hung sash windows and entry doors, all of which feature fanlights. Radiating voussoirs surround each of the arched openings. Recessed entrances are located at each end of the projecting pavilion, and the entry stairs are flanked by tall, cast-bronze pedestal lamps topped with spherical globes. Articulated voussoirs capped with pediments top the pavilion's second story flat-arch windows. Textured consoles featuring anthemia leaves support the pediment's gable returns. Projecting window sills are supported by brackets that flank simple rectangular panels. Smaller square windows with prominent scrolled keystones are aligned above the second-story windows. Upper story windows are separated by two-story engaged Ionic order columns that form an impressive colonnade that dominates the central upper bays of the facade. The colonnade supports an unadorned architrave and frieze that are surmounted by a molded cornice with prominent modillion blocks. A parapet with a classical balustrade tops the building.

The architects of subsequent additions successfully designed them to be compatible with the existing building. The wings, added in 1940, extend to the east on both the north and south elevations and employ similar materials and design tenets. However, instead of modillion blocks, a convex molding is in place on the wings' cornice. South wing walls are clad in buff-colored brick. The 1987 infill uses a similar brick finish.

Interior spaces retain many original materials and features. Although no longer a tenant, the post office originally occupied the first floor. Large round-arched postal windows with oak frames and sash remain in the postal lobby. Bronze postal lock boxes featuring Greek key patterns also allude to the space's prior use. Floors are covered in terrazzo with dark marble borders. The baseboard and wainscot are grey Vermont Light Cloud Rutland marble, while remaining wall surfaces are covered in plaster. A coffered ceiling tops the lobby and features pendant lights that date to 1940. A marble staircase is located at the lobby's south end.

The two-story, second-floor courtroom also retains some historic features. Details include original oak panel doors with classical surrounds, wainscot, baseboards, plaster walls with classically inspired panel molding, and ornamental plaster ceilings. Second-floor corridors have plaster walls with marble baseboards and oak chair rails. Square 1940 light fixtures remain.

Exterior Door

Exterior columns

Exterior window details

Exterior windows

Interior Court room

Interior lobby

Interior doors

== Significant events ==
- 1910 Yakima selected as site for new federal building
- 1912 Building completed
- 1926 One-story annex added to east elevation
- 1940 Annex demolished and wings and rear addition built
- 1978 Building named to honor Justice William O. Douglas
- 1979 Building listed in the National Register of Historic Places
- 1987 Two stories added to rear addition and interior restored

== Building facts ==
- Location: 25 South Third Street
- Architects: James Knox Taylor; Louis A. Simon; Paddock & Hollingbery
- Construction Dates: 1911-1912; 1940; 1987
- Architectural Style: Second Renaissance Revival
- Landmark Status: Listed in the National Register of Historic Places
- Primary Materials: Limestone; Granite
- Prominent Features: Monumental, Classical Facade; Second-Story Ionic Colonnade; Former Postal Lobby with Historic Finishes
