= M. Margaret McKeown =

American judge (born 1951)

Margaret McKeown
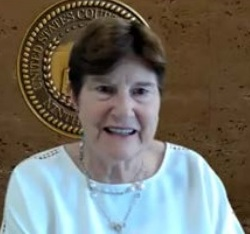
- McKeown in 2021

Senior Judge of the United States Court of Appeals for the Ninth Circuit
- Incumbent
- Assumed office September 15, 2022

Judge of the United States Court of Appeals for the Ninth Circuit
- In office April 8, 1998 – September 15, 2022
- Appointed by: Bill Clinton
- Preceded by: Jerome Farris
- Succeeded by: Salvador Mendoza Jr.

Personal details
- Born: Mary Margaret McKeown; May 11, 1951 (age 75) Casper, Wyoming, U.S.
- Party: Democratic
- Education: University of Wyoming (BA); Georgetown University (JD)

Mary Margaret McKeown (born May 11, 1951) is a senior United States circuit judge of the United States Court of Appeals for the Ninth Circuit based in San Diego. McKeown has served on the Ninth Circuit since her confirmation in 1998.

== Early life and education ==
McKeown, a native of Casper, Wyoming, graduated from Kelly Walsh High School in Casper in 1969. She attended the University of Madrid and graduated Phi Beta Kappa from the University of Wyoming with a Bachelor of Arts in 1972.

She worked for Senator Clifford P. Hansen, whom she credits with inspiring her interest in the legal profession. McKeown received her Juris Doctor in 1975 from Georgetown University Law Center. She also received an honorary Doctor of Laws from Georgetown.

== Legal career ==
McKeown was the first female partner with the law firm of Perkins Coie in Seattle and Washington, D.C. McKeown specialized in intellectual property, antitrust, trade regulation, and complex litigation, representing clients like Boeing, Nintendo, Amazon, and Citicorp. McKeown was co-founder of the firm’s Washington, D.C. office and founded the firm’s intellectual property practice. She spent over two decades at the firm.

From 1980 until 1981, McKeown served as a White House Fellow. She worked as a Special Assistant to Secretary of the Interior Cecil D. Andrus and as Special Assistant for domestic policy at the White House.

McKeown was the president of the Federal Bar Association of the Western District of Washington and a founder and first co-president of the statewide Washington Women Lawyers.

== Teaching and scholarship ==
McKeown is the jurist-in-residence at the University of San Diego (USD) School of Law.

She taught at Georgetown University Law Center, Northwestern University Law School, and the University of Washington School of Law. McKeown is an affiliated scholar at the Center for the American West at Stanford University.

Selected publications include: "The Lost Sanctuary: Examining Sex Trafficking Through the Lens of Ah Sou" (Cornell Journal of International Law, 2008); "Happy Birthday Statute of Anne: The Dance Between the Courts and Congress" (Berkeley Technology Law Journal, 2010); "To Judge or Not to Judge: Transparency and Recusal in the Federal System" (The Review of Litigation, 2011); "The Internet and the Constitution: A Selective Retrospective" (Washington Journal of Law, Technology & Arts, 2014); "Culinary Ambiguity: A Canonical Approach to Deciphering Menus" (Harvard Journal on Legislation, 2014); "Beginning with Brown: Springboard for Gender Equality and Social Change" (San Diego Law Review, Fall 2015); "The ABA Rule of Law Initiative: Celebrating 25 Years of Global Initiatives" (Michigan Journal of International Law, 2018); "The Nineteenth Amendment Centennial Cookbook: 100 Recipes for 100 Years" (ABA 2019); "My Mother Made Me Do It: A Short History of the Nineteenth Amendment" (Litigation, 2020); "The Judiciary Steps Up to the Workplace Challenge" (Northwestern University Law Review, 2021); and "Politics and Judicial Ethics: A Historical Perspective" (Yale Law Journal Forum, 2021).

She is the author of Citizen Justice: The Environmental Legacy of Justice William O. Douglas—Public Advocate and Conservation Champion (Potomac Press 2022).

== Federal judicial service ==
On March 29, 1996, President Bill Clinton nominated McKeown for a seat on the United States Court of Appeals for the Ninth Circuit, and then renominated her on January 7, 1997. McKeown was confirmed by the United States Senate on March 27, 1998, by an 80–11 vote. She received her commission on April 8, 1998. On January 12, 2022, McKeown announced that she would assume senior status upon the confirmation of her successor. On September 15, 2022, she assumed senior status.

She has served on multiple committees for the court. For the Ninth Circuit, she currently serves as chair of the Workplace Environment Committee and chair of the Pacific Islands Committee. She has also served on the Executive Committee of the Ninth Circuit, chair of the Ninth Circuit Judicial Conference, the Ad Hoc Death Penalty Rules Committee, and chair of the Ninth Circuit Education Commission.

She served as chair of the Judicial Conference of the United States Codes of Conduct Committee, the national ethics committee for federal judges, and is currently a member of the Judicial Conference of the United States Committee on Judicial Conduct and Disability. McKeown served as a member of the ABA Commission to redraft the Model Code of Judicial Ethics.

McKeown has worked on promoting a better work environment within the judiciary in her position as Chair of the Workplace Environment Committee for the Ninth Circuit and her appointment by Chief Justice Roberts to the Federal Judiciary Workplace Conduct Working Group.

She is former president of the Federal Judges Association and the San Diego Association of Business Trial Lawyers. She served as chair of the ABA Commission on the Nineteenth Amendment and the ABA Standing Committee on Federal Judicial Improvements. She has also served on the Managerial Board of the International Association of Women Judges.

=== Statistics ===
Between December 2014 and August 2020, McKeown sat on an en banc panel 29 times. McKeown was in the majority in all 29 of the en banc cases she heard during that period. She has also authored more than 600 opinions.

=== Cases ===
==== En banc ====
- Skidmore as Tr. for Randy Craig Wolfe Tr. v. Led Zeppelin, 952 F.3d 1051 (9th Cir. 2020) (en banc). On rehearing en banc, McKeown wrote for the majority to clarify the scope of copyright protection under federal law. A songwriter’s estate claimed that Led Zeppelin’s Stairway to Heaven copied portions of the rock song Taurus. The Ninth Circuit held that under the Copyright Act of 1909, the scope of the copyright in Taurus was limited to the 1967 deposit copy. This meant that the estate could not play sound recordings for the jury to evaluate whether Stairway to Heaven and Taurus were substantially similar. Additionally, the court formally abrogated the “inverse ratio rule” which had permitted a lower standard of proof to satisfy the “substantial similarity” test if a plaintiff could demonstrate that the alleged infringer had a high degree of access to the protected work. In doing so, McKeown wrote that the rule “defies logic” and joined the Second, Fifth, Seventh, and Eleventh Circuits to dispose of its use.
- City of Oakland v. Wells Fargo & Co., 14 F. 4th 1030 (9th Cir. 2021) (en banc). The City of Oakland, California claimed that Wells Fargo’s discriminatory lending practices caused higher default rates, which in turn triggered higher foreclosure rates that drove down the assessed value of properties, and which ultimately resulted in lost property tax revenue and increased municipal expenditures for the city. McKeown wrote for a unanimous en banc panel to hold that these downstream “ripples of harm” were too attenuated and traveled too “far beyond” Wells Fargo’s alleged misconduct to establish proximate cause under recent Supreme Court precedent. Absent proximate cause, the city failed to state a claim that Wells Fargo violated the Fair Housing Act.

==== Copyright ====
- Garcia v. Google, Inc., 786 F.3d 733 (9th Cir. 2015) (en banc). Actor Cindy Lee Garcia was tricked into performing in a blasphemous video proclamation against the Prophet Mohammed. The video was uploaded to YouTube and garnered millions of views. Garcia received death threats. Asserting a copyright interest in her performance, Garcia sought a preliminary injunction against Google to remove the film from its platform. On rehearing en banc, McKeown wrote that the district court did not abuse its discretion in denying Garcia a preliminary injunction based on her copyright claim. Garcia failed to establish a likelihood of success on the merits because Garcia’s fleeting performance in the video did not amount to a “work” under copyright law, and she was unlikely to experience irreparable harm because the video had already persisted for months online before she sought the injunction. Finally, McKeown dissolved the prior panel’s takedown order to Google because the film was of substantial interest to the public and a prior restraint of speech under the First Amendment, and Garcia could not overcome the heavy presumption against such restraints with her thin copyright claim.
- Dr. Seuss Enterprises, L.P. v. ComicMix LLC, 983 F.3d 443 (9th Cir. 2020). This case concerned a book titled “Oh, the Places You’ll Boldly Go!”: a Dr. Seuss and Star Trek “mashup.” The comic book contains various elements from Dr. Seuss’s famous book entitled “Oh, the Places You’ll Go!”, which were mashed-up with several characters, imagery, and elements from the Star Trek science fiction franchise. Writing for the panel, McKeown concluded that ComicMix had created, without seeking permission or a license, a non-transformative commercial work that targets and usurps the original work’s potential market. Because the work was neither transformative nor parody, it did not qualify as fair use.

==== Criminal ====
- United States v. Cotterman, 709 F.3d 952 (9th Cir. 2013) (en banc). Cotterman was traveling back from Mexico with his wife. Border Agents got an alert that Cotterman was a sex offender convicted for child molestation. They conducted a cursory search of his laptop and found no incriminating pictures but did find password-protected files. Given the alert and the protected files, agents seized the laptop at the U.S.-Mexico border and shipped it 170 miles away for a full forensic examination. In this second inspection, agents discovered child pornography. At trial, the district court granted Cotterman's motion to suppress the evidence of child pornography obtained during the forensic examination because there was no reasonable suspicion of criminal activity. Writing for the en banc majority, McKeown held the Fourth Amendment required that Border Agents have reasonable suspicion before they may conduct a forensic examination of a traveler's personal electronic equipment.

==== Immigration ====
- Quintero Perez v. United States, 8 F.4th 1095 (9th Cir. 2021). In Quintero Perez v. USA, a Mexican national was fatally shot by U.S. Border Patrol while on U.S. soil. The shot caused the Mexican national’s body to fall exactly on the U.S.-Mexico Border. The family of the deceased Mexican national sued the United States under the Alien Tort Statute (ATS) and the Federal Tort Claims Act (FTCA) and also brought Fourth Amendment Bivens claims against the agent and the supervisor in charge of Border Patrol. McKeown’s majority opinion held that the ATS and FTCA claims were barred by sovereign immunity and the applicable statute of limitations, respectively. With respect to the Fourth Amendment Bivens claims, McKeown held that these claims presented a new context and declined to extend Bivens to reach this new context.

==== Antitrust ====
- DeHoog v. Anheuser-Busch InBev SA/NV, 899 F.3d 758 (9th Cir. 2018). A group of beer consumers sued to prevent Anheuser-Busch InBev, SA/NV from acquiring SABMiller, plc, alleging that the merger was anticompetitive and violated Section 7 of the Clayton Act. Writing for a unanimous panel, McKeown dismissed the consumers’ lawsuit because the acquisition “did not create a reasonable probability of anticompetitive effects in the U.S. beer market” because the Department of Justice had required SAB to completely divest its interests in the domestic beer market.

==== International law ====
- Von Saher v. Norton Simon Museum of Art at Pasadena, 897 F.3d 1141 (9th Cir. 2018). This case involved the ownership of two oil paintings by Lucas Cranach the Elder that were forcibly sold to Nazi officials from a Dutch art dealer after the German invasion of the Netherlands in 1940. After the war, the Allied Forces recovered the paintings and turned them over to the Dutch government, which sold the paintings to an individual, who later re-sold them to the Norton Simon Museum in Pasadena, California. In the 1990s, descendants of the Dutch art dealer sought restitution in the Dutch Court of Appeals, which denied relief. In her opinion, McKeown also denied relief. Applying the act of state doctrine, she “decline[d] the invitation to invalidate the official actions of the Netherlands,” and held that the museum had valid title to the paintings.
- de Fontbrune v. Wofsy, 838 F.3d 992 (9th Cir. 2016), as amended on denial of rehearing and rehearing en banc (November 14, 2016). This case involved a multi-year litigation centered on photographs of Pablo Picasso’s artwork. Vincent de Frontbrune received a $2.2 million judgment in French court and sought to enforce the judgment in California. McKeown’s majority opinion held that astreinte (a French judicial device) functioned not as a fine but as a grant of monetary recovery, thus allowing the judgment to be enforced in federal court under the California Uniform Foreign-Court Monetary Judgment Recognition Act.

==== Gender discrimination ====
- Costa v. Desert Palace, 299 F.3d 838 (9th Cir. 2002) (en banc). In an opinion written by McKeown, the en banc panel held that Title VII of the Civil Rights Act of 1964 imposes no special or heightened evidentiary burden on a plaintiff in a mixed-motive sex discrimination case. In this case, a forklift operator—the only woman in her bargaining unit—claimed that her employer, a Las Vegas casino, had fired her in part on account of her sex. Further, she claimed to have been singled out and harassed by her male colleagues and subjected to unwarranted disciplinary sanctions throughout her employment. McKeown’s opinion affirmed the casino’s liability, as well as the judgment for back-pay and compensatory damages. The opinion noted that discrimination on the basis of sex need only be “a motivating factor,” rather than the sole motivating factor, in order for a plaintiff to be able to bring a Title VII claim.
- Edmo v. Corizon, Inc., 935 F.3d 757 (9th Cir. 2019). In a per curiam opinion, the panel held that an incarcerated transgender woman had a right to gender-affirming surgery. For prison officials to deny her access to such “medically necessary” care, the panel wrote, would constitute cruel and unusual punishment in violation of the Eighth Amendment. The panel concluded that the prisoner was entitled to injunctive relief, because “the deprivation of [her] constitutional right to adequate medical care is sufficient to establish irreparable harm.”

== Awards ==
McKeown is the recipient of the: American Inns of Court Professionalism Award for the Ninth Circuit; ABA John Marshall Award; ABA Margaret Brent Women of Achievement Award; Big Sisters Outstanding Mentor Award; California Bar Association Intellectual Property Vanguard Award; Federal Bar Association Public Service Award; Georgetown University Law Center Robert F. Drinan Public Service Award; Georgetown University Law Center Outstanding Alumnae; Georgetown University John Carroll Award (highest honor); Girl Scouts Cool Women Award; University of Wyoming Distinguished Alumni Award; Washington Women Lawyers’ President’s Award; White House Fellows Legacy of Leadership Award; and Federal Bar Association Public Service Award.

In 2020, McKeown was elected to the American Academy of Arts & Sciences. She served as past chair of the White House Fellows Foundation and the Georgetown Law School Board of Visitors. Additionally, she was on the national boards of Volunteers of America and Girl Scouts U.S.A.

McKeown serves on the board of the Teton Science School in Jackson, Wyoming.

She participated in the first American mountain climbing expedition to Mount Shishapangma in Tibet.

== Law reform work ==
McKeown was elected to the American Law Institute in 1993 and was elected to the ALI Council in 2009. She has served as an Adviser on several projects, including: Intellectual Property: Principles Governing Jurisdiction, Choice of Law, and Judgments in Transnational Disputes; Restatement of the U.S. Law of International Commercial Arbitration and Investor-State Arbitration; and Restatement of U.S. Foreign Relations Law. She is also a current Advisor on the Restatement of the Law for Copyright.

== Rule of law work ==
McKeown has lectured and taught throughout the world on intellectual property, international law, human rights law, litigation, ethics, judicial administration, and constitutional law and has participated in numerous rule of law initiatives with judges and lawyers. In 2016, McKeown took part in the 10th annual International Humanitarian Law Dialogs in Nuremberg, Germany, where she presented the Nuremberg Declaration—a joint statement by international prosecutors. McKeown has chaired the American Bar Association’s Rule of Law Initiative and is a senior advisor. She previously chaired ABA ROLI Latin America and the Caribbean Council. She serves on the board of the World Justice Project and on the Judicial Advisory Board of the American Society of International Law.

== Book ==
In 2022, McKeown published a nonfiction book, Citizen Justice: The Environmental Legacy of William O. Douglas.

== See also ==
- Barack Obama Supreme Court candidates

Legal offices
Preceded by Jerome Farris	Judge of the United States Court of Appeals for the Ninth Circuit; 1998–2022	Succeeded by Salvador Mendoza Jr.
