= The Sword and the Gavel =

Autobiography of William J. Wilkins

- Title page for The Sword and the Gavel (1981)
- Author: William J. Wilkins (judge)
- Language: English
- Genre: Autobiography
- Publication date: 1981
- Publication place: United States

The Sword and the Gavel is the autobiography of Judge William J. Wilkins, the last of the Nuremberg Trials judges, published in 1981. Wilkins also presided over the Betty MacDonald libel trial brought by ten plaintiffs who claimed they were the "Ma and Pa Kettle" family in MacDonald's best-seller The Egg and I.
