= Edward E. Cushman =

American judge

Senior Judge of the United States District Court for the Western District of Washington
- In office November 3, 1939 – January 25, 1944

Judge of the United States District Court for the Western District of Washington
- In office May 1, 1912 – November 3, 1939
- Appointed by: William Howard Taft
- Preceded by: George Donworth
- Succeeded by: Charles H. Leavy

Personal details
- Born: Edward E. Cushman; November 26, 1865 Columbus Junction, Iowa, U.S.
- Died: January 25, 1944 (aged 78) Tacoma, Washington, U.S.
- Education: read law

Edward E. Cushman (November 26, 1865 – January 25, 1944) was a United States district judge of the United States District Court for the Western District of Washington.

== Education and career ==
Born in Columbus Junction, Louisa County, Iowa, Cushman read law to enter the bar in Iowa and in Nebraska in 1890. He was in private practice in Stromsburg, Nebraska from 1890 to 1893, and in Tacoma, Washington from 1893 to 1900. He was an Assistant United States Attorney for the District of Washington from 1900 to 1904, and was a special assistant to the United States Attorney General for the Ninth Judicial Circuit from 1904 to 1909. He was a United States Territorial Judge for the United States District Court for the Territory of Alaska from 1909 to 1912.

== Federal judicial service ==
On April 9, 1912, Cushman was nominated by President William Howard Taft to a seat on the United States District Court for the Western District of Washington vacated by Judge George Donworth. Cushman was confirmed by the United States Senate on May 1, 1912, and received his commission the same day. He assumed senior status on November 3, 1939, serving in that capacity until his death on January 25, 1944, in Tacoma.

== Sources ==
Legal offices
Preceded by George Donworth	Judge of the United States District Court for the Western District of Washington; 1912–1939	Succeeded by Charles H. Leavy
