= Marshall Allen Neill =

American judge

Chief Judge of the United States District Court for the Eastern District of Washington
- In office 1973–1979
- Preceded by: William Nelson Goodwin
- Succeeded by: Robert James McNichols

Judge of the United States District Court for the Eastern District of Washington
- In office August 9, 1972 – October 6, 1979
- Appointed by: Richard Nixon
- Preceded by: Charles Lawrence Powell
- Succeeded by: Justin L. Quackenbush

Member of the Washington State Senate from the 9th district
- In office 1957 – April 24, 1967
- Preceded by: Ava Clark
- Succeeded by: Elmer Huntley

Member of the Washington House of Representatives from the 9th district
- In office January 24, 1949 – 1957

Personal details
- Born: Marshall Allen Neill; August 23, 1914 Pullman, Washington
- Died: October 6, 1979 (aged 65)
- Party: Republican
- Education: Washington State University (B.A.); University of Idaho College of Law (J.D.)

Marshall Allen Neill (August 23, 1914 – October 6, 1979) was a United States district judge of the United States District Court for the Eastern District of Washington.

== Education and career ==
Born in Pullman, Washington, Neill received a Bachelor of Arts degree from Washington State University in 1935 and a Juris Doctor from the University of Idaho College of Law in 1938. He was in private practice in Pullman from 1938 to 1967, serving as city attorney of Pullman from 1939 to 1952. He was a Lieutenant (J.G.) in the United States Navy during World War II, from 1944 to 1946. He was an assistant state attorney general of Washington between 1946 and 1967, and a lecturer at Washington State University from 1946 to 1957. He was a member of the Washington House of Representatives from 1949 to 1956 and of the Washington Senate from 1957 to 1967. He was an associate justice of the Washington Supreme Court from 1967 to 1972.

== Federal judicial service ==
On June 13, 1972, Neill was nominated by President Richard Nixon to a seat on the United States District Court for the Eastern District of Washington vacated by Judge Charles Lawrence Powell. Neill was confirmed by the United States Senate on August 2, 1972, and received his commission on August 9, 1972. He served as Chief Judge from 1973 to 1979. Neill served in that capacity until his death on October 6, 1979.

== Sources ==
Legal offices
Preceded by Charles Lawrence Powell	Judge of the United States District Court for the Eastern District of Washington; 1972–1979	Succeeded by Justin Lowe Quackenbush
Preceded by William Nelson Goodwin	Chief Judge of the United States District Court for the Eastern District of Washington; 1973–1979	Succeeded by Robert James McNichols
