= Frank Burgess =

American judge (1935–2010)

Personal information
- Born: March 9, 1935 Eudora, Arkansas, U.S.
- Died: March 26, 2010 (aged 75) University Place, Washington, U.S.
- Listed height: 6 ft 1 in (1.85 m)

Career information
- College: Arkansas–Pine Bluff (1953–1954); Gonzaga (1958–1961)
- NBA draft: 1961: 3rd round, 27th overall pick
- Drafted by: Los Angeles Lakers
- Position: Shooting guard

Career history
- 1961–1962: Hawaii Chiefs

Career highlights
- Consensus second-team All-American (1961); NCAA scoring champion (1961); No. 44 retired by Gonzaga Bulldogs
- Stats at Basketball Reference

Franklin Douglas Burgess (March 9, 1935 – March 26, 2010) was an American professional basketball player and United States district judge of the United States District Court for the Western District of Washington.

== Early life ==
Burgess was born in Eudora, Arkansas. A man with a good sense of humor, he once described his hometown as being so small that "the only fast food we had in that town was if you hit a deer going 70 (miles per hour)." He attended Arkansas Agricultural, Mechanical and Normal College (Arkansas AM&N), a small school now known as the University of Arkansas at Pine Bluff, for one year while also playing on the basketball team. He then joined the Air Force and spent a four-year tour of duty in Europe. Burgess still played basketball even in Germany and was so good that he was picked to be one of the 10 best Air Force players in the world. While stationed at Hahn Air Force Base he averaged 33.4 points per game. It was during this time that Burgess met Mel Porter, a fellow American Air Force officer and Gonzaga University alumnus. Porter recognized Burgess' talent and played middle man to Burgess and the Gonzaga Bulldogs men's basketball coach, Hank Anderson. Although Burgess had also started to receive serious interest from Kansas and USC, he ultimately chose to attend Gonzaga because he felt that that school would get him the most prepared for life after basketball. "You have to remember, I had gotten out of the service, and I was married with twin girls. I was about getting an education and taking care of my family," he said to a newspaper reporter later in his life.

== College ==
Burgess matriculated at Gonzaga University in the fall of 1958 after his stint in the Air Force had ended. He spent three years at Gonzaga, from 1958–59 to 1960–61. He led the Bulldogs in scoring all three seasons, scored 40 or more points in a game seven times with a career-high 52 points against UC Davis, led the NCAA in scoring in 1960–61 with a 32.4 points per game average, and finished as the school's all-time leading scorer with 2,196 points. He received All-American honors in both his junior and senior seasons, while in his senior year he was a consensus Second Team All-American. Although his Gonzaga career ended in 1961, Burgess is etched in the records book at the school, including:

Career

- Points – 2,196 (2nd) (Note: This remained the Gonzaga men's record for more than 60 years before being broken by Drew Timme in the final of the 2023 West Coast Conference tournament.)
- Scoring average – 28.1 (1st)
- Field goals made – 800 (2nd) (Note: This record was also broken by Timme in the 2022–23 season.)
- Field goals attempted – 1,780 (1st)
- Free throws made – 596 (1st)
- Free throws attempted – 727 (1st)

Season

- Scoring average – 32.4 (1st); 28.9 (2nd); 23.2 (5th)
- Points – 842 (2nd); 751 (4th)
- Field goals made – 304 (3rd); 265 (5th)
- Free throws made – 234 (2nd); 221 (3rd)

Game

- Points – 52 (1st)
- 40+ points – 7 times (1st)
- Free throws made – 16 (T-1st)

All-time ranks accurate through the 2022–23 season.

== Later life ==
Frank Burgess
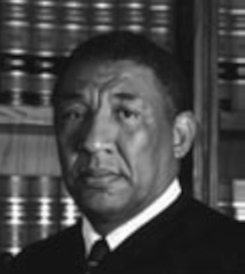

Senior Judge of the United States District Court for the Western District of Washington
- In office March 9, 2005 – March 26, 2010

Judge of the United States District Court for the Western District of Washington
- In office March 28, 1994 – March 9, 2005
- Appointed by: Bill Clinton
- Preceded by: Jack Edward Tanner
- Succeeded by: Benjamin Settle

Magistrate Judge of the United States District Court for the Western District of Washington
- In office 1981–1993

Personal details
- Education: Gonzaga University (BA, JD)

Burgess graduated with a degree in education in the spring of 1961 and was then drafted by the Los Angeles Lakers of the National Basketball Association. He instead chose to play in the fledgling American Basketball League with the Hawaii Chiefs, but after two years the league folded. He decided to go back to school and enrolled at the Gonzaga University School of Law, where he graduated near the top of his class despite working the midnight shift for Washington Water Power.

=== Legal career ===
From 1966 to 1967, Burgess was a Legal intern for the United States Atomic Energy Commission. After six months, he became an assistant city attorney of Tacoma, Washington until 1969. Burgess then spent the next 11 years (until 1980) as a private practice lawyer with Jack Edward Tanner. He was a Judge pro tem, Municipal Court and Pierce County District Court during that time. From 1980 to 1981, Burgess was a regional counsel for the Department of Housing and Urban Development in Seattle, and then became a U.S. Magistrate in the United States District Court for the Western District of Washington from 1981 to 1993.

==== Federal judicial service ====
Burgess became a United States district judge of the United States District Court for the Western District of Washington when President Bill Clinton nominated him on November 19, 1993, to a seat vacated by Jack Edward Tanner. He was confirmed by the United States Senate on March 25, 1994, and received his commission on March 28, 1994. Burgess assumed senior status on March 9, 2005.

Burgess died on March 26, 2010, from cancer.

== See also ==
- List of African-American federal judges
- List of African-American jurists

Legal offices
Preceded by Jack Edward Tanner	Judge of the United States District Court for the Western District of Washington; 1994–2005	Succeeded by Benjamin Settle
