= Jack Edward Tanner =

American judge (1919–2006)

Senior Judge of the United States District Court for the Western District of Washington
- In office January 28, 1991 – January 10, 2006

Judge of the United States District Court for the Eastern District of Washington
- In office May 19, 1978 – November 8, 1978
- Appointed by: Jimmy Carter
- Preceded by: William Nelson Goodwin
- Succeeded by: Seat abolished

Judge of the United States District Court for the Western District of Washington
- In office May 19, 1978 – January 28, 1991
- Appointed by: Jimmy Carter
- Preceded by: William Nelson Goodwin
- Succeeded by: Frank Burgess

Personal details
- Born: Jack Edward Tanner; January 28, 1919 Tacoma, Washington, US
- Died: January 10, 2006 (aged 86) Tacoma, Washington, US
- Education: University of Washington (LLB)

Jack Edward Tanner (January 28, 1919 – January 10, 2006) was a United States district judge of the United States District Court for the Eastern District of Washington and the United States District Court for the Western District of Washington.

== Education and career ==
Born in Tacoma, Washington, Tanner was in the United States Army during World War II, from 1943 to 1945. He worked as a longshoreman in Tacoma until his graduation from law school. He received a Bachelor of Laws from the University of Washington School of Law in 1955. He was in private practice in Tacoma from 1955 to 1978. He was a regional leader of the NAACP from 1957 to 1965.

== Federal judicial service ==
On January 20, 1978, Tanner was nominated by President Jimmy Carter to a joint seat on the United States District Court for the Eastern District of Washington and the United States District Court for the Western District of Washington, vacated by Judge William Nelson Goodwin. Tanner was confirmed by the United States Senate on May 17, 1978, and received his commission on May 19, 1978, becoming the first black federal judge in the northwest United States. On November 8, 1978, Tanner was reassigned to the Western District alone. He assumed senior status on January 28, 1991, serving in that capacity until his death of pancreatic cancer, on January 10, 2006, in Tacoma.

== See also ==
- List of African-American federal judges
- List of African-American jurists
- List of first minority male lawyers and judges in Washington

== Sources ==
Legal offices
Preceded by William Nelson Goodwin	Judge of the United States District Court for the Eastern District of Washington; 1978	Succeeded by Seat abolished
Preceded by William Nelson Goodwin	Judge of the United States District Court for the Western District of Washington; 1978–1991	Succeeded by Frank Burgess
