= Walt Horan =

American politician (1898–1966)

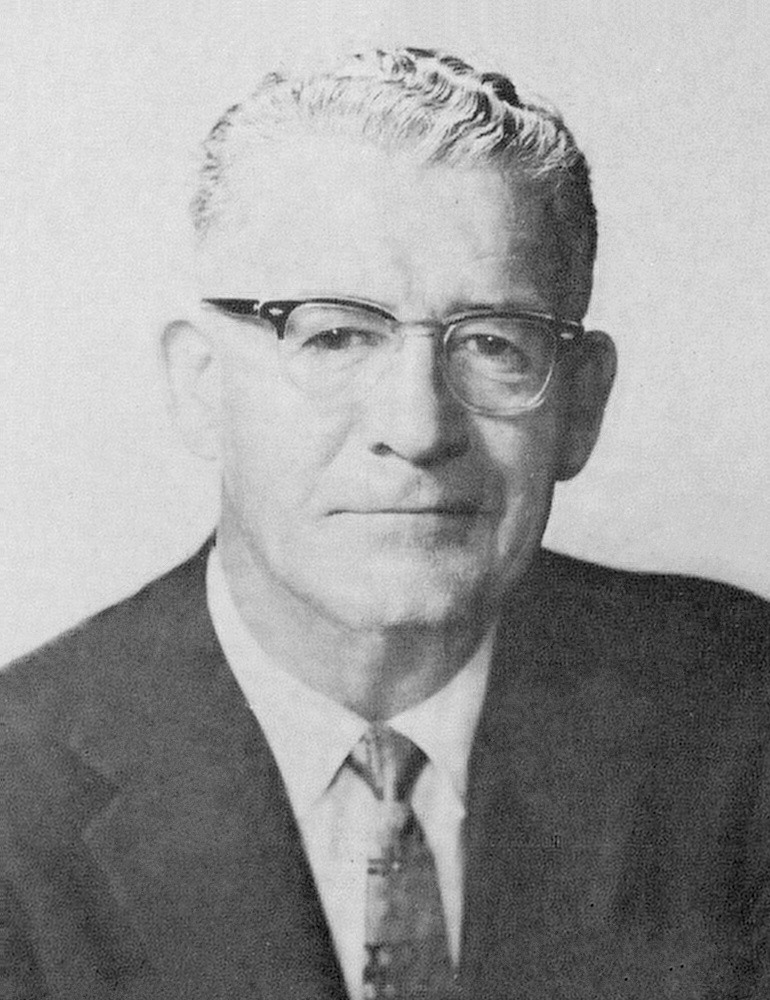
- Horan c. 1958

Member of the U.S. House of Representatives from Washington's 5th district
- In office January 3, 1943 – January 3, 1965
- Preceded by: Charles H. Leavy
- Succeeded by: Tom Foley

Personal details
- Born: Walter Franklin Horan; October 15, 1898 Wenatchee, Washington, U.S.
- Died: December 19, 1966 (aged 68) Manila, Philippines
- Resting place: Wenatchee City Cemetery; Wenatchee, Washington
- Party: Republican
- Spouse(s): Helen L. "Sally" Campbell (1904–95)
- Children: 5
- Education: Washington State College (BS)
- Occupation: Fruit grower

Military service
- Allegiance: United States
- Branch/service: United States Navy
- Years of service: 1917–1919
- Battles/wars: World War I

Walter Franklin Horan (October 15, 1898 – December 19, 1966) was an American politician, a congressman from Eastern Washington for 22 years. First elected in 1942, he was a Republican member of the United States House of Representatives for eleven terms, from January 3, 1943, to January 3, 1965. Horan represented Washington's 5th congressional district, which included Spokane and Wenatchee.

== Early life ==
A fruit grower and packer, Horan was born and raised near Wenatchee, Washington, the younger son of Michael and Margaret A. (Rankin) Horan. His father Mike was a pioneer fruit grower in the valley and the son of Irish immigrants. Walt served in the U.S. Navy as a gunner's mate during World War I, and earned a bachelor's degree from Washington State College in Pullman in 1925. His wife, Helen L. "Sally" Campbell of Eureka, Montana, was a college classmate. Horan and his older brother John operated one of the largest fruit ranches in the state. He ran for Congress in 1942, primarily to improve the representation of the agricultural sector.

== Congressional career ==
Horan ran for Congress in 1940 from the 5th congressional district, but lost the general election to the two-term incumbent, Democrat Charles H. Leavy. Leavy resigned in August 1942 to become a federal judge on the U.S. District Court in western Washington, which left the seat vacant. In the Republican primary in September, Horan defeated Spokane attorney and civic leader Joe Albi, then easily defeated former two-term U.S. Senator and 1940 gubernatorial candidate Clarence Dill in the general election in November. Horan's victory was the first win by a Republican in the district in twenty years.

In Congress, he acted as chairman of the House District of Columbia Committee, and sat on the Agriculture, Legislative, State, Commerce, Justice, and Judiciary Sub-Committees of the House Appropriations Committee. Horan voted in favor of the Civil Rights Acts of 1957, 1960, and 1964, as well as the 24th Amendment to the U.S. Constitution.

=== Defeat ===
Seeking a twelfth term at age 66, Horan won the Republican primary over Sam C. Parks, but was defeated in the 1964 general election by Democrat Tom Foley, a 35-year-old Spokane lawyer. Foley held the seat for the next thirty years, including the last six as speaker of the House, until defeated in 1994 at age 65 by George Nethercutt.

Horan suffered acute pulmonary edema on election night in Wenatchee and was hospitalized for several weeks. Ten months earlier in January, he had been treated at Bethesda Naval Hospital for a pleurisy attack, which was publicly known.

== Death ==
Two years out of office, Horan and his wife Sally (1904–95) were in the Philippines in December 1966 to visit their daughter and her family. He suffered a fatal heart attack in Manila at age 68. Horan and his wife are buried in the Wenatchee City Cemetery.

The plaza at the federal courthouse in Spokane is named for Horan. The brothers' fruit operation continues as McDougall & Sons. Following John's stroke (and death in 1954), Jacquelyn (1924–2008), eldest of his four daughters, and her husband Robert D. McDougall (1924–2012) took over management of Horan Brothers after Walt Horan's son Michael ran the orchard until it was taken by the government and turned into a park. All of the fruit trees were cut down.

U.S. House of Representatives
Preceded by Charles H. Leavy	Member of the U.S. House of Representatives from Washington's 5th congressional district 1943–1965	Succeeded by Tom Foley
