= Charles Lawrence Powell =

American judge

Senior Judge of the United States District Court for the Eastern District of Washington
- In office April 21, 1972 – August 17, 1975

Chief Judge of the United States District Court for the Eastern District of Washington
- In office 1959–1972
- Preceded by: Samuel Marion Driver
- Succeeded by: William Nelson Goodwin

Judge of the United States District Court for the Eastern District of Washington
- In office June 17, 1959 – April 21, 1972
- Appointed by: Dwight D. Eisenhower
- Preceded by: Samuel Marion Driver
- Succeeded by: Marshall Allen Neill

Personal details
- Born: Charles Lawrence Powell; March 19, 1902 Lawrence, Kansas
- Died: August 17, 1975 (aged 73)
- Education: University of Washington School of Law (LL.B.)

Charles Lawrence Powell (April 19, 1902 – August 17, 1975) was a United States district judge of the United States District Court for the Eastern District of Washington.

== Education and career ==
Born in Lawrence, Kansas, Powell received a Bachelor of Laws from the University of Washington School of Law in 1925. He was in private practice in Seattle, Washington from 1925 to 1929, and in Kennewick, Washington from 1929 to 1959. He was prosecuting attorney of Benton County, Washington from 1931 to 1934 and from 1941 to 1946, serving as city attorney of Kennewick from 1934 to 1944.

== Federal judicial service ==
On May 26, 1959, Powell was nominated by President Dwight D. Eisenhower to a seat on the United States District Court for the Eastern District of Washington vacated by Judge Samuel Marion Driver. Powell was confirmed by the United States Senate on June 16, 1959, and received his commission the following day. He served as Chief Judge from 1959 to 1972, assuming senior status on April 21, 1972, and serving in that capacity until his death on August 17, 1975.

== Sources ==
Legal offices
Preceded by Samuel Marion Driver	Judge of the United States District Court for the Eastern District of Washington; 1959–1972	Succeeded by Marshall Allen Neill
Preceded by Samuel Marion Driver	Chief Judge of the United States District Court for the Eastern District of Washington; 1959–1972	Succeeded by William Nelson Goodwin
