= Gregory Mandel =

Academic administrator and lawyer

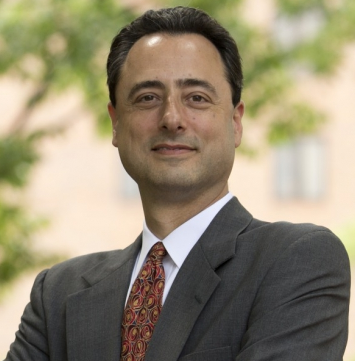

Provost and Laura H. Carnell Professor of Law of Temple University
- Incumbent
- Assumed office August 2021
- Preceded by: JoAnne A. Epps

Personal details
- Education: Wesleyan University (BA); Stanford University (JD)
- Occupation: University Provost, Law School Dean, Lawyer, Law Professor

Gregory Mandel is Provost and Laura H. Carnell Professor of Law at Temple University. He previously served as Dean of the Temple University Beasley School of Law. He succeeded former Provost JoAnne A. Epps, who returned to the faculty of the Temple University Beasley School of Law before being named acting president of the university in 2023 and dying in office later that year.

== Education ==
Dean Mandel received his J.D. from Stanford Law School and his undergraduate degree in physics and astronomy from Wesleyan University. Dean Mandel has taught Introduction to Intellectual Property, Patent Law, Advanced Patent Law, and Property.

== Career ==
Provost Mandel was President of the Board of The Miquon School from 2013–2015. His pro bono legal work includes a prominent asylum case before the Attorney General of the United States and the Ninth Circuit Court of Appeals.

Provost Mandel served as the Temple University School of Law's Associate Dean for Research from 2009–2016 and was Associate Dean for Research and Professor of Law at Albany Law School prior to joining Temple.

Before entering academia, he practiced law with Skadden, Arps, Slate, Meagher & Flom LLP and Affiliates, clerked for Judge Joseph Jerome Farris, United States Court of Appeals for the Ninth Circuit, and interned with Chief Judge Anthony Joseph Scirica, United States Court of Appeals for the Third Circuit.
