= Benjamin Settle =

American judge (born 1947)

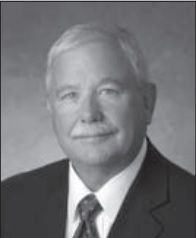
- circa 2008

Senior Judge of the United States District Court for the Western District of Washington
- Incumbent
- Assumed office January 1, 2020

Judge of the United States District Court for the Western District of Washington
- In office July 2, 2007 – January 1, 2020
- Appointed by: George W. Bush
- Preceded by: Frank Burgess
- Succeeded by: Tiffany Cartwright

Personal details
- Born: 1947 (age 78–79) Olympia, Washington
- Education: Claremont McKenna College (BA); Willamette University (JD)

Benjamin Hale Settle (born 1947) is a senior United States district judge of the United States District Court for the Western District of Washington.

== Education and career ==
Settle was born in Olympia, Washington. He received a Bachelor of Arts degree from Claremont McKenna College in 1969 and a Juris Doctor from Willamette University College of Law in 1972. He was in private practice in Washington in 1972, and again from 1976 to 2007. From 1973 to 1976, he was a captain in the United States Army Judge Advocate General's Corps as a defense counsel stationed at Fort Lewis, Washington.

=== Federal judicial service ===
On January 9, 2007, Settle was nominated by President George W. Bush to a seat on the United States District Court for the Western District of Washington vacated by Judge Frank Burgess. Settle was confirmed by the United States Senate on June 28, 2007, and received his commission on July 2, 2007. He assumed senior status on January 1, 2020. Several of his rulings have received national attention. In 2022, he sentenced a naturopathic doctor for misbranding drugs. In 2023, he upheld Washington's in-state requirement for owning a cannabis business, arguing that the interstate commerce clause does not apply since cannabis is federally illegal. In 2025, he issued an injunction on the Trump Administration's policy prohibiting transgender individuals from serving in the military.

== Sources ==
Legal offices
Preceded by Frank Burgess	Judge of the United States District Court for the Western District of Washington; 2007–2020	Succeeded by Tiffany Cartwright
