= Grace Donworth =

American writer (1857–1945)

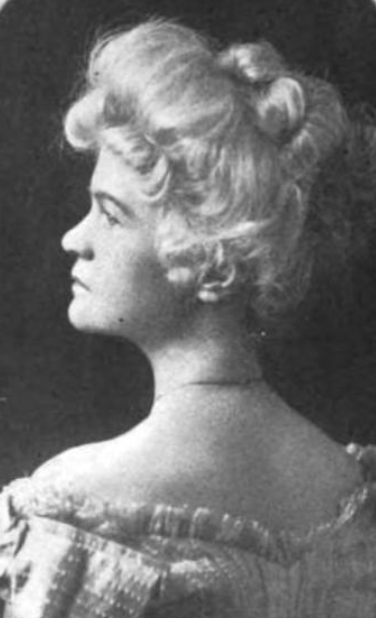
- Grace Donworth, from a 1909 publication
- Born: July 22, 1857; Machias, Maine, US
- Died: November 25, 1945 (aged 88); Machias, Maine, US
- Occupations: Writer, artist
- Relatives: George Donworth (brother)

Grace Donworth (July 22, 1857 – November 25, 1945) was an American writer and artist, based in Maine. Mark Twain promoted her "Jennie Allen" books to his audiences.

== Early life ==
Donworth was born on July 22, 1857, in Machias, Maine, the daughter of Patrick Enright Donworth and Mary Eliza Baker Donworth. Her father was a lumberman, and her four brothers became lawyers. Her brother George Donworth was a judge in Washington state. Her younger brother Albert B. Donworth was also a writer. She graduated from Notre Dame Academy, with further art training in Boston.

== Career ==
Donworth taught school in Massachusetts and Maine. She was regent of the Machias chapter of the Daughters of the American Revolution (DAR). She also belonged to the American Folklore Society and the Boston Authors Club.

Donworth joined other women in Providence, Rhode Island, to assemble relief shipments to the victims of the 1906 San Francisco earthquake; while there, she wrote humorous letters to a fellow aid worker, Miss Stockbridge, in the persona of an "unsophisticated and old fashioned" seamstress. Those became her "Jennie Allen" stories. Stockbridge shared the letters with her brother and with a DAR meetings, and they eventually came to the attention of Mark Twain.

Mark Twain enjoyed Donworth's "Jennie Allen" writings. They were first presented to him as genuine correspondence, but he soon knew they were Donworth's creation: "'Jennie's' letters are an innocent fraud, and a quite justifiable one, since they make pleasant reading and can harm no one," he wrote in a 1906 letter. He helped her find a publisher, and promoted her works to his audiences. In Everybody's Magazine, J. B. Kerfoot called The Letters of Jennie Allen "the best piece of homely fun of the year."

== Publications ==
- The Letters of Jennie Allen (1908) (first published in Ladies' Home Journal)
- Down Home with Jennie Allen (1910)

== Personal life ==
Donworth died in Machias, on November 25, 1945, aged 88. Her papers are in the Maine State Library.
