= George Donworth =

American judge (1861–1947)

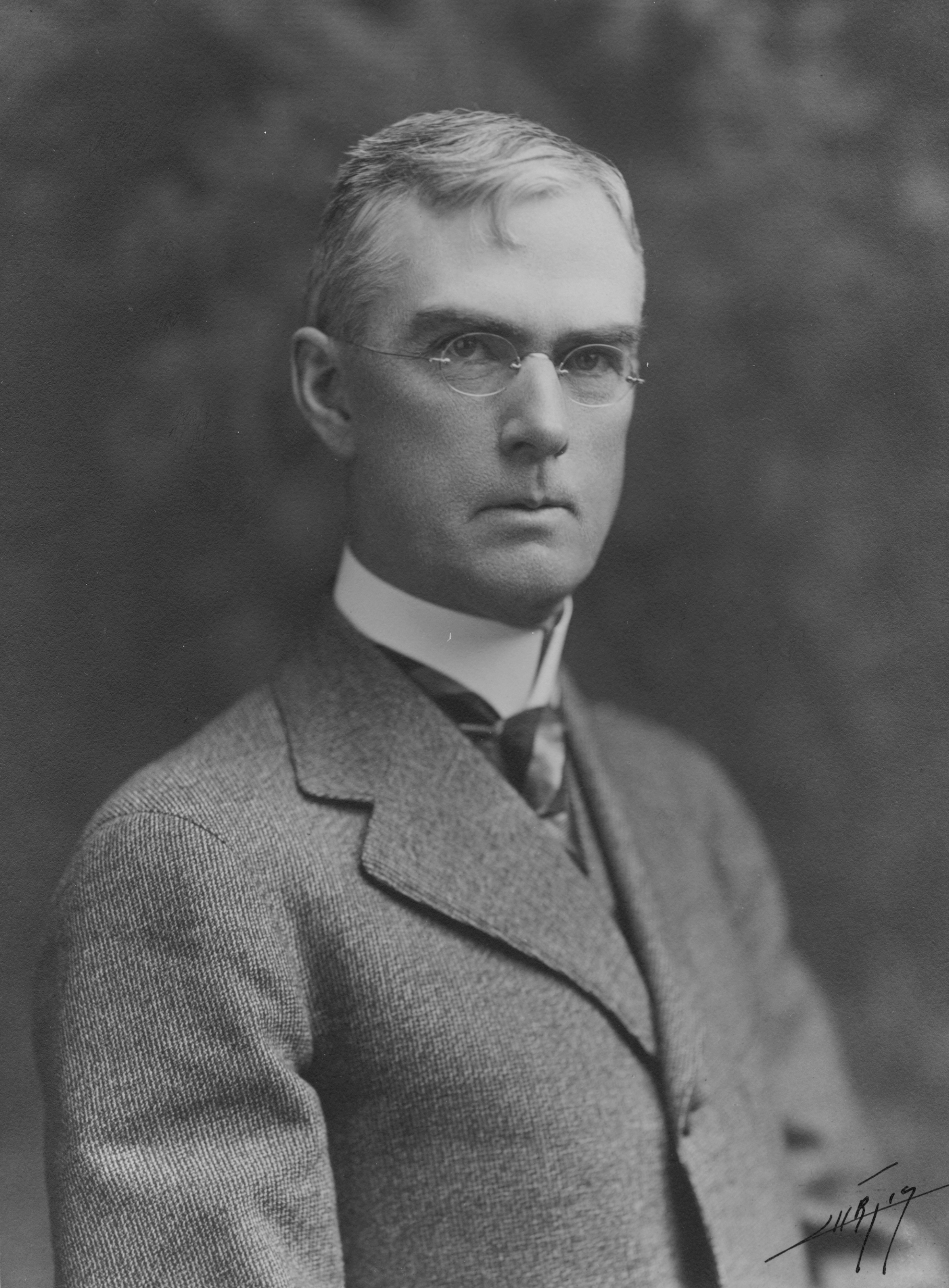

Judge of the United States District Court for the Western District of Washington
- In office May 18, 1909 – March 20, 1912
- Appointed by: William Howard Taft
- Preceded by: Seat established by 35 Stat. 686
- Succeeded by: Edward E. Cushman

Personal details
- Born: George Donworth; November 26, 1861 Machias, Maine, U.S.
- Died: September 6, 1947 (aged 85) Seattle, Washington, U.S.
- Relations: Grace Donworth (sister)
- Education: Georgetown University (A.B.) read law
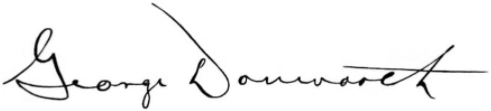
- Signature

George Donworth (November 26, 1861 – September 6, 1947) was a United States district judge of the United States District Court for the Western District of Washington.

== Education and career ==
Donworth was born in Machias, Maine, the son of Patrick Enright Donworth and Mary Eliza Baker Donworth. He received an Artium Baccalaureus degree from Georgetown University in 1881, and read law to enter the bar in 1883. He was in private practice in Fort Fairfield, Maine from 1883 to 1888, and in Seattle, Washington Territory (State of Washington from November 11, 1889) from 1888 to 1909, serving as corporation counsel for Seattle from 1892 to 1894. He was a member of the Seattle School Board from 1907 to 1909.

== Federal judicial service ==
On May 8, 1909, Donworth was nominated by President William Howard Taft to a new seat on the United States District Court for the Western District of Washington created by 35 Stat. 686. He was confirmed by the United States Senate on May 18, 1909, and received his commission the same day. Donworth served in that capacity until his resignation on March 20, 1912.

== Later career and death ==
Donworth returned to private practice in Seattle from 1912 to 1918, when he entered the United States Army, serving until 1922. He thereafter remained in private practice in Seattle from 1922 until his death in that city on September 6, 1947.

== Family ==
Donworth's sister was writer Grace Donworth. His son, Charles T. Donworth, later served as a justice of the Washington Supreme Court.

Legal offices
Preceded by Seat established by 35 Stat. 686	Judge of the United States District Court for the Western District of Washington; 1909–1912	Succeeded by Edward E. Cushman
