= Wamic, Oregon =

Unincorporated community in the state of Oregon, United States

- Census-designated place (CDP)
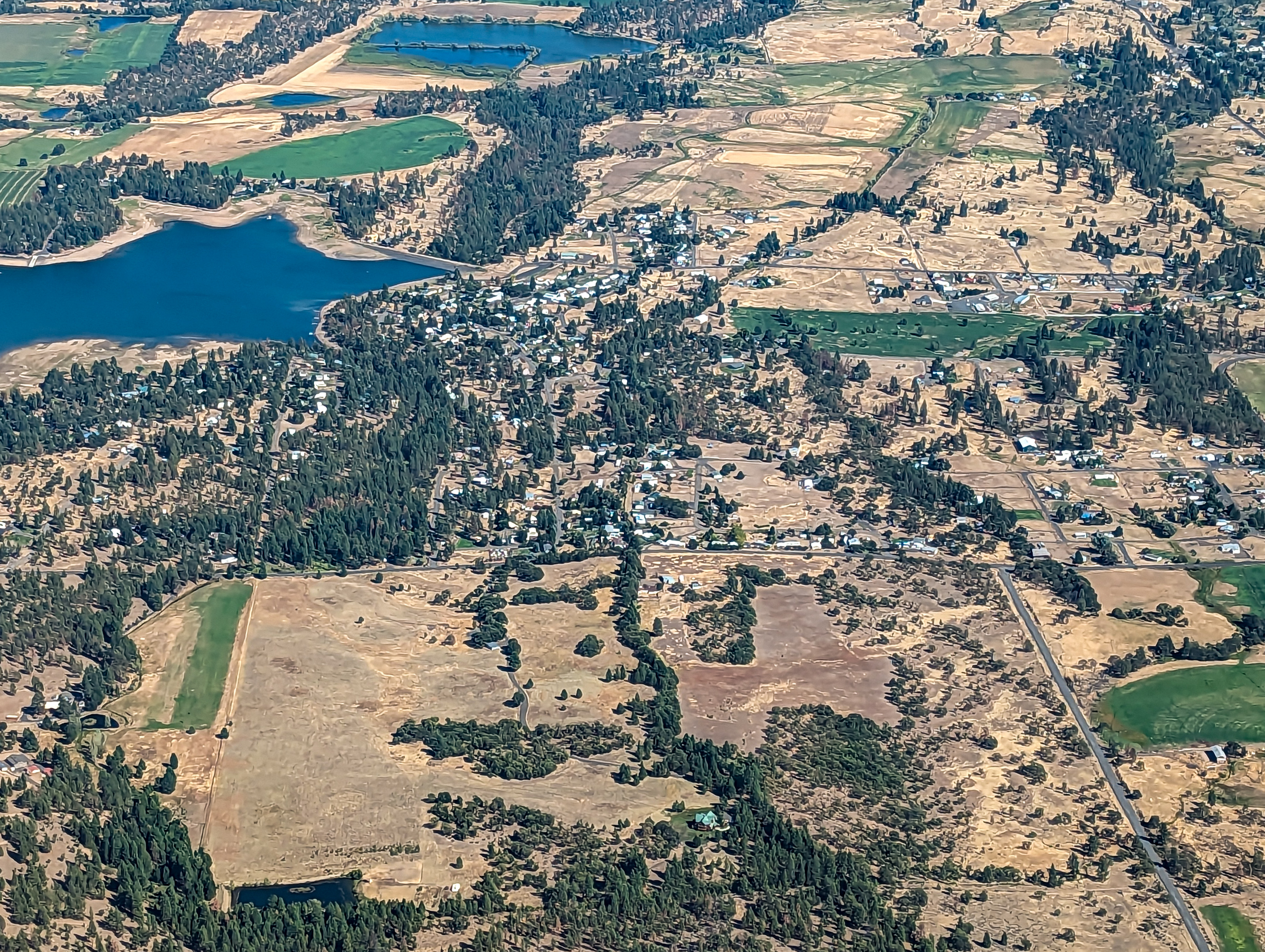
- Aerial photo of Wamic

- Location of Wamic, Oregon
- Coordinates: 45°13′32″N 121°17′34″W
- Country: United States
- State: Oregon
- County: Wasco

Area
  - Total: 1.20 sq mi (3.12 km^{2})
  - Land: 1.20 sq mi (3.12 km^{2})
  - Water: 0 sq mi (0.00 km^{2})
- Elevation: 1,808 ft (551 m)

Population (2020)
  - Total: 123
  - Density: 102.0/sq mi (39.39/km^{2})
- Time zone: UTC-8 (Pacific (PST))
  - Summer (DST): UTC-7 (PDT)
- ZIP code: 97063
- Area codes: 541 and 458
- FIPS code: 41-78300
- GNIS feature ID: 2409529

Wamic is a census-designated place (CDP) and unincorporated community in Wasco County, Oregon, United States. Wamic was named for the Womack family, which settled the area. A post office was established at Wamic in 1884 and it closed in 1958. As of the 2020 census, Wamic had a population of 123.

== Geography ==
According to the United States Census Bureau, the CDP has a total area of 1.2 square miles (3.1 km^{2}), all of it land.

== Demographics ==
Historical population
Census	Pop.	Note	%±
2020	123		—
U.S. Decennial Census

At the 2000 census, there were 36 people, 15 households and 10 families residing in the CDP. The population density was 29.7 inhabitants per square mile (11.5/km^{2}). There were 18 housing units at an average density of 14.9 per square mile (5.7/km^{2}). The racial makeup of the CDP was 97.22% White and 2.78% Native American.

There were 15 households, of which 26.7% had children under the age of 18 living with them, 53.3% were married couples living together, 6.7% had a female householder with no husband present, and 33.3% were non-families. 20.0% of all households were made up of individuals, and 13.3% had someone living alone who was 65 years of age or older. The average household size was 2.40 and the average family size was 2.60.

22.2% of the population were under the age of 18, 5.6% from 18 to 24, 19.4% from 25 to 44, 19.4% from 45 to 64, and 33.3% who were 65 years of age or older. The median age was 48 years. For every 100 females, there were 89.5 males. For every 100 females age 18 and over, there were 75.0 males.

The median household income was $29,375 and the median family income was $35,417. Males had a median income of $35,417 versus $13,750 for females. The per capita income for the CDP was $12,575. There were 22.2% of families and 25.0% of the population living below the poverty line, including 44.4% of under eighteens and none of those over 64.
