= Alaska Innocence Project =

American non-profit organization

- Formation: August 21, 2006
- Type: Non-profit legal organization
- Headquarters: Anchorage, Alaska
- Location: United States
- Executive director: Jory Knott
- Website: Alaska Innocence Project

The Alaska Innocence Project, founded August 21, 2006, is a non-profit organization designed to assist people who have been wrongly convicted and encourage reform to diminish cases of wrongful imprisonment. The project's main beneficiaries have been Gregory Marino and The Fairbanks Four.

== Mission ==
The goals of the Alaska Innocence Project are:

- To identify, investigate, and exonerate individuals who have been wrongly convicted in the state of Alaska.
- To provide educational opportunities for advocates and for the public that foster a culture that champions the defense of the innocent.
- To suggest and implement policies, practices and reforms that will prevent wrongful convictions and hasten the identification and release of innocent persons.

== Leadership ==
The Alaska Innocence Project's Executive Director is Jory Knott. Knott is an attorney in Anchorage, Alaska. The previous Executive Director, William B. Oberly, Esq., was an interviewer in the Judges of Alaska Project Jukebox of the Digital Branch of the University of Alaska Fairbanks Oral History Program.

== Cases ==
=== Gregory Marino ===
The Alaska Innocence Project filed its first court case seeking to establish innocence on April 20, 2009. Gregory Marino was convicted of murder and attempted murder in 1994 and had spent the last 16 years incarcerated on those charges. At the time of his trial, Marino was excluded as the source of all usable prints collected at the crime and could not be positively identified through the then available DNA testing as the source of any biological or forensic evidence found at the crime scene. As a result of the Alaska Innocence Project's filing in this case, the State of Alaska agreed to make evidence available for testing. The State agreed to compare the finger and palm prints from the crime scene to updated data bases to determine if the source of those prints can be identified. Following those results, the State will make biological evidence available for more effective and discerning testing then was available at the time of Marino's trial, to try to determine the source of that evidence. The Alaska Innocence Project is currently attempting to raise funds to pay for this testing which will likely cost at least $20,000. Marino will have to wait for this testing to support his innocence claim until the funds can be raised.

=== The Fairbanks Four ===
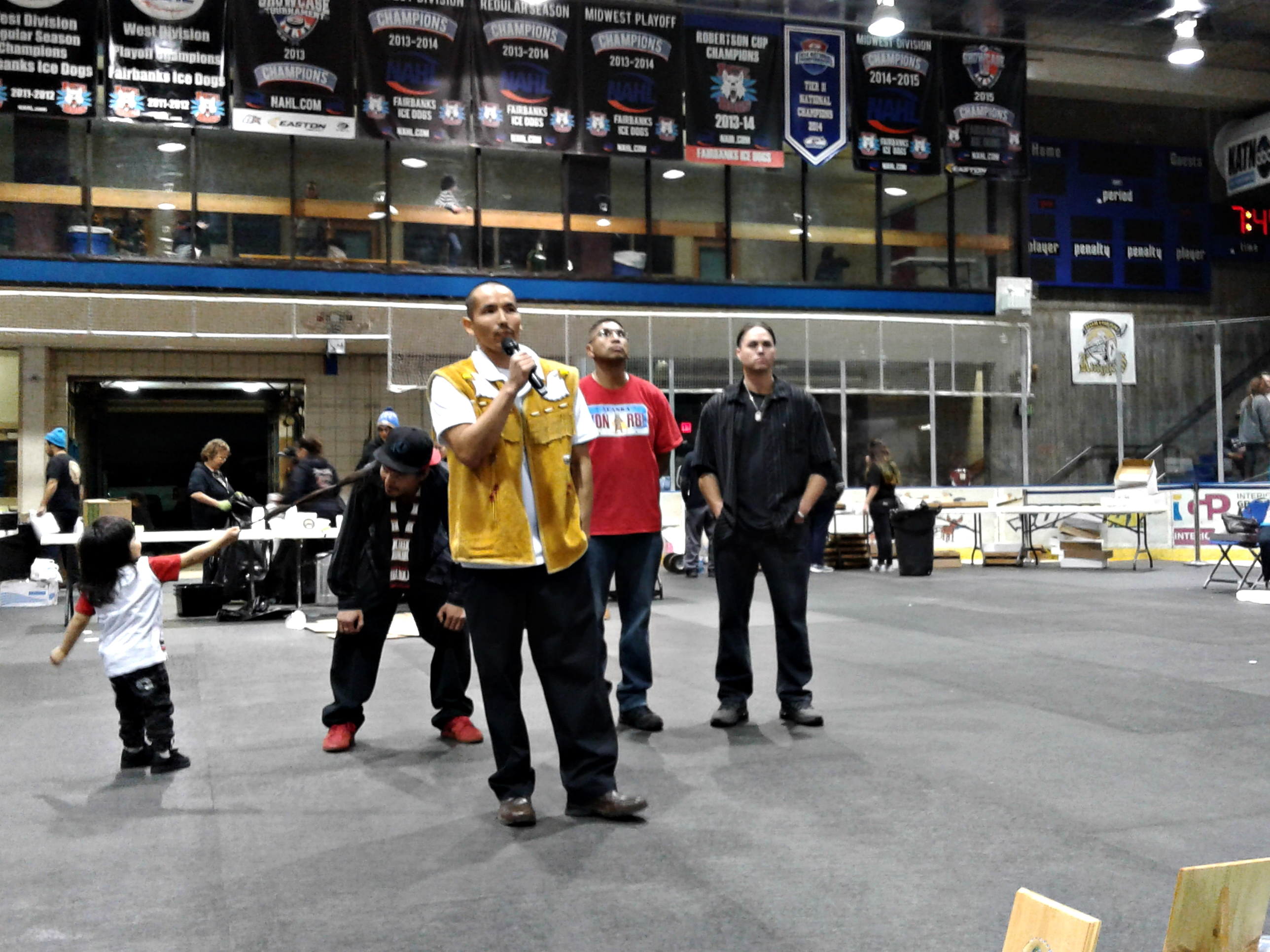
The Fairbanks Four at a potlatch held in their honor at the Big Dipper Ice Arena in Fairbanks on October 19, 2016. Marvin Roberts speaks while (from left) George Frese, Eugene Vent and Kevin Pease stand behind him.

Hours after Alaskan teenager John Hartman was found dead near a street corner in downtown Fairbanks in 1997, police picked up and coerced confessions from two of Hartman's high-school classmates — George Frese and Eugene Vent. During an early-hours interrogation of the two young boys, who were intoxicated and unaccompanied by parents or a lawyer, they were led to believe both Marvin Roberts and Kevin Pease were also involved. Despite the lack of any physical evidence, witnesses, motive or even explanation, all four were convicted of the murder. The group of boys became known as the "Fairbanks Four." In the years following their convictions, Frese and Vent recanted and claimed their confessions were false. In 2013 the Alaska Dispatch reported that Frese, 36; Vent, 33; Roberts, 35; and Pease, 35 "have maintained their innocence in prison ever since, first serving time in Arizona, Colorado, and now back in Alaska." According to new evidence presented by the Alaska Innocence Project, another man — William Holmes — said in a sworn affidavit that he and another group of Fairbanks teenagers killed Hartman. Holmes is serving a life sentence for the murder of two people in California that happened after the Fairbanks crime. One week after the Alaska Innocence Project filed court documents citing new evidence that may suggest that four men who were convicted of the 1997 deadly beating of a classmate are innocent, the Alaska Department of Law ordered an independent review of the case. Following a five-week post conviction relief hearing but before the judge had an opportunity to make a decision, the state negotiated an agreed settlement resulting in the dismissal of the conviction and the freeing of George Freese, Kevin Pease and Eugene Vent on December 17, 2015. The fourth man, Marvin Roberts, had already been released on parole earlier in the year. As part of the agreement, the men agreed to withdraw their claim of prosecutorial misconduct and to not sue the state or the city of Fairbanks.

=== Supporters ===
As of May 2024 the Alaska Innocence Project website notes a list of supporters including Tanana Chiefs Conference, First Alaskans Institute and the Alaska Association of Criminal Defense Lawyers.
