= Rebecca L. Pennell =

American judge (born 1971)

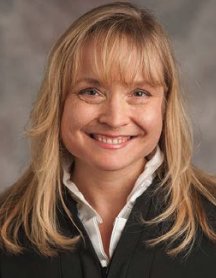

Judge of the United States District Court for the Eastern District of Washington
- Incumbent
- Assumed office December 9, 2024
- Appointed by: Joe Biden
- Preceded by: Salvador Mendoza Jr.

Judge of the Washington Court of Appeals
- In office January 19, 2016 – December 9, 2024
- Appointed by: Jay Inslee
- Preceded by: Stephen Brown
- Succeeded by: Megan K. Murphy

Personal details
- Born: Rebecca Louise Pennell; 1971 (age 54–55) Boulder, Colorado, U.S.
- Education: University of Washington (BA); Stanford University (JD)

Rebecca Louise Pennell (born 1971) is an American lawyer who serves as a United States district judge of the United States District Court for the Eastern District of Washington. She served as a judge of the Washington Court of Appeals from 2016 to 2024.

== Early life ==
Pennell grew up in Richland, Washington, where her father worked at Pacific Northwest National Laboratory and her mother was a math teacher at Columbia Basin College.

== Education ==
Pennell earned a Bachelor of Arts, summa cum laude, from the University of Washington in 1993 and a Juris Doctor from Stanford Law School in 1996.

== Career ==
From 1997 to 1999, she served as a law clerk for Judge Robert H. Whaley of the U.S. District Court for the Eastern District of Washington. From 1999 to 2000, she was a Skadden Fellow at TeamChild, an organization that provides legal services to youths in Yakima, Washington. From 2000 to 2016, she was a public defender with the Federal Defenders of Eastern Washington and Idaho. In January 2016, Governor Jay Inslee appointed her as a judge of the Washington Court of Appeals to fill the vacancy left by the retirement of acting chief judge Stephen Brown. She had a formal investiture ceremony on February 19, 2016. She served in that capacity until 2024, when she became a federal judge.

=== Federal judicial service ===
On March 20, 2024, President Joe Biden announced his intent to nominate Pennell to serve as a United States district judge of the United States District Court for the Eastern District of Washington. On March 21, 2024, her nomination was sent to the Senate. President Biden nominated Pennell to the seat vacated by Judge Salvador Mendoza Jr., who was elevated to the United States Court of Appeals for the Ninth Circuit on September 16, 2022. On April 17, 2024, a hearing on her nomination was held before the Senate Judiciary Committee. On May 9, 2024, her nomination was reported out of committee by an 11–10 party-line vote. On November 19, 2024, the United States Senate invoked cloture on her nomination by a 50–42 vote. The following day, her nomination was confirmed by a 50–48 vote, with Senator Joe Manchin voting against confirmation. She received her judicial commission on December 9, 2024, was sworn in on the same day.

== Personal life ==
Pennell lives in Yakima with her husband and daughter.

Legal offices
Preceded by Salvador Mendoza Jr.	Judge of the United States District Court for the Eastern District of Washington; 2024–present	Incumbent
