= Charles Z. Smith =

American judge

The Honorable Charles Z. Smith

Justice of the Washington Supreme Court
- In office 1988 – 2002
- Nominated by: Booth Gardner

Personal details
- Born: February 23, 1927 Lakeland, Florida
- Died: August 28, 2016 (aged 89) Seattle, Washington
- Spouse: Eleanor M. Smith
- Education: Florida A&M University; Temple University; University of Washington
- Occupation: Special assistant to United States Attorney General; professor; dean; judge

Military service
- Allegiance: United States
- Branch/service: United States Army
- Years of service: 1945-1946
- Battles/wars: World War II

Charles Z. Smith (February 23, 1927 – August 28, 2016) was an American judge who served as a Washington State Supreme Court Justice from 1988 to 2002. He was the first person of color and the first African American to hold the position.

== Early life ==
Smith was born in Lakeland, Florida. His father, John R. Smith, was a Cuban immigrant, and his mother, Eva Love Smith, was an African American whose grandparents were former slaves. Smith was one of eight siblings. During his childhood, he lived in Franklin, North Carolina; Lakeland; and Maitland, Florida.

== Education and military service ==
As a teenager, one of Smith's mentors was William H. Gray Jr., then president of historically black college Florida Normal College. Gray housed Smith and helped him enroll at the college. When Florida state regents fired Gray for refusing to ban black students from all-white colleges, he moved with his family and Smith to Philadelphia. While living in Philadelphia, Smith met Martin Luther King Jr.

Smith attended Temple University until he joined the US Army at age 18 in 1945 despite Gray's wishes. Smith served in the US Air Force and became a military court reporter until 1946. After Smith left the military, Gray encouraged Smith to study law. Smith went on to earn his B.S. from Temple University in 1952. The same year, Smith visited his mother in Seattle and had a chance to show his transcript to the associate dean of University of Washington School of Law. The associate dean immediately admitted Smith to the school. Smith was one of four students of color in his law school of 120 students. He was the only African American in his graduating class in 1955.

== Legal career ==
After graduating from UW School of Law, Smith was unable to find law firms that would interview him. Instead, he worked for Justice Matthew W. Hill. Smith and became the first clerk of color to serve a Washington Supreme Court justice. He then found work as a deputy for King County Prosecutor Charles O. Carroll from 1956 to 1960. Robert F. Kennedy learned of Smith and hired him as a special assistant to the United States Attorney General in 1961. Smith helped the Attorney General investigate fraud related to the Central States Teamsters Pension Fund. Smith left the office to help Kennedy during his run for the United States Senate.

In 1965, Smith returned to Washington and became the state's first African American judge when he was appointed to the Seattle Municipal Court. Governor Dan Evans appointed Smith to the King County Superior Court bench in 1966.

Smith became a professor and associate dean at UW's law school in 1973. As a professor he was a regular commentator on KOMO-TV and radio. He retired from teaching in 1983 as professor emeritus and from the Marine Corps Reserve with the rank of lieutenant colonel in 1986.

=== Supreme Court ===
Washington State Governor Booth Gardner appointed Smith to the state Supreme Court in 1988. Smith was re-elected three times, always unopposed, and served for a total of 14 years. He recalled that from 1990 to 1993, a group of his colleagues on his court harassed him in an attempt to get him to resign. While he was a justice, he was a chair on the American Bar Association Task Force on Minorities in the Judiciary, Judicial Division. He also served on the National Consortium of Task Forces and Commissions on Racial and Ethnic Bias until 1999. President Bill Clinton appointed Smith to the US Commission on International Religious Freedom in 1999. He was on the commission until his retirement in 2002. He was the longest-serving justice on the Washington Supreme Court at the time.

== Views ==
Smith was a civil rights advocate who worked to increase the number of women and people of color in the legal profession. He was critical of how the Washington State justices' demographics did not reflect the state's racial diversity. He and his wife, Eleanor Martinez, became spokespeople for the redress of Japanese Americans who were subject to internment in the 1960s. Smith provided legal advice to redress activists in the 1970s and 1980s, and became a board member of the Seattle Chapter of the Japanese American Citizens League. He was also concerned with immigration equality and Latino communities.

Smith was president of the American Baptist Churches in 1976 and was a supporter of freedom of religion on a global scale. As part of the U.S. Commission on International Religious Freedom, he took particular interest in religious persecution occurring in China, Egypt, India, and Pakistan.

Smith was registered as a member of the Republican Party in the 1950s, which was a requirement in order to work for prosecutor Charles O. Carroll.

== Legacy ==
The Student Bar Association at the UW School of Law named the Charles Z. Smith Public Service Scholarship after Smith. Pioneer Human Service also named a low-cost housing location after him.

== Personal life ==
Smith and Eleanor "Elie" Jane Martinez married in 1955. They had four children who currently reside in Seattle. Smith died on August 28, 2016, at his home in Seattle, Washington.

== See also ==
- List of African-American jurists
- List of first minority male lawyers and judges in Virginia

Legal offices
Preceded by	Associate Justice of the Washington Supreme Court; 1988–2002	Succeeded by Mary Fairhurst
