= Charles T. Donworth =

American judge (1892–1976)

Charles Tenney Donworth (February 15, 1892 – June 10, 1976) was a justice of the Washington Supreme Court from September 12, 1949 to December 31, 1967.

== Early life, education, and career ==
Born in Seattle, Washington, to prominent attorney George Donworth, who later became a United States federal judge, Donworth attended Andover Academy (later called Phillips Academy) in Massachusetts and received an undergraduate degree from Yale University in 1914, followed by a law degree from the University of Washington School of Law in 1916.

Donworth served in the United States Army during World War I, and "practiced law in Seattle for 33 years".

== Judicial service ==
On August 29, 1949, Governor Arthur B. Langlie announced the appointment of Donworth to a seat on the state supreme court to succeed retiring justice William J. Steinert. Following his appointment to the court in 1949, Donworth was re-elected to the seat in 1950, 1956 and 1962, and was also designated chief justice in 1956. Donworth served on the court until 1968, having retired effective December 31, 1967, pursuant to a Washington law "requiring the judges to retire at the end of the year in which they become 70".

== Personal life and death ==
In 1918, Donworth married Evelyn Carey, daughter of a prominent Washington judge, with whom he had a son and a daughter. Evelyn died after an illness in 1934, at the age of 41. Donworth then married Dorothy Lee Griffin of Fresno, California, in 1945. Donworth died in a hospital in Olympia at the age of 84.

Political offices
Preceded by William J. Steinert	Justice of the Washington Supreme Court; 1949–1967	Succeeded by Walter T. McGovern
