= Lewis B. Schwellenbach =

American judge and politician

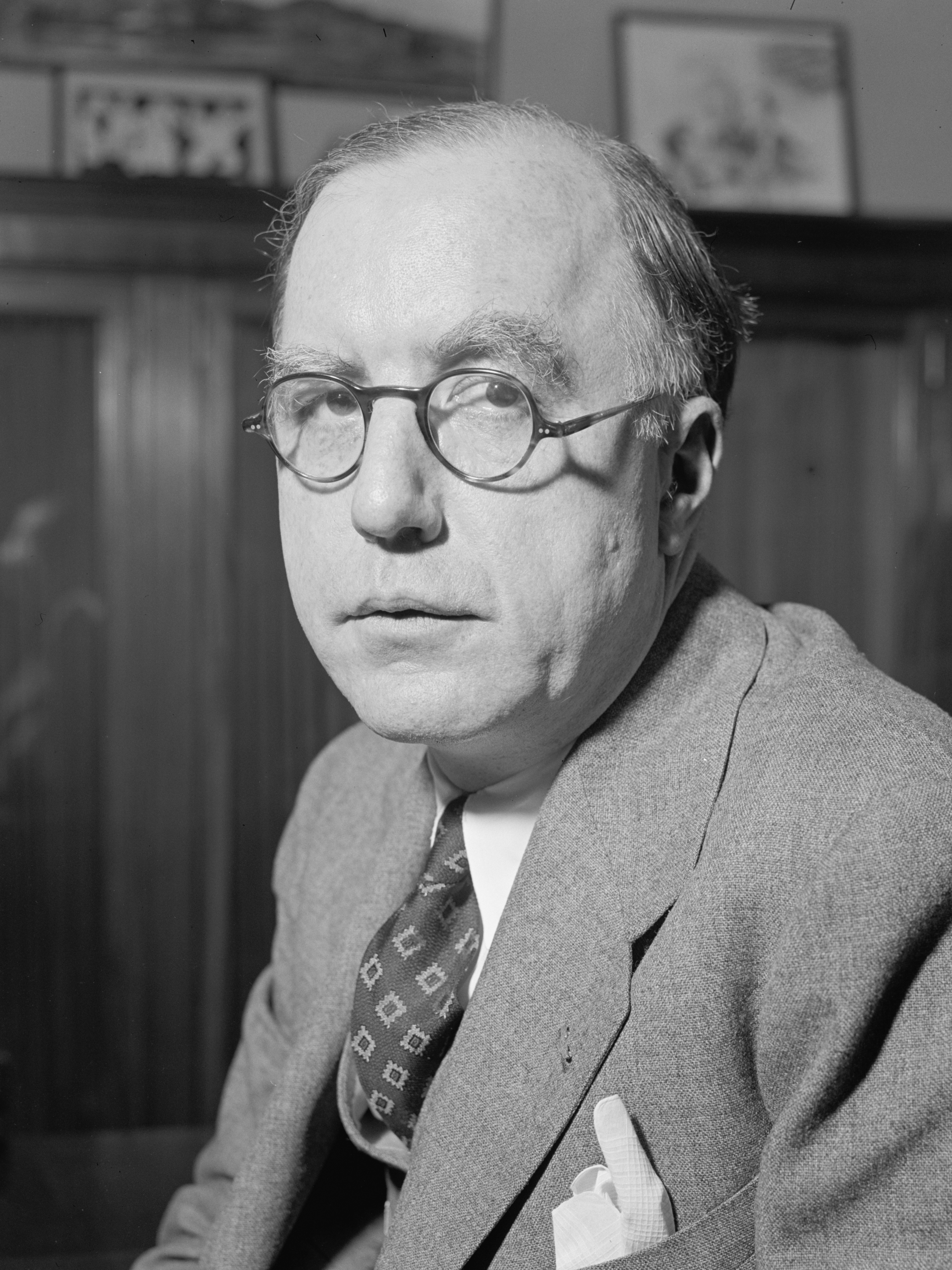
- Schwellenbach in 1940

5th United States Secretary of Labor
- In office July 1, 1945 – June 10, 1948
- President: Harry S. Truman
- Preceded by: Frances Perkins
- Succeeded by: Maurice J. Tobin

Judge of the United States District Court for the Eastern District of Washington
- In office November 20, 1940 – June 30, 1945
- Appointed by: Franklin D. Roosevelt
- Preceded by: J. Stanley Webster
- Succeeded by: Samuel Marion Driver

United States Senator from Washington
- In office January 3, 1935 – December 16, 1940
- Preceded by: Clarence Dill
- Succeeded by: Monrad Wallgren

Personal details
- Born: Lewis Baxter Schwellenbach; September 20, 1894 Superior, Wisconsin
- Died: June 10, 1948 (aged 53) Washington, D.C.
- Resting place: Washelli Cemetery; Seattle, Washington
- Party: Democratic
- Spouse: Anne Duffy (m. 1935)
- Education: University of Washington (LLB)

Military service
- Allegiance: United States
- Branch/service: United States Army
- Years of service: 1918-1919
- Rank: Corporal
- Unit: 12th Infantry Regiment, 8th Infantry Division
- Battles/wars: World War I

Lewis Baxter Schwellenbach (September 20, 1894 – June 10, 1948) was a United States senator from Washington, a United States district judge of the United States District Court for the Eastern District of Washington and the 5th U.S. secretary of labor.

== Background ==
Born on September 20, 1894, in Superior, Douglas County, Wisconsin, Schwellenbach moved to Spokane, Washington with his parents in 1902, attending the Spokane elementary and high schools. He received a Bachelor of Laws in 1917 from the University of Washington School of Law. He was an assistant instructor at the University of Washington from 1916 to 1917.

== Career ==
Schwellenbach entered service during World War I as a Private in the 12th Infantry Regiment of the United States Army in 1918 until his discharge as a corporal in 1919. He was admitted to the bar and practiced in Seattle, Washington from 1919 to 1935. Schwellenbach served as state commander of the American Legion and president of the University of Washington's alumni association, and was a delegate to numerous county and state conventions. His prominence as a result of these leadership roles caused the Democratic Party to consider him for state offices including attorney general and governor. He was an unsuccessful candidate for nomination for Governor of Washington in 1932.

=== Congressional service ===
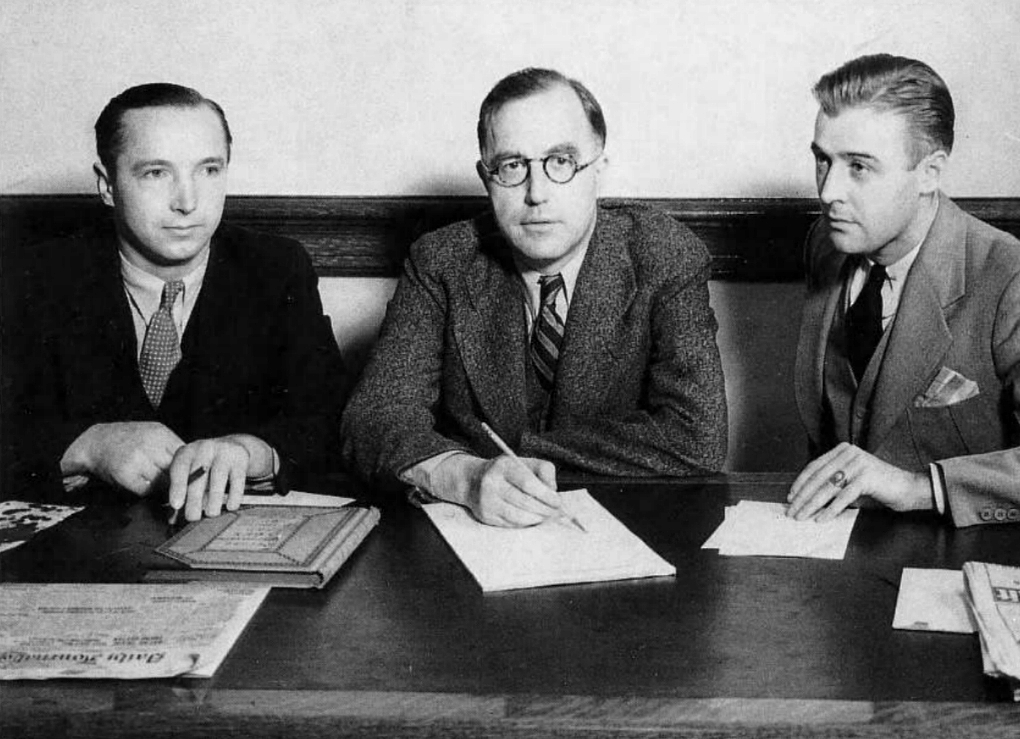
Washington State Democratic Party standard-bearers, 1934. (L-R): Marion Zioncheck, Lewis Schwellenbach, Warren Magnuson.

Schwellenbach was elected as a Democrat to the United States Senate and served from January 3, 1935, to December 16, 1940, when he resigned. He was not a candidate for renomination in 1940, having been appointed to the federal bench. He was a delegate to the Inter-Parliamentary Union at The Hague, Netherlands in 1938.

=== Federal judicial service ===
Schwellenbach was nominated by President Franklin D. Roosevelt on May 6, 1940, to a seat on the United States District Court for the Eastern District of Washington vacated by Judge J. Stanley Webster. He was confirmed by the United States Senate on May 6, 1940, and received his commission on November 20, 1940. His service terminated on June 30, 1945, due to his resignation to become Secretary of Labor.

=== Secretary of Labor ===
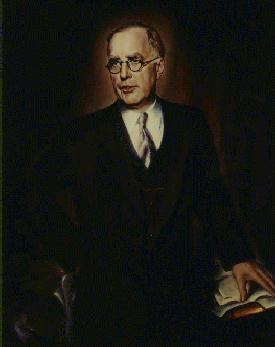
The official portrait of Lewis B. Schwellenbach hangs in the Department of Labor

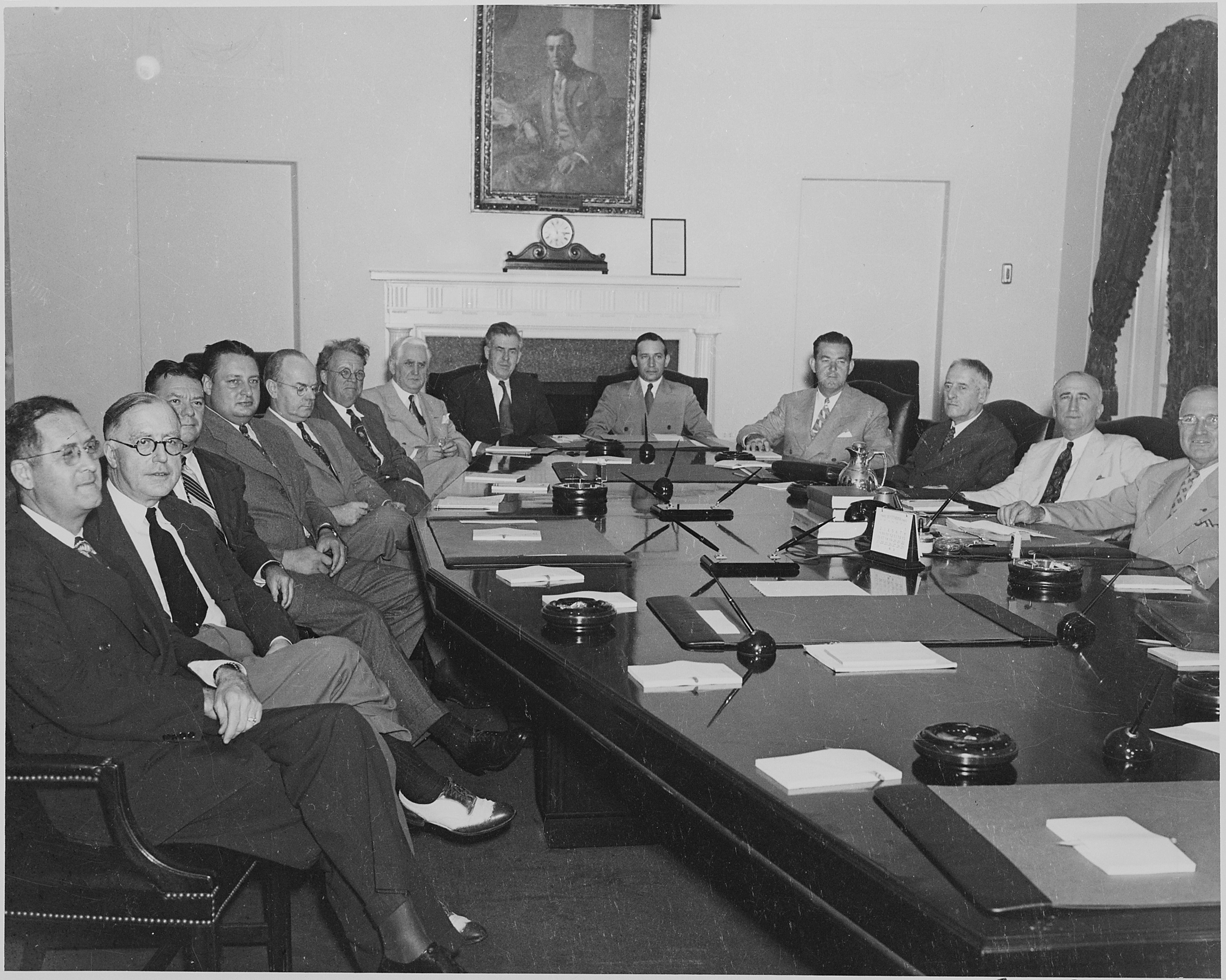
Schwellenbach (2nd from left) at a meeting of the Truman cabinet, (August 1945).

Schwellenbach was appointed United States Secretary of Labor by President Harry S. Truman and served from July 1, 1945, until his death in Walter Reed Army Medical Center in Washington, D.C., on June 10, 1948. He was interred in Washelli Cemetery in Seattle.

During Schwellenbach's tenure as Secretary, fear of post-war unemployment brought the United States Congress to pass the Employment Act of 1946, which made promotion of maximum employment the Nation's top priority. Schwellenbach promoted abolition of wartime wage and price controls. He had to deal with a post-war wave of strikes. The Republican 80th United States Congress passed the Taft–Hartley Act. Staff cuts were made at the United States Department of Labor. The U.S. Conciliation Service was removed from the Department of Labor and established as the independent Federal Mediation and Conciliation Service (FMCS). During his term, the Department's international work was institutionalized; the Office of International Labor Affairs (now the Bureau of International Labor Affairs) was established as a unit in the Office of the Secretary.

== Personal life and death ==
Schwellenbach's brother, Edgar W. Schwellenbach, served as a Justice of the Washington Supreme Court.

He married Anne Duffy in 1935 and they remained together until his death in 1948.

Schwellenbach died on June 10, 1948. He was buried at Washelli Cemetery in Seattle.

Party political offices
Preceded by Clarence Dill	Democratic nominee for United States Senator from Washington (Class 1); 1934	Succeeded by Monrad Wallgren
U.S. Senate
Preceded by Clarence Dill	United States Senator (Class 1) from Washington; 1935–1940; Served alongside: Homer Bone	Succeeded by Monrad Wallgren
Legal offices
Preceded by J. Stanley Webster	Judge of the United States District Court for the Eastern District of Washington; 1940–1945	Succeeded by Samuel Marion Driver
Political offices
Preceded by Frances Perkins	United States Secretary of Labor; 1945–1948	Succeeded by Maurice J. Tobin
