= William J. Wilkins (judge) =

American judge

William John Wilkins (September 1, 1897 – September 9, 1995) was an American lawyer and judge from the state of Washington. He was the last surviving judge of the post-World War II Nuremberg Trials of Nazi war crimes.

Wilkins was born in Michigan, the fifth of nine children of a miner from Cornwall, England. He went to work in the copper mines at 14 to help support his family when his father became ill.

He served in the United States Army in World War I as a Sergeant, receiving a battlefield commission to Second Lieutenant. He was awarded a Silver Star in the Meuse-Argonne Offensive in the fall of 1918.

He completed high school after the war and worked his way through the University of Michigan. He obtained his law degree from George Washington University Law School in Washington, D.C. He was invited to Seattle by a classmate and settled there, passing the Washington State bar and marrying the daughter of a Yakima rancher.

Wilkins was King County deputy prosecutor from 1929 to 1934, and then went into private practice until 1940, when he was appointed a King County Superior Court judge. At the outbreak of World War II, Wilkins re-enlisted in the Army and served in the Judge Advocate General's Corps.

In 1951, Wilkins presided over the infamous libel trial against author Betty MacDonald, brought by nine people who claimed to be the Kettle family MacDonald wrote about in her best-selling book, The Egg and I. Much to Judge Wilkins' surprise, the jury sided with MacDonald, something Wilkins discussed in his autobiography, The Sword and the Gavel, which he published in 1981.
