= National Bureau of Asian Research =

American nonprofit, research institution

- Abbreviation: NBR
- Formation: 1989; 37 years ago
- Type: Think Tank
- Headquarters: One Union Square, Suite 1012; 600 University Street; Seattle, WA 98101
- Location: Seattle, Washington, U.S. Washington, D.C., U.S.
- President: Roy Kamphausen
- Website: nbr.org

The National Bureau of Asian Research (NBR) is an American non-profit research institution based in Seattle, Washington, with a branch office in Washington, D.C.

NBR brings together specialists, policymakers, and business leaders to examine economic, strategic, political, globalization, health, and energy issues affecting U.S. relations with East, Central, Southeast and South Asia and Russia. Its mission is to inform and strengthen Asian-Pacific policy.

Funding for NBR's research comes from NBR itself, foundations, corporations, government departments and agencies, and individuals.

== Early history ==
Established in 1989, NBR is a legacy organization of Senator Henry M. Jackson. During the 1970s, Senator Jackson had raised the need for a "National Sino-Soviet Center" in conversations with Kenneth B. Pyle, director of the University of Washington Henry M. Jackson School of International Studies. He then enlisted Edward Carlson, president and CEO of United Airlines, and Thornton Wilson, CEO of the Boeing Company, to assist in creating an institution that would bridge the gap between those responsible for foreign policy decision making and the specialists located in universities and research institutes in the U.S. and abroad.

Seven years after Jackson's death, the National Bureau of Asian and Soviet Research was officially established with grants from the Henry M. Jackson Foundation and The Boeing Company. Kenneth B. Pyle served as the organization's founding president.

In 1992, the organization dropped "and Soviet" to become The National Bureau of Asian Research.

== Research programs ==
=== Political and Security Affairs ===
The Political and Security Affairs (PSA) group conducts innovative, forward-looking policy research on a range of Asian political security issues with a particular focus on strategic studies, with the Strategic Asia Program; China security issues; U.S. national security, with the Shalikashvili Chair; and politics and leadership through the Pyle Center.

=== Trade, Economic, and Energy Affairs ===
NBR's Trade, Economic, and Energy Affairs (TEEA) group examines market and policy questions for the Asian-Pacific, with a focus on three broad areas: energy security and policy; energy and the environment; and trade, investment, and economic engagement. Over the years, TEEA has undertaken major research initiatives on a broad range of topics, including energy and environmental security, China's IP and innovation policies, Islamic finance, and the status of Myanmar's domestic and foreign policy reforms. The group's longest ongoing initiative is its Energy Security Program, which since 2004 has examined major developments in Asian energy markets and implications for geopolitics.

Through TEEA, NBR also serves as the Secretariat of the Pacific Energy Summit, an invitation-only event that describes itself as "conven[ing] leaders from government, business, and research to explore innovative solutions to the dual challenges of rising energy demand and a changing climate." Past program speakers have included Louisiana congressman Charles Boustany, former U.S. Under Secretary of State for Economic Growth, Energy, and the Environment Robert Hormats, and Melody Meyer of Chevron. Each year, the Summit is held in a different location across the Asia-Pacific, with past sites including Tokyo, Jakarta, Hanoi, and Vancouver, among others.

=== Center for Health and Aging ===
The Center for Health and Aging was established in 2003. Michael P. Birt, then director of NBR's Center for Health and Aging, George F. Russell Jr., chairman of The National Bureau of Asian Research, Leland H. Hartwell, president of the Fred Hutchinson Cancer Research Center, and William H. Gates Sr., co-chair of the Bill & Melinda Gates Foundation, met in 2004 to discuss the need for prevention, detection, and treatment of illness early enough to reduce the human and financial cost of disease. Plans to organize and host a Pacific Health Summit in Seattle, Washington, emerged from those discussions. George F. Russell Jr. and William H. Gates Sr. co-chaired an advisory group, provided the seed funding for the Pacific Health Summit, and were keynote speakers at the inaugural Pacific Health Summit, which was convened in 2005 by two co-sponsoring organizations, Fred Hutchinson Cancer Research Center and NBR's Center for Health and Aging. Subsequent annual Pacific Health Summits were co-presented by the Fred Hutchinson Cancer Research Center, Bill & Melinda Gates Foundation, the Wellcome Trust, and The National Bureau of Asian Research, which served as the Summit's secretariat from its founding. The world health leaders and top corporate executives attending this invitation-only event have been referred to as "global health luminaries." Since NBR concluded the annual meeting in 2012, the focus of the Center for Health and Aging has shifted from an annual meeting to more targeted work that builds on the summit's past themes and concrete outcomes.

=== John M. Shalikashvili Chair in National Security Studies ===
In 2006, NBR endowed the John M. Shalikashvili Chair in National Security Studies. The chair recognizes General John Shalikashvili, former Chairman of the Joint Chiefs of Staff, for his 39 years of military service to the United States, years of leadership on the NBR Board of Directors, and his role as senior advisor to NBR's Strategic Asia Program. The stated mission of the chair is to provide a "distinguished scholar in the national security field with an opportunity to inform, strengthen, and shape the understanding of U.S. policymakers on critical current and long-term national security issues related to the Asia-Pacific." The inaugural holder, Dennis C. Blair, was appointed in 2009 by President Obama to serve as the Director of National Intelligence. In September 2010, former Commander of the U.S. Pacific Command Thomas B. Fargo came on as the second chair holder. On March 3, 2016, the National Bureau of Asian Research announced that Admiral Greenert (ret.) would become the third holder of the John M. Shalikashvili Chair in National Security Studies (Shali Chair) at NBR.[7] At NBR, Admiral Greenert brings to bear his years of experience in the U.S. Navy to help inform policy debates on critical issues pertaining to the Asia-Pacific through briefings of senior leaders, and research and writing.

=== Kenneth B. and Anne H.H. Pyle Center for Northeast Asian Studies ===
In 2006, NBR created the Kenneth B. and Anne H.H. Pyle Center for Northeast Asian Studies, named in honor of NBR's founding president and his wife. The Pyle Center conducts research on Northeast Asia to advance the comprehensive study of the region, particularly as it pertains to its security, political, and economic dynamics.

=== Slade Gorton International Policy Center ===
In 2010, NBR launched the Slade Gorton International Policy Center, named in honor of United States Senator Slade Gorton who served as majority leader of the Washington State House of Representatives, for three terms as state attorney general, and for three terms as United States Senator. The Gorton Center incorporates and builds on current projects in the areas of economics and trade at NBR as well as addressing the issues central to Slade's work on the 9/11 Commission, focusing on how America organizes internally to protect the country from outside threats.

=== National Asia Research Program ===
From 2009 to 2011, NBR and the Woodrow Wilson International Center for Scholars partnered to launch the National Asia Research Program (NARP), a national research and conference program designed to reinvigorate and promote the policy-relevant study of Asia. In April 2010, the program selected a premier group of National Asia Research Associates and Fellows, nominated by U.S. research organizations and higher learning institutions with top programs on Asia.

== Publications ==
NBR publishes books, peer-reviewed journals, and occasional reports. Since 2001, NBR has published the annual edited volume Strategic Asia, which incorporates assessments of economic, political, and military trends and focuses on the strategies that drive policy in the region through a combination of country, regional, and topical studies authored by Asia studies specialists and international relations experts. Ashley J. Tellis, a senior associate of the Carnegie Endowment for International Peace, has served as the research director for the Strategic Asia Program. Since January 2006, NBR has published Asia Policy, a quarterly journal that presents academic research on the Asia-Pacific with a focus on policy conclusions for the United States. Loyola Marymount University Asian studies professor Thomas Plate has described the Asia Policy board of editorial advisers as a "virtual Who's Who in the field of Asian policy scholarship."

== Governance ==
Board of Directors

- Chair: John V. Rindlaub, Regional President (Ret.), Wells Fargo Asia Pacific
- Chair emeritus: George F. Russell Jr., chairman emeritus, Russell Investment
- Vice chair: Thomas W. Albrecht, Partner (Ret.), Sidley Austin LLP
- Vice chair: Kurt Glaubitz, General Manager, Corporate Affairs, Asia Pacific Exploration and Production, Chevron Corporation
- Treasurer: Quentin W. Kuhrau, Chairman of the Board and Chief Executive Officer, Unico
- Roger W. Bowlin, Founder and Managing Partner, Real Estate Transition Solutions
- Richard J. Ellings, President Emeritus and Counselor (in residence), The National Bureau of Asian Research
- LTG (ret) Charles W. Hooper, Senior Counselor, The Cohen Group
- Roy Kamphausen, President, The National Bureau of Asian Research
- Nobukatsu Kanehara, Professor, Doshisha University
- Ryo Kubota, Chairman, President, and Chief Executive Officer, Kubota Vision Inc.
- Melody Meyer, President, Melody Meyer Energy LLC
- Rear Adm. (ret) Huan Nguyen, Senior Advisor, Naval Sea Systems Command
- Long Nguyen, Chairman, President, and CEO, Pragmatics, Inc.
- Kenneth B. Pyle, Henry M. Jackson Professor Emeritus, University of Washington; Founding President, The National Bureau of Asian Research
- William Rademaker, Entrepreneur, Duthie Hill LLC
- Jonathan Roberts, Founder & Partner, Ignition Partners
- Tom Robertson, Corporate Vice President and Deputy General Counsel, Microsoft
- Joseph E. Tofalo, Vice President, Engagement and Customer Affairs, Huntington Ingalls Industries
- Mitchell B. Waldman, Principal, M Barnet Advisors LLC

Counselors and Chairs

- Charlene Barshefsky, U.S. Trade Representative (ret.)
- Charles W. Boustany Jr., U.S. House of Representatives (ret.)
- Norm Dicks, senior policy advisor, Van Ness Feldman, LLP, former United States Congressman
- Thomas B. Fargo, Admiral, U.S. Navy (retired)
- Aaron L. Friedberg, Princeton University
- Jonathan W. Greenert, Admiral, U.S. Navy (ret.), John M. Shalikashvili Chair in National Security Studies, The National Bureau of Asian Research
- Joseph Lieberman, senior counsel, Kastowitz, Benson, Torres & Friedman, former United States Senator
- Ashley J. Tellis, Carnegie Endowment for International Peace

Board of Advisors

- William B. Abnett
- Se Hyun Ahn
- Dennis C. Blair, Admiral, U.S. Navy (ret.)
- Ketty Chen
- Josh Corless
- Linda M. Distlerath
- Nicholas Eberstadt
- Karl Eikenberry
- Bates Gill
- Clara Gillispie
- Stephen E. Hanson
- Harry Harding (political scientist)
- Mikkal E. Herberg
- Carla Anderson Hills
- Robert Holleyman
- Chun In-Bum
- Mark Jones
- Amit Kapoor
- Tariq A. Karim
- Heino Klinck
- David M. Lampton
- Nicholas R. Lardy
- Stephen Lanza
- Richard Lawless
- William C. McCahill Jr.
- Meredith Miller
- John S. Park
- Pamela Passman
- Rajeswari Pillai Rajagopalan
- Clarine Nardi Riddle
- Ryo Sahashi
- Ulrike Schaede
- Robert Scher
- David Shambaugh
- Benjamin Shobert
- Travis Sullivan
- Travis Tanner
- Arzan Tarapore
- Jessica C. Teets
- Dana White
