= William H. Gates Hall =

Building on the campus of the University of Washington

Coordinates: 47.659273°N 122.310891°W

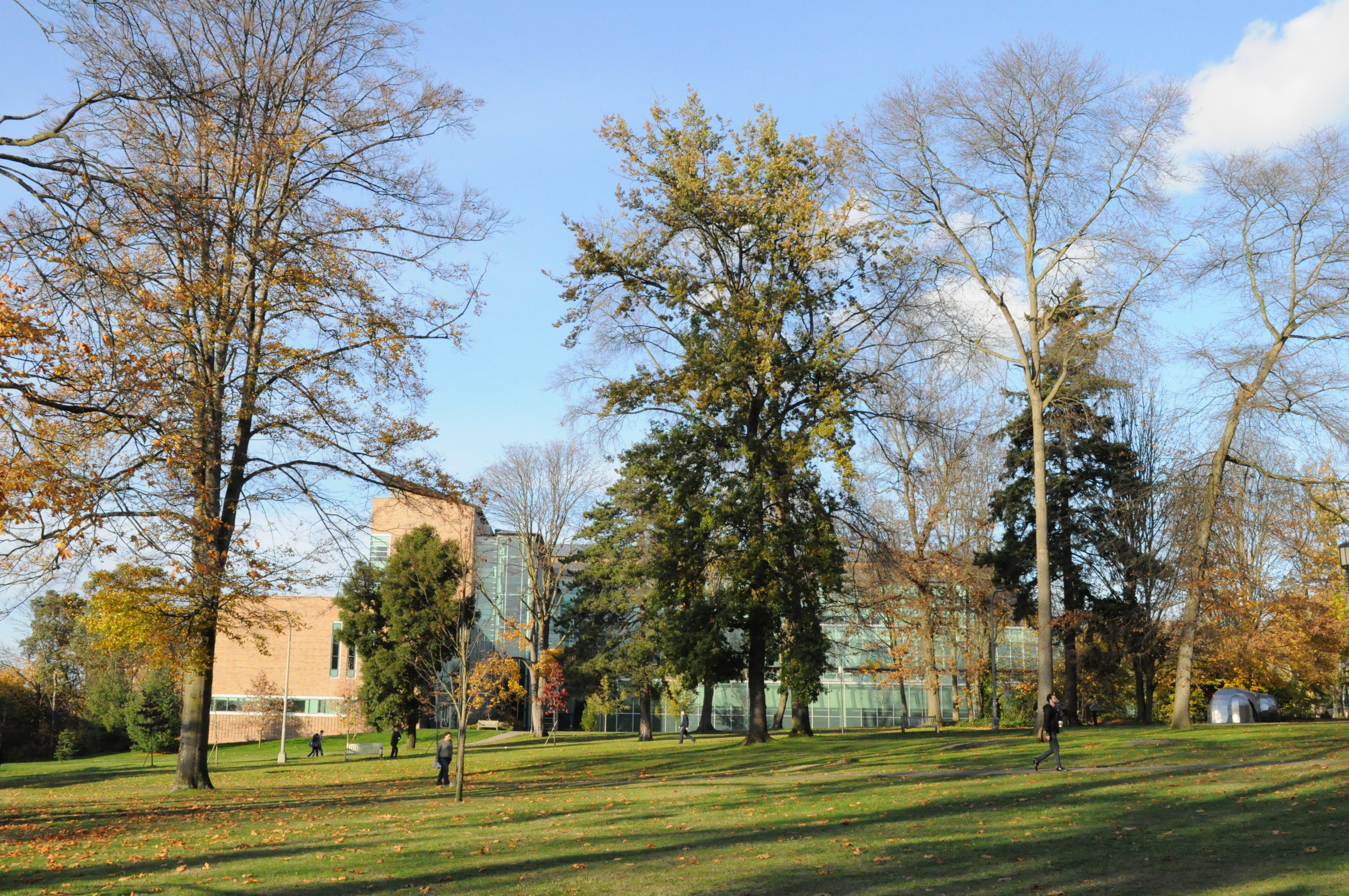
William H. Gates Hall as seen from Parrington Lawn

William H. Gates Hall is an academic building of the University of Washington in Seattle, Washington. William H. Gates Hall houses the University of Washington School of Law. The building is named after the late William H. Gates, Sr., a lawyer who served as a partner of the Preston Gates & Ellis law firm. Gates was a 1950 graduate of the UW School of Law.

== History ==
=== Conception and planning ===
Before the construction of Gates Hall, the University of Washington School of Law, the only public law school in the State of Washington, occupied Condon Hall, located away from the main campus of UW. The building never expanded, so as the UW School of Law grew, various departments of the law school were forced to occupy other buildings.

The Washington State Legislature, on two occasions, failed to provide the funds to expand the Condon building. At a later point the university decided that it could build a new administrative services building and then store extra administrative services that were previously spread across the university campus at Condon Hall. The university would use the cost savings to allow it to build a new law school.

In 1993 the Washington State Legislature gave the university funds to design a new law building. After university officials began a search for potential donors, William Henry "Bill Gates III offered to be a donor. He was interested in naming a building after his father William Henry Gates, Sr. In 1995 the state legislature approved the building of a new law facility. The state legislature approved a funding for $1.1 million for the building design. It was conditional on the University being able to, by July 1, 1997, raise $10 million from private sources.

Around 1996, when the project had conditional funding but no final approval, several critics, including academics and University District residents opposed the proposed building plan, arguing that UW was breaking its agreement with the city over how the UW campus should be developed, that it would remove one of the few remaining open spaces on campus, that it was a bad spending of educational dollars during a budget crisis, and that the project was "leapfrogged" over higher priority projects. The university originally planned to construct a replacement law facility on Parrington Green, but after outcry that lead to almost 600 e-mail messages expressing disfavor with the plan being sent during the first twelve days of February 1996, an administration committee revealed a revised plan that would reduce the building's footprint by about a third of the original plan, saving more of the park. The university later changed the location to the N1 Parking Lot, near the Burke Museum. This decision prevented the destruction of a group of trees, and in the words of Sherri Olson of the Seattle Post-Intelligencer, "define[d] a new quad."

In 1999 the legislature approved the funding of the construction of the facility. The replacement law school facility was approved so the law school could again occupy a central location in the UW campus.

=== Funding ===
The state funded the construction with $44.2 million of money from bond sales and $1.5 million of funds directly from the state, while $34.3 million came from private donations. The University of Washington stated that it was "an exceptionally large share for a public building." The state bond money would be repaid by the university's Metropolitan Tract revenues, instead of tax-supported bonds.

More than 160 donors contributed to the building. William H. Gates, Sr.'s son, William Henry "Bill" Gates III, and his wife Melinda Gates, under the Gates Foundation, donated $12 million to the UW School of Law. The Gates couple was the largest private donor to the William H. Gates Hall project. The donations ranged from $50 to the Gates Foundation's $12 million.

=== Construction and opening ===
Kohn Pedersen Fox, an architecture firm in New York City, collaborated with Mahlum Architects on the design of the building. Lease Crutcher Lewis of Seattle served as the general contractor-construction manager. Gates Hall was built and constructed for $80 million. The cost included fiber optics and furniture.

Its groundbreaking occurred on May 4, 2001. The individuals presiding over the ceremony, which took place at the future law school site, included Richard McCormick, President of UW, and Roland Hjorth, the then-outgoing dean of the UW Law School. Visitors included Bill Gates, former U.S. Speaker of the House Tom Foley, Governor of Washington Gary Locke, and Dr. Joe Knight Jr., the appointed future dean of the UW School of Law.

Its public opening and dedication occurred on September 12, 2003. Upon completion of the building, the school of law moved from Condon Hall to William H. Gates Hall. All of the departments of the law school moved to Gates Hall, allowing for the entirety of the law school to occupy one building. The building was planned to be one-third larger than Condon Hall, and it has 55% more space than the previous facility. The opening of the William H. Gates building also allowed the law school department to increase in size. In 2001, when the school was still based in Condon Hall, the law school was annually receiving at least 1,500 applicants for 165 slots.

== Location ==
It at the northwestern corner of the University of Washington campus, near the historic campus core. William H. Gates Hall is located south of the Burke Museum of Natural History and Culture, and north of Parrington Green. The facility is between 15th Avenue Northeast and Memorial Way. Gates Hall, located in the center of the University District, is off of "The Ave" and north of Downtown Seattle. It is in proximity to the legal community of Seattle and various university student life facilities.

Paula Littlewood, the University of Washington School of Law assistant dean, said in 2001 that the central location of Gates Hall would enhance the law school's collaboration with other UW academic programs, and increase the ability of students and faculty to work together. Sherri Olson of the Seattle Post-Intelligencer said that William H. Gates "creates a stronger presence for the UW on the northwest corner of the campus and a more formal entrance along 15th."

== Architecture ==
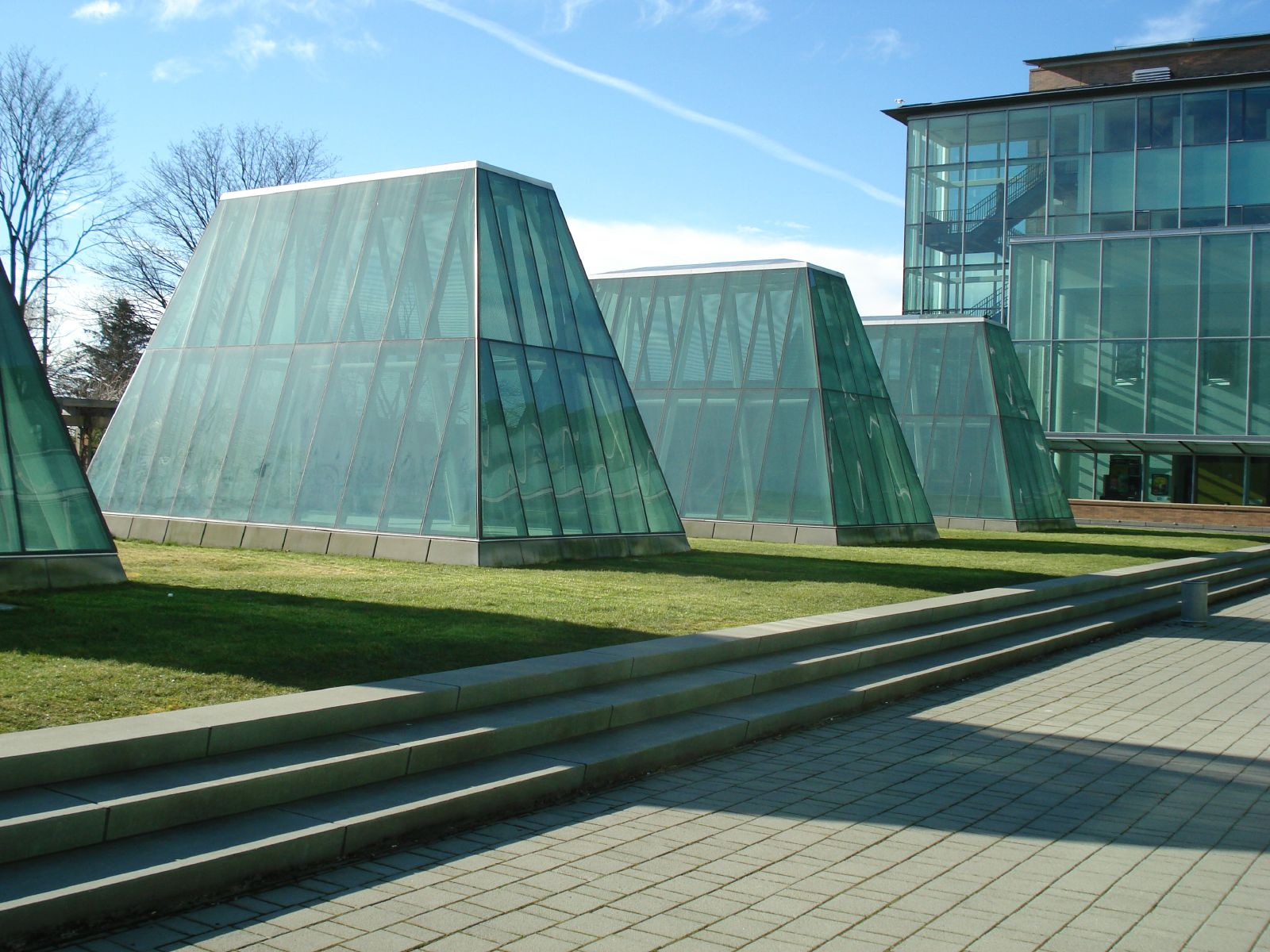
The distinctive skylights in the yard of the hall

The building, which has 196,000 square feet (18,200 m^{2}) of space, is made of brick and glass. The building has around 135,000 bricks and 47,000 square feet (4,400 m^{2}) of glass. The building has four elevator shafts. The main portion of the building is L-shaped, and it borders the library on its north and west sides.

Sheri Olson, an architecture critic of the Seattle Post-Intelligencer, said that "While the taut expanses of brick and metal detailing are modern, the architects use classic elements of composition," such as the building's inverted metal roof, which creates a "crisp cornice line," a "rusticated brick base," a group of triangular, narrow bay windows that are three stories tall, and a midsection that uses a series of windows and alternating projections of brick used to express a pattern and texture. Olson said that the building's series of narrow, three-story-tall, triangular bay windows "are a nod to the verticality of the campus's Collegiate Gothic style established by the early Bebb & Gould buildings." Olson argued that Kohn Pederson Fox "were neither blindly modern nor overly historicist in the design of the building's main facades on the west and north."

The building has white-colored walls that have some birch accents, instead of using the more classic dark wood panels. Olson said that the walls "create a Scandinavian modern sensibility appropriate to our northern climate where early dusk and overcast skies can be depressing for students who spend a lot of time indoors studying." In regards to the choice to not use wood panels, Olson said that the choice "may strike some as not traditional enough but may be one way for the school to distance itself from the entitled, cigar-smoking old-boys club."

== Facilities ==
The building's first two floors have various classrooms. One 170-seat classroom is a mock trial hall. A 28-person computer lab is on the building's second floor, adjacent to the offices of the Washington Journal of Law, Technology & Arts. The building also houses twelve study rooms, a remote learning laboratory, a coffee shop and snack kiosk, a student lounge, faculty offices, student organization offices, private zones for nursing mothers, female and coed toilets, lockers, and shower facilities for people who commute by bicycle. The facility has features for disabled people, including Braille indicators. The student commons is located on the main level, in the crook of the "L".

William H. Gates also houses a "crying room", a facility for parents so that they can bring their children to their classes and still fully participate in them. The parents may watch lectures on video screens provided in the room while their children accompany them in the "crying room." Katherine Long of the Seattle Times said that it is "sort of like a movie theater's crying room." Sarah Renevald, the president of the Graduate and Professional Student Senate (GPSS) at UW, said in 2011 that the UW law school used the "crying room" as a recruitment tool to promote an atmosphere that is favorable towards families, which attracts students and professors to the program.

The school facilities had contemporary technology, including high speed internet access, computerized podiums that had DVD, Microsoft PowerPoint, and internet features. Every classroom has central computers which have projection options. Each classroom seat has electrical outlets and data ports for laptops. The university has a large outdoor When the facility opened, wireless internet was installed inside the facility and at the terrace on top of the library.

The L1 level houses the academic journal suites, such as the Lowery C. Mounger, Jr. Pacific Rim Law & Policy Journal Suite (Room L180-183) and the Preston Gates & Ellis Washington Law Review Suite (Room L180, L184-L188).

Because Ronald Hjorth, the law school's dean emeritus and a professor, and Richard O. Kummert, a professor, donated funds to have the center built, they have classrooms in the building named after them.

=== Marian Gould Gallagher Law Library ===
William H. Gates Hall includes the Marian Gould Gallagher Law Library on the L1 and L2 floors, at a below grade level. It is named after Marian Gould Gallagher, who served as the director of the law library of the University of Washington. As of May 2003 the body of books held by the Gallagher law library, then in a different building, was the largest law library collection north of Berkeley, California and west of Minneapolis, Minnesota.

The Gallagher Law Library has 40,000 square feet (3,700 m^{2}) of library stacks, a 10,000 square feet (930 m^{2}) reading room, staff spaces, and study rooms. The top level of the library is an outdoor terrace that has views of the Seattle skyline. Plant life is incorporated in the terrace's design. Four trapezoidal-shaped, 18-foot (5.5 m)-tall skylights descent from the terrace into the reading room. The skylights center on an opening that connects levels L1 and L2, so the light affects the reading room and the stacks below. The library was designed to be compliant with the Americans with Disabilities Act of 1990. It had room to allow for additions to book collections and student workspaces.

Most of the library collections are open stack. The library's computer terminals are near the entrance, so library patrons may easily access the computers. The library also houses a student-only lounge. The law library has one entrance, allowing for easy security and allowing for the majority of the library to use open book stacks. All library patrons, including faculty and staff, use this entrance.

== Reception to architecture ==
Sherri Olson, an architecture critic of the Seattle Post-Intelligencer, said that the building "has wings that reach out, projecting a spirit of openness and inclusiveness." She commented that "At 196,000-square feet, it's a big building, but the design mitigates its bulk." She concluded "Is it too much to ask a building to inspire a greater sense of social and civic responsibility? Perhaps, but as in the case of Gates Hall, it can at least abet and abate." The namesake of the building, William H. Gates, Sr., had a positive reception to the facility.
