= Washington School of Law =

The Washington School of Law may refers to:

- American University Washington College of Law, in Washington, D.C.
- George Washington University Law School, in Washington, D.C.
- University of Washington School of Law, in Seattle, Washington
- Washington University School of Law, in St. Louis, Missouri
