= William Henry Gates =

William Henry Gates may refer to:

- Bill Gates Sr. (1925–2020), American attorney and father of Bill Gates III
- Bill Gates III (born 1955), American business magnate, co-founder of Microsoft Corporation
