= Kenneth B. Pyle =

American historian of Japan (born 1936)

Kenneth B. Pyle (born April 20, 1936 in Bellefonte, Pennsylvania) is a Japan historian and professor emeritus of History and International Studies at the University of Washington Seattle campus. He earned his BA from Harvard College in 1958. Since earning his PhD in Japanese History from Johns Hopkins University in 1965, he has become a major figure in the area of Japan studies, publishing several books on Japan and its international relations, serving as the first editor of the Journal of Japanese Studies from 1974 to 1986 and director of the Henry M. Jackson School of International Studies at the University of Washington from 1978 to 1988, and appointed by President George H. W. Bush to chair the Japan-U.S. Friendship Commission from 1992 to 1995. In 1998, the Japanese government awarded Pyle with the Order of the Rising Sun, and in 2008 he received the Japan Foundation Award for Japanese Studies.

Pyle is Founding President of The National Bureau of Asian Research (NBR), a nonpartisan, nonprofit think tank, and serves on the organization's Board of Directors. In 2006, NBR created The Kenneth B. and Anne H.H. Pyle Center For Northeast Asian Studies, a research center focused on Northeast Asian political and security issues.

== Selected works ==
=== Books ===
- Japan in the American Century (Belknap Press, 2018)
- International Order and the Rise of Asia: History and Theory, in Strategic Asia 2011-12: Asia Responds to Its Rising Powers - China and India, Ashley J. Tellis, Travis Tanner, and Jessica Keough editors (National Bureau of Asian Research, 2011)
- Japan Rising: The Resurgence of Japanese Power and Purpose (Public Affairs Books, 2007)
- The Making of Modern Japan (D.C. Heath, second edition 1996)
- The Japanese Question: Power and Purpose in a New Era (AEI Press, second edition 1996), Japanese edition (1995), Chinese edition (1997)
- The New Generation in Meiji Japan: Problems of Cultural Identity (Stanford University Press, 1969)

=== Journals ===
- Kenneth B. Pyle and Eric Heginbotham, Japan, Strategic Asia 2001-02: Power and Purpose (NBR, September 2001)
- Michael H. Armacost and Kenneth B. Pyle, Japan and the Engagement of China: Challenges for U.S. Policy Coordination, NBR Analysis (December 2001)
- Kenneth B. Pyle, Abe Shinzo and Japan's Change of Course, NBR Analysis (October 2006)
- Kenneth B. Pyle, Reading the New Era in Asia: The Use of History and Culture in the Making of Foreign Policy, Asia Policy (January 2007)
- Kenneth B. Pyle et al., Emerging Leaders in East Asia: The Next Generation of Political Leadership in China, Japan, South Korea, and Taiwan, (NBR, September 2008)
- Kenneth B. Pyle et al., A New Stage for the U.S.-Japan Alliance? (Asia Policy, July 2010]

== Honors and awards ==
- Order of the Rising Sun
- Japan Foundation Award
