= Thomas B. Fargo =

US Navy admiral

Thomas Boulton Fargo AO
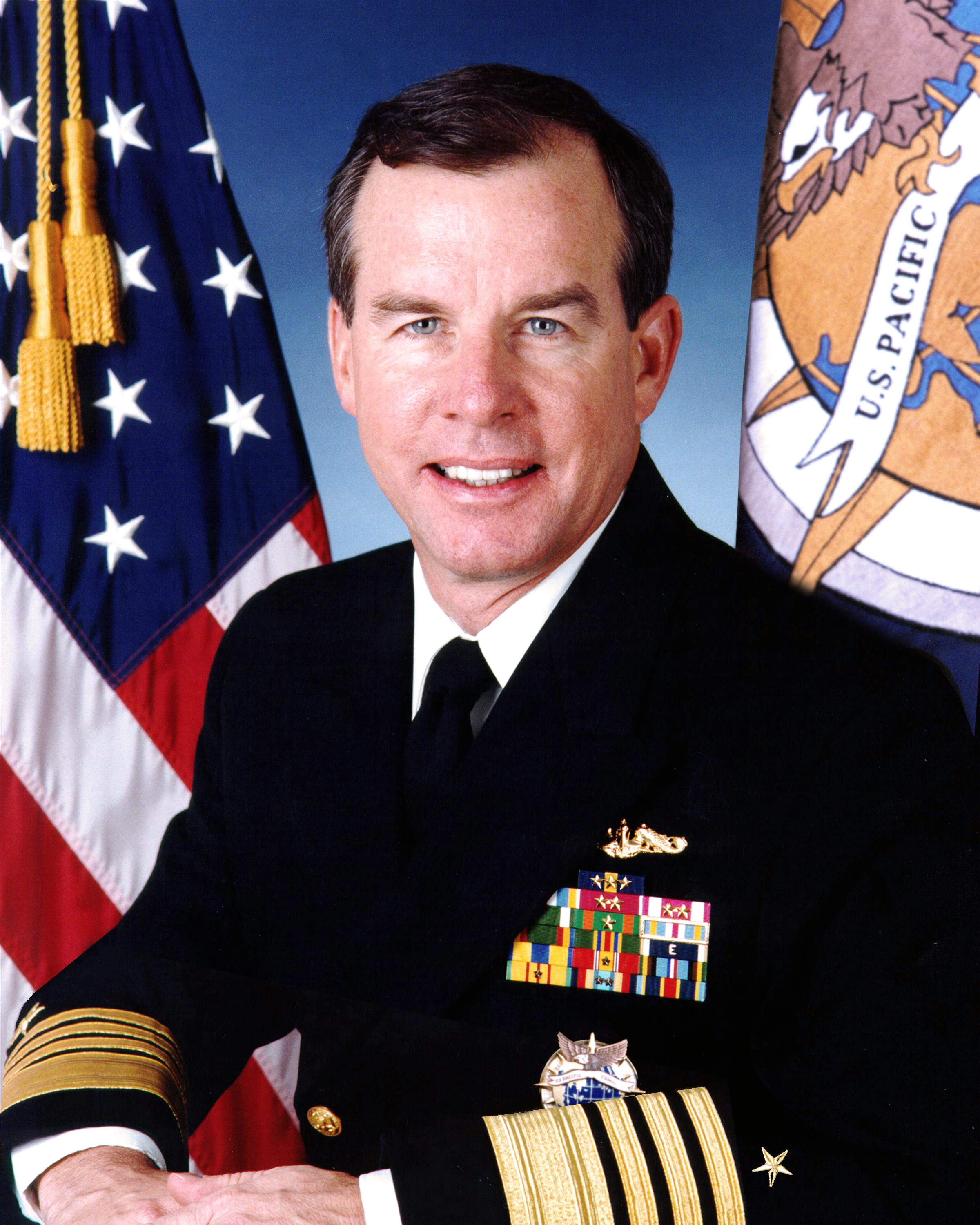
- Admiral Thomas B. Fargo, USN
- Born: June 13, 1948 (age 78); San Diego, California, U.S.
- Military career
- Allegiance: United States
- Branch: United States Navy
- Service years: 1970–2005
- Rank: Admiral
- Commands: United States Pacific Command; USS Salt Lake City
- Awards: Distinguished Service Medal (4); Defense Superior Service Medal; Legion of Merit (3); Officer of the Order of Australia (Australia) (honorary)

Thomas Boulton Fargo AO (born June 13, 1948) is a retired Admiral in the United States Navy. He served as Commander, United States Pacific Command, at Camp H. M. Smith, Hawaii from May 2, 2002 to February 26, 2005. He was the twentieth officer to hold the position.

== Biography ==
Born in San Diego, California, in June 1948, Fargo attended high school in Coronado, California, and Sasebo, Japan, and graduated from the United States Naval Academy in June 1970.

His father, Thomas A. Boulton, was a naval officer who was killed in a plane crash in 1957. His mother, Helen, remarried in 1960 to Captain William Fargo, US Navy. Helen was a Lieutenant in the US Navy Nurse Corps during World War II; both Thomas and William graduated from the Naval Academy (Class of 1943 and Class of 1939, respectively.)

Trained in joint, naval and submarine commands, Fargo served in a variety of sea and shore duty assignments. At sea, his five assignments in both attack and ballistic missile submarines included Executive Officer aboard Plunger and Commanding Officer of Salt Lake City. While commander of the Salt Lake City, Fargo hosted aboard several members of the cast of the movie The Hunt for Red October as they were researching their roles as submarine crew members. He served as Commander, Submarine Group SEVEN, Commander Task Force SEVEN FOUR, and Commander Task Force ONE FIVE SEVEN in the Western Pacific, Indian Ocean and Persian Gulf from 1992 to 1993. He commanded the United States FIFTH Fleet and Naval Forces of the Central Command during two years of Iraqi contingency operations from July 1996 to July 1998. Fargo served as the 29th Commander in Chief, U.S. Pacific Fleet from October 1999 to May 2002.

Ashore, Fargo served in the Bureau of Naval Personnel and with the Commander in Chief, U.S. Atlantic Fleet and has had multiple assignments in the Office of the Chief of Naval Operations. After his selection to Flag rank in 1994, Admiral Fargo has served as Director of Operations (J-3), U.S. Atlantic Command during the Haiti intervention; as Director, Assessment Division (N-81) for the Chief of Naval Operations; and the Deputy Chief of Naval Operations for Plans, Policy and Operations (N3/N5).

While serving as Commander of the U.S. Pacific Command (PACOM), Fargo informed the United States Congress of his plans to retire from the Navy. Although an Air Force flag officer was nominated to succeed him, the Senate declined to confirm the nominee, as it was customary to fill that post with a Navy flag officer. President Bush accordingly extended Fargo's mandatory retirement date. Fargo ultimately retired from military service in 2005, when the Senate confirmed Admiral William J. Fallon to succeed him as Commander of USPACOM.

Admiral Fargo is a 1989 recipient of the Vice Admiral James Bond Stockdale Award for Inspirational Leadership. His personal decorations include the Distinguished Service Medal (four awards), the Defense Superior Service Medal, and the Legion of Merit (three awards). In February 2005 he was appointed an honorary Officer of the Order of Australia "for distinguished naval service, particularly for strengthening the Australia-United States alliance whilst Commander United States Pacific Command".

In 2010, the National Bureau of Asian Research appointed Fargo as the second holder of the Shalikashvili Chair in National Security Studies.

In 2019, Fargo became the 22nd chairman of USAA.

== Awards and decorations ==
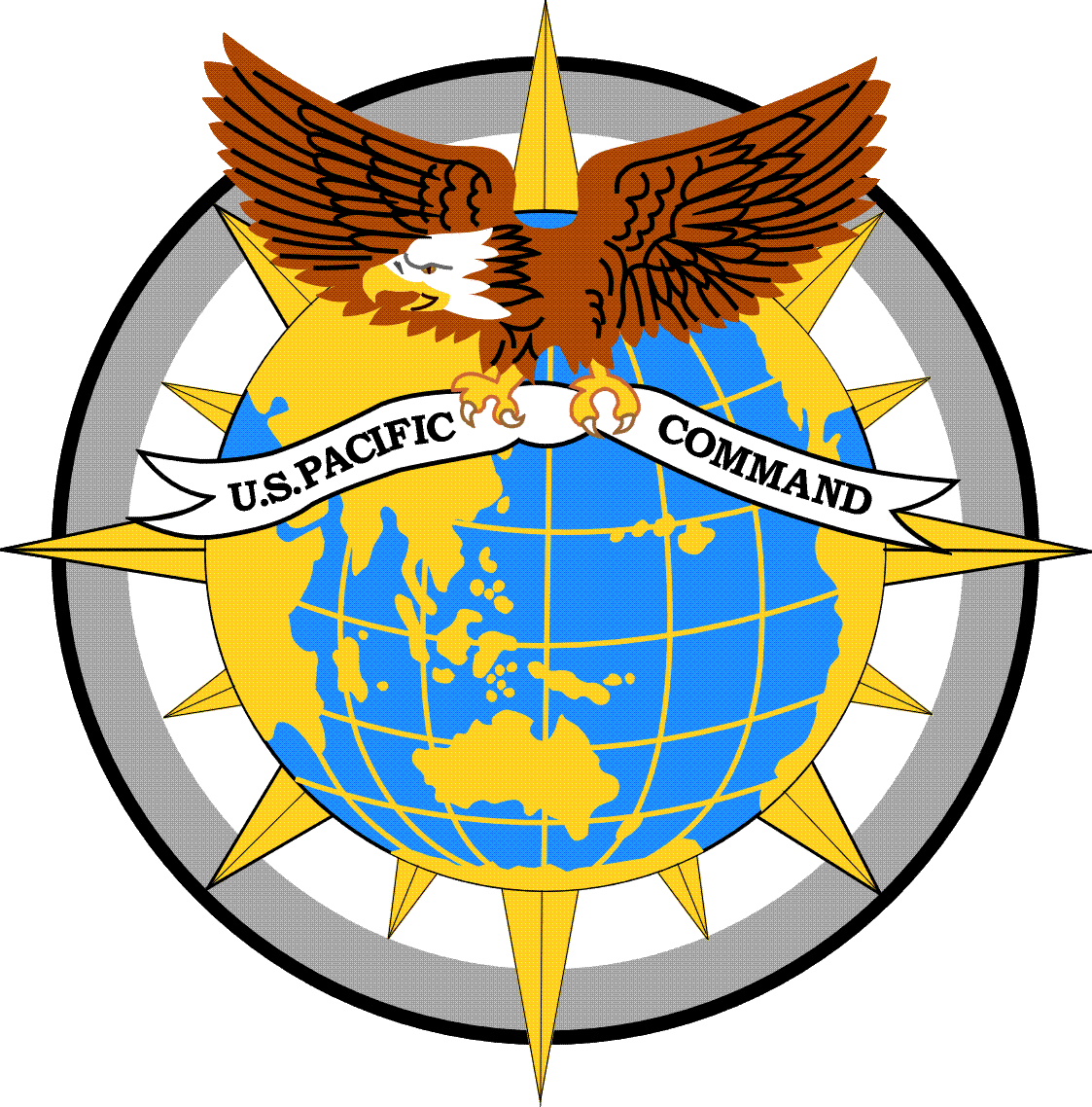
United States Pacific Command Badge

Navy Distinguished Service Medal with 3 gold award stars
Defense Superior Service Medal
Legion of Merit with 2 award stars
Meritorious Service Medal with 2 award stars
Navy Commendation Medal
Navy Achievement Medal with award star
Joint Meritorious Unit Award
Navy Unit Commendation
Navy Meritorious Unit Commendation
Navy "E" Ribbon
Navy Expeditionary Medal
National Defense Service Medal with 2 bronze service stars
Armed Forces Expeditionary Medal
Vietnam Service Medal with service star
Navy Sea Service Deployment Ribbon with two service stars
Navy & Marine Corps Overseas Service Ribbon
Honorary Officer of the Order of Australia (Military Division)

== The Hunt for Red October ==
Admiral Fargo served as the inspiration for the character of Commander Bart Mancuso in the film The Hunt for Red October. Scott Glenn spent several days preparing for his role aboard the Salt Lake City. It was during this time that he decided to base his portrayal of his character on then-Commander Fargo.

Fargo had told Glenn, "I've given orders to all the men on board to treat you as equal rank with me so every time for the next few days while we are out, when someone comes up and reports to me, they are going to turn around and report to you, and I'm going to tell you what we are going to do about it. There may be once or twice that I'm going to ask you to go to your quarters when we are dealing with stuff that is top secret."

"Tom Fargo was a strong, tough commander, but he had a degree of relaxation and looseness that I never would have expected." – Scott Glenn.

"He was incredibly confident...he was this guy you would follow into hell." – Alec Baldwin.

== Notes ==
Military offices
Preceded by Dennis C. Blair	Commander, United States Pacific Command; 2002–2005	Succeeded by William J. Fallon
