= David Bachman =

American international relations scholar and professor

David M. Bachman
- Education: BA: Swarthmore College; MA: Stanford University; PhD: Stanford University

David M. Bachman is a professor of international studies at the University of Washington, United States. He has also served as the chair of the China Studies Program of the university's Henry M. Jackson School of International Studies from 1992 to 2003, and was an associate director of the school from 2000 to 2001 and 2003–2010. His scholarship has principally focused on modern China, US-China relations, international relations, Asian politics, and the international political economy.

== Education ==
Bachman graduated with a bachelor's degree in history from Swarthmore College in 1975. He then earned both an MA degree and a PhD in political science from Stanford University, in 1977 and 1984, respectively.

== Career ==
Bachman taught at both and Stanford University and Princeton University before coming to teach at the University of Washington in 1991. Additionally, he has been the president of the Washington State China Relations Council in 2005, serving on its executive committee for a total of 10 years.

As a writer, he has published two books and at least 50 articles on Chinese politics and foreign policy.

== Selected publications ==
=== Articles ===
- Bachman, D. (2010). The Limited Power of the Internet in China. Asia Policy 10, 179–182. https://dx.doi.org/10.1353/asp.2010.0050.

=== Books ===
- Bachman, D. (1991). Bureaucracy, Economy, and Leadership in China - The Institutional Origins of the Great Leap Forward. Cambridge University Press. ISBN 978-0-52-140275-0.
- Bachman, D. (1985). Chen Yun and the Chinese Political System. Institute of East Asian Studies. ISBN 978-0-91-296680-9.
