= Condon Hall (University of Washington) =

University of Washington building

Coordinates: 47°39′24″N 122°18′58″W

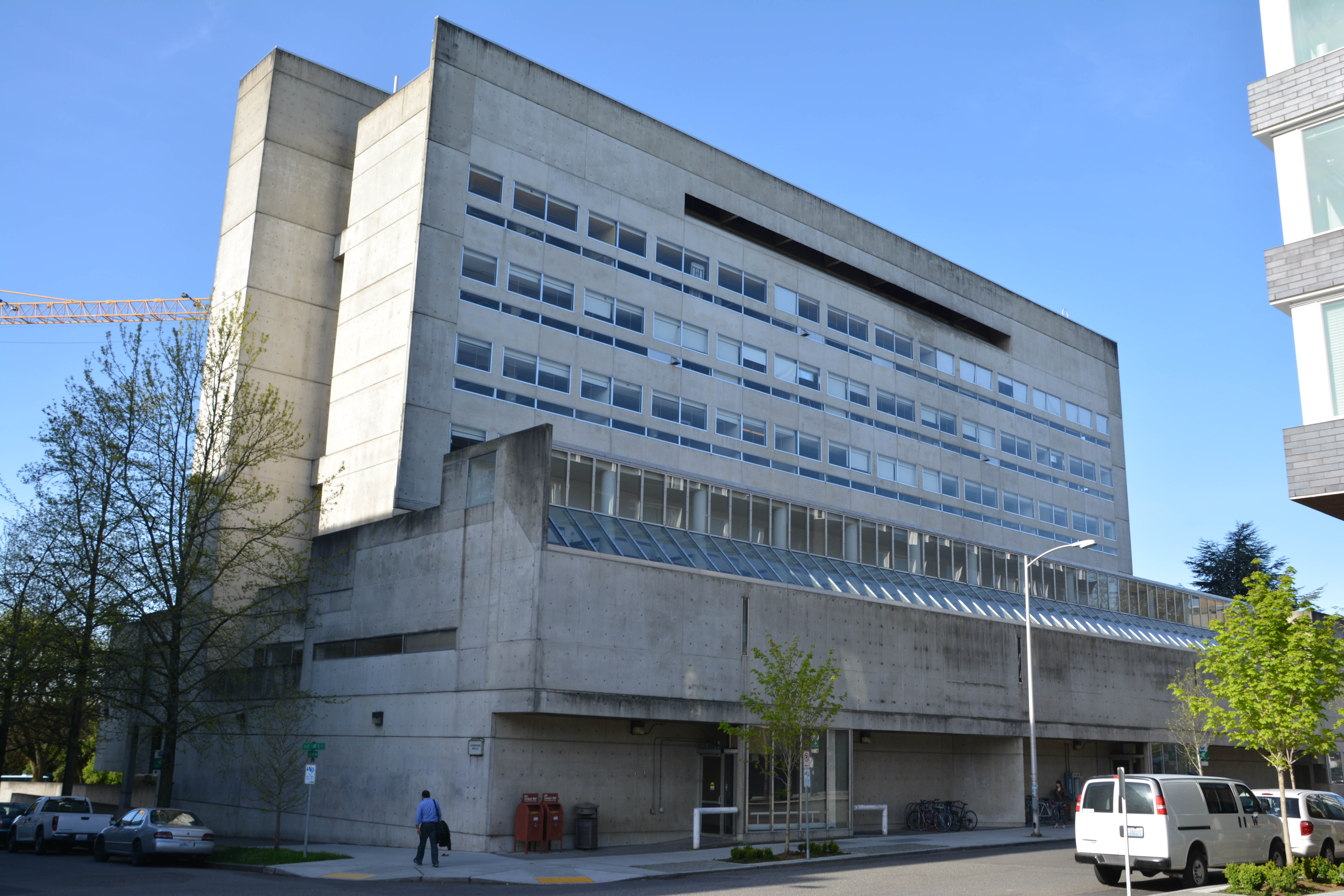
Condon Hall

John T. Condon Hall is an academic building of the University of Washington in Seattle, Washington. The building formerly housed the UW School of Law. The hall was named after John T. Condon, the first dean of the School of Law.

== History ==
In 1973 the Philadelphia architectural firm Mitchell/Giurgola was selected to design the building with Joyce / Copeland / Vaughan / Nordfors Architects serving as associate architects. In 1975, the University of Washington School of Law moved from the former Condon Hall, which was renamed Gowen Hall. At the time, the new facility afforded much more space to the School.

The university planned for Condon to house classrooms, a moot court, seminar spaces, and a main reading room. The project's first phase had 129,000 square feet (12,000 m^{2}) of space. The budget for general construction was $3,814,900. The budget for furnishings was $250,000. The first phase included a law library and classroom space for 500 students. The university planned to construct a second phase, which would have increased the size of the building to 207,000 square feet (19,200 m^{2}). The second phase was supposed to have space for 50 post-graduate students and an addition to the law library that would double its size.

In 1982 an economic recession occurred, forcing the university to cancel its plans. The law school gradually increased in size, and Condon became too small for the law school. Various departments of the law school were forced to occupy other buildings.

The Washington State Legislature, on two occasions, failed to provide the funds to expand the building. At a later point the university decided that it could build a new administrative services building and then store extra administrative services that were previously spread across the university campus at Condon Hall. The university would use the cost savings to allow it to build a new law school. For a period of over one decade, officials from the law school advocated for a replacement for the Condon building.

In 2003 the UW School of Law moved out of Condon into William H. Gates Hall. The university planned to use Condon as "surge space" after the law school moved out. That means that departments or offices would be temporarily located at Condon while their permanent facilities underwent renovation. Colleen Pike, the UW principal higher education facilities planner, said that the UW campus had no other "surge space" facilities.

Beginning in 2006, on a temporary basis, Condon began to house the UW College of Built Environments Department of Architecture, the Department of Applied Mathematics, and the UW College of Engineering Department of Aeronautics & Astronautics. From around 2007 to around 2009, the university used it as surge space and, while Savery Hall was refurbished, several humanities departments were housed at Condon.

== Location ==
Condon Hall is located on Campus Parkway, four blocks away from the UW main campus. "The lack of integration between it [the building] and the rest of campus impeded collaboration efforts" was noted as one of the reasons for moving out by Penny Hazelton, a professor and an associate dean for library and computing services of the current UW School of Law Gallagher Law Library, and Jonathan Franklin, the associate law librarian."

== Architecture ==
Condon Hall, a poured-in-place concrete and glass building, has 132,000 square feet (12,300 m^{2}) of space. It was built in the Brutalist architectural style, for which the architectural firm Mitchell/Giurgola was known. Along with the newly built dormitory buildings nearby, the building stood out in the surrounding lower rise neighborhood.

Early on, the building received several awards. However, controversies emerged in the local press some years later. Marsha King of the Seattle Times said in 1996 that Condon was "an ugly, badly designed, 20-year-old structure. With its narrow halls, windowless classrooms and sparse public spaces, the exposed concrete building is only slightly more appealing than the county jail." Eric Feigenbaum of The Daily of the University of Washington wrote "The only thing everyone, inside and outside the University, agrees on is that Condon Hall was a poor law school building from the moment it opened." Several law school deans complained about the building's design. In 1996 William P. Gerberding, the University of Washington President Emeritus, recalled that when he arrived to UW in 1979, he heard many complaints about Condon. In 1996 Ronald Hjorth, the Dean Emeritus of the University of Washington School of Law, said that Condon was "a miserable structure" and that "[t]he future of this law school is not bright, if we stay in this building."

The building design became the subject of renewed criticism when the local press started debating the need for a new building for the Law School. In 2003, Dean Hjorth called "...[Condon Hall] an example of early Stalinist architecture...[which] did not uplift the spirits." Ray Rivera of the Seattle Times referred to it as a "joyless" structure. For Sheri Olson of the Seattle Post-Intelligencer, the building was "despised from the start" due to its architectural style. Olson said that the "bunkerlike" building "resembled the last bastion of an embattled male-dominated profession holed up behind narrow slots in the concrete sunscreens."

In the meantime, university officials found the building to be too small, and its concrete floors and walls made modernizing the technical infrastructure difficult. By 2003 the University encountered difficulty in upgrading the building for computer-based instruction.

In contrast, architects and their critics found many positive attributes to the building design. There was clarity in locating ancillary offices and lower level lounges in the south end of the structure while the library was placed in the north end. Concentrating utilitarian functions along a central wall that protrudes at both ends of the building, housing elevators, stairs, and toilets, was also appreciated. Architectural Record stated that this layout would guide a person navigating in the building and would facilitate adding to the building in the future when its second stage would be built. The article also noted that this building, and the Tredyffrin Library in Strafford, Tredyffrin Township, Pennsylvania; which was also designed by Mitchell/Giurgola, shared common underlying concepts, including, "unusual sensitivity in using natural light to best advantage while warding off the sun ... [a] quickly apparent organization of functions ... [and being] responsive to the varying situations in which it is built."

In 2019, UW News's Peter Kelley wrote "Beauty in Brutalism? Architecture professor Alex Anderson reviews the UW's 'bunkerlike' behemoths" following the publication of an essay by Anderson in Harvard Design News. Alex Anderson, who also is Director of the MS Program in Architecture History and Theory, is quoted by Kelley as recalling that during the Department of Architecture's temporary stay in Condon Hall "Most of us [meaning faculty, staff and students] liked the building for a bunch of reasons. First, the concrete work is very precise—smooth with straight edges and carefully arranged tie holes. It is clear what parts of the building are structural and nonstructural. The building also does a great job of orienting the spaces inside. Offices have great views, but the concrete sun shades protect them from excess glare. The large spaces on the north side, which we used for studios, have great light." Today, Condon Hall stands as one of the few pedigreed specimens of Brutalist architecture on the U.S. West Coast.

=== Awards ===
Upon completion, the building won several architectural awards including the 1976 American Institute of Architects Philadelphia Chapter Citation of Excellence and the 1977 Pennsylvania Society of Architects (now the AIA Pennsylvania) Distinguished Building Award.

== Facility ==
In 1999, overcrowded conditions occurred at Condon. Students who were late to class were required to stand in hallways. Because of the lack of space, the law school did not house the alumni relations office and the continuing legal education program in Condon. Instead the university rented houses across the street from Condon and housed the programs there. The six law clinics were located outside of Condon Hall. From 1974 to 1998, the law school was unable to expand its enrollment and its curricula. In 2001 the classrooms did not have computers, nor did they have sufficient electrical outlets. The building had limited access for people who had disabilities.

On two occasions the American Bar Association said that Condon was not suitable for what Ray Rivera of the Seattle Times referred to as "today's cyber-dependent study of law."

=== Library ===
Condon Hall previously housed the Marian Gould Gallagher Law Library. It was named after Marian Gould Gallagher, who served as the law library director of the University of Washington. The plan for Phase I stated that the law library was to include 40,977 square feet (3,806.9 m^{2}) of space. Under Phase II, the law library was supposed to have its space doubled, but Phase II never happened. Pegeen Mulhern, author of "Marian Gould Gallagher's Imprint on Law Librarianship—The Advantage of Casting Bread upon the Waters," said that the library reading rooms were comfortable. Mulhern added that "By and large Gallagher's domain, the new law library, was a great success."

In 2001 the former law library occupied space on seven different floors, including the basement. The law library facility had 22 entrances and exits. This provided an unsecure environment for its library volumes. Around 1996 the law school lost $400,000 annually in stolen books. The 22-inch (560 mm) book aisles were not compliant with the Americans with Disabilities Act. The issues with the library were used as jokes in a roast for Gallagher held by the faculty at her retirement party.

In 2003, while the books were moved out of Condon to go to William H. Gates Hall, the librarians could not fit their library carts into the aisles. The staff used a ferrying system to get books to range ends. The staff used a cart numbering system, removed books from shelves, and placed them in the carts.

== Departments and agencies ==
In addition to several classrooms and lecture halls, the building is currently home to Startup Hall, which is a university-sponsored space for local entrepreneurs and startups to work in as part of the university's CoMotion collaborative innovation program.

In 2012, the University of Washington Ethnic Cultural Center (ECC) had a temporary location on Condon's seventh floor. The ECC moved into a new permanent facility on Brooklyn Ave in 2013 called the Samuel E. Kelly Ethnic Cultural Center.

From 2010 to 2012, when the university's student union building (The HUB) was being renovated, Condon Hall served as the location for The HUB @ Condon, which was a temporary facility that replaced the services of the permanent HUB facility during the renovation. The permanent HUB facility reopened in the northern hemisphere fall of 2012. During the renovation, the Associated Students of the University of Washington (ASUW), a nonprofit organization, had its main offices in Rooms 413/429 of Condon Hall.

When the University of Washington School of Law occupied Condon Hall, the Pacific Rim Law & Policy Journal had its offices in the building.

== Gallery ==
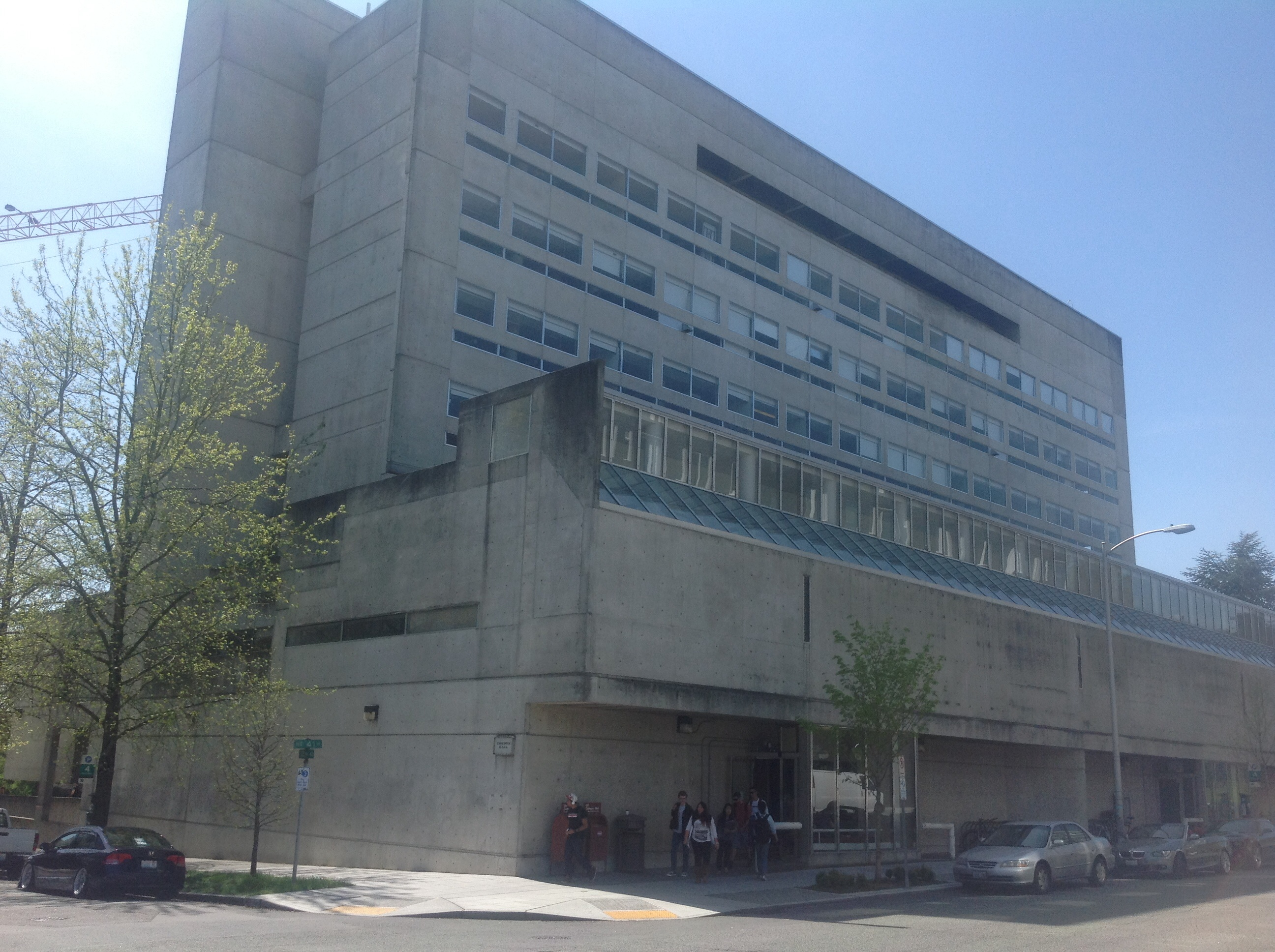
Condon Hall 1

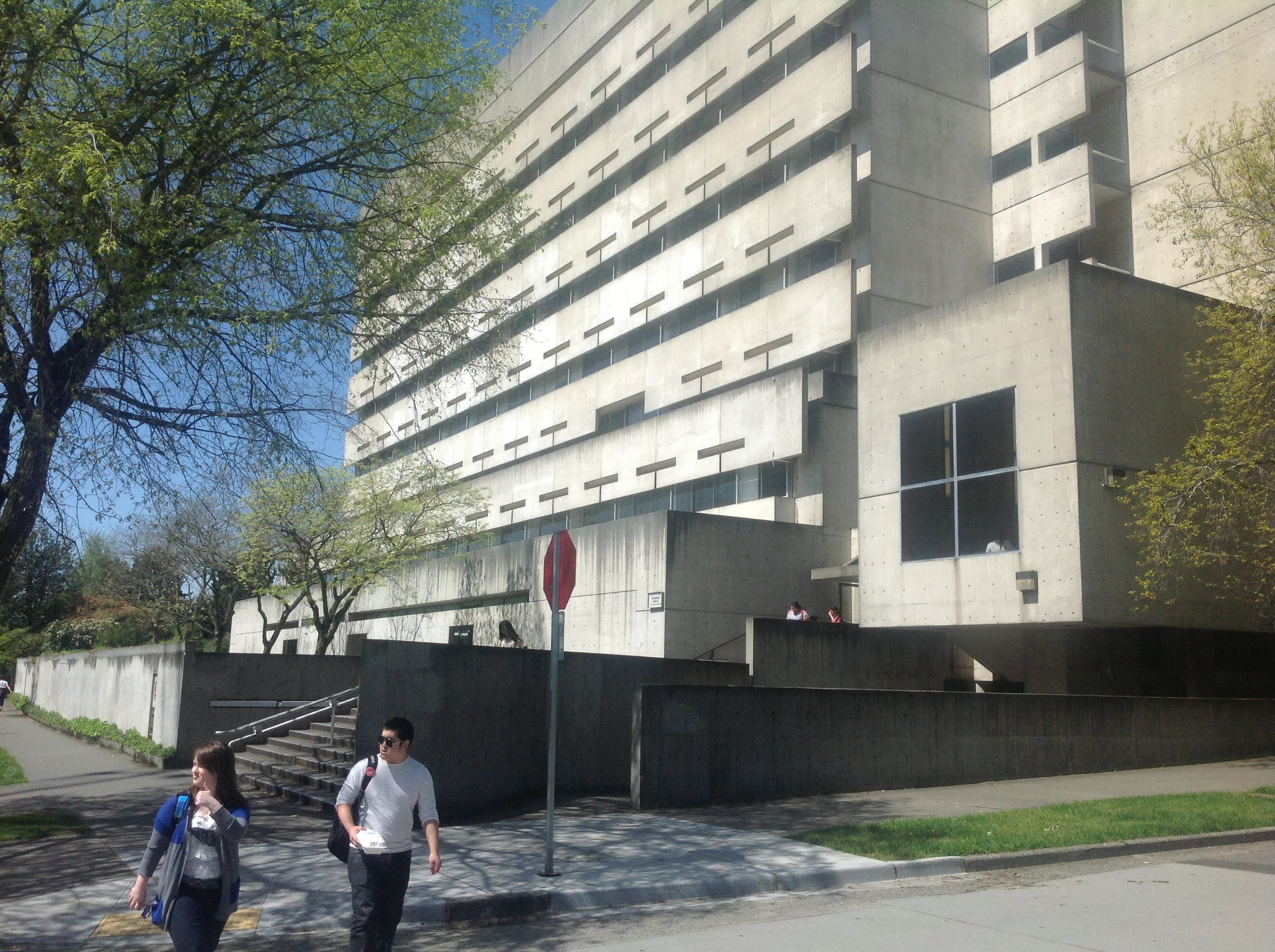
Condon Hall 2

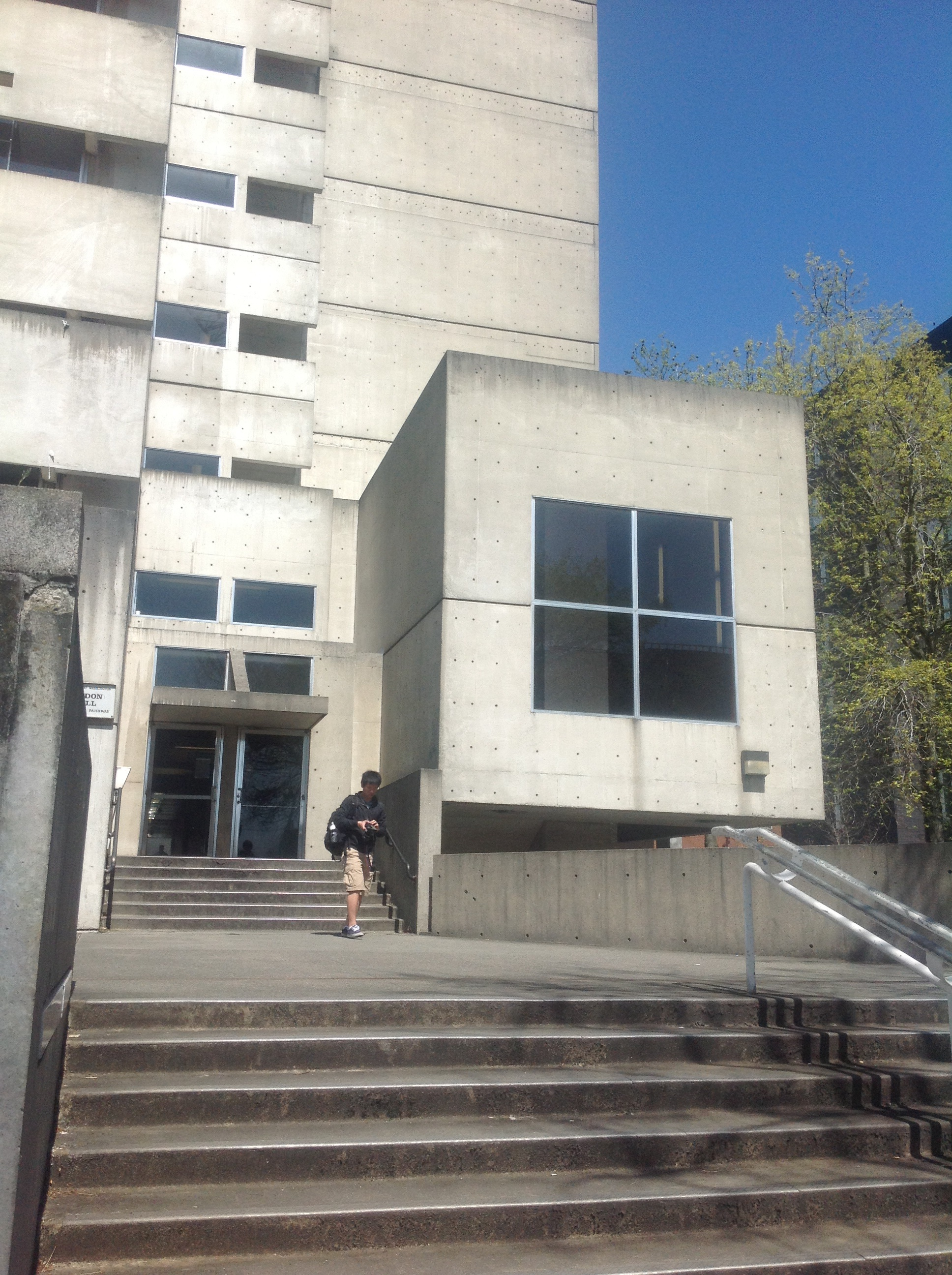
Condon Hall 3

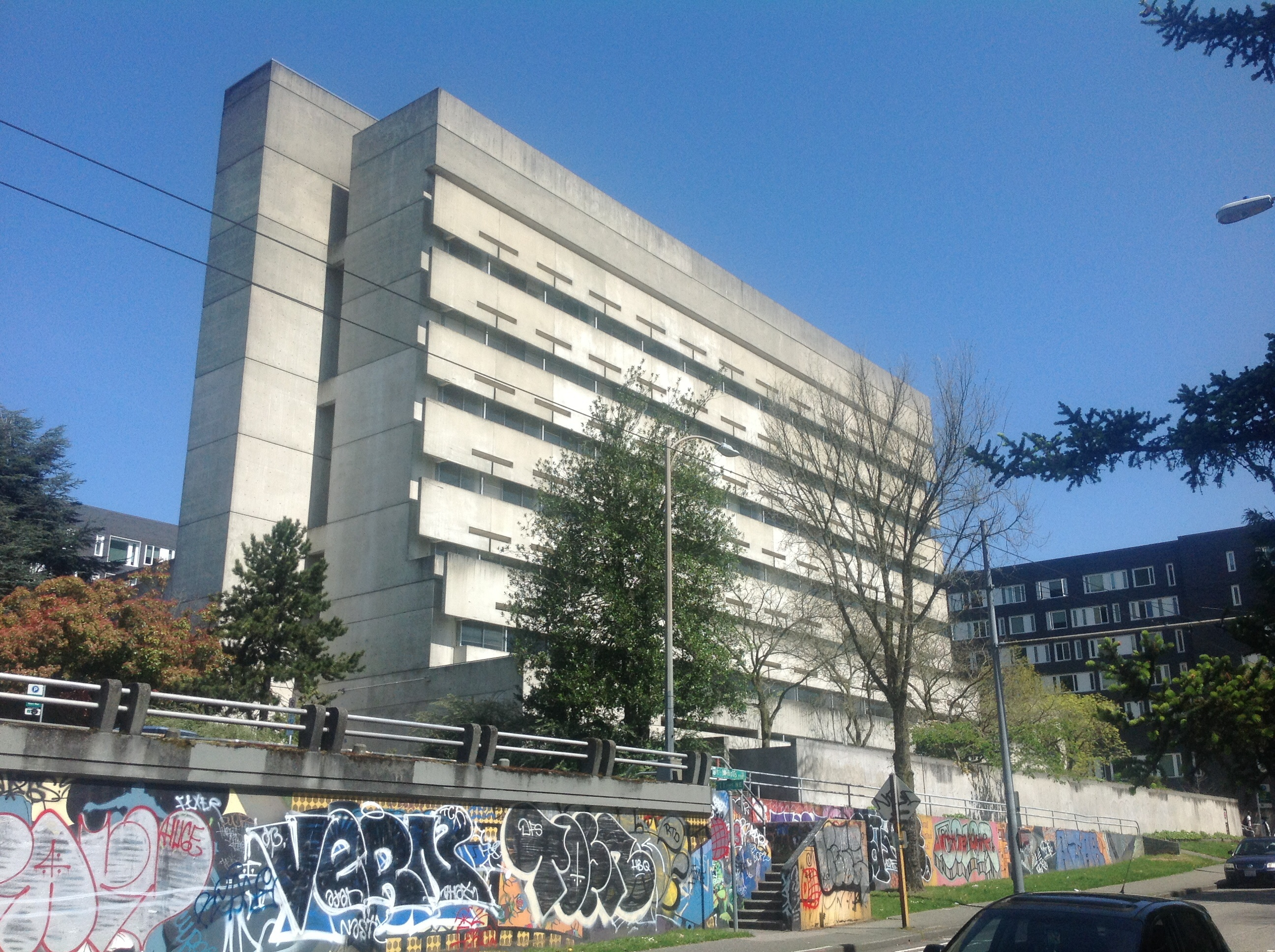
Condon Hall 4
