= T. J. Pempel =

American academic

T. J. Pempel (Ph.D., Columbia) is Jack M. Forcey Professor of Political Science (emeritus) at the University of California, Berkeley. He joined the UC Berkeley faculty in July 2001 and was also the director of the Institute of East Asian Studies from January 2002 until 2007. He held the Il Han New Chair in Asian Studies from 2001 to 2007. He retired in 2022.

== Early life and education ==
Pempel was born on December 15, 1942, in Valley Stream, New York. He attended Catholic grammar school and high school, graduating magna cum laude in 1960 from Saint Agnes Cathedral High School in Rockville Centre, New York. He enlisted immediately in the U.S. Marine Corps where he served for four years. Upon his honorable discharge in 1964 as a corporal he entered Columbia University graduating cum laude with honors in Government in 1966.

He continued at Columbia and received his M.A. in 1968 and his Ph.D. in Political Science and East Asian Studies in 1972. During this time he was active in the anti-Vietnam War movement as a member of Vets for Peace and a founder of Vietnam Veterans Against the War. He also ran a district office for Eugene McCarthy's Presidential campaign in 1968.

== Career ==
From 1972 to 1991, he was on the faculty at Cornell University; he was also Director of Cornell's East Asia Program. Additionally, he has been a faculty member at the University of Colorado and the University of Wisconsin–Madison where he was Glen B. and Cleone Orr Hawkins Professor of Political Science. Just prior to going to Berkeley, he held the Boeing Professorship of International Studies in the Jackson School of International Studies and was an adjunct professor in Political Science at the University of Washington in Seattle. Pempel has also been a visiting professor at Yonsei University in Seoul, Korea and the National Graduate Institute for Policy Studies in Tokyo.

Professor Pempel's research and teaching focus on comparative politics, political economy, contemporary Japan, economic-security tensions, and Asian regionalism. His recent books include "A Region of Regimes: Prosperity and Plunder in the Asia-Pacific" (Cornell University Press); "Two Crises: Different Outomes: East Asia and Global Finance," (Cornell University Press); "Crisis as Catalyst: The Dynamics of the East Asian Region," (Cornell University Press, edited with Andrew MacIntyre and John Ravenhill, Remapping East Asia: The Construction of a Region (Cornell University Press), Beyond Bilateralism: U.S.-Japan Relations in the New Asia-Pacific (Stanford University Press), as well as The Politics of the Asian Economic Crisis, Regime Shift: Comparative Dynamics of the Japanese Political Economy, and Uncommon Democracies: The One-Party Dominant Regimes (all from Cornell University Press), and The Japanese Civil Service and Economic Development: Catalysts of Development, a jointly edited book sponsored by the World Bank (Oxford University Press). Earlier books include Policymaking in Contemporary Japan (Cornell University Press), Trading Technology: Europe and Japan in the Middle East (Praeger), and Policy and Politics in Japan: Creative Conservatism (Temple University Press). In addition, he has published over one hundred twenty articles and chapters in books.

Professor Pempel has held research grants from, among others, the Fulbright Commission, the U.S.-Japan Friendship Commission, the Department of Education, the National Science Foundation, the Taiwanese Ministry of Education, the Luce Foundation, the National Endowment for the Humanities, the Social Science Research Foundation and the MacArthur Foundation. From 1996-2006 he served on the American Advisory Council to the Japan Foundation and was Chair from 2000-2006. From 2004-2006 he was Chair of the Working Group on Northeast Asian Security of CSCAP. He is also active with the Northeast Asian Cooperation Dialogue (NEACD), is on editorial boards of twelve professional journals, and he has served on various committees of the American Political Science Association, the Association for Asian Studies, and the Social Science Research Council. Starting in 2012 he became a presidentially-appointed member of the Japan US Friendship Commission. In 2016 he was awarded the Japanese Minister of Foreign Affairs Commendation and in 2022, he received the Order of the Rising Sun with Gold Rays and a Neck Ribbon from the Japanese government. He is currently doing research on various problems associated with Japanese, Korean and Taiwanese political and economic adjustments to the end of bipolarity and the rise in global capital flows.

== Personal life ==
Since 1976, Pempel has been a long distance runner, competing in over 350 road and track races, and completing thirty marathons, including seven Boston Marathons (P.R.: 2:36 in 1981). He is also an accomplished scuba diver with over 400 logged dives including many in Asia, Australia, the Caribbean, Mexico, Fiji and the Maldives.

Pempel is married to Kaela Kory and has two sons, Aaron K. Pempel and Sean McDowell.
