= Mimi Gardner Gates =

American art historian (born 1943)

Mimi Gates
- Born: Mary Gardner; July 30, 1943 (age 83)
- Education: Stanford University (BA); Institut national des langues et civilisations orientales; University of Iowa (MA); Yale University (PhD)
- Occupation: Art historian
- Spouse: Bill Gates Sr. (m. 1996; died 2020)

Mary "Mimi" Gates (née Gardner; born July 30, 1943) is an American art historian who was director of the Seattle Art Museum from 1994 to 2009. She is most well-known as the second wife of Bill Gates Sr., the father of Bill Gates.

== Early life ==
Gates obtained a B.A. degree in art history from Stanford University, a certificate with honors in Chinese language and culture from the École Nationale des Langues Orientales Vivantes in Paris, an M.A. degree in Oriental and Chinese Studies from the University of Iowa, and a Ph.D. degree in Art History from Yale University.

== Career ==
An old friend of Teresa Heinz Kerry, she is also a frequent juror for the Heinz Awards, appointed by the Heinz Family Philanthropies to award outstanding achievement in the area of Arts and Humanities.

She was curator of Asian art and then director of the Yale University Art Gallery. At Yale, she contributed to the development of the Association of Art Museum Directors (AAMD) guideline discouraging the sale of artwork in a Museum's collection, even to cover operating costs. In a brief, she detailed her view that museum collections are "a public trust". She has also lobbied the U.S. and Chinese negotiators to ensure that implementation of UNESCO rules about non-archaeological cultural exports do not tie the hands of American curators.

She came to Seattle in 1994 to head the museum, and during her tenure, added over 2500 works to the collections. Among these are many Asian art treasures and works by Van Dyck, Albert Bierstadt, Richard Serra and Alexander Calder. The museum has also established the Olympic Sculpture Park, which displaced the maintenance barn for the Waterfront Streetcar and caused its permanent shutdown. By 2005, the museum's endowment had tripled to over $75 million and the region's first conservation studio was opened. In 1999, the museum discovered that a Matisse painting in its possession was looted by Nazis and owned by the descendants of French-Jewish art dealer Paul Rosenberg. Gates brokered an 11th-hour settlement that returned the artwork, after which the museum sued the gallery that had sold it the painting in the 1950s. Gates has co-authored Porcelain Stories: From China to Europe and Biblical Art and the Asian Imagination

Gates retired from the Seattle Art Museum in 2009.

Gates, elected by Yale alumni, served a six-year term, commencing July 1, 2007, on the Yale Corporation, Yale University’s governing body.

== Personal life ==
In 1996, Mimi married Bill Gates Sr., father of Microsoft co-founder Bill Gates. Bill Sr. died in 2020.

== Honours ==
- Order of the Rising Sun, 3rd Class, Gold Rays with Neck Ribbon (2026)
