= University of Washington School of Law =

Law school in Seattle, Washington, US

Coordinates: 47°39′34″N 122°18′39″W

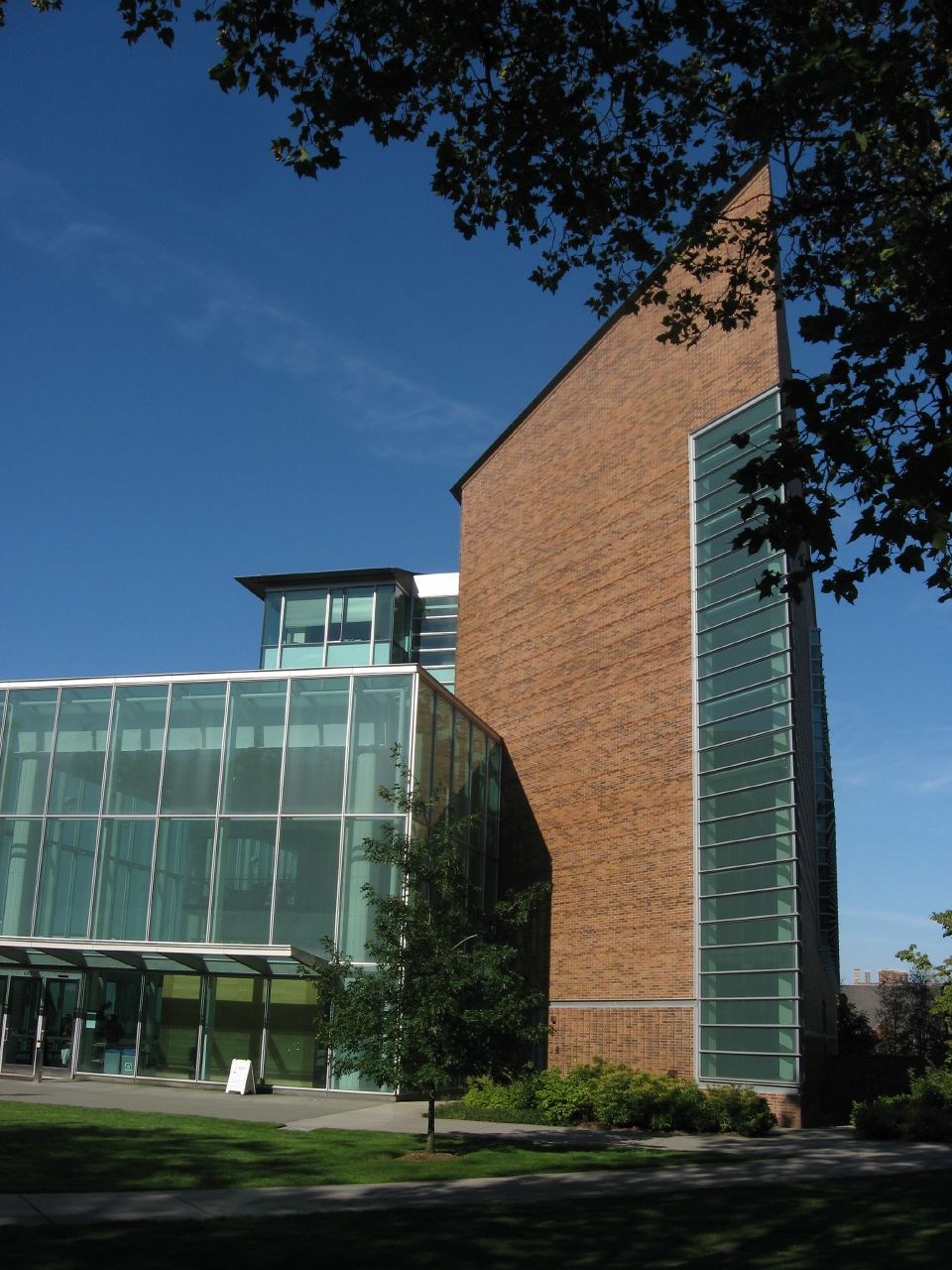
- William H. Gates Hall
- Parent school: University of Washington
- Established: 1899
- School type: Public
- Parent endowment: $2.968 billion (2016)
- Dean: Tamara F. Lawson
- Location: Seattle, Washington, U.S.
- Enrollment: 522 (2022)
- Faculty: 161 (2022)
- USNWR ranking: 50th (2025)
- Website: law.uw.edu
- ABA profile: Standard 509 Report

The University of Washington School of Law is the law school of the University of Washington, located on the northwest corner of the main campus in Seattle, Washington. The school is fully accredited by the American Bar Association and has been a member of the Association of American Law Schools since 1909.

== History ==
The school was first organized in 1899. The current law building, the William H. Gates Hall, was completed and occupied in September 2003, funded by and named after William H. Gates Sr., the father of Microsoft-founder Bill Gates. Its architecture is modern and energy-efficient, with windows and skylights allowing natural light to fill the library and corridors. The school was previously located in the second Condon Hall from 1974–2003, located several blocks west of the main campus. From 1933-74 the law school occupied the first Condon Hall in The Quad, which was renamed "Gowen Hall" in 1974.

== Academics ==
=== Admissions and costs ===
For the class entering in 2023, the school accepted 34.67% of applicants, with 21.73% of those accepted enrolling. The average enrollee had a 164 LSAT score and 3.74 undergraduate GPA.

The total cost of attendance (indicating the cost of tuition, fees, and living expenses) at UW School of Law for the 2013–2014 academic year is $49,734 for Washington residents and $62,775 for non-residents. The Law School Transparency estimated debt-financed cost of attendance for three years is $207,401.

=== Degrees and curriculum ===
The School of Law offers the Juris Doctor (J.D.) degree along with Master of Laws (LL.M.), Master of Jurisprudence (M.J.) and Ph.D. degrees.

J.D. students can also choose from one of nine specializations: Asian law, dispute resolution, environmental law, global business, health law, intellectual property, international and comparative law, business & entrepreneurship, and public service law. The law school also offers the opportunity to undertake a concurrent degree program, such as a J.D./Master of Business Administration (M.B.A.) dual degree.

The Master of Jurisprudence (M.J.) program is designed for non-lawyers who seek a deeper knowledge of law and regulations. It serves as both an introduction to law in general and a specialization in students' specific legal interests, building useful, marketable skills and teaching students to recognize and respond to legal issues in their professional careers. The M.J. program holds several Information Sessions in Winter and Spring.

Students who already hold J.D. degrees can seek an LL.M. degree in one of the school's programs: global business, intellectual property law and policy, tax, general law, health law, Asian and comparative law, or law of sustainable international development. A PhD. degree is also available in Asian and comparative law.

=== Clinical law programs and centers ===
The UW School of Law clinical law program started in 1979. Nearly 60% of each JD class enrolls in one of the following clinics: Berman Environmental Law, Children and Youth Advocacy, Entrepreneurial Law, Federal Tax, Immigration Law, Innocence Project Northwest, Mediation, Technology Law and Public Policy, and Tribal Court Public Defense.

The UW School is home to several centers and projects, including Global Business Law Institute, Asian Law Center, Center for Advanced Study & Research on Intellectual Property (CASRIP), Center for Law in Science and Global Health, Global Health & Justice Project, Native American Law Center, and Shidler Center for Law, Commerce & Technology.

The University of Washington Information School also offers an affiliated law librarianship program, providing the highest level of preparation for a career in legal information.

=== Scholarly publications ===
The School has four legal publications: Washington International Law Journal, the Washington Journal of Social and Environmental Justice (formerly the Washington Journal of Environmental Law & Policy), the Washington Journal of Law, Technology & Arts, and Washington Law Review.

==== Washington Law Review ====
The Washington Law Review is the flagship law review at the University of Washington. The first Washington Law Review was established in 1919 and published only a single volume, while the current publication history starts in 1925. From 1936 to 1961, the journal was titled Washington Law Review and State Bar Journal. The Law Review publishes an annual volume of legal scholarship consisting of four issues.

=== Employment ===
According to UW School of Law's official 2013 ABA-required disclosures, 64.5% of the Class of 2013 obtained full-time, long-term, bar passage-required employment nine months after graduation, excluding solo-practitioners. UW School of Law ranked 34th among ABA-approved law schools in terms of the percentage of 2013 graduates with non-school-funded, full-time, long-term, bar passage required jobs nine months after graduation.

UW School of Law's Law School Transparency under-employment score is 15.8%, indicating the percentage of the Class of 2013 unemployed, pursuing an additional degree, or working in a non-professional, short-term, or part-time job nine months after graduation. 88.5% of the Class of 2013 was employed in some capacity while 2.7% were pursuing graduate degrees and 8.7% were unemployed nine months graduation.

Bar passage rate in July 2013 was 93.8%.

== Campus ==
William H. Gates Hall opened in September 2003. The building houses classrooms, student lounge, a coffee/snack kiosk, locker areas, the Marian Gould Gallagher Law Library, and faculty, administration and student organization offices.

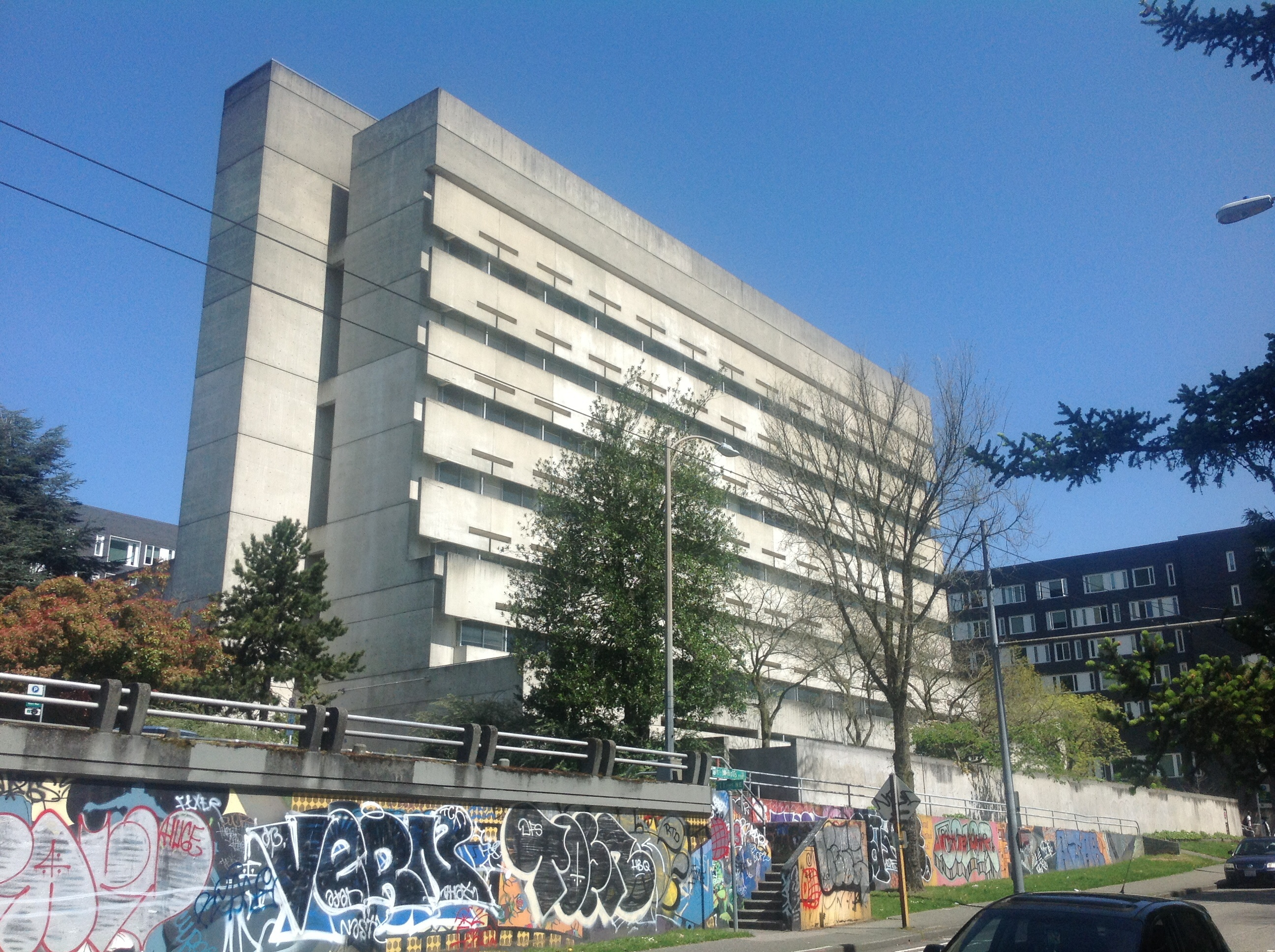
Condon Hall, prior site of the University Washington School of Law

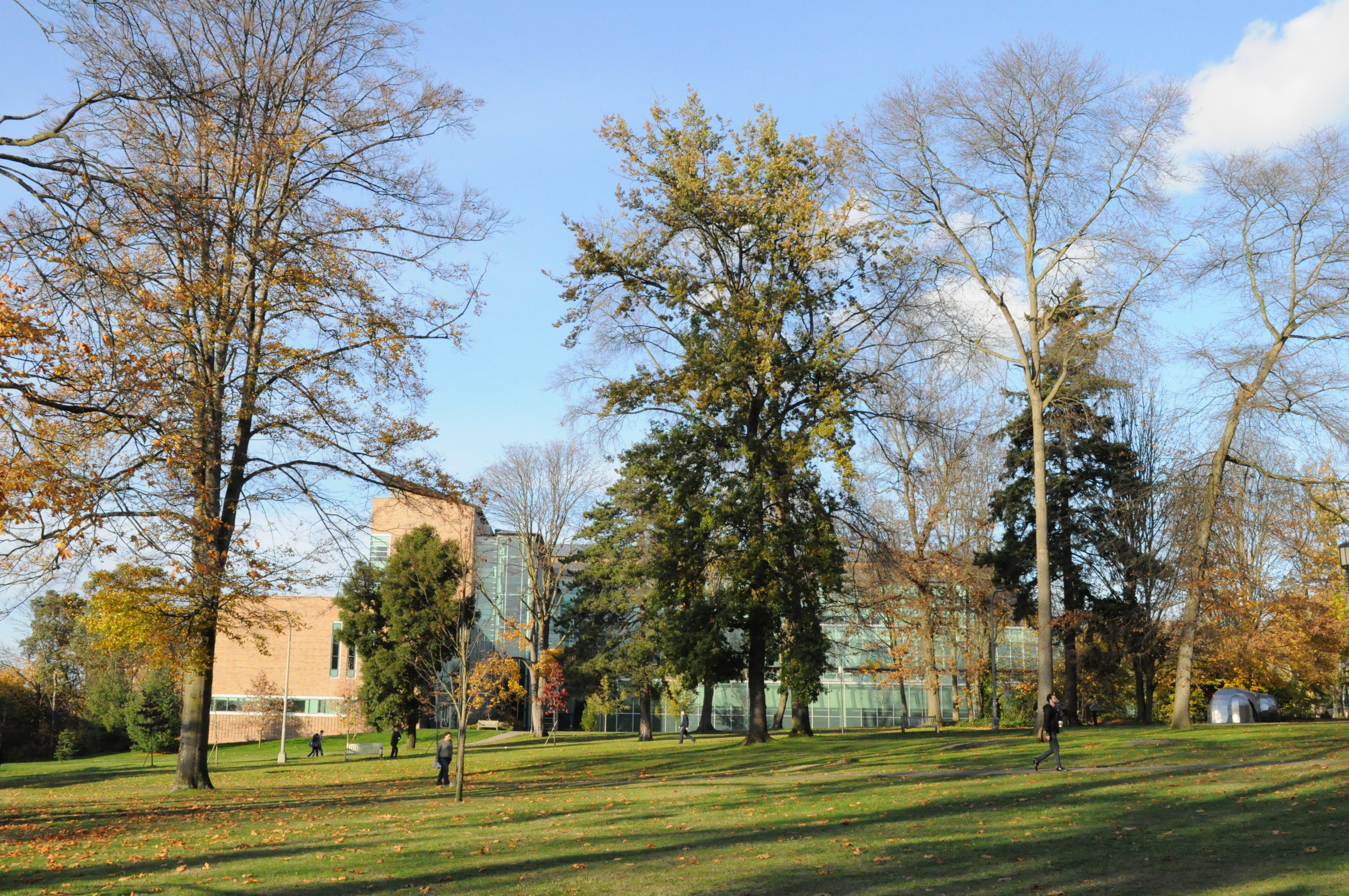
University Washington School of Law (William H. Gates Hall), 2009

U.S. News & World Report has ranked the law librarianship program at the School at #1 in the country for the past three years.

== See also ==
- Dan Fenno Henderson
