= Pacific Health Summit =

- Formation: 2005; 21 years ago
- Type: conference
- Headquarters: 1414 NE 42nd Street, Suite 300 Seattle, WA 98105
- Location: Seattle
- Website: pacifichealthsummit.org and nbr.org

The goal of the Pacific Health Summit is to connect science, industry, and policy for a healthier world. Traditionally, the main work of the Summit has been an annual meeting, where top decision makers convene to discuss how to realize the dream of a healthier future through the effective utilization of scientific advances, combined with industrial innovation and appropriate policies. In autumn of 2012 on the heels of its eight major conference, the Summit shifted its focus from an annual meeting to more targeted work that builds on the past themes and concrete outcomes. As it has since 2005, the Summit will continue to provide a year-round forum for world leaders to grapple with problems and solutions, share best practices, and forge effective collaborations.

== History ==
The first Pacific Health Summit was held in Seattle, Washington, in 2005 with foundational support from the Bill & Melinda Gates Foundation and the Russell Family Foundation. It was the co-creation of 2001 Nobel Prize in physiology or medicine winner Leland H. Hartwell, businessman and philanthropist George F. Russell Jr., Co-chair of the Bill & Melinda Gates Foundation William H. Gates Sr., and Founding Director of the National Bureau of Asian Research’s Center for Health and Aging Michael Birt. NBR has been the Secretariat of the Summit since the inaugural 2005 conference.

Birt, founding executive director of the Summit, stepped down from his role as NBR’s Center for Health and Aging director in 2009, and from his role as executive director in 2012, handing the mantle to Claire Topal, the Summit's managing director, who ran the Summit and managed the team from 2009-2012. She now serves as senior advisor for international health to NBR. Nualchan Sakchalathorn, the Summit’s project director, served on the Summit team from 2007-2012.

Building on Bill Gates Sr.'s strong personal support, in 2007 Tachi Yamada, then president of Global Health at the Bill & Melinda Gates Foundation, took on a decisive leadership role and formally established the Foundation as the Summit's third co-presenting organization.

In 2008, the Wellcome Trust joined the Summit as the fourth official co-presenting organization, and trust director, Sir Mark Walport, joined the executive committee. Both Sir William Castell, chairman of the Wellcome Trust, who has participated in the Summit since its first year, and Sir Mark provided crucial leadership as the Summit began its rotation in London for the annual meeting.

Peter Neupert, then corporate vice president for health solutions strategy for Microsoft, and Craig Mundie, chief research and strategy officer of Microsoft, consistently provided a private sector perspective to the Summit's strategic discussions. Additionally, GE Healthcare, through Bill Castell in 2005, has always provided critical advice and perspective, as well as the critical founding sponsorship for the annual meeting.

== Outcomes ==
The Summit has been a catalyst for partnerships, and the setting of several global health announcements. In 2007, during a speech at the Summit, Margaret Chan, Director-General of the World Health Organization, publicized “a new initiative to establish a world stockpile of vaccines to prepare for the threat of pandemic influenza.” At the Summit in 2009, Sanofi bolstered that stockpile with 100 million donated doses of flu vaccine. Other partnerships furthered by, or formed at, the Summit have helped to lead to the establishment of the MSD Wellcome Trust Hilleman Laboratories, the Access to Nutrition Index, the Critical Path to TB Drug Regimens, and a cervical cancer vaccination deal between Merck & Co. and Qiagen. Additionally, the denial of a US visa for 2009 Summit participant Paul Thorn of the Tuberculosis Survival Project, due to his HIV positive status, became the impetus behind the repeal of a US travel restriction law on individuals carrying the HIV/AIDs virus.

== Publications, Videos, and Photos ==
The Summit Secretariat, the Center for Health and Aging at The National Bureau of Asian Research, publishes reports, videos, and photos of Summit sessions and workshops. The organization also produces expert interviews and thought pieces with Summit participants on past themes and current global health topics. Prior to each Summit, the Center publishes a ‘Calls for Collaboration’ report. The publication contains submissions from organizations inviting Summit participants to partner and collaborate around specific areas of need.

== Past Themes ==
- 2012: Affordability and Technologies for Health
- 2011: Vaccines
- 2010: Maternal and Newborn Health
- 2009: The Global Nutrition Challenge
- 2008: Multidrug-resistant Tuberculosis
- 2007: Pandemics
- 2006: Early Health
- 2005: Science, Innovation, and the Future of Health
