= Dan Fenno Henderson =

American university professor

Dan Fenno Henderson (May 24, 1921 – March 14, 2001) was a university professor who established the Asian law program at the University of Washington.

== Biography ==
Henderson was born in 1921 in Chelan, Washington. He attended Whitman College in Walla Walla. He graduated in 1944 as Phi Beta Kappa. He was drafted into the U.S. Army. He was given a choice on whether to learn Chinese or Japanese; he chose to learn Japanese. He attended the U.S. Army Japanese Language School, located at the University of Michigan. At the university, he received a Bachelor of Arts degree in Oriental Studies in 1945. By the time he arrived in Japan, World War II had ended. Under Douglas MacArthur, he became the head of censorship of the Army force occupying Hokkaido. After he finished his military service, under the GI Bill, Henderson attended Harvard Law School. After graduating from there in 1949, he attended the University of California, Berkeley. In 1955, he graduated with a doctorate.

Henderson taught at the University of Washington School of Law from 1962 to 1991. Henderson authored and coauthored ten significant books related to Japanese law, and he wrote almost 100 articles and other works. Daniel Harrington Foote, author of Law in Japan: A Turning Point, said "These works have had a tremendous impact on scholars and practitioners alike."

Henderson established the Pacific Rim Law & Policy Journal.

Henderson died on March 14, 2001, in Seattle.

== Publications ==
- Hattori, Takaaki, Dan Fenno Henderson, Yasuhei Taniguchi, Pauline C. Reich, and Hiroto Miyake. Civil Procedure in Japan. Juris Pub., 2000. ISBN 1-57823-081-0, 9781578230815.
- Henderson, Dan Fenno. Conciliation and Japanese Law: Tokugawa and Modern, Volume 1. University of Washington Press.
- Henderson, Dan Fenno. Conciliation and Japanese Law: Tokugawa and Modern, Volume 2. University of Washington Press, June 1, 1965. ISBN 0-295-73749-2, 9780295737492.
- Henderson, Dan Fenno. Foreign Enterprise in Japan: Laws and Policies. University of North Carolina Press, 1973. ISBN 0807812102, 9780807812105.
- Henderson, Dan Fenno. Justiciability in U.S./Japanese Disputes. University of Washington School of Law, 1982.
- Henderson, Dan Fenno. Village "Contracts" in Tokugawa Japan: Fifty Specimens With English Translations and Comments. University of Washington Press, 1975. ISBN 0-295-95405-1, 9780295954059.
- Henderson, Dan Fenno. "Chapter One The Role of Lawyers in Japan." in Thyssen-Stiftung, Fritz (editor) Japan, Economic Success and Legal System. Walter de Gruyter, 1997. ISBN 3-11-015160-X, 9783110151602.
- In: Yanagida, Yukio, Daniel H. Foote, Edward Stokes Johnson, Jr., J. Mark Ramseyer, and Hugh T. Scogin, Jr. Law and Investment in Japan: Cases and Materials. East Asian Legal Studies Program, Harvard Law School, 2000. ISBN 0674005090, 9780674005099:
  - Henderson, Dan Fenno. "Foreign Enterprise in Japan: Laws and Policies." 173-174 (1973). p. 56
  - Haley, John Owen, Daniel H. Foote, and Dan Fenno Henderson. "Law and the Legal Process in Japan." Part II, 75-78 (1994). p. 57
