= USS Salt Lake City (SSN-716) =

Los Angeles-class nuclear-powered attack submarine of the US Navy

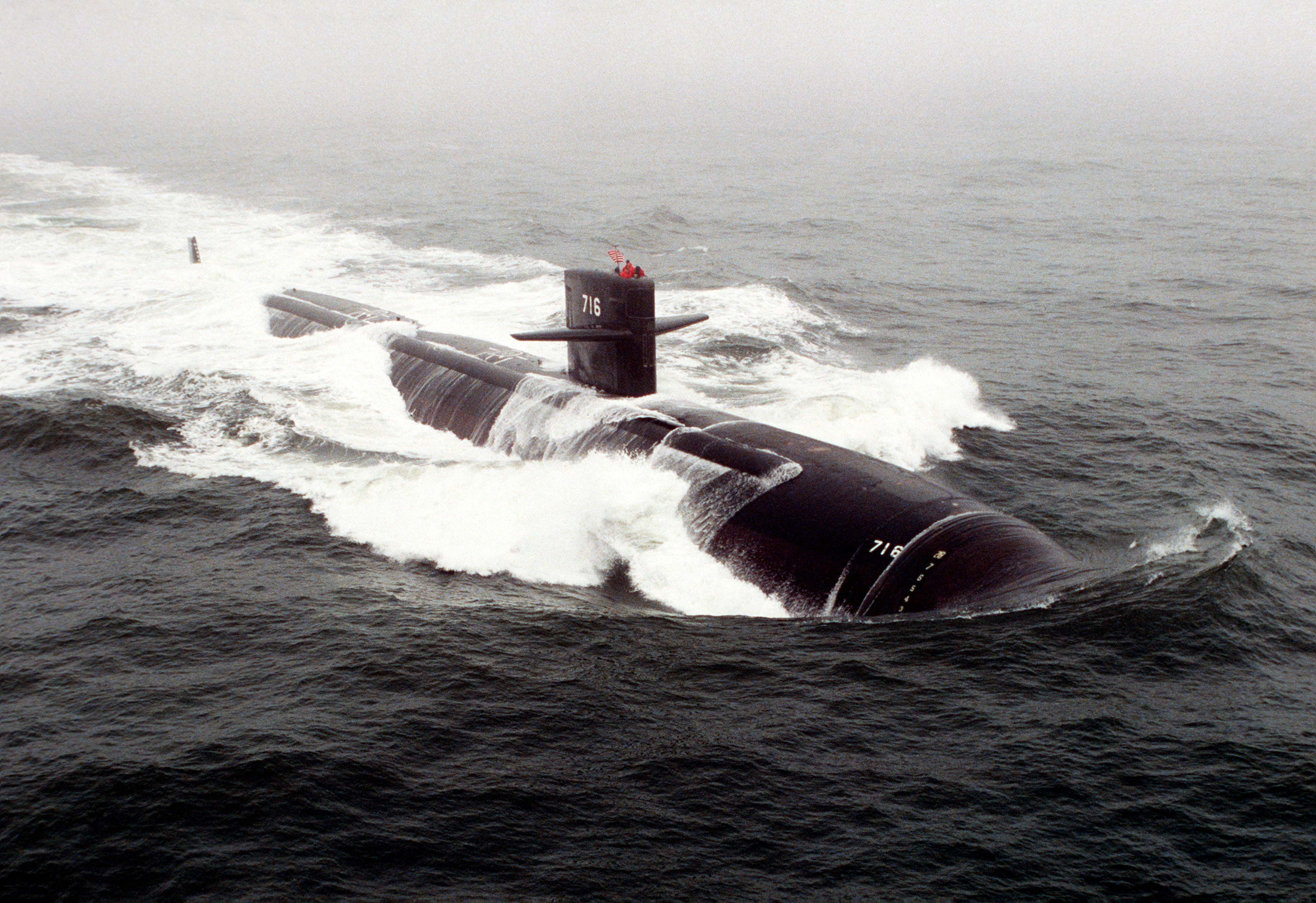
- USS Salt Lake City

History

United States
- Name: USS Salt Lake City
- Namesake: Salt Lake City, Utah
- Ordered: 15 September 1977
- Builder: Newport News Shipbuilding and Dry Dock Company
- Laid down: 26 August 1980
- Launched: 16 October 1982
- Commissioned: 12 May 1984
- Decommissioned: 15 January 2006
- Stricken: 15 January 2006
- Fate: Scrapped as of November 30, 2019
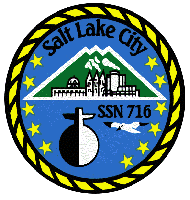
- Badge

General characteristics
- Class & type: Los Angeles-class submarine
- Displacement: 5747 tons light, 6098 tons full, 351 tons dead
- Length: 110.3 m (362 ft)
- Beam: 10 m (33 ft)
- Draft: 9.7 m (32 ft)
- Propulsion: one S6G reactor
- Range: Unlimited distance; 20–25 years
- Complement: 12 officers, 98 enlisted

USS Salt Lake City (SSN-716), was a Los Angeles-class submarine, the second ship of the United States Navy to be named for Salt Lake City, Utah. The contract to build her was awarded to Newport News Shipbuilding and Dry Dock Company in Newport News, Virginia on 15 September 1977 and her keel was laid down on 26 August 1980. She was launched on 16 October 1982 sponsored by Mrs. Kathleen Garn, and commissioned on 12 May 1984.

Actor Scott Glenn trained aboard, and was installed as (honorary) commander for a brief time, aboard Salt Lake City in preparation for his part as Bart Mancuso, Captain of USS Dallas in the film The Hunt for Red October.

Salt Lake City was featured in The History Channel's Mail Call when R. Lee Ermey answered viewer questions about life inside a submarine.

On 22 October 2004, Salt Lake City returned from a deployment with the USS John C. Stennis carrier strike group in the western Pacific Ocean, after surging, over a month ahead of schedule, in support of Summer Pulse '04. Port calls during the deployment included Guam, Sasebo, Yokosuka, Singapore, and Oahu, Hawaii.

Salt Lake City conducted an inactivation ceremony in San Diego on 26 October 2005, then departed for a transit under the polar ice. On 15 January 2006 she was decommissioned at the Portsmouth Naval Shipyard. Over a year later, the hulk was taken under tow, arriving on 8 May 2007 at Puget Sound Naval Shipyard, where she was recycled and scrapped on November 30, 2019.

== Awards ==
Salt Lake City earned numerous awards during her eight full deployments, including three Battle "E" Battle Efficiency Awards, two Navy Unit Commendations, and four Meritorious Unit Commendations.

- 29 May 2005 – 7 July 2005 – Secretary of the Navy Letter of Commendation
- 1 July 2003 – 31 December 2004 – Meritorious Unit Commendation *Awarded to units assigned to Carrier Strike Group 7
- 1 April 2004 – 31 October 2004 – Meritorious Unit Commendation
- 1 January 2002 – 31 December 2002 – Navy E Ribbon
- 1 March 2000 – 31 August 2000 – Secretary of the Navy Letter of Commendation
- 1 January 1999 – 31 December 1999 – Navy E Ribbon
- 1 September 1998 – 1 December 1998 – Meritorious Unit Commendation
- 2 January 1997 – 24 February 1997 – Armed Forces Expeditionary Medal
- 1 March 1992 – 1 March 1995 – Meritorious Unit Commendation *Awarded to units assigned to Submarine Squadron 3
- 1 October 1988 – 30 September 1989 – Navy E Ribbon
- 1 January 1988 – 1 July 1988 – Navy Unit Commendation
- 1 April 1986 – 1 October 1986 – Navy Unit Commendation
