= Washington Law Review =

- Discipline: Law
- Language: English

Publication details
- History: 1919–present
- Frequency: Quarterly

Standard abbreviations
- Bluebook: Wash. L. Rev.
- ISO 4: Wash. Law Rev.

Indexing
- ISSN: 1942-9983
- OCLC no.: 818992586

Links
- Journal homepage; Online edition

The Washington Law Review is the flagship law review at the University of Washington School of Law. The first Washington Law Review was established in 1919 and published only a single volume, while the current publication history starts in 1925. From 1936 to 1961, the journal was titled Washington Law Review and State Bar Journal. The Law Review publishes an annual volume of legal scholarship consisting of four issues.
