= Herbert Henry Gowen =

Anglican missionary and orientalist

Herbert H. Gowen
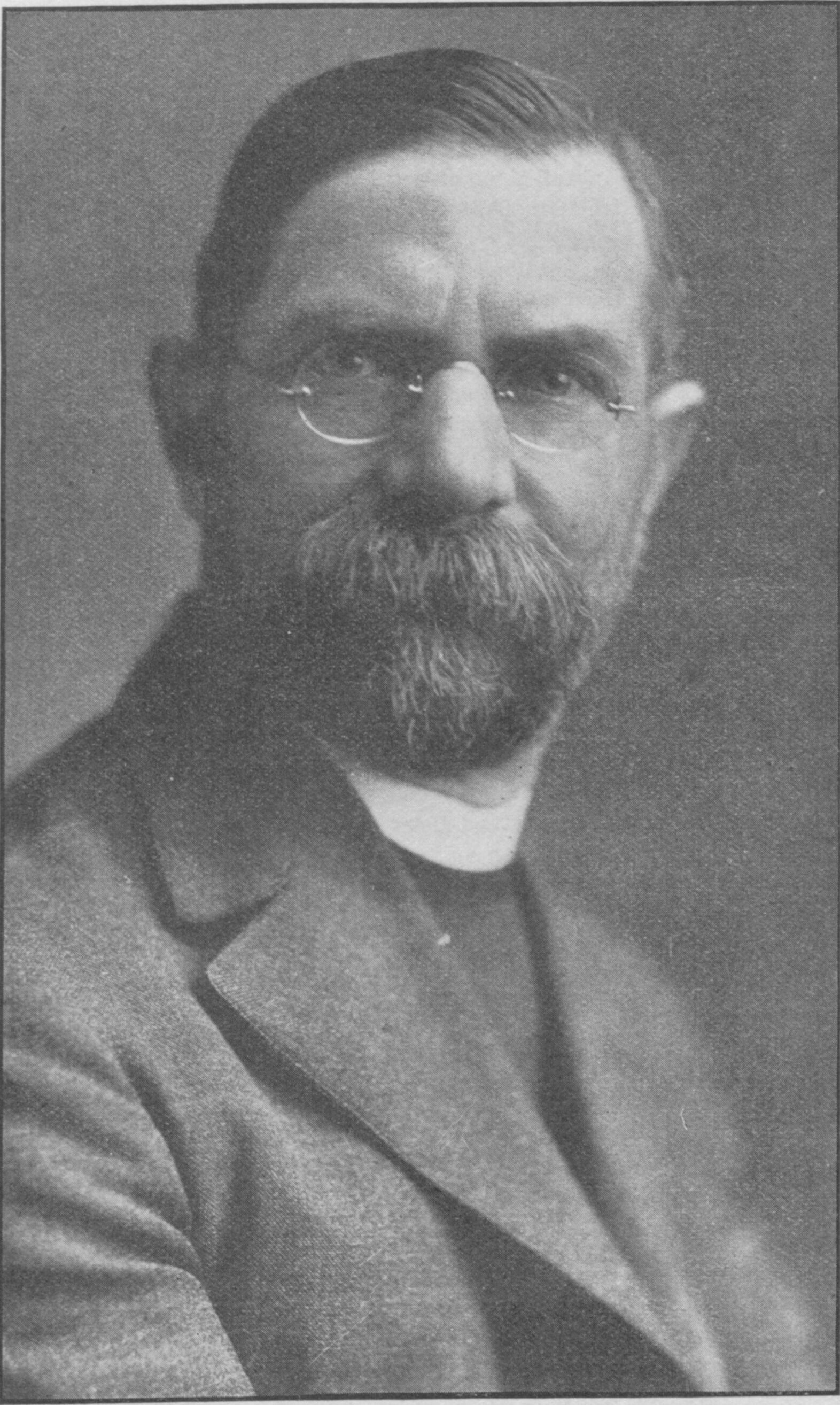
- Herbert H. Gowen, circa 1917
- Born: 1864; Yarmouth, United Kingdom
- Died: 1960 (aged 95–96)
- Education: St Augustine's College
- Occupations: Deacon, professor

Herbert Henry Gowen (1864–1960) was an Anglican missionary and orientalist who wrote on the history of China and Japan and was long associated with the University of Washington.

== Early life and education ==
Herbert Gowen was born in Yarmouth, England and earned a B.A. degree from St. Augustine's College in 1886. He was ordained a deacon in the Church of England the same year.

== Career ==
=== Missionary work ===
Following his ordination, Gowen left to Hawaii at the invitation of Alfred Willis, then the Anglican bishop of Honolulu. Willis was away when Gowen arrived, but he was greeted by a group of Chinese Christians from Kohala and led a service the following Sunday in what is considered the "beginning of St. Peter's Church, Honolulu".

Gowen helped found the Chinese mission school in Honolulu, Hawaii where, among the students, was Sun Yat-sen. Gowen remained in Honolulu for four years, serving as the curate of the Cathedral of Saint Andrew, and as chaplain to the Hawaiian Royal Family. From 1890 to 1897 Gowen served in Canada, as curate of Holy Trinity Cathedral and as rector of St. Barnabas Church in New Westminster, British Columbia. He left Canada to continue on to the United States, serving as rector of Seattle's Protestant Episcopal Trinity Church and establishing St. Peter's Japanese Mission.

=== University of Washington ===
In 1909 Gowen became the founding chair of the University of Washington's Department of Oriental Subjects, a post he would hold until 1929. Gowen continued to teach at the University of Washington until 1938, and would continue to be affiliated with the university until 1945.

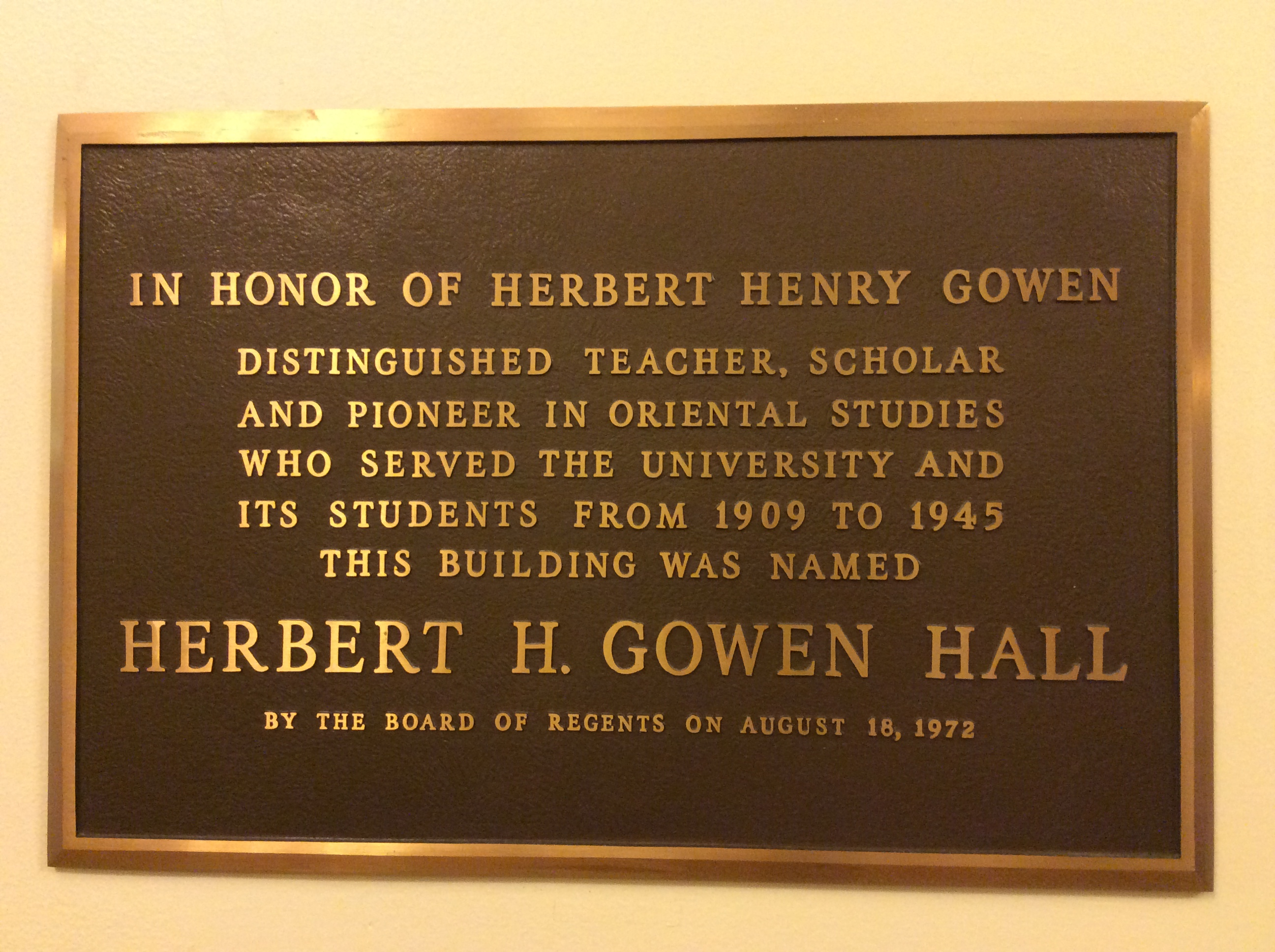
Plaque on the side of Gowen Hall at the University of Washington

== Personal life ==
Gowen was a polyglot and read, in addition to English, Arabic, Chinese, Hebrew, Japanese, and Sanskrit.

In 1977 Condon Hall at the University of Washington was renamed Gowen Hall in Gowen's honor. (Note: In 1974 a second building named Condon Hall had been constructed; the name change was done partially to prevent two Condon Halls from existing on campus simultaneously.)

== Bibliography ==
- Five Foreigners in Japan (1936)
- A History of Indian Literature from Vedic Times to the Present Day (1931)
- An Outline History of Japan (1926)
- Asia: A Short History from the Earliest Times to the Present Day (1926)
- The Napoleon of the Pacific, Kamehameha the Great (1919)
- Church Work in British Columbia: Being a Memoir of the Episcopate of Acton Windeyer Sillitoe (1899)
