= Leland H. Hartwell =

American biologist (born 1939)

- Born: October 30, 1939 (age 87); Los Angeles, California, U.S.
- Education: California Institute of Technology; Massachusetts Institute of Technology
- Known for: Cell cycle regulation
- Awards: Rosenstiel Award (1992); Canada Gairdner International Award (1992); Genetics Society of America Medal (1994); Komen Brinker Award (1998); Albert Lasker Award (1998); Massry Prize (2000); Nobel Prize in Physiology or Medicine (2001); Mendel Medal (2001); Medal of Merit (2003)
- Scientific career
- Fields: Biology
- Workplaces: Fred Hutchinson Cancer Research Center; Arizona State University; Biodesign Institute; Amrita Vishwa Vidyapeetham
- Thesis: Studies on the induction of histidase in Bacillus subtilis (1964)
- Doctoral advisor: Boris Magasanik

Leland Harrison "Lee" Hartwell (born October 30, 1939) is an American former president and director of the Fred Hutchinson Cancer Research Center in Seattle, Washington. He shared the 2001 Nobel Prize in Physiology or Medicine with Paul Nurse and Tim Hunt, for their discoveries of protein molecules that control the division (duplication) of cells.

Working in yeast, Hartwell identified the fundamental role of checkpoints in cell cycle control, and CDC genes such as CDC28, which controls the start of the cycle—the progression through G1.

== Education ==
Hartwell attended Glendale High School in Glendale, California, and then received his Bachelor of Science from the California Institute of Technology in 1961. In 1964, he received his PhD in biology from the Massachusetts Institute of Technology. From 1965 to 1968, he worked at the University of California, Irvine as a professor. He moved to the University of Washington in 1968. In a series of experiments from 1970 to 1971, Hartwell discovered the cell division cycle (CDC) genes in baker's yeast (Saccharomyces cerevisiae). These genes regulate the cell cycle and mutations in the genes are involved in some types of cancer.

== Awards and honors ==
In addition to the Nobel Prize, Hartwell has received awards and honors including the Louisa Gross Horwitz Prize from Columbia University in 1995. He became a member of the National Academy of Sciences in 1987. In 1996, Hartwell joined the faculty of Fred Hutchinson Cancer Research Center and in 1997 became its president and director until he retired in 2010.

Hartwell was honored with the Canada Gairdner International Award in 1992. In 1998 he received the Albert Lasker Award for Basic Medical Research, and the Massry Prize from the Keck School of Medicine, University of Southern California in 2000. On July 9, 2003, Washington Governor Gary Locke awarded the Medal of Merit, the state's highest honor, to Hartwell. He is also a recipient of the Komen Brinker Award for Scientific Distinction.

== Research ==
His earliest publications focused on the isolation of temperature sensitive yeast mutants disabled in basic biological processes, including DNA, RNA and protein synthesis. This led to the identification of the CDC (Cell Division Cycle) genes, which function in promoting the progression through cell division, most notably CDC28, which encodes the yeast Cdk kinase. Other significant discoveries include introduction of the concept of cell cycle "checkpoints", which delay cell division when cellular insults are generated and also the identification and characterization of the mating signal transduction pathway.

== Other positions ==
Hartwell is the Chairman of the Scientific Advisory Board at the Canary Foundation, a non-profit organization dedicated to developing new technologies for the early detection of cancer. He is also a founding co-chair of the Pacific Health Summit, and a member of its executive committee. In September 2009, it was announced that Hartwell would join the faculty of Arizona State University as the Virginia G. Piper Chair of Personalized Medicine and co-director of the Biodesign Institute's Center for Sustainable Health with Dr. Michael Birt. He is also adjunct faculty at Amrita University in India and an appointed member at Chang Gung University and Hospital in Taiwan where he serves in an advisory role as Distinguished Faculty for disease biomarker research.

== Lee Hartwell Award ==
This award is given to scientists whose research in yeast has made the most impact in the broader areas of biology. Recipients of the award also give a lecture at the biennial Yeast Genetics Meeting.

- 2016 – Susan Gasser, Friedrich Miescher Institute for Biomedical Research
- 2014 – George Church, Harvard Medical School
- 2012 – Stan Fields, University of Washington, Seattle
- 2010 – Randy Schekman, University of California, Berkeley
- 2008 – Mitsuhiro Yanagida, Kyoto University
- 2006 – Kim Nasmyth, Oxford University
- 2004 – Susan Lindquist, Whitehead Institute
- 2002 – Leland Hartwell, Fred Hutchinson Cancer Research Center
