= Washington International Law Journal =

- Discipline: International Law
- Language: English

Publication details
- Former names: Pacific Rim Law & Policy Journal (1994-2014) ISSN 1066-8632
- History: 1992–present
- Frequency: Triannual

Standard abbreviations
- Bluebook: Wash. Int'l L.J.
- ISO 4: Wash. Int. Law J.

Indexing
- ISSN: 2377-0872
- OCLC no.: 1004528674

The Washington International Law Journal is a triannual law review published by the University of Washington School of Law. It is abstracted and indexed by Cambridge Scientific Abstracts, EBSCOhost, Academic Search Complete, ProQuest, Westlaw, and HeinOnline.

Established in 1990, the Washington International Law Journal (formerly the Pacific Rim Law & Policy Journal) publishes scholarship on foreign, comparative, and international law while fostering the development of student analysis. In order to highlight global perspectives, the Journal does not publish content that privileges U.S. ideas or approaches. The Journal has a particular interest in the Pacific Rim region and actively collaborates with the University of Washington's Asian Law Center. Published three times per year, this peer-reviewed Journal features analysis of legal and policy issues by internationally acclaimed scholars on topics such as constitutional law, human rights, corporate governance, antitrust, intellectual property, and environmental law. The Journal is available both in print and online.

Subjects covered by the journal include antitrust law, constitutional law, corporate governance, environmental law, intellectual property law, and human rights law. The journal covers topics related to international, comparative, and foreign law, with a particular focus on East Asia, Oceania, Russia, and Southeast Asia. In addition, the journal covers topics related to Central and South American countries which also have connections to the Pacific Rim and international waters in that region. It is edited by law students.

The journal was established by Dan Fenno Henderson and started publication in 1992 as the Pacific Rim Law & Policy Journal, obtaining its current title in 2014.
