= Ashley J. Tellis =

American national defense strategist (born 1961)

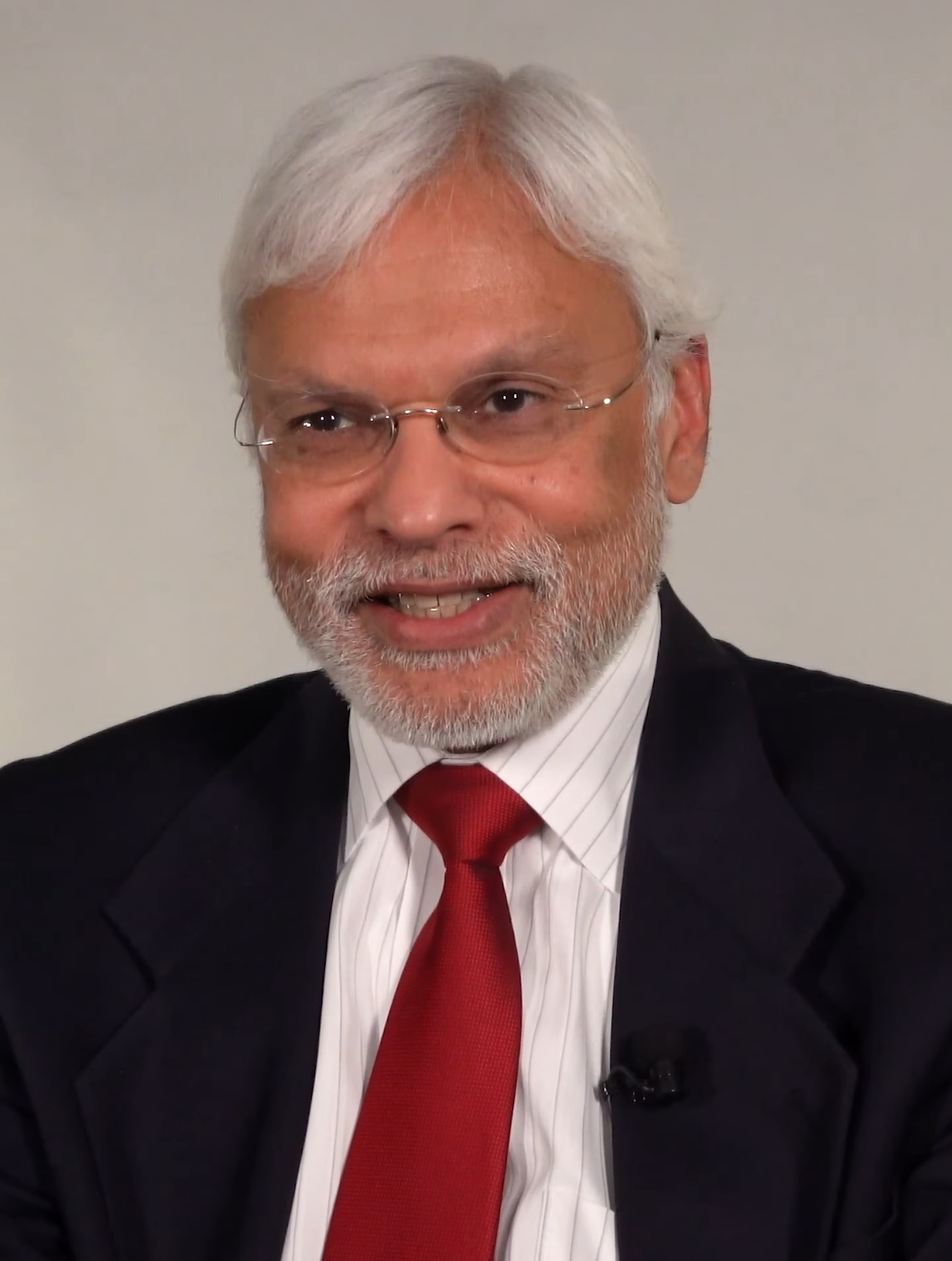
- Tellis in 2023
- Born: Mumbai, India
- Education: University of Chicago (MA, PhD); University of Bombay (BA, MA)

Ashley J. Tellis (born 1961) is an Indian American who was a senior fellow and Tata Chair for Strategic Affairs at the Carnegie Endowment for International Peace specializing in international security, defense, and Asian strategic issues. He previously served as professor of policy analysis at the RAND Graduate School.

== Early life and education ==
Ashley was born to an Indian Christian Roman Catholic family in Mumbai, India. He earned his Bachelor of Arts and Master of Arts in economics from St. Xavier's College, Mumbai at University of Bombay. He later earned a Doctor of Philosophy in political science from the University of Chicago.

== Career ==
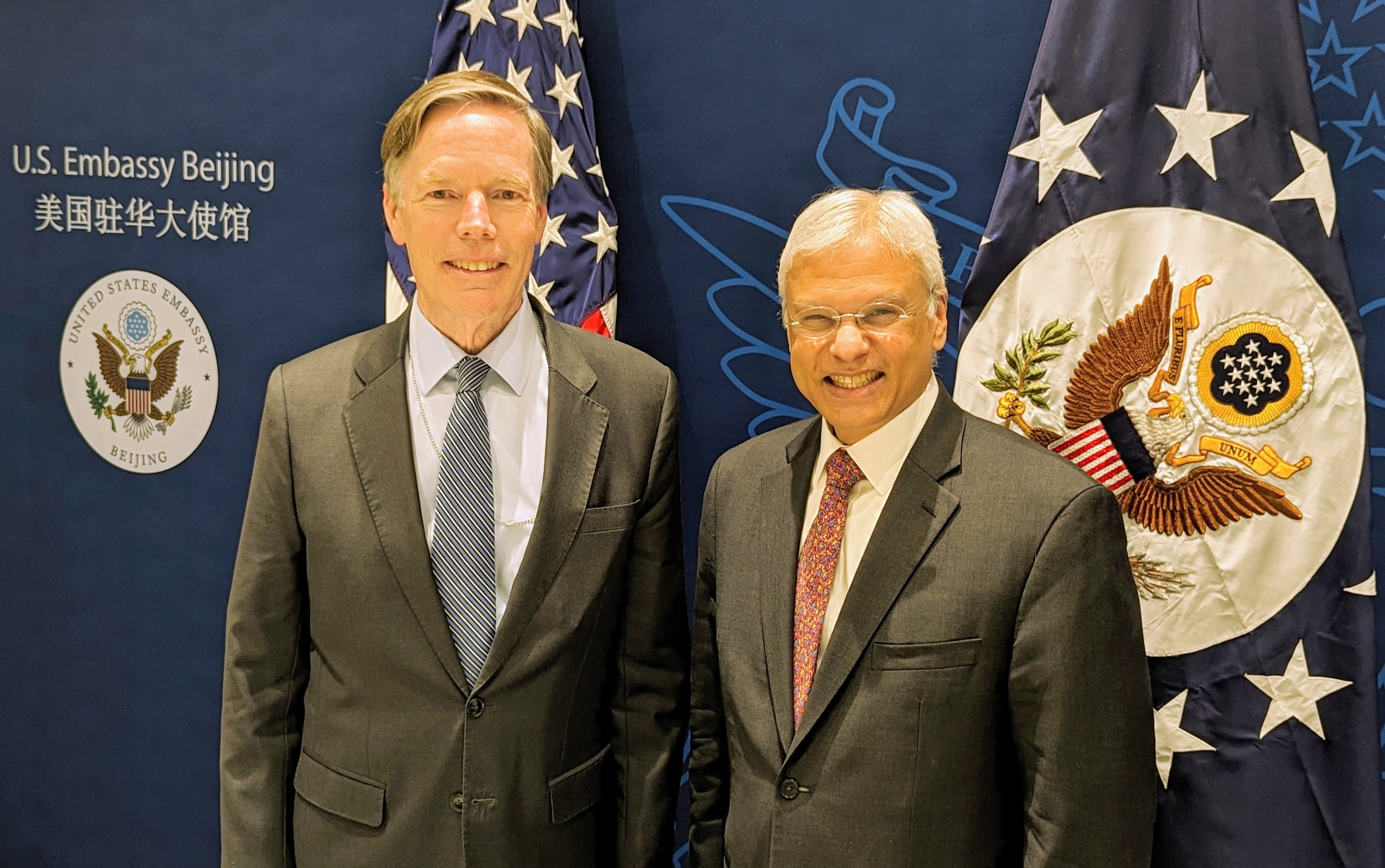
Tellis with ambassador Nicholas Burns at the Embassy of the United States, Beijing.

Ashley was commissioned into the U.S. Foreign Service and served as senior adviser to the ambassador at the Embassy of the United States, New Delhi. He also served on the U.S. National Security Council staff as special assistant to President George W. Bush and senior director for strategic planning and Southwest Asia. and senior director for strategic planning and Southwest Asia.

== Classified documents allegations ==
In October 2025 it was disclosed by the U.S. Department of State that Tellis is under investigation for unauthorized retention of classified documents. He held a top-secret clearance and had access to sensitive information. U.S. authorities found more than a thousand pages of documents marked "TOP SECRET" and "SECRET" in his home, according to court documents.

He was booked under 18 US Code 793(e) of the Espionage Act and was arrested after the Federal Bureau of Investigation raided his home in Vienna, Virginia.

== Books ==
- India's Emerging Nuclear Posture: Between Recessed Deterrent and Ready Arsenal (Publisher: RAND Corporation; ISBN 9780833027740)
- Strategic Asia: Reshaping Economic Interdependence in the Indo-Pacific (Publisher: National Bureau of Asian Research; ISBN 9781939131805)
