= Jackson School of International Studies =

International affairs program of the University of Washington

Coordinates: 47°39′24″N 122°18′21″W

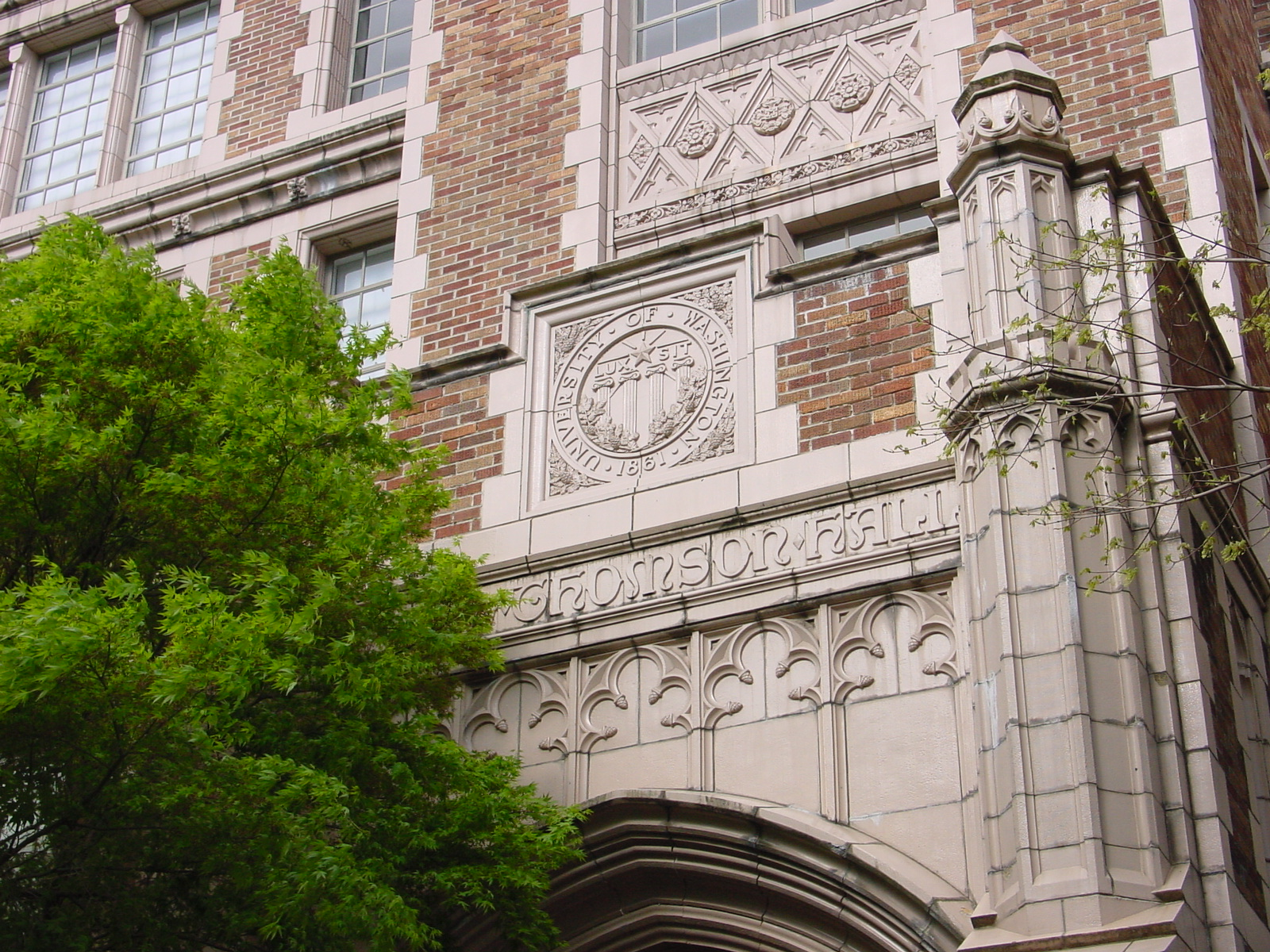
- The school is sited at Thomson Hall
- Other name: Henry M. Jackson School of International Studies
- Former names: Department of Oriental Subjects (1909–1946), Far Eastern and Russian Institute (1946–1978), School of International Studies (1978–1983)
- Established: 1909; 117 years ago
- Parent institution: University of Washington College of Arts and Sciences
- Director: Daniel Hoffman
- Location: Seattle, Washington, United States
- Website: jsis.washington.edu

The Jackson School of International Studies (JSIS; formally Henry M. Jackson School of International Studies) is a department-level school within the Social Sciences Division at the College of Arts and Sciences at the University of Washington. It studies international relations and area studies.

The school was founded in 1909 as the Department of Oriental Subjects, and was renamed in 1983 to honor Washington state politician Henry M. Jackson.

== History ==
The University of Washington established the Department of Oriental Subjects in 1909 under the chairmanship of Herbert Henry Gowen. The department became the School of International Studies in 1976. In 1983, it was renamed the Henry M. Jackson School of International Studies in honor of Washington state politician Henry M. Jackson.

As of 2016, the Jackson School was the United States' largest recipient of United States Department of Education grants in support of area studies and hosted eight National Resource Centers. Its oldest center, the East Asia Center, was established with a grant from the U.S. Department of Defense in 1959 as the Far Eastern Institute. It was followed by the Middle East Center. Other National Resource Centers hosted by the Jackson School are the Canadian Studies Center; Center for Global Studies; Center for European Studies; Ellison Center for Russian, East European and Central Asian Studies; South Asia Center; and Center for Southeast Asia and its Diasporas.

In 2016 the Jackson School hosted the annual meeting of the Association of Professional Schools of International Affairs, of which it is a founding member.

== Instruction ==
The Jackson School offers Bachelor of Arts degrees in six subjects: Asian Studies, Comparative Religion, European Studies, International Studies, Jewish Studies, and Latin American & Caribbean Studies. It also grants Master of Arts degrees and Doctor of Philosophy degrees in International Studies. Since 2015 it has, additionally, offered a Master of Arts in applied International Studies geared towards "mid-career professionals".

The Jackson School is a full member of the Association of Professional Schools of International Affairs (APSIA).

== Publications and collections ==
In addition to its undergraduate journal, Jackson Journal, the school also houses two refereed journals, the Journal of Japanese Studies and the Journal of Korean Studies.

The Sephardic Studies Digital Library Collection is a collection of digitized works concerning Sephardic Jews, at the University of Washington in Seattle. It was created by Stroum Center for Jewish Studies, part of the Jackson School. The collection contains over 1,500 books and other documents primarily in Ladino, also Ottoman Turkish, Hebrew and French, written from the 16th century up to the mid-20th century. "Nearly all" of the material in the library came from families in Seattle, which has the third largest Sephardic community in the United States. The University of Washington says the collection has more volumes than the collections of the Library of Congress or of Harvard University. It is said to be the nation's largest or second largest collection of Ladino texts, and the largest electronic collection of such material. Professor Devin Narr began the collection in 2012.

== Faculty and alumni ==
Notable present and former faculty of the school include Darryl N. Johnson, Jere L. Bacharach, Daniel Chirot, France Winddance Twine, T.J. Pempel, Philip N. Howard, and Charles T. Cross.

Notable graduates of JSIS' programs include Margery Anneberg, Elizabeth J. Perry, Rob McKenna, and Matthew Bannick.

== List of directors ==
- Kenneth B. Pyle (1978 to 1988)
- Anand Yang (2002 to 2010)
- Reşat Kasaba (2010 to 2020)
- Leela Fernandes (2020 to 2022)
- Daniel Hoffman (2023 to Present)

== See also ==
- Daniel J. Evans School of Public Policy and Governance
