= Bill Gates Sr. =

American attorney and civic leader (1925–2020)

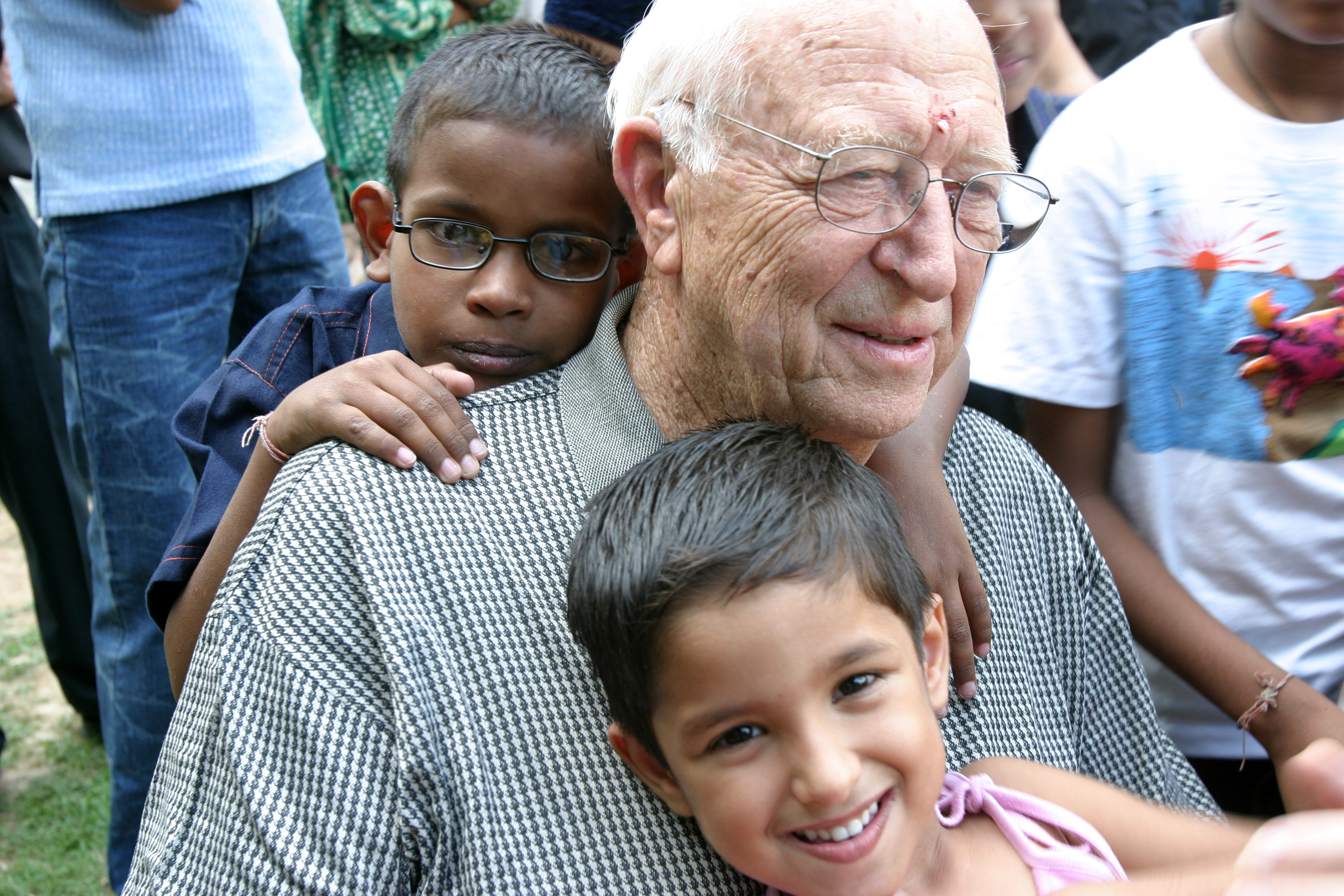
- Gates visiting the Naz Foundation located in India in 2004
- Born: William Henry Gates II; November 30, 1925; Bremerton, Washington, U.S.
- Died: September 14, 2020 (aged 94); Hood Canal, Washington, U.S.
- Education: University of Washington (BA, JD)
- Occupations: Attorney; philanthropist; civic leader
- Spouses: Mary Maxwell (m. 1951; died 1994); Mimi Gardner (m. 1996)
- Children: 3, including Bill

William Henry Gates II (November 30, 1925 – September 14, 2020), better known as Bill Gates Sr., was an American attorney, philanthropist, and civic leader. He was the founder of the law firm Shidler McBroom & Gates (a predecessor of K&L Gates), and also served as president of both the Seattle King County and Washington State Bar associations. He was the father of Bill Gates, co-founder of Microsoft.

== Early life and education ==
Gates was born in Bremerton, Washington, in 1925, and was the son of Lillian Elizabeth Rice (1891–1966) and William Henry Gates (1891–1969), who was himself the son of William Henry Gates, a furniture store owner and gold prospector during the Dawson Gold Rush of 1898. He graduated from Bremerton High School in 1943.

Gates served in the US Army for about 2 years during World War II. He subsequently attended the University of Washington under the G.I. Bill, earning a B.A. in 1949 and a J.D. degree in 1950. While at UW, he was a member of the Chi Psi fraternity.

== Career ==
Gates co-founded the law firm Shidler McBroom & Gates in 1964, which later became a part of Preston Gates & Ellis LLP (PGE). He practiced with the firm until 1998, when it was merged into the firm now known as K&L Gates.

Gates' legal practice focused on corporate, technology and disputes. During his career, he served as president of both the Seattle/King County Bar Association and the Washington State Bar Association.

Gates served on the boards of numerous organizations in the Pacific Northwest, including the Greater Seattle Chamber of Commerce, King County United Way and Planned Parenthood. In 1995, he founded the Technology Alliance, whose mission is to expand technology-based employment in Washington.

In 1998, Gates retired from Preston Gates & Ellis. He served for fifteen years on the Board of Regents of the University of Washington, and until his death was a co-chair of the Bill and Melinda Gates Foundation, which his son Bill and his daughter-in-law Melinda founded. He served as a director for the bulk retail corporation Costco Wholesale from 2003, and was a founding co-chair of the Pacific Health Summit. He served as an honorary chair for the World Justice Project. The project works to lead a global, multidisciplinary effort to strengthen the Rule of Law for the development of communities of opportunity and equity.

Gates co-authored the book Wealth and Our Commonwealth: Why America Should Tax Accumulated Fortunes with Chuck Collins. It is a defense of the policies promoted by the estate tax. He was also the author of the book Showing Up for Life: Thoughts on the Gifts of a Lifetime.

=== Notable cases ===
In 1987, Gates Sr. assisted Howard Schultz in buying the Starbucks coffee chain.

== Personal life ==
In 1951, Gates married Mary Maxwell Gates (née Maxwell) (1929–1994), whom he met at the University of Washington (UW), and they remained married until her death in 1994. They had three children: Kristianne, Bill, and Libby. His two daughters, Kristi Blake and Libby Armintrout, are both active members of the UW community. He was a lifelong supporter of the Washington Huskies college football team.

In 1996, Gates married his second wife Mimi Gardner Gates (b. 1943), who was director of the Seattle Art Museum.

In 2018, it was revealed that Gates was suffering from Alzheimer's disease. He died on September 14, 2020, aged 94, at his beach home on Hood Canal in Washington state. In a tribute, his son said that his "wisdom, generosity, empathy, and humility had a huge influence on people around the world."

== Awards and recognition ==
- Awarded the Distinguished Eagle Scout Award, to acknowledge his business and civic success at least 25 years after earning Eagle Scout rank. 1941.
- President of Seattle–King County Bar Association, 1969–1970
- President of Washington State Bar Association, 1986–1987
- Recipient of University of Washington School of Law Distinguished Alumnus, 1991
- Recipient of American Judicature Society's Herbert Harley Award, 1992
- Served on Board for Judicial Administration, Washington State Supreme Court, 1993–1995
- Served on Board of Regents of the University of Washington, 1997–2012
- Inducted into American Academy of Arts and Sciences, 2003
- William H. Gates Hall at the University of Washington School of Law was named for him in 2003
- Awarded Washington Medal of Merit, 2009
- Recipient of the American Bar Association Medal (2009), the highest honor in the American legal community
- Recipient of Chi Psi Fraternity's Albert S. Bard Award, 2010, for contributions to the intellectual and cultural life of the community
- Recipient of UW Alumni Association's Alumnus Summa Laude Dignatus (ASLD) Award, 2013

Bill Gerberding, who was President of the University of Washington from 1979 to 1995, described Gates as "a good man with a big heart [and] generous public spirit", while Norman Rice, former Mayor of Seattle, characterized Gates' core values as "social justice and economic opportunity".

== Publications ==
- Gates, Bill Sr.; Mackin, Mary Ann (May 11, 2010). Showing Up for Life: Thoughts on the Gifts of a Lifetime. Foreword by Bill Gates (1st ed.). New York: Broadway Books. ISBN 978-0-385-52701-9.
