= List of chiefs of naval operations educated at the United States Naval Academy =

Flag of the Chief of Naval Operations

The Chief of Naval Operations (CNO) is the highest-ranking active duty member of the United States Navy and is a member of the Joint Chiefs of Staff. The CNO reports directly to the Secretary of the Navy for the command, utilization of resources and operating efficiency of the Navy. Of the 29 CNOs, 27 were graduates of the United States Naval Academy (USNA). The Academy is an undergraduate college in Annapolis, Maryland, with the mission of educating and commissioning officers for the Navy and Marine Corps. The Academy is often referred to as Annapolis, while sports media refer to the Academy as "Navy" and the students as "Midshipmen"; this usage is officially endorsed. During the latter half of the 19th century and the first decades of the 20th, the United States Naval Academy was the primary source of U.S. Navy and Marine Corps officers, with the Class of 1881 being the first to provide officers to the Marine Corps. Graduates of the Academy are also given the option of entering the United States Army or United States Air Force. Most Midshipmen are admitted through the congressional appointment system. The curriculum emphasizes various fields of engineering.

This list is drawn from graduates of the Naval Academy who became CNOs. The Academy was founded in 1845 and graduated its first class in 1846. The first alumnus to graduate and go on to become a CNO was William S. Benson, who graduated from the Class of 1877. The current CNO, Jonathan Greenert, is also an Academy graduate. Four graduates subsequently became Chairman of the Joint Chiefs of Staff, three became ambassadors, three were recipients of the Navy Cross, and one was a recipient of the Distinguished Flying Cross.

Over 990 noted scholars from a variety of academic fields are Academy graduates, including 45 Rhodes Scholars and 16 Marshall Scholars. Additional notable graduates include 1 President of the United States, 2 Nobel Prize recipients, 52 astronauts and 73 Medal of Honor recipients.

== Chiefs of Naval Operations ==
"Class year" refers to the alumni's class year, which usually is the same year they graduated. However, in times of war, classes often graduate early. For example, the Class of 1942 actually graduated in 1941. This class became known as the "Pearl Harbor" class.

Name	Class year	Notability	References
William S. Benson	1877	Admiral; first Chief of Naval Operations (CNO) (1915–1919); defined the functions of the new CNO position and strengthened the Navy	
Robert Coontz	1885	Admiral; Chief of Naval Operations (1919–1923); Governor of Guam (1912–1913)	
Edward Walter Eberle	1885	Admiral; Superintendent of the Academy (1915–1919); Chief of Naval Operations (1923–1927)	
Charles Frederick Hughes	1888	Admiral; Chief of Naval Operations (1927–1930); served with the American battleship squadron that operated with the Royal Navy's Grand Fleet at Scapa Flow in the Orkney Islands through World War I	
William V. Pratt	1889	Admiral; Chief of Naval Operations (1930–1933); instructor at the Academy (1900–1902) and (1905–1908)	
William Harrison Standley	1895	Admiral; Signed the London Naval Treaty of 1930 on behalf of the United States; Chief of Naval Operations (1933–1937); United States Ambassador to the Soviet Union (1942–1944)	
William D. Leahy	1897	First Fleet Admiral; Chief of Naval Operations (1937–1939), during World War II; became the first fleet admiral and crafted a future thought leadership; served as Chief of Staff to the Commander in Chief, which was the role model for the first Chairman of the Joint Chiefs of Staff; Governor of Puerto Rico (1939–1940) ambassador to the Vichy French	
Ernest King	1901	Fleet Admiral; Chief of Naval Operations in World War II (1942–1945); Navy Cross recipient	
Harold Rainsford Stark	1903	Admiral; Chief of Naval Operations (1939–1942); veteran of World War I and World War II	
Chester Nimitz	1905	Fleet Admiral; held the dual command of Commander in Chief, United States Pacific Fleet ("CinCPac" pronounced "sink-pack"), for US naval forces and Commander in Chief, Pacific Ocean Areas (CinCPOA), for US and Allied air, land, and sea forces during World War II; Chief of Naval Operations (1945–1947)	
Louis E. Denfeld	1912	Admiral; Chief of Naval Operations (1947–1949); fired for his role in the "Revolt of the Admirals"	
Robert Carney	1916	Admiral; Chief of Naval Operations (1953–1955); Navy Cross recipient	
William Fechteler	1916	Admiral; Chief of Naval Operations (1951–1953) during the Korean War	
Forrest Sherman	1918	Admiral; Chief of Naval Operations (1949–1951); Navy Cross recipient	
Arleigh Burke	1923	Admiral; Chief of Naval Operations (1955–1961); carrier and destroyer commander during World War II; Korean War veteran; Arleigh Burke-class of destroyers was named after him	
George Whelan Anderson, Jr.	1927	Admiral; Chief of Naval Operations (1961–1963), in charge of the blockade of Cuba during the Cuban Missile Crisis; ambassador to Portugal (1963–1966)	
David L. McDonald	1928	Admiral; Chief of Naval Operations (1963–1967) during the early Vietnam War	
Thomas Hinman Moorer	1933	Admiral; Chief of Naval Operations (1967–1970); chairman of the Joint Chiefs of Staff (1970–1974)	
James L. Holloway III	1943	Admiral; Chief of Naval Operations (1974–1978); combat veteran of World War II, Korea, and Vietnam; established the Nuclear Powered Carrier Program; son of Admiral James L. Holloway, Jr.	
Elmo R. Zumwalt, Jr.	1943	Admiral; Chief of Naval Operations (1970–1974) during Vietnam War	
Thomas B. Hayward	1948	Admiral; Chief of Naval Operations (1978–1982); recipient of the Distinguished Flying Cross during the Korean War	
James D. Watkins	1949	Admiral; Chief of Naval Operations (1982–1986); Secretary of Energy (1989–1993); chairman of United States Commission on Ocean Policy that crafted Oceans Act of 2000	
Carlisle Trost	1953	Admiral; Chief of Naval Operations (1986–1990); submarine officer; graduated first in his class; Olmstead Scholar	
Frank B. Kelso	1956	Admiral; Chief of Naval Operations (1990–1994); Supreme Allied Commander, Atlantic; submarine officer; Secretary of the Navy (acting) (1993)	
Jay L. Johnson	1968	Admiral; Chief of Naval Operations (1996–2000); aviator	
Michael Mullen	1968	Admiral; Chief of Naval Operations (2005–2007); chairman of the Joint Chiefs of Staff (2007–2011)	
Gary Roughead	1973	Admiral; Chief of Naval Operations (2007–2011); Surface Warfare Officer (SWO)	
Jonathan W. Greenert	1975	Admiral; Chief of Naval Operations (2011–2015); Submarine officer (SS)	
John M. Richardson	1982	Admiral; Chief of Naval Operations (2015–2019); Director of Navy Nuclear Propulsion (2012–2015); Submarine Warfare Officer (SS)	
Michael Gilday	1985	Admiral; Chief of Naval Operations (2019–present); Surface Warfare Officer (SWO)	

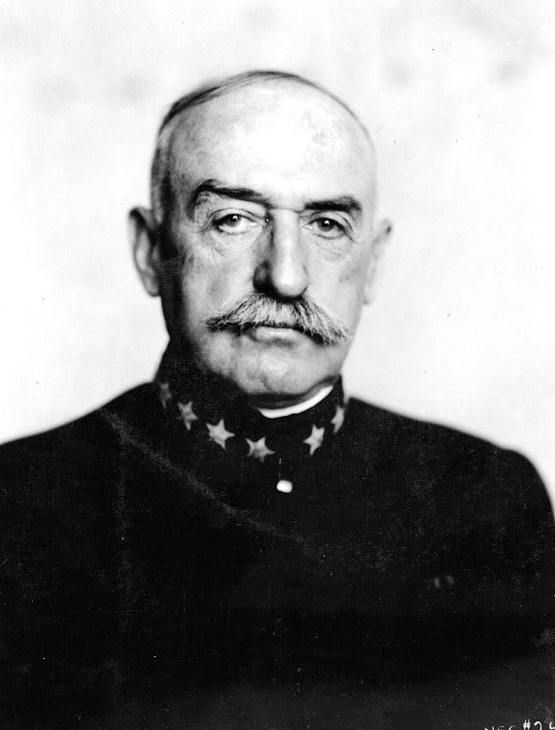
William Benson

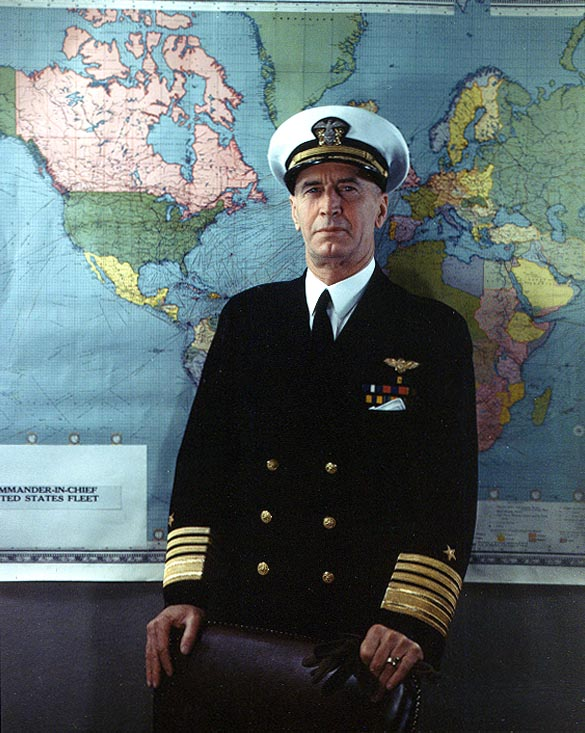
Ernest J. King

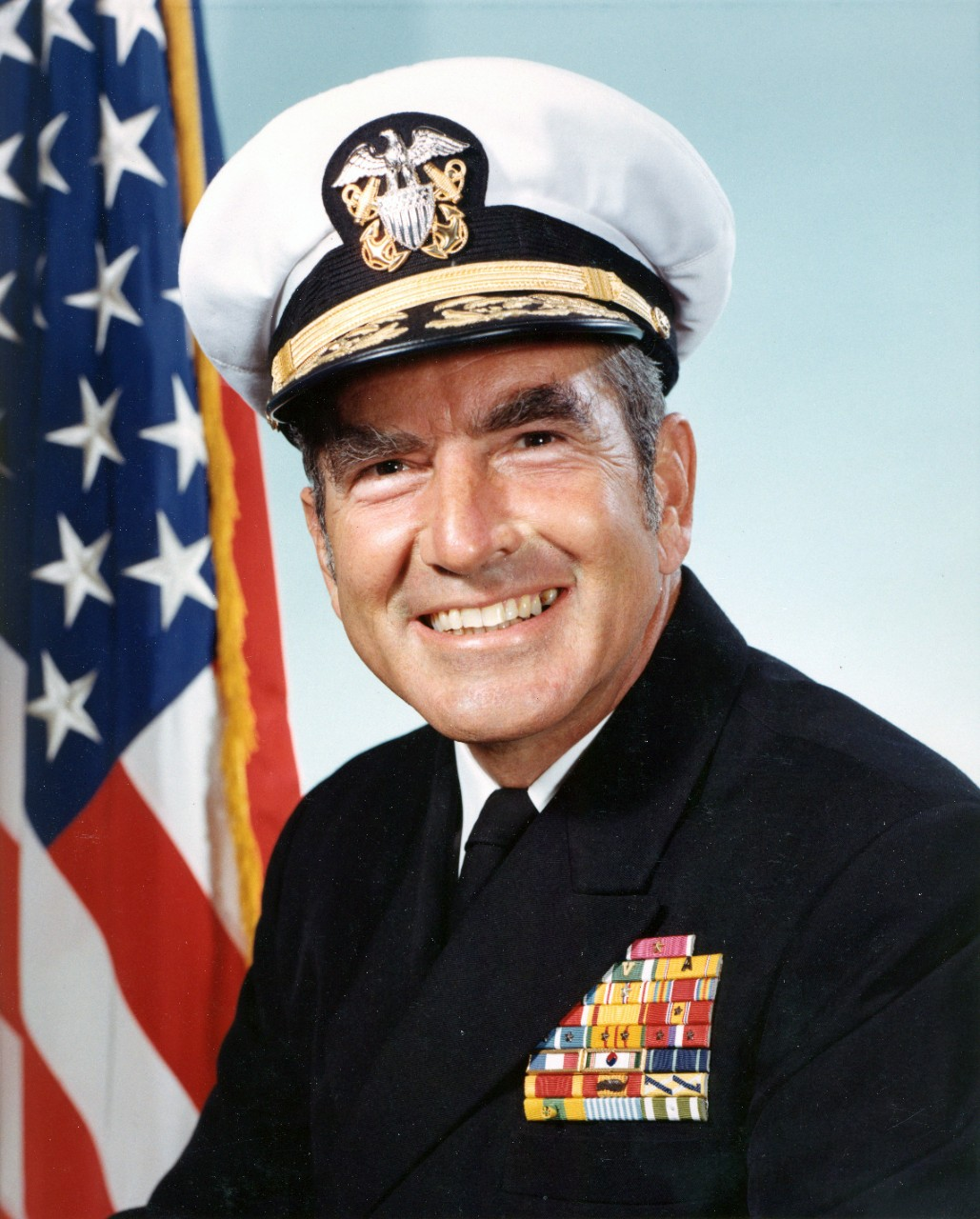
Elmo Zumwalt

CDR James L. Hollowell III, seated in his Douglas A4D Skyhawk attack aircraft, while serving as commanding officer of Attack Squadron 83 (VA-83) on USS Essex (CVA-9)

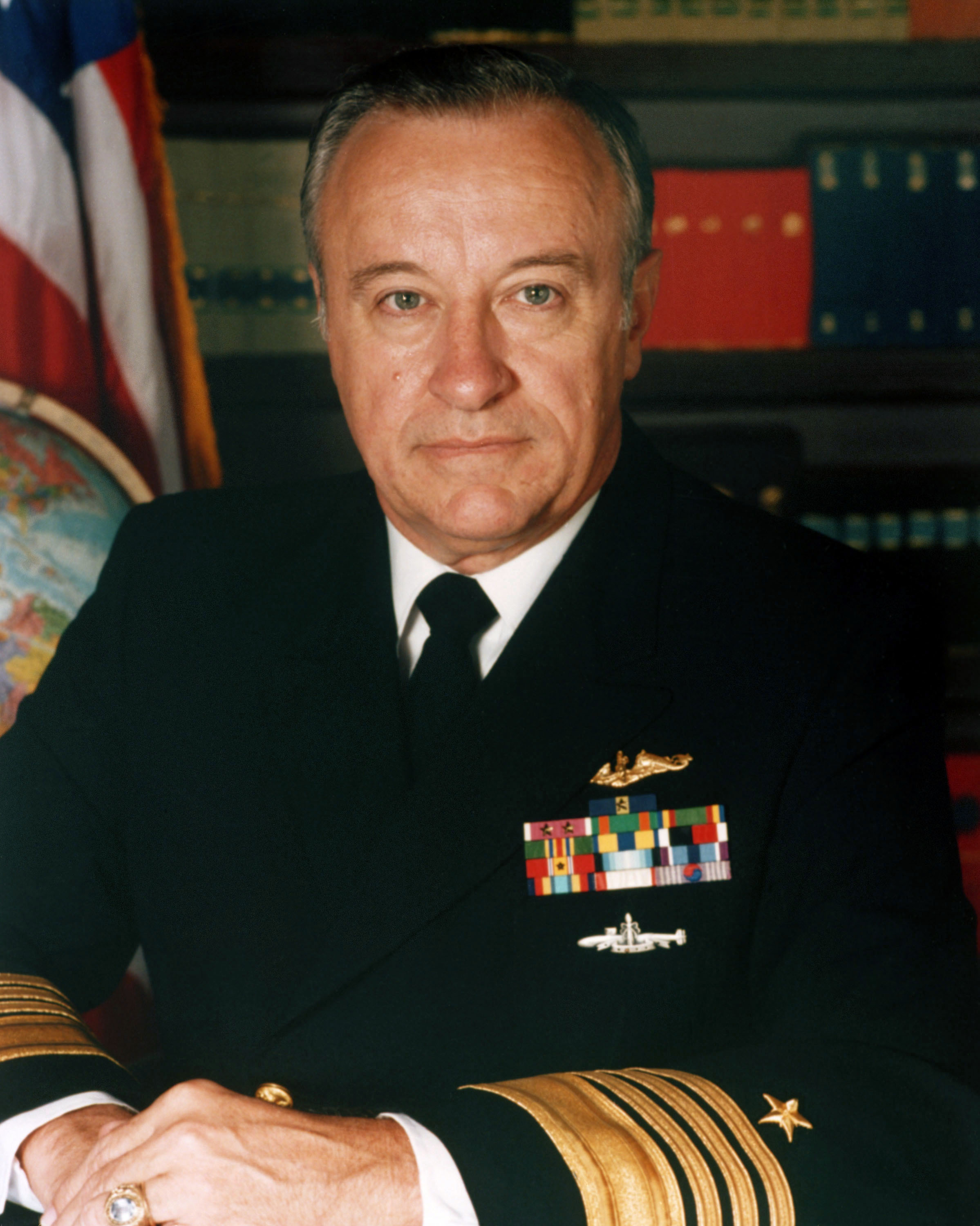
Carlisle Trost

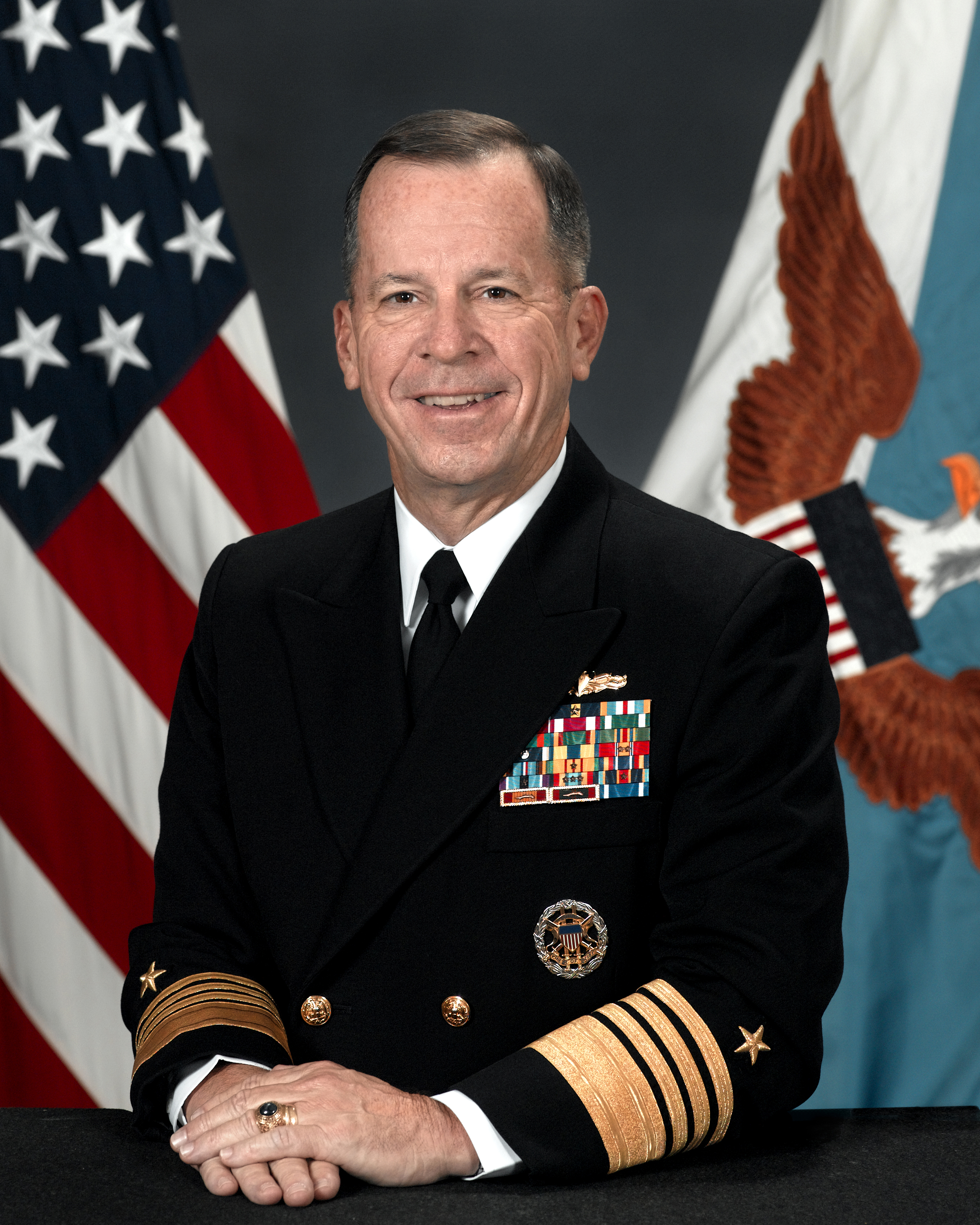
Michael Mullen
