= Joint Ocean Commission Initiative =

- Founded: 2005
- Type: Commission
- Purpose: Ocean policy reform
- Region served: United States
- Key people: Christine Todd Whitman; Norman Y. Mineta
- Website: jointoceancommission.org

The Joint Ocean Commission Initiative (commonly referred to as the Joint Initiative) is a bipartisan, collaborative group in the United States that aims to "accelerate the pace of change that results in meaningful ocean policy reform." The Joint Initiative was established by the members of two major U.S.-based oceans commissions: the Pew Oceans Commission and the United States Commission on Ocean Policy. It was originally co-chaired by former White House Chief of Staff Leon Panetta and former Chief of Naval Operations Admiral James D. Watkins (United States Navy, Ret.), chairs of the Pew and U.S. Ocean Commissions, respectively. Currently, the Joint Initiative is led by a Leadership Council, which is co-chaired by Christine Todd Whitman, former EPA Administrator under President George W. Bush and former governor of New Jersey, and Norman Y. Mineta, Secretary of Commerce under President Bill Clinton and Secretary of Transportation under President George W. Bush.

The Joint Initiative Leadership Council members include leaders from prominent universities and environmental groups, scientists, national security leaders and representatives from a variety of ocean industries including fisheries, the science and technology, and shipping. The Joint Initiative works with networks of people involved in national, regional, state and local ocean policy issues from all fields, including scientists, industry representatives, advocacy groups and policy makers. The Joint Initiative, its members, and its publications are offered as resources to policy makers at all levels of government interested in pursuing ocean policy reforms consistent with the Commissions' recommendations. The Joint Initiative's most recent publication, an interactive digital report, is entitled Ocean Action Agenda: Supporting Regional Ocean Economies and Ecosystems.

== Background and history ==
=== The Ocean Commissions ===
Pursuant to the Oceans Act of 2000, President George W. Bush established the U.S. Commission on Ocean Policy, chaired by Admiral James D. Watkins. The 16-member commission presented recommendations for a new and comprehensive national ocean policy. Their final report, An Ocean Blueprint for the 21st Century, was released in 2004.

Concurrently, the Pew Charitable Trusts established the Pew Oceans Commission, led by Leon Panetta. The 18-member group presented its recommendations on ocean policy reform in their 2003 report, America's Living Oceans: Charting a Course for Sea Change.

=== The Joint Ocean Commission Initiative: 2005-2010 ===
The reports of the US Commission on Ocean Policy and the Pew Oceans Commission contained strikingly similar recommendations. To further their overlapping and complementary recommendations and to unify their efforts, the members of the two Commissions came together in 2005 as the Joint Ocean Commission Initiative. It was originally co-chaired by former White House Chief of Staff Leon Panetta and former chief of naval operations Admiral James D. Watkins (United States Navy, Ret.), chairs of the Pew and U.S. Ocean Commissions, respectively. Meridian Institute has served as the secretariat of the Joint Ocean Commission Initiative throughout its existence.

From 2005 to 2010, the Joint Initiative Commissioners continually provided assistance to policymakers at all levels of government — local, state, and federal — as well as to leaders in the nongovernmental, academic, and private sectors. The commissioners were dedicated to moving the U.S. toward a better coordinated national ocean policy, with an improved governance framework and enhanced management tools to carry out that policy. The Joint Ocean Commission Initiative focused its efforts in seven priority areas: national ocean policy reform; regional and state ocean leadership; international ocean leadership; ocean science, research, and education; fisheries management reform; new funding; and oceans and climate change.

To advance these priorities, members of the Joint Initiative were regularly called on as experts to advise Congress and other political leaders and appeared as key witnesses at numerous hearings on ocean policy. The Joint Initiative also served as a resource for expertise on ocean issues to the media and other ocean groups. Joint Initiative leaders authored or were cited in numerous articles and stories about its work have appeared in major national newspapers and media markets around the country. Commissioners aided the Joint Initiative through their independent work concerning ocean and coastal issues and through maintaining a high profile in the ocean community.

=== The Joint Ocean Commission Initiative: 2010 - Present ===
In June 2010, the Joint Ocean Commission Initiative announced new leadership that would focus specifically on promoting the establishment and effective implementation of a comprehensive U.S. national ocean policy. Former EPA Administrator (1970–1973, 1983–1985) William Ruckelshaus and former Secretary of Transportation (2001–2006) and Secretary of Commerce (2000–2001) Norman Mineta became the new co-chairs of the Joint Initiative Leadership Council.

On July 19, 2010, President Barack Obama signed Executive Order 13547 establishing a National Policy for the Stewardship of the Ocean, Our Coasts, and the Great Lakes. The Executive Order directed federal agencies to adopt and implement the Final Recommendations of the White House Interagency Ocean Policy Task Force, a body established by President Obama in June 2009 to make recommendations about U.S. ocean policy. The Task Force recommendations called for the establishment of a national ocean policy with a strong federal coordinating structure and an effective framework for implementation based on coastal and marine spatial planning, all to be overseen by an Interagency National Ocean Council. The new national ocean policy represented the realization of one of the key recommendations urged by the US Commission on Ocean Policy and the Pew Oceans Commission and championed by the Joint Ocean Commission Initiative.

To translate the National Ocean Policy into on-the-ground actions, the National Ocean Council released the National Ocean Policy Implementation Plan in April 2013. The Implementation Plan, which incorporates input from a range of stakeholders, including industry, conservation, and science perspectives, describes specific actions federal agencies will take to address ocean-related challenges, gives states and regions greater input into federal decisions, streamlines federal operations, and promotes economic growth.

Since 2010, the Joint Initiative has worked to ensure that the National Ocean Policy adequately protects, maintains, and restores the environmental and economic health of America's oceans, coasts, and Great Lakes. During this time, the Joint Initiative developed the Report Charting the Course: Securing the Future of America's Oceans, which provides four major recommendations on ocean policy. The Joint Initiative views these recommendations as an integral part of reforming ocean and coastal policy, improving ocean health, and bolstering the ocean economy for all citizens of the United States. All four of the policy priorities are incorporated in the work of the Leadership Council to promote effective and comprehensive national ocean policy.

In 2014, the Joint Initiative launched a regional outreach strategy to inform the development of its latest report, the Ocean Action Agenda. This was done through a series of Regional Ocean Leadership Roundtables, convened on the East, West, and Gulf Coasts and in the U.S. Arctic. At these roundtables, the Joint Initiative heard from nonprofit, industry, and military leaders, as well as representatives from federal, state, local, and tribal entities, about regional priorities, challenges, and needs. Each Roundtable provided unique insights about important regional ocean and coastal priorities and needs, but they all underscored the importance of dedicated funding for ocean priorities, international cooperation and U.S. leadership on ocean issues, ocean science and research, infrastructure investments, and support for local, state, and regional efforts. The input gathered at these roundtables informed the development of the Ocean Action Agenda, which contains recommendations for the Trump Administration and 115th Congress.

=== The Joint Ocean Commission Initiative Leadership Council ===
The bipartisan Joint Initiative Leadership Council is co-chaired by Christine Todd Whitman and Norman Mineta. Members of the Joint Initiative Leadership Council include:

Co-chairs

- Christine Todd Whitman – founder and president, The Whitman Strategy Group; former Administrator, U.S. Environmental Protection Agency (2001–2003); former governor, State of New Jersey (1994–2001)
- Norman Mineta – president and CEO, Mineta & Associates, LLC; former Secretary of Transportation (2001–2006) and Secretary of Commerce (2000–2001); Member of Congress (1975–1995)

Members

- Frances Beinecke – Senior fellow and former president, Natural Resources Defense Council
- Donald Boesch – professor of marine science and president, University of Maryland Center for Environmental Science
- Lillian Borrone – former assistant executive director, Port Authority of New York and New Jersey; member, U.S. Commission on Ocean Policy
- Norm Dicks – senior policy advisor, Van Ness Feldman; former member of Congress (1977–2013)
- Quenton Dokken – president and chief executive officer, Gulf of Mexico Foundation, Inc.
- Vice Admiral Paul Gaffney II, U.S. Navy (Ret.) – president emeritus, Monmouth University; member, U.S. Commission on Ocean Policy
- Robert Gagosian – president emeritus, Consortium for Ocean Leadership
- Sherri Goodman – Public Policy Fellow, Woodrow Wilson International Center for Scholars
- Scott Gudes – vice president of government affairs, American Sportfishing Association; former Deputy Under Secretary of Commerce for Oceans and Atmosphere (1998–2003)
- Vice Admiral Conrad Lautenbacher – chief executive officer and director, GeoOptics, Inc.; former Under Secretary of Commerce for Oceans and Atmosphere and NOAA Administrator (2001–2008)
- Margaret Leinen – director, Scripps Institution of Oceanography; vice chancellor for marine sciences and sean, School of Marine Sciences, University of California, San Diego; U.S. Science Envoy for the Ocean
- Jane Lubchenco – distinguished university professor and advisor in Marine Studies, Oregon State University; former U.S. Science Envoy for the Ocean; former Under Secretary of Commerce for Oceans and Atmosphere and NOAA Administrator (2009–2013); member, Pew Oceans Commission
- Julie Packard – executive director, Monterey Bay Aquarium; member, Pew Oceans Commission
- Leon Panetta – co-founder, The Panetta Institute for Public Policy; former secretary, U.S. Department of Defense (2011–2013); former director of U.S. Central Intelligence Agency (2009–2011); former White House Chief of Staff (1994–1997); chair, Pew Oceans Commission
- John Pappalardo – chief executive officer, Cape Cod Commercial Fishermen's Alliance; former chair, New England Fishery Management Council (2006–2011)
- Pietro Parravano – president, Institute for Fisheries Resources; member, Pew Oceans Commission
- Randy Repass – founder and former chairman of the board, West Marine, Inc.
- Andrew Rosenberg – director of the Center for Science and Democracy, Union of Concerned Scientists; member, U.S. Commission on Ocean Policy
- William Ruckelshaus – strategic director, Madrona Venture Group; former Administrator, U.S. Environmental Protection Agency (1970–1973, 1983–1985); member, U.S. Commission on Ocean Policy
- Paul Sandifer – research associate and director, Center for Coastal Environmental and Human Health, College of Charleston; former senior science advisor to the NOAA Administrator; member, U.S. Commission on Ocean Policy

== Reports and publications ==
=== Ocean Action Agenda: Supporting Regional Ocean Economies and Ecosystems ===
In March 2017, The Joint Initiative released an interactive digital report, the Ocean Action Agenda: Supporting Regional Ocean Economies and Ecosystems. The report contains recommendations for the Trump Administration and Congress to ensure the health and productivity of America's oceans, coasts, and Great Lakes and foster economic growth.

The report contains 29 recommendation organized into nine priority action areas:

- Promote healthy and safe ocean, coastal, and Great Lakes communities and economies
  - Make infrastructure investments that protect coastal communities
  - Provide support for states and coastal communities to upgrade critical coastal infrastructure
  - Significantly increase investments in port infrastructure
  - Boost funding and support for cost-effective restoration and protection of critical coastal features
  - Restore critical ecosystems in the Gulf of Mexico
  - Provide states and coastal communities with tools and information about risks
- Promote and support regional ocean collaboration
  - Direct federal agencies to strongly support and closely coordinate with regional initiatives
- Sustain leadership on international ocean issues
  - Continue to demonstrate strong leadership by highlighting ocean issues in international forums
  - Provide advice and consent to the Convention on the Law of the Sea
- Close critical gaps in ocean science to spur economic growth
  - Make substantial investments in ocean science infrastructure, research, monitoring, observation, and exploration programs
  - Improve the collection, management, use, and accessibility of environmental and socioeconomic data to support public and private sector decision making
  - Provide increased support for ocean education programs
- Demonstrate leadership in the Arctic
  - Invest in sustainable economic development to support Arctic communities
  - Engage tribes and native communities and include indigenous knowledge in policy development
  - Invest in critically needed environmentally sound infrastructure in the Arctic
  - Implement a coordinated scientific research program in the Arctic with diverse partners
  - Increase funding for federal agencies operating in the region, including the U.S. Coast Guard, NOAA, the National Science Foundation, and the U.S. Department of Defense
  - Engage in multilateral efforts to address Arctic challenges and enhance international cooperation in the region
- Sustain a healthy economy by supporting healthy ecosystems
  - Invest in ocean acidification and hypoxia science and research and support multi-sectoral collaborative efforts to address the problem
  - Continue progress in protecting ecologically and culturally significant ocean and coastal areas to improve fish stocks, food security, and resilience
  - Use existing authority to fund and implement measures to improve water quality
- Promote sustainable fisheries that support healthy ecosystems and coastal economies
  - Maintain the U.S. government commitment to healthy and sustainable fisheries by effectively implementing the primary law governing U.S. fisheries
  - Improve fisheries data collection and management by the National Marine Fisheries Service (NMFS)
  - Prioritize combatting illegal fishing and improving seafood traceability
  - Support the sustainable growth of the offshore aquaculture industry
- Encourage sustainable approaches to offshore energy development
  - Stimulate the production of offshore renewable energy through technology development, deployment, and regulatory consistency
  - Implement the recommendations of the National Commission on the BP Deepwater Horizon Oil Spill and Offshore Drilling
  - Encourage responsible collaboration between federal regulators and the oil and gas industry, specifically around information and data sharing
- Provide consistent financial support for ocean and coastal priorities
  - Capitalize a dedicated ocean investment fund to support sustained ocean research, management, and innovation.

The Joint Initiative's recommendations were informed by input gathered at Regional Ocean Leadership Roundtables convened in the U.S. Arctic and East, West, and Gulf Coasts. At these roundtables, the Joint Initiative brought together more than 250 local, state, tribal, and national leaders representing diverse industry, government, and nonprofit interests to identify creative solutions to critical ocean and coastal issues. Input from these roundtables is also reflected in the Ocean Action Agenda's suite of narrative stories, which highlight the importance of the oceans and Great Lakes to the lives of all Americans.

=== Charting the Course: Securing the Future of America's Oceans ===
In June 2013, the Joint Ocean Commission Initiative released Charting the Course: Securing the Future of America's Oceans. The report recommends actions for the Administration and Congress that prioritize areas where short-term progress can be readily achieved. If implemented, these measures will strengthen ocean-dependent economies, protect coastal communities and provide new opportunities for growth in thriving oceans. The report highlights four major recommendations and provides details on how to implement them:

1. Enhance the resiliency of coastal communities and ocean ecosystems to dramatic changes underway in our oceans and on our coasts

- The Administration and Congress should boost funding and support for programs that protect and restore critical coastal infrastructure.
- The Administration and Congress should provide support for states and communities to upgrade critical coastal infrastructure, including wastewater and transportation systems.
- The Administration and Congress should provide increased funding and support for ocean science infrastructure and research programs needed to understand the relationship between the oceans and climate and improve our forecasting capabilities.
- The Administration and Congress should take actions to measure and assess the threat of ocean acidification and develop mechanisms to address the problem.

2. Promote ocean renewable energy development and reinvest in our oceans

- The Administration and Congress should accelerate ocean renewable energy development by providing financial and tax incentives and a fair regulatory structure.
- Congress should establish a dedicated ocean investment fund to invest a portion of revenues from offshore commercial energy activities to provide support for national, regional, state, and local programs working to manage ocean and coastal resources.

3. Support state and regional ocean and coastal priorities

- The Administration and Congress should support multi-state regional ocean partnerships that coordinate data and decision making across jurisdictions, make progress on shared priorities, and more effectively engage ocean and coastal stakeholders.

4. Improve Arctic research and management

- Congress and the Administration should implement the National Strategy for the Arctic Region and ensure opportunities for public engagement.
- Congress and the Administration should implement a coordinated scientific research program in the Arctic that is supported by strong ocean observation system and adequate infrastructure – including vessels, polar icebreakers, and fundamental platforms for research.
- The Administration and Congress should increase funding for federal agencies operating in the region, particularly the United States Coast Guard and the National Oceanic and Atmospheric Administration (NOAA).
- The U.S. Senate should consent to accede to the United Nations Convention on the Law of the Sea.

=== Changing Oceans Changing World ===
In April 2009, the Joint Ocean Commission Initiative released an urgent set of recommendations, Changing Oceans, Changing World: Ocean Priorities for the Administration and Congress. The recommendations incorporated input from leaders at some of the most respected and influential ocean and coastal policy and science organizations in the country. The Joint Initiative identified specific actions the Obama Administration and Congress should take within two to four years to improve ocean and coastal policy, management, science and funding, emphasizing their contributions toward addressing pressing national challenges of climate change, energy security and reviving the economy. The report identified the following policy priorities and specific actions for the president and Congress to take:

1. Improving Ocean and Coastal Policy and Management

- The Administration and Congress should establish a national ocean policy.
- Congress should codify and strengthen the National Oceanic and Atmospheric Administration (NOAA) to enhance its mission, improve its structure.
- The Administration and Congress should support regional, ecosystem-based approaches to the management of ocean, coastal, and Great Lakes
- Congress should strengthen and reauthorize the Coastal Zone Management Act.
- Congress should strengthen the Clean Water Act.
- The Administration should support expedited implementation of the Magnuson-Stevens Fishery Conservation and Management Act, with Congress ensuring that NOAA has the necessary funding to implement the Act.
- The Administration and Congress should actively encourage the use of innovative, science-based approaches that take into account important ecosystem dynamics that affect the health of our nation's marine ecosystems as a whole and, in particular, its fisheries.

2. Bolstering International Leadership

- The United States Senate should provide its advice and consent to U.S. accession to the United Nations Convention on the Law of the Sea by the end of 2009.
- The Administration should work to ensure that the Arctic Ocean is managed in a comprehensive, integrated, and science-based manner.
- The Administration should implement a strong scientific research program in the Arctic.
- The Administration should fully implement the illegal, unregulated, and unreported (IUU) fishing provisions of the Magnuson-Stevens Act
- The Administration and Congress should support ongoing U.S. efforts in the World Trade Organization negotiations calling for an end to fishing subsidies that promote overcapitalization and global depletion of fish stocks.

3. Strengthening Ocean Science

- The Administration should strengthen and Congress should codify, where appropriate, the federal ocean science governance regime.
- The Administration and Congress should enhance the integration of ocean and coastal science into the broader climate initiative.
- The Administration and Congress should secure the availability of ocean-related information, products, and services critical to the operations of key sectors of the U.S. economy.
- The Committee on Ocean Policy and the Office of Science and Technology Policy should take the lead in developing a comprehensive strategy to guide marine-related, ecosystem-focused research, assessment, and management.
- The Administration should initiate an effort among governmental, academic, and private stakeholders engaged in ocean science to prioritize competing demands within the ocean and coastal science community.

4. Funding Ocean and Coastal Policies and Programs

- The Administration and Congress should establish an Ocean Investment Fund, using resource rents generated by private commercial activities in federal waters on the Outer Continental Shelf.
- A portion of any funds generated by the sale of carbon credits pursuant to a cap and trade or tax system should be dedicated to protecting, maintaining, and restoring ocean and coastal ecosystems, as well as promoting greater scientific understanding of the relationship between the oceans and climate change.
- The Administration should develop an integrated federal coastal and ocean budget.

=== One Coast One Future ===
In January 2009, the Joint Ocean Commission Initiative released its much anticipated report, One Coast, One Future: Securing the Health of West Coast Ecosystems and Economies. The report, requested by 19 elected officials from California, Oregon and Washington State, offers guidance to local, state and federal leaders on how to improve the health of coastal ecosystems and the economies that depend on them through integrated decision making. One Coast, One Future offers specific and immediate ways that local and state West Coast leaders can collaborate to implement a coordinated and more productive approach to managing the coast, as well as ways state legislatures and the federal government can support their efforts. The report urges these leaders to adapt and prepare for climate change impacts through an ecosystem-based approach that recognizes the interconnections among marine life, climate, local economies and the quality of human life. The report also acknowledges that many local West Coast communities currently face alternative energy proposals, and suggests ways that they can work with other communities, government agencies and developers to implement effective solutions to these pressing energy challenges. Recommendations in the report include the following:

- Identify a coordination area and engage stakeholders in setting goals.
- Understand and monitor ecosystem health.
- Establish coordinating mechanisms to bring together all interested parties.
- Make the land-sea connection.
- Collect and integrate locally-relevant information to better inform decision -making.
- Support integrated, ecosystem-based approaches, particularly at the local level.
- Consider marine spatial planning.
- Plan for climate change impacts at all levels of government.
- Maintain or enhance funding for core coastal and ocean programs.
- Send a clear message to Congress and the administration to fund and implement ocean protection measures.
- Creatively consolidate or reallocate existing resources to take full advantage of funding sources.
- Establish public-private partnerships for funding and in-kind resources.

=== From Sea to Shining Sea ===
In June 2006 the Joint Initiative released a national ocean policy action plan for Congress, From Sea to Shining Sea: Priorities for Ocean Policy Reform. The plan was created at the request of ten prominent U.S. Senators to provide a guide for legislative and funding priorities.

The action plan responds to the senators’ request to identify the most urgent priorities for congressional action to implement the two Commissions’ recommendations. The plan outlines ten steps Congress should take to address the most pressing challenges, the highest funding priorities, and the most important changes to federal laws and the budget process to establish a more effective and integrated ocean policy. The report identified the following priorities:

- Adopting a statement of national ocean policy that acknowledges in legislation the importance of oceans to the nation's economic and ecological health and establishes a framework for all other ocean legislation.
- Establishing a strengthened National Oceanic and Atmospheric Administration (NOAA) in law and working with the Bush Administration to improve federal agency coordination on ocean and coastal issues;
- Enacting legislation to create incentives for ecosystem-based management that builds upon existing and emerging regional efforts to involve federal, state, tribal, and local governments, as well as the private sector, nongovernmental organizations, and academic institutions;
- Reauthorizing an improved Magnuson-Stevens Fishery Conservation and Management Act that relies more strongly on science to guide management actions to ensure the long-term sustainability of U.S. fisheries;
- Enacting ocean and coastal bills that have made significant progress through the legislative process in the 109th United States Congress;
- Incorporating ocean-related science and education into the new national innovation and competitiveness initiative, capitalizing on the growing economic potential associated with our oceans and the attraction they hold for students;
- Enacting legislation to authorize and fund the Integrated Ocean Observing System;
- Acceding to the United Nations Convention on the Law of the Sea, allowing the U.S. to share its expertise, capitalize on economic opportunities, and protect is sovereign interests;
- Establishing an Ocean Trust Fund in the U.S. Treasury as a dedicated source of funds for improved management and understanding of ocean and coastal resources by the federal and state governments; and
- Securing additional funding to support management, science, and education programs that are the foundation of robust national ocean policy.

=== U.S. Ocean Policy Report Card ===
The Joint Initiative released a U.S. Ocean Policy Report Card for 2005, 2006, 2007, and 2012 which monitored the nation's collective progress toward fulfilling the recommendations of the two Commissions’ reports and advancing ocean policy reform. The report card assesses progress over the year and provided specific recommendations about how to improve each categorical grade. There were five subjects featured on the 2012 report card: national leadership and support; regional, state, and local leadership and implementation; research, science; and education; funding; and United Nations Convention on the Law of the Sea.

It is a continuing priority of the Joint Initiative Leadership Council to monitor and assess U.S. ocean policy.
