= James D. Watkins =

American politician and admiral (1927-2012)

James Watkins
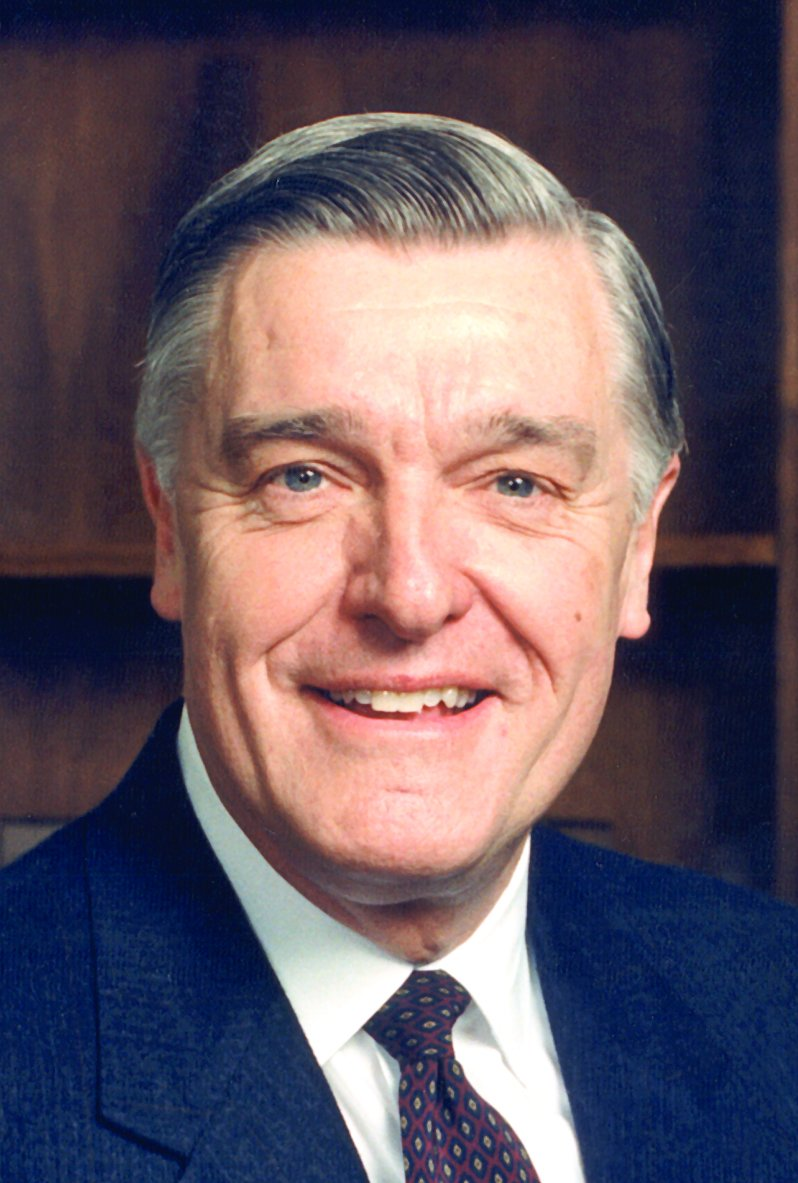
- Watkins as Secretary of Energy

6th United States Secretary of Energy
- In office March 1, 1989 – January 20, 1993
- President: George H. W. Bush
- Preceded by: John Herrington
- Succeeded by: Hazel O'Leary

2nd Chair of the President's Commission on the HIV Epidemic
- In office October 8, 1987 – June 24, 1988
- President: Ronald Reagan
- Preceded by: Eugene Mayberry
- Succeeded by: Position abolished

22nd Chief of Naval Operations
- In office June 30, 1982 – June 30, 1986
- President: Ronald Reagan
- Preceded by: Thomas Hayward
- Succeeded by: Carlisle Trost

Personal details
- Born: James David Watkins; March 7, 1927 Alhambra, California, U.S.
- Died: July 26, 2012 (aged 85) Alexandria, Virginia, U.S.
- Resting place: Arlington National Cemetery
- Party: Republican
- Spouse(s): Sheila Jo McKinney (1950–1996); Janet McDonough
- Children: 6
- Education: United States Naval Academy (BSc); Naval Postgraduate School (MSc)

Military service
- Allegiance: United States
- Branch/service: United States Navy
- Years of service: 1949–1986
- Rank: Admiral
- Commands: Chief of Naval Operations; United States Pacific Fleet; United States Sixth Fleet
- Battles/wars: World War II; Korean War; Vietnam War
- Awards: Defense Distinguished Service Medal (2); Navy Distinguished Service Medal (3); Army Distinguished Service Medal; Air Force Distinguished Service Medal; Legion of Merit (3); Bronze Star Medal ("V" Device); Navy Commendation Medal

James David Watkins (March 7, 1927 – July 26, 2012) was a United States Navy admiral and former Chief of Naval Operations who served as the United States Secretary of Energy during the George H. W. Bush administration, also chairing U.S. government commissions on HIV/AIDS and ocean policy. Watkins also served on the boards of various companies and other nongovernmental organizations and as the co-chair of the Joint Ocean Commission Initiative.

== Early life and education ==
Watkins was born March 7, 1927, in Alhambra, California. His grandfather George Clinton Ward was president of Southern California Edison during the 1930s. His father, Edward Francis Watkins, owned the Southern California Winery Co. His mother, Louise Watkins, unsuccessfully sought the Republican nomination for Senate in 1938; he described his mother as "a woman ahead of her time."

Watkins attended Webb School of California in Claremont, California; he subsequently graduated from the United States Naval Academy in 1949 and received his master's degree in mechanical engineering from the Naval Postgraduate School in 1958.

== Career ==
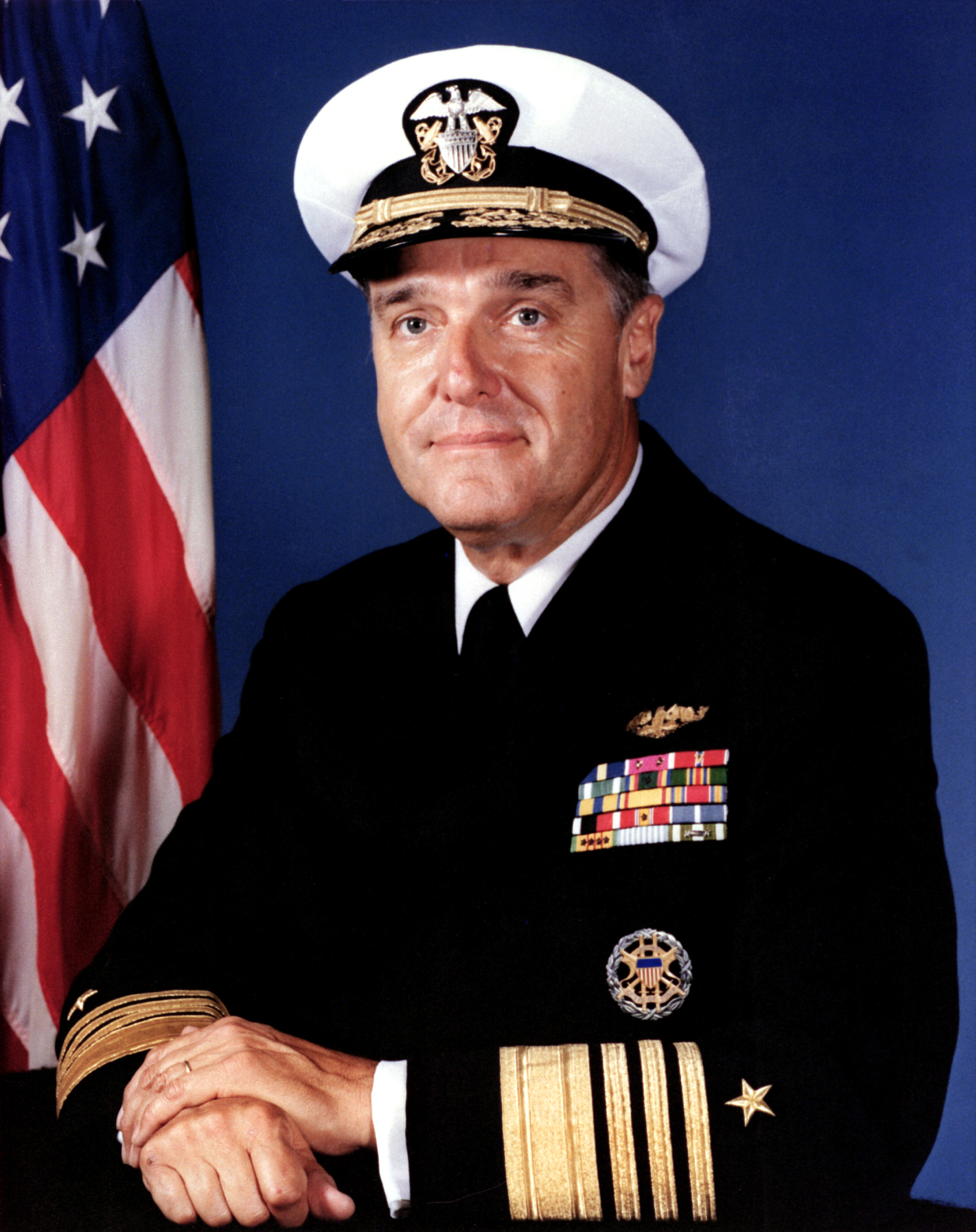
Watkins as Chief of Naval Operations in March 1982

Watkins spent 37 years in the United States Navy, serving on destroyers, cruisers and submarines, and shore assignments in personnel management. He was awarded the Bronze Star Medal with Combat 'V' as a result of combat operations that occurred in May and June 1968, in the Gulf of Tonkin, while serving as executive officer of USS Long Beach. In those operations, the ship participated in events leading to the shoot-down of five North Vietnamese MiG aircraft, two by air intercept with her air controllers (1967), and three by long range surface-to-air missiles (first in US Naval history) (1967 and 1968). The longest kill was at eighty miles.

During his tenure in the Navy, Watkins served as Chief of Naval Operations, Commander of the Sixth Fleet, Vice Chief of Naval Operations, and commander-in-chief of the Pacific Fleet.

Watkins's ties to oceans as a graduate of the Naval Academy, a submariner and former Chief of Naval Operations, contributed to his commitment to ocean policy reform. When the Oceans Act of 2000 was passed, President George W. Bush established the U.S. Commission on Ocean Policy, and appointed Watkins to chair the commission. The 16-member commission presented recommendations for a new and comprehensive national ocean policy. Their final report, "An Ocean Blueprint for the 21st Century", was released in 2004.

Concurrently, the Pew Charitable Trusts established the Pew Oceans Commission, which was led by President Bill Clinton's former Chief of Staff Leon Panetta. The 18-member group presented its own recommendations on ocean policy to Congress and the administration. Their final report, "America's Living Oceans: Charting a Course for Sea Change", was released in 2003.

The two reports listed strikingly similar recommendations. As a result, Congress and the administration began to recognize the importance of ocean policy reform. To further these recommendations, and to act as one unified force, the two commissions came together in 2004 to establish the Joint Ocean Commission Initiative. Watkins co-chaired the Joint Ocean Commission Initiative with Leon Panetta, and was called on as an expert to advise and testify before Congress on ocean governance reform. He was also cited in the media as an expert on ocean issues and penned a number of opinion pieces calling for ocean reform that were published in national outlets.

=== Reagan administration ===
President Ronald Reagan appointed Watkins as chairman of his President’s Commission on the HIV Epidemic. Watkins surprised many AIDS-awareness advocates when his conservative panel unexpectedly recommended supporting antibias laws to protect HIV-positive people, on-demand treatment for drug addicts, and the speeding of AIDS-related research.

=== George H. W. Bush administration ===
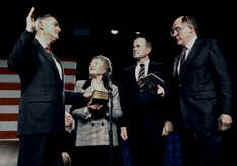
Watkins is sworn in as Energy Secretary. From left to right: James D. Watkins, Sheila Watkins, President George H. W. Bush, Chief Justice William H. Rehnquist.

On March 9, 1989, Watkins was sworn in as Secretary of Energy by President George H. W. Bush. He remained as Energy Secretary until 1993.

On June 27, 1989, Watkins announced the Ten-Point Plan to strengthen environmental protection and waste management activities at the United States Department of Energy's production, research, and testing facilities. In September 1989, he established the Modernization Review Committee to review the assumptions and recommendations of the 2010 Report. On November 9, 1989, Watkins established the Office of Environmental Restoration and Waste Management within the Department of Energy. On August 15, 1990, Secretary Watkins announced plans to increase oil production and decrease consumption to counter Iraqi-Kuwaiti oil losses caused by the Iraqi Invasion of Kuwait. On March 4, 1991, he transmitted the administration's energy bill to the House and Senate. On May 10, 1992, in testimony before the Senate Armed Services Committee he reported that, for the first time since 1945, the United States was not building any nuclear weapons.

=== George W. Bush administration ===
Watkins was appointed to what would be the second presidential commission to be known as the "Watkins Commission" when named Chairman of the United States Commission on Ocean Policy in 2001.

== Personal life ==
Watkins married Sheila Jo McKinney in 1950. They had six children: Katherine Marie Watkins Coopersmith, RNCS; Laura Jo Watkins Kauffmann; Charles Lancaster Watkins; Susan Elizabeth Watkins, Reverend Monsignor James David Watkins, Ph.D., Catholic priest and pastor of Saint Ann Roman Catholic Church in northwest Washington, D.C., and Edward Francis Watkins, Ph.D.

== Death ==
Watkins died of congestive heart failure on July 26, 2012, at the age of 85. He was interred at Arlington National Cemetery.

== Awards and decorations ==
=== U.S. military awards and decorations ===
Officer Submarine Warfare insignia
Office of the Joint Chiefs of Staff Identification Badge

Defense Distinguished Service Medal with one bronze oak leaf cluster
Navy Distinguished Service Medal with two gold award stars
Army Distinguished Service Medal
Air Force Distinguished Service Medal
Legion of Merit with two award stars
Bronze Star Medal with Valor device
Navy Commendation Medal
Navy Unit Commendation with one bronze service star
Navy Meritorious Unit Commendation
Navy Expeditionary Medal
China Service Medal
World War II Victory Medal
Navy Occupation Service Medal
National Defense Service Medal with one bronze service star
Korean Service Medal
Vietnam Service Medal with four bronze service stars

=== U.S. civilian awards ===
Presidential Citizens Medal
Navy Distinguished Public Service Award

=== Foreign awards ===
Order of National Security Merit, Tong-Il Medal (Republic of Korea)
Order of the Rising Sun (Japan)
Order of Naval Merit, Grand Officer (Brazil)
Korean Presidential Unit Citation (Republic of Korea)
United Nations Korea Medal
Vietnam Campaign Medal (Republic of Vietnam)

Watkins also received decorations from Italy, France, Spain, Pakistan, and Sweden.

In March 2001, Watkins was given the title of President Emeritus of the Consortium for Ocean Research and Education (CORE), and was awarded the Navy's Distinguished Public Award by the Secretary of the Navy. On April 21, 2005, the Naval Postgraduate Mechanical Engineering Building was renamed Watkins Hall, after Watkins. He was also a member of the Naval Postgraduate School (NPS) Hall of Fame.

In June 1983, Watkins was inducted as a Knight of Malta. In 1991 he was awarded the AAES Chairs' Award from the American Association of Engineering Societies.

== Leadership roles ==
Watkins' positions within the United States government include:

- Chief of Naval Operations during part of the Reagan administration (1982–1986)
- Chairman of the Watkins Commission on AIDS (1987–1988)
- Secretary of Energy (1989–1993)
- Chairman of the United States Commission on Ocean Policy (also known as the Watkins Commission) (2001–2004)

He has also served several non-governmental roles:

- Co-chair of the Joint Ocean Commission Initiative (JOCI) (2004–)
- A Director of the Joint Oceanographic Institutions, Inc. (1993–2000)
- A Director of GTS Duratek since April 1997
- A Director of Southern California Edison Co.
- A Director of International Technology Corp.
- A Director of Philadelphia Electric Co.
- A Director of VESTAR Inc.
- Trustee, Carnegie Corporation of New York (1993–1998)
- President of the Consortium for Oceanographic Research and Education (1994 – March 2001)
- Member, Naval Academy Endowment Trust Board of Directors
- Life Member, USNA Alumni Association
- Member of the Board of Directors of the U.S. Naval Academy Foundation

Military offices
Preceded by Thomas Hayward	Chief of Naval Operations; 1982–1986	Succeeded by Carlisle Trost
Preceded by Robert L. J. Long	Vice Chief of Naval Operations; 1979–1981	Succeeded by William N. Small
Political offices
Preceded by John Herrington	United States Secretary of Energy; 1989–1993	Succeeded by Hazel O'Leary
