= Watkins Commission =

Watkins Commission may refer to:

- the U.S. President's Commission on the HIV Epidemic, formed in 1987
- the United States Commission on Ocean Policy, formed in 2000
