= Leon Panetta =

American politician and government official (born 1938)

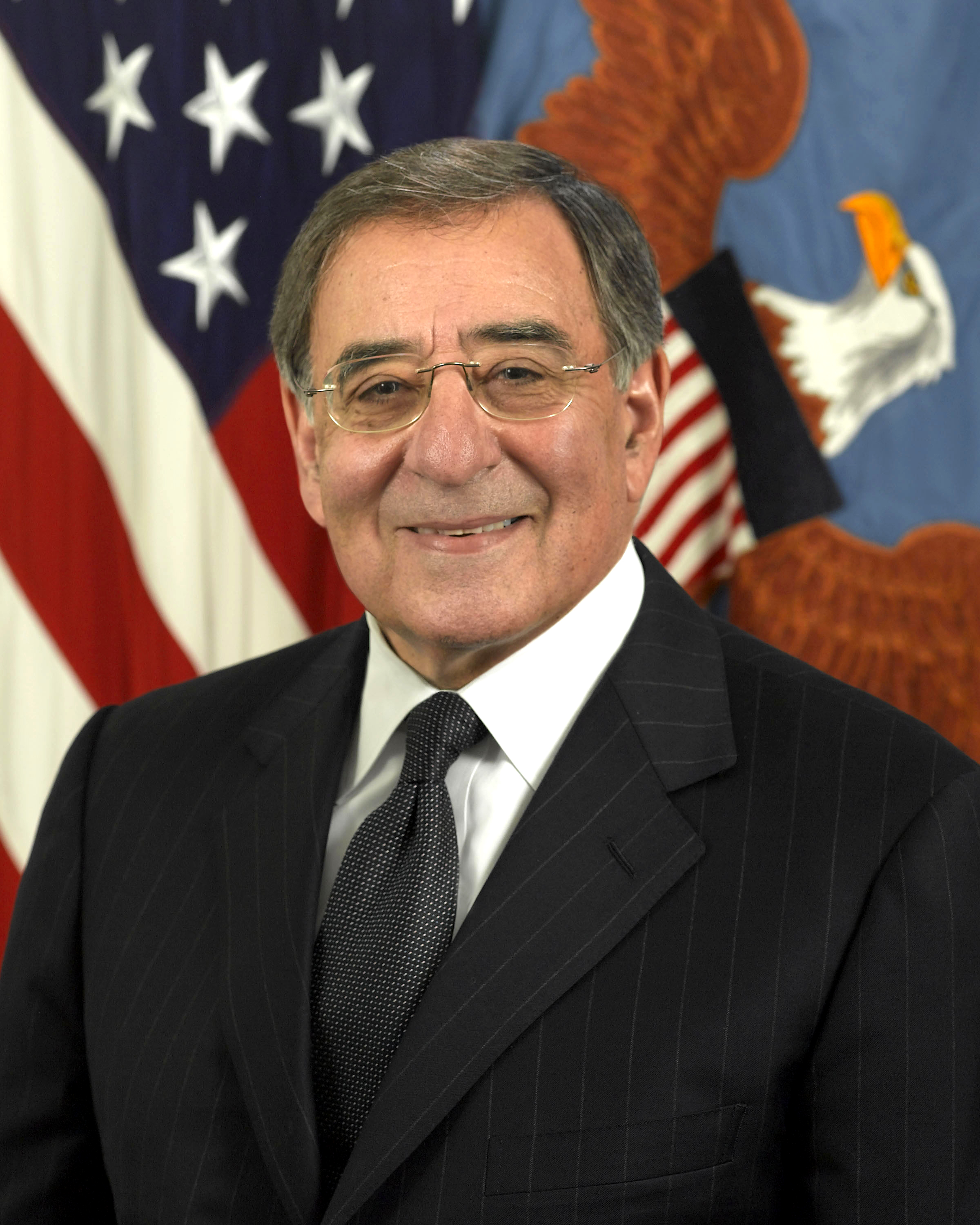
- Official portrait, 2011

23rd United States Secretary of Defense
- In office July 1, 2011 – February 26, 2013
- President: Barack Obama
- Deputy: William J. Lynn III; Ash Carter
- Preceded by: Robert Gates
- Succeeded by: Chuck Hagel

3rd Director of the Central Intelligence Agency
- In office February 13, 2009 – June 30, 2011
- President: Barack Obama
- Deputy: Stephen Kappes; Michael Morell
- Preceded by: Michael Hayden
- Succeeded by: Michael Morell (acting)

18th White House Chief of Staff
- In office July 17, 1994 – January 20, 1997
- President: Bill Clinton
- Preceded by: Mack McLarty
- Succeeded by: Erskine Bowles

29th Director of the Office of Management and Budget
- In office January 21, 1993 – July 17, 1994
- President: Bill Clinton
- Preceded by: Richard Darman
- Succeeded by: Alice Rivlin

Chair of the House Budget Committee
- In office January 3, 1989 – January 21, 1993
- Preceded by: Bill Gray
- Succeeded by: Martin Olav Sabo

Member of the U.S. House of Representatives from California
- In office January 3, 1977 – January 21, 1993
- Preceded by: Burt Talcott
- Succeeded by: Sam Farr
- Constituency: 16th district (1977–1993); 17th district (1993)

Personal details
- Born: Leon Edward Panetta; June 28, 1938 (age 88) Monterey, California, U.S.
- Party: Republican (before 1971); Democratic (1971–present)
- Spouse: Sylvia Varni
- Children: 3, including Jimmy
- Education: Santa Clara University (BA, JD)

Military service
- Allegiance: United States
- Branch/service: United States Army
- Years of service: 1964–1966
- Rank: First Lieutenant
- Awards: Army Commendation Medal
- Panetta's voice Panetta testifying on collaboration between the Department of Defense and Department of Veterans Affairs; Recorded July 25, 2012

Leon Edward Panetta (born June 28, 1938) is an American retired politician and government official who served under several Democratic administrations as Secretary of Defense (2011–2013), Director of the Central Intelligence Agency (2009–2011), White House Chief of Staff (1994–1997), director of the Office of Management and Budget (1993–1994), as well as a U.S. representative from California (1977–1993).

Panetta was a member of the United States House of Representatives from 1977 to 1993. He served under President Bill Clinton as Director of the Office of Management and Budget from 1993 to 1994 and as White House Chief of Staff from 1994 to 1997. He cofounded the Panetta Institute for Public Policy in 1997 and served as a distinguished scholar to chancellor Charles B. Reed of the California State University system and as a professor of public policy at Santa Clara University.

In January 2009, newly elected president Barack Obama nominated Panetta to be director of the Central Intelligence Agency. Panetta was confirmed by the Senate in February 2009. As director of the CIA, Panetta oversaw the operation that killed Osama bin Laden. On April 28, 2011, Obama announced the nomination of Panetta as defense secretary to replace the retiring Robert Gates. In June, the Senate confirmed Panetta unanimously and he assumed the office on July 1, 2011. David Petraeus became CIA director on September 6, 2011.

Since retiring as Defense Secretary in 2013, Panetta has served as chairman of the Panetta Institute for Public Policy, located at California State University, Monterey Bay, a campus of the California State University that he helped establish during his tenure as congressman. The institute is dedicated to motivating and preparing people for lives of public service and helping them to become more knowledgeably engaged in the democratic process. He also serves on a number of boards and commissions and frequently writes and lectures on public-policy issues.

Panetta's son, Jimmy, has held his father's former seat in the U.S. House of Representatives since 2017.

== Early life, education, and military service ==
Panetta was born in Monterey, California, the son of Carmelina Maria (Prochilo) and Carmelo Frank Panetta, Italian immigrants from Gerace in Calabria, Italy. In the 1940s, the Panetta family owned a restaurant in Monterey.

He was raised in the Monterey area and attended two Catholic grammar schools: San Carlos School (Monterey) and Junípero Serra School (Carmel). He attended Monterey High School, where he became involved in student politics, and was a member of the Junior Statesmen of America. As a junior, he was the vice president of the student body, and as a senior, he became its president. In 1956, he entered Santa Clara University and graduated magna cum laude in 1960 with a BA in political science. In 1963, he received a Juris Doctor from the Santa Clara University School of Law.

In 1964, he joined the United States Army as a second lieutenant, served as an officer in the Army Military Intelligence Corps, and received the Army Commendation Medal. In 1966, he was discharged as a first lieutenant.

== Political career ==
=== Early political career ===
Panetta started in politics in 1966 as a legislative assistant to Republican senator Thomas Kuchel, the Senate Minority whip from California, whom Panetta has called "a tremendous role model."

In 1969, Panetta became the assistant to Robert H. Finch, secretary of the United States Department of Health, Education, and Welfare under the Nixon administration. Soon thereafter, he was appointed director of the Office for Civil Rights.

Panetta chose to enforce civil rights and equal-education laws over the objection of Richard Nixon, who wanted enforcement to move slowly in keeping with his strategy to gain political support among Southern whites. Robert Finch and assistant secretary John Veneman supported Panetta and refused to fire him, threatening to resign if forced to do so. Eventually forced from office in 1970, Panetta left Washington to work as an executive assistant for John Lindsay, the mayor of New York City. Panetta wrote about his Nixon administration experience in his 1971 book Bring Us Together.

He returned to Monterey to practice law at Panetta, Thompson & Panetta from 1971 to 1976.

=== U.S. House of Representatives ===
==== Elections ====
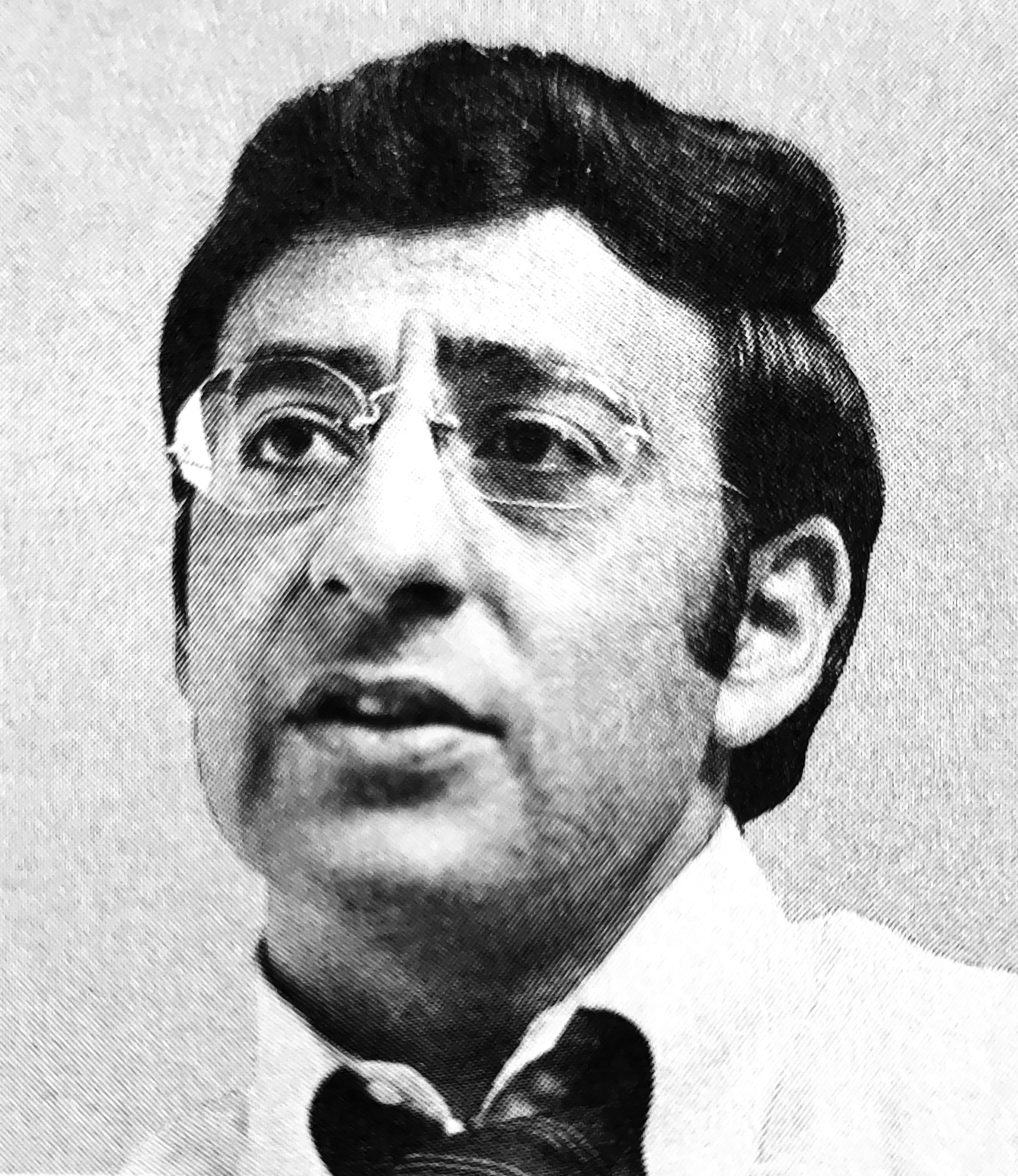
1977 congressional portrait of Panetta

Panetta switched to the Democratic Party in 1971, citing his belief that the Republican Party was moving away from the political center. In 1976, Panetta was elected to the U.S. Congress to represent California's 16th congressional district, unseating incumbent Republican Burt Talcott with 53% of the vote. He would never face another contest nearly that close, and was reelected eight times.

==== Tenure ====
During his time in Congress, Panetta concentrated mostly on budget issues, civil rights, education, healthcare, agriculture, immigration, and environmental protection, particularly preventing oil drilling off the California coast. He wrote the Hunger Prevention Act (Public Law 100–435) of 1988 and the Fair Employment Practices Resolution. He was the author of legislation establishing the Monterey Bay National Marine Sanctuary, and legislation providing Medicare coverage for hospice care. Working with chancellor Barry Munitz, he helped establish California State University, Monterey Bay at the former Fort Ord military base.

He also attempted to form the Big Sur National Scenic Area with senator Alan Cranston. The bill would have created a 700,000-acre (280,000-ha) scenic area administered by the U.S. Forest Service. It budgeted $100 million to buy land from private land owners, up to $30 million for easements and management programs, and created a state plan for a zone about 75 miles (121 km) long and 5 miles (8.0 km) wide along the Big Sur coast.

The bill was opposed by California senator S. I. Hayakawa, development interests, and Big Sur residents. Local residents mocked the plan as "Panetta's Pave 'n' Save" and raised a fund of more than $100,000 to lobby against the proposal. The legislation was blocked by Hayakawa in the energy committee and did not reach a vote.

==== Budget committee ====
Panetta was a member of the House Committee on the Budget from 1979 to 1989, and its chairman from 1989 to 1993, Panetta played a key role in the 1990 budget summit.

==== Committee assignments ====
His positions included:

- Chairman of the U.S. House Committee on the Budget
- Chairman of the Agriculture Committee's Subcommittee on Domestic Marketing, Consumer Relations, and Nutrition
- Chairman of the Administration Committee's Subcommittee on Personnel and Police
- Chairman of the Task Force on Domestic Hunger created by the U.S. House Select Committee on Hunger
- Vice Chairman of the Caucus of Vietnam-Era Veterans in Congress
- Member of the President's Commission on Foreign Language and International Studies.

=== Director of the Office of Management and Budget ===
Though elected to a ninth term in 1992, Panetta left the House in early 1993 after president-elect Bill Clinton selected him to serve as director of the United States Office of Management and Budget. In that role, he developed the budget package that would eventually result in the balanced budget of 1998.

=== White House chief of staff ===
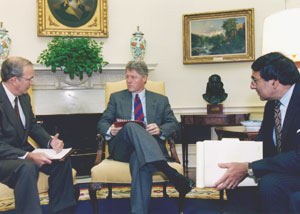
Panetta with President Bill Clinton and Anthony Lake in October 1994

In 1994, President Clinton became increasingly concerned about a lack of order and focus in the White House, an issue that stretched from foreign to domestic policy and political matters. Clinton, who had vowed to run a professional operation, asked Panetta to become his new chief of staff, replacing Mack McLarty. According to author Nigel Hamilton, "Panetta replaced McLarty for the rest of Clinton's first term—and the rest is history. To be a great leader, a modern president must have a great chief of staff—and in Leon Panetta, Clinton got the enforcer he deserved." Panetta was appointed White House chief of staff on July 17, 1994, and he held that position until January 20, 1997. He was a key negotiator of the 1996 budget, which was another important step toward bringing the budget into balance.

=== Director of the CIA ===
==== Nomination ====
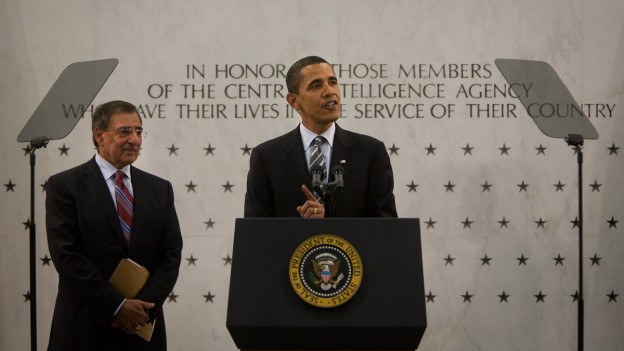
President Barack Obama speaks to CIA employees at CIA Headquarters in Langley, April 20, 2009.

On January 5, 2009, President-elect Barack Obama announced his intention to nominate Panetta to be director of the Central Intelligence Agency.

At the time of his selection, journalists and politicians raised concerns about Panetta's limited experience in intelligence, aside from his two-year service as a military intelligence officer in the 1960s. California Democratic Senator Dianne Feinstein, the chairman of the Senate Select Committee on Intelligence, expressed concerns that she was not consulted about the Panetta appointment and stated her belief that "the agency is best-served by having an intelligence professional in charge at this time."

Former CIA officer Ishmael Jones stated that Panetta was a wise choice, because of his close personal connection to the president and lack of exposure to the CIA bureaucracy. Also, Washington Post columnist David Ignatius said that Panetta did have exposure to intelligence operations as director of the OMB and as chief of staff for President Bill Clinton, where he "sat in on the daily intelligence briefings as chief of staff, and he reviewed the nation's most secret intelligence-collection and covert-action programs in his previous post as director of the Office of Management and Budget".

On February 12, 2009, Panetta was confirmed in the full Senate by voice vote.

==== Tenure ====
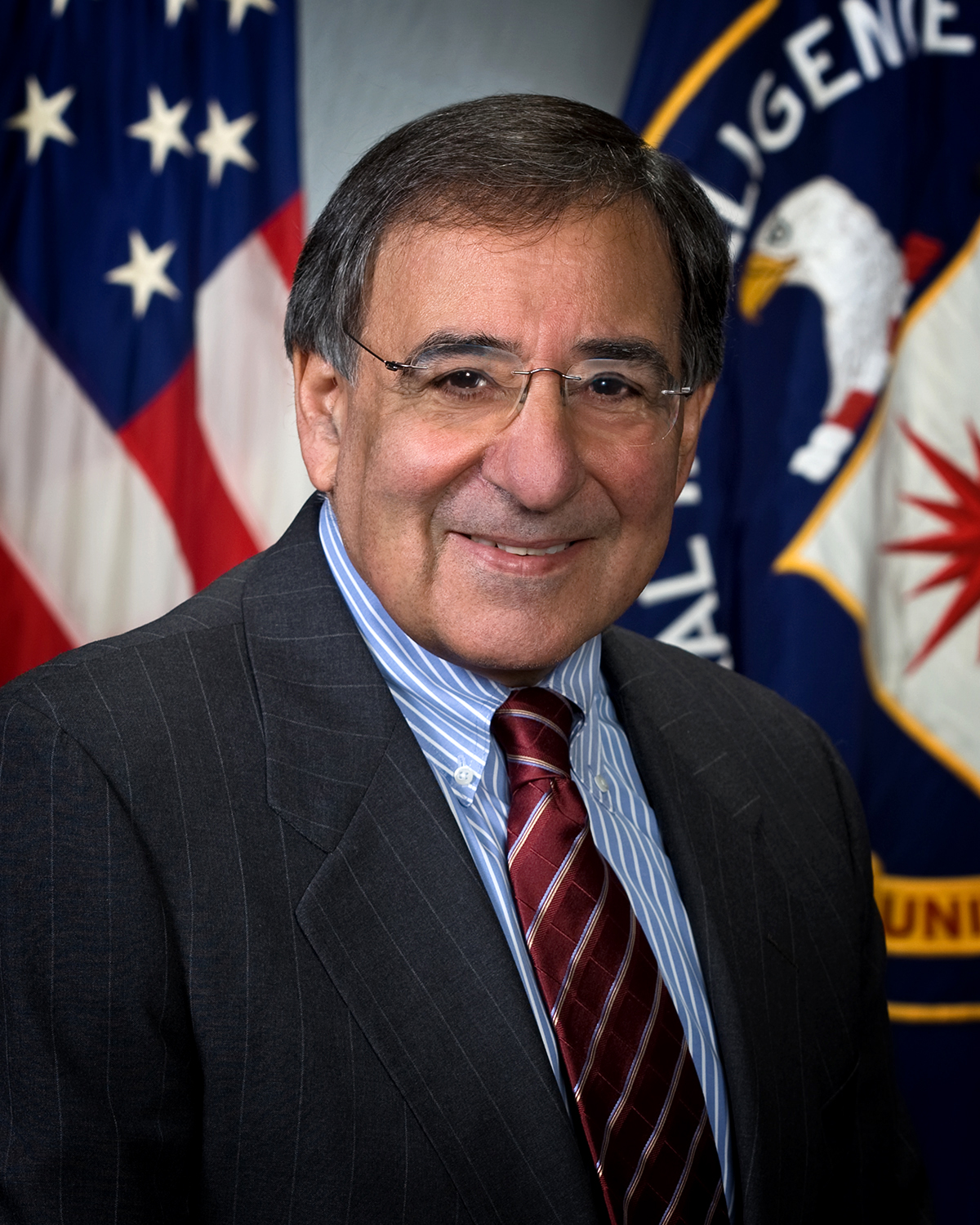
Panetta as director of the CIA

On February 19, 2009, Panetta was sworn in as director of the Central Intelligence Agency by vice president Joe Biden before an audience of CIA employees. Panetta reportedly received a "rock star welcome" from his new subordinates.

As CIA director, Panetta traveled extensively to intelligence outposts around the world and worked with international leaders to confront threats of Islamic extremism and Taliban. In 2010, working with the Senate Intelligence Committee, he conducted a secret review of the use of torture by the CIA (euphemistically referred to as "enhanced interrogation techniques") during the administration of George W. Bush. The review, which came to be known by 2014 as the Panetta Review, yielded a series of memoranda that, according to The New York Times, "cast a particularly harsh light" on the Bush-era interrogation program. The Times noted: "The effort to write the exhaustive history of the C.I.A.'s detention operations was fraught from the beginning. President Obama officially ended the program during his first week in office in 2009. The intelligence committee announced its intention to take a hard look at the program, but there was little appetite inside the [Obama] White House to accede to the committee's request for all classified C.I.A. cables related to it." The findings of the Panetta Review reportedly aligned with much of what the Senate Intelligence Committee report on CIA torture found in its factual accounting. Both reports were largely seen as an effort in fact-finding and prevention, but not a governmental path towards some possible project of accountability or punishment for past interrogation or torture.

Panetta supported the Obama administration's campaign of U.S. drone strikes in Pakistan, which he identified as the "most effective weapon" against senior al-Qaeda leadership. Drone strikes increased significantly under Panetta, with as many as fifty suspected al-Qaeda militants being killed in May 2009 alone.

As director of the CIA, Panetta oversaw the hunt for terrorist leader Osama bin Laden, and played a key role in the operation in which bin Laden was killed on May 1, 2011.

=== Secretary of defense (2011–2013) ===
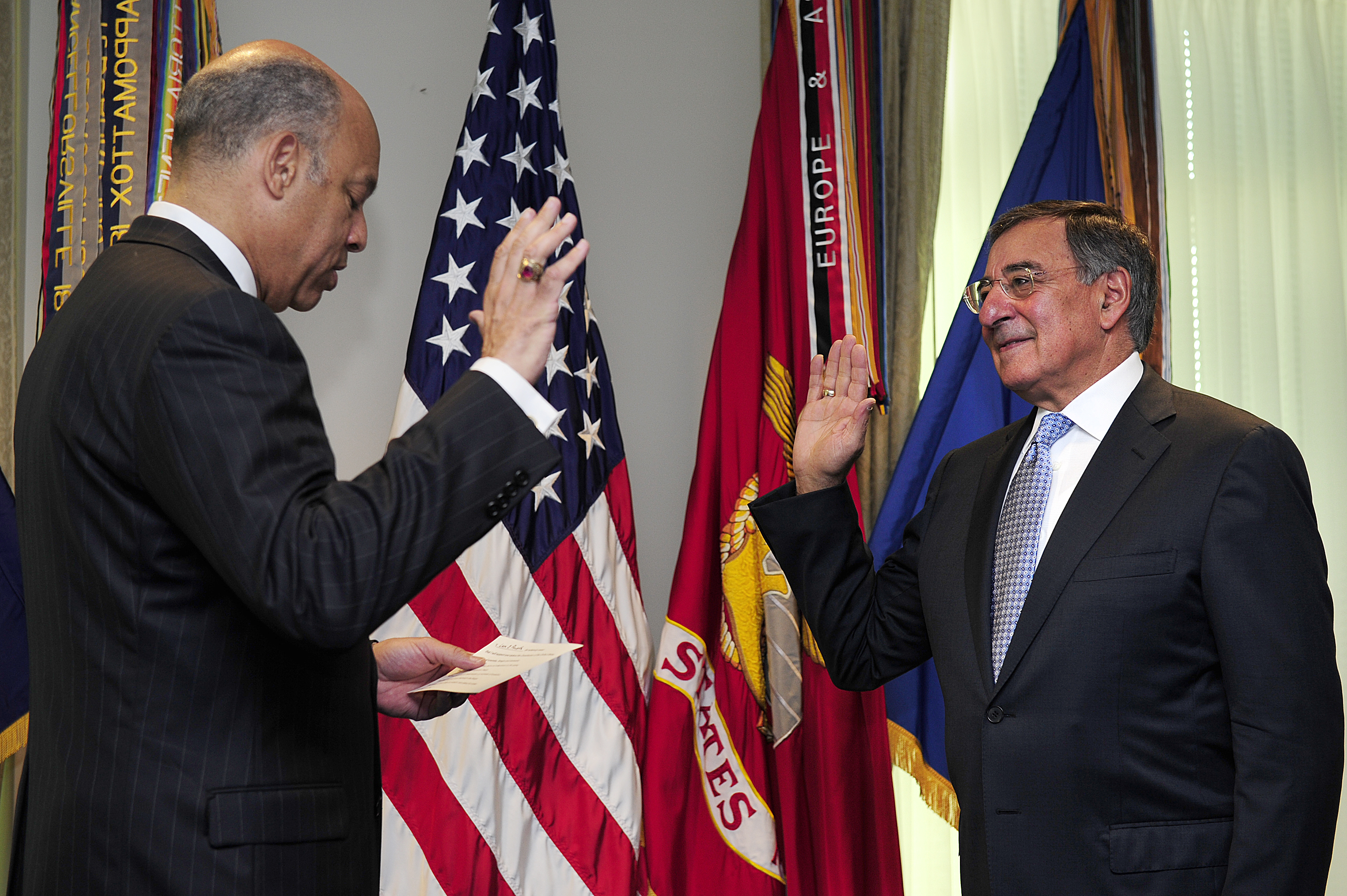
Panetta being sworn in as secretary of defense

==== Nomination ====
On April 28, 2011, President Obama announced the nomination of Panetta as United States secretary of defense as a replacement for retiring Secretary Robert Gates. On June 21, 2011, the Senate confirmed Panetta in an unusual 100–0 vote. He was inaugurated on July 1, 2011.

==== Tenure ====
One of Panetta's first major acts as defense secretary was to jointly certify with the chairman of the Joint Chiefs of Staff that the military was prepared to repeal "Don't Ask, Don't Tell," which triggered final repeal after 60 days.

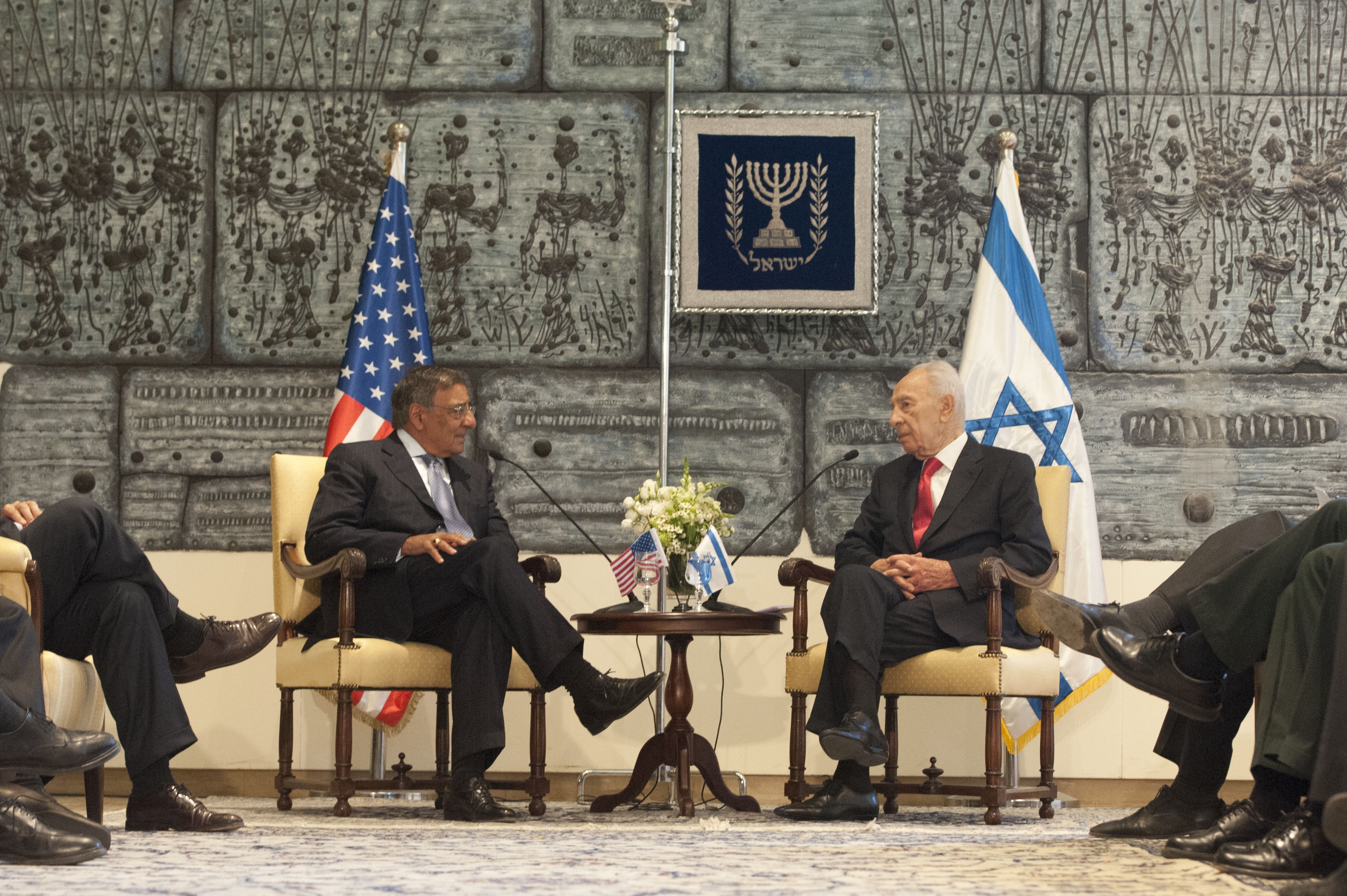
The secretary meeting with Israeli President Shimon Peres, in 2012. In the background, an Israeli basalt ash artwork.

In August 2011, Panetta publicly warned that deeper cuts in the defense budget risked hollowing out the military and would hamper Pentagon efforts to deal with rising powers such as China, North Korea, and Iran and he urged Congress not to go beyond the roughly $500 billion in defense cuts required over the next decade under the debt reduction bill signed by president Barack Obama. Working with military and civilian leaders at the Department of Defense, Panetta developed a new defense strategy.

Funding the United States military, in the face of tightening budget constraints, became an ongoing theme of Panetta's tenure. He also warned that future service members may see changes in retirement benefits, and that the military healthcare system may need reforms, to rein in costs, while also ensuring quality care.

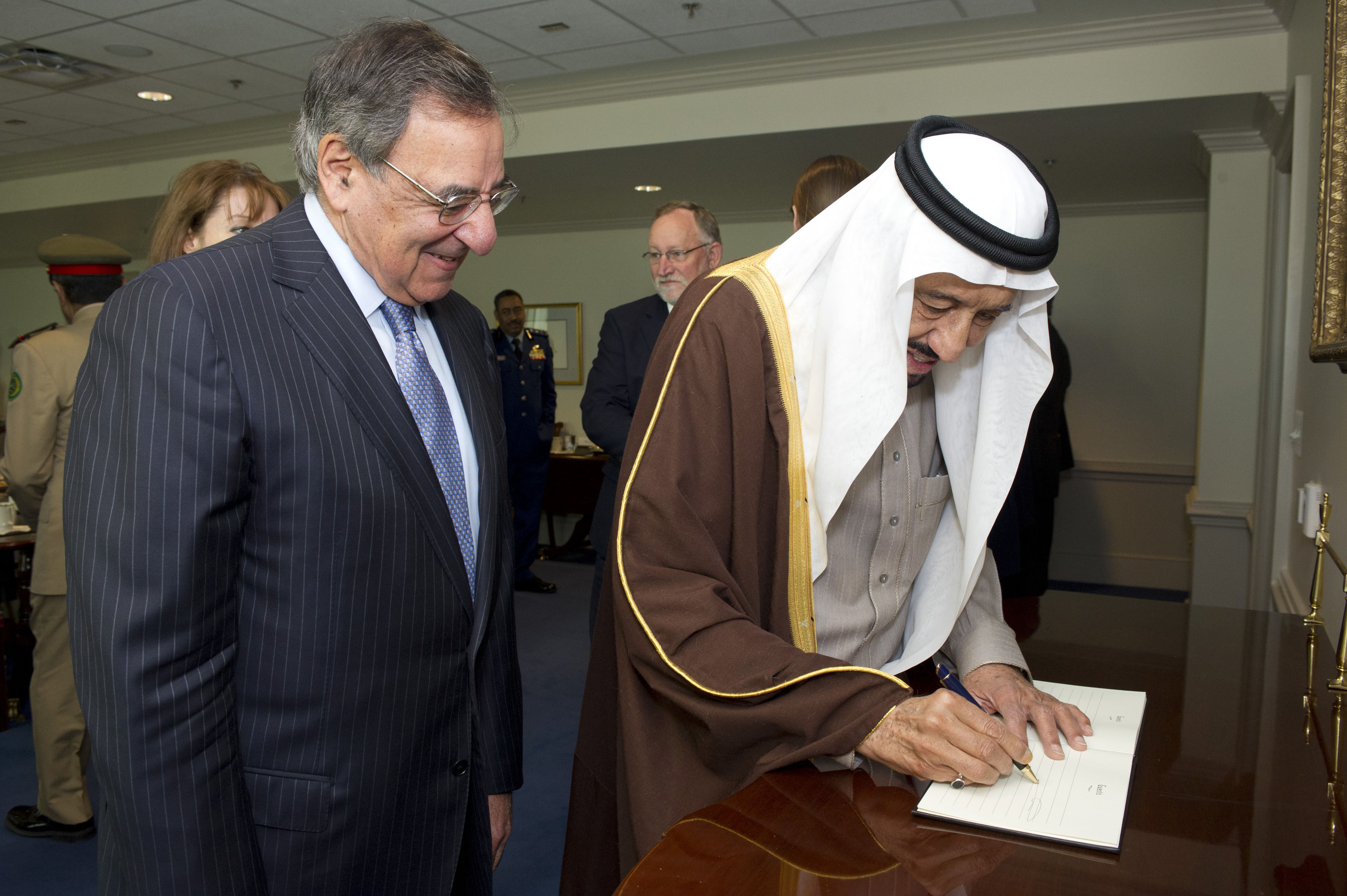
Panetta with Saudi Arabian Minister of Defense Prince Salman bin Abdulaziz Al Saud, Pentagon, April 11, 2012

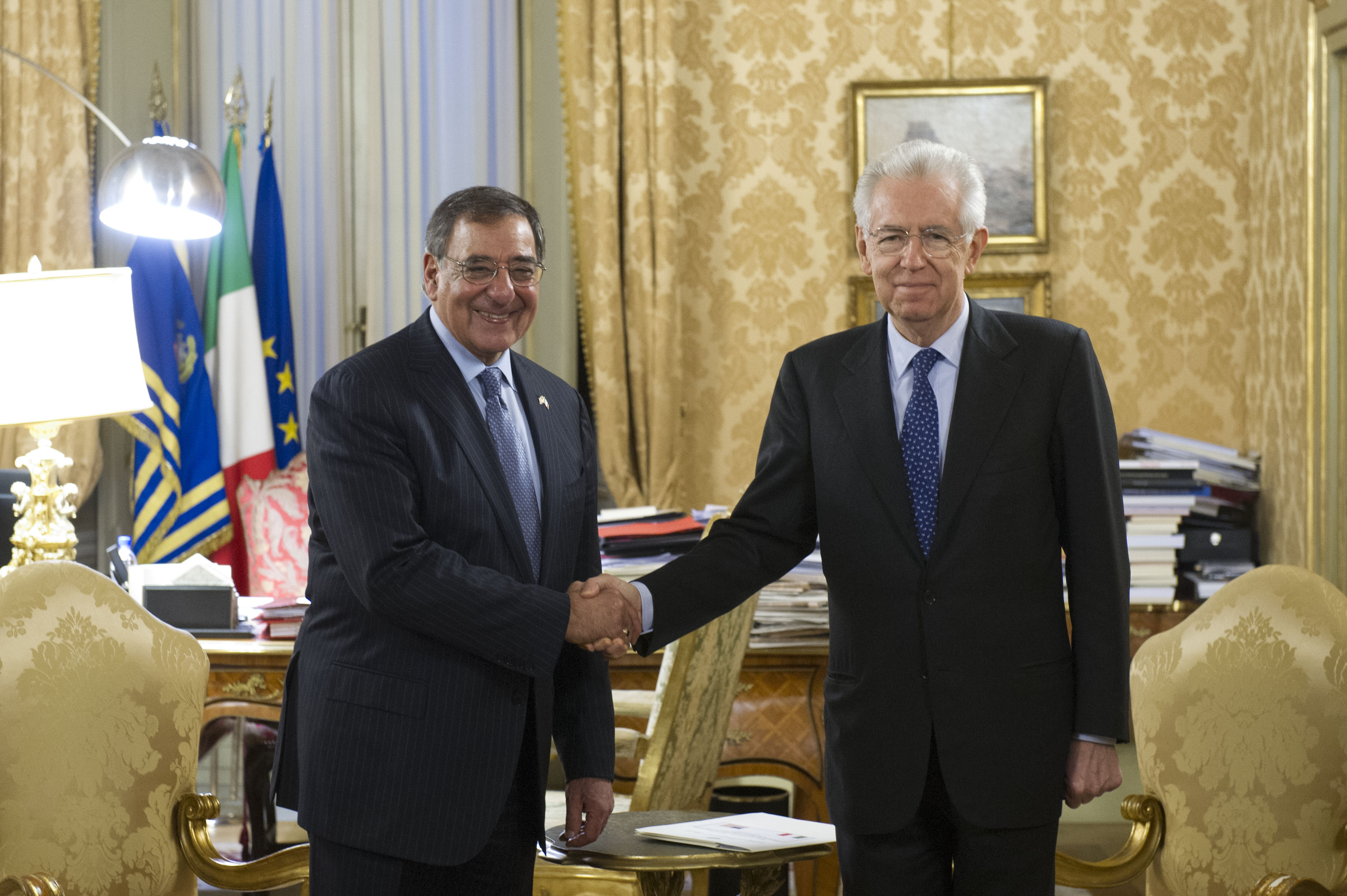
Leon Panetta with Italian Prime Minister Mario Monti in Rome

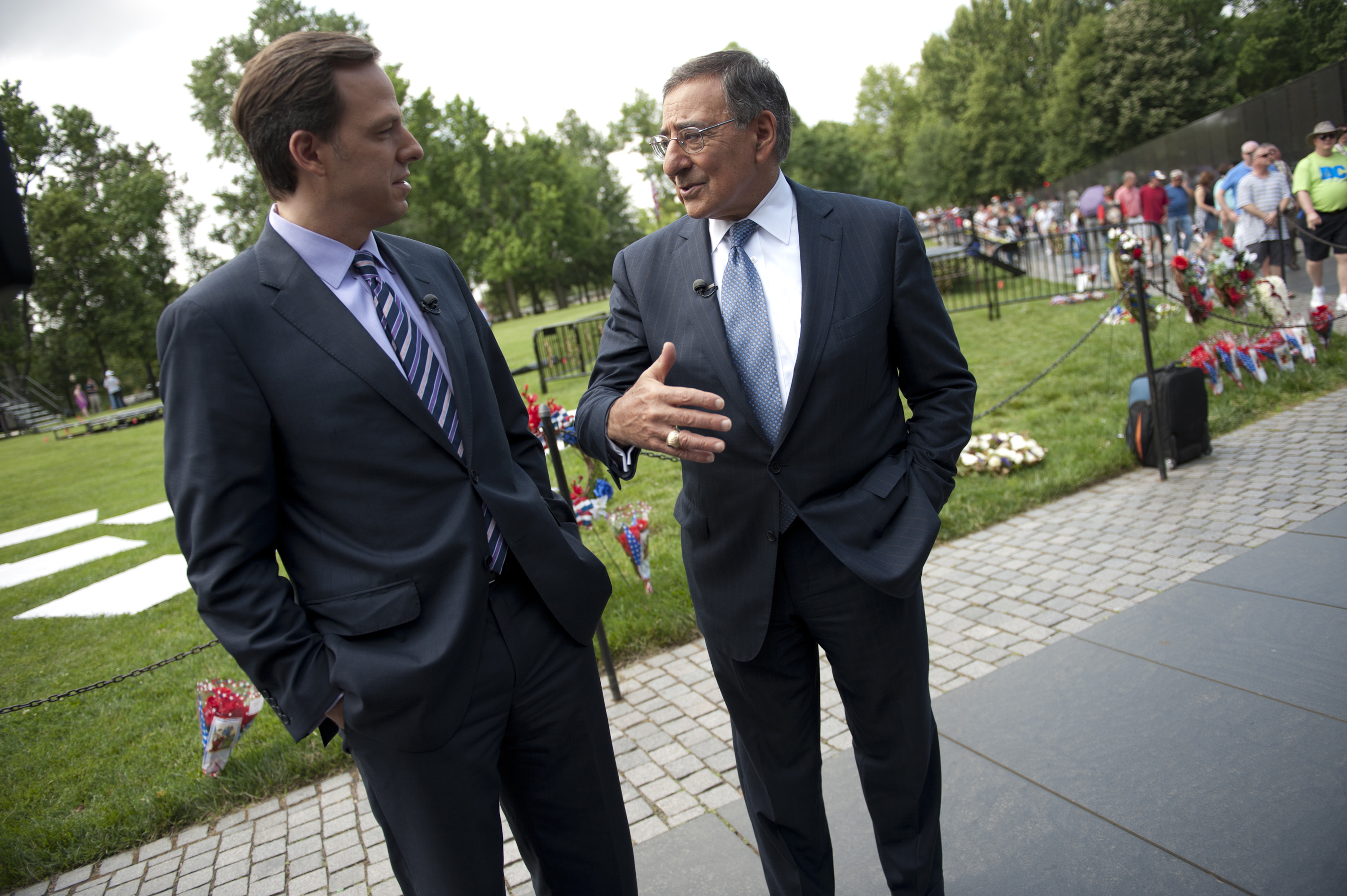
Panetta being interviewed by Jake Tapper, May 2012

Another major issue during Panetta's tenure as defense secretary was the Obama administration's diplomatic effort to dissuade Iran from developing nuclear weapons. In January 2012, Panetta stated that nuclear weapons development was a "red line" that Iran would not be allowed to cross—and that the United States was keeping all options, including military ones, open to completely prevent it. He said that Iran would not be allowed to block the Straits of Hormuz.

In January 2013, shortly before his departure from the defense secretary post, Panetta announced that women would be allowed to enter all combat jobs in the military, citing an assessment phase in which "each branch of service will examine all its jobs and units not currently integrated and then produce a timetable for integrating them."

== Other activities ==
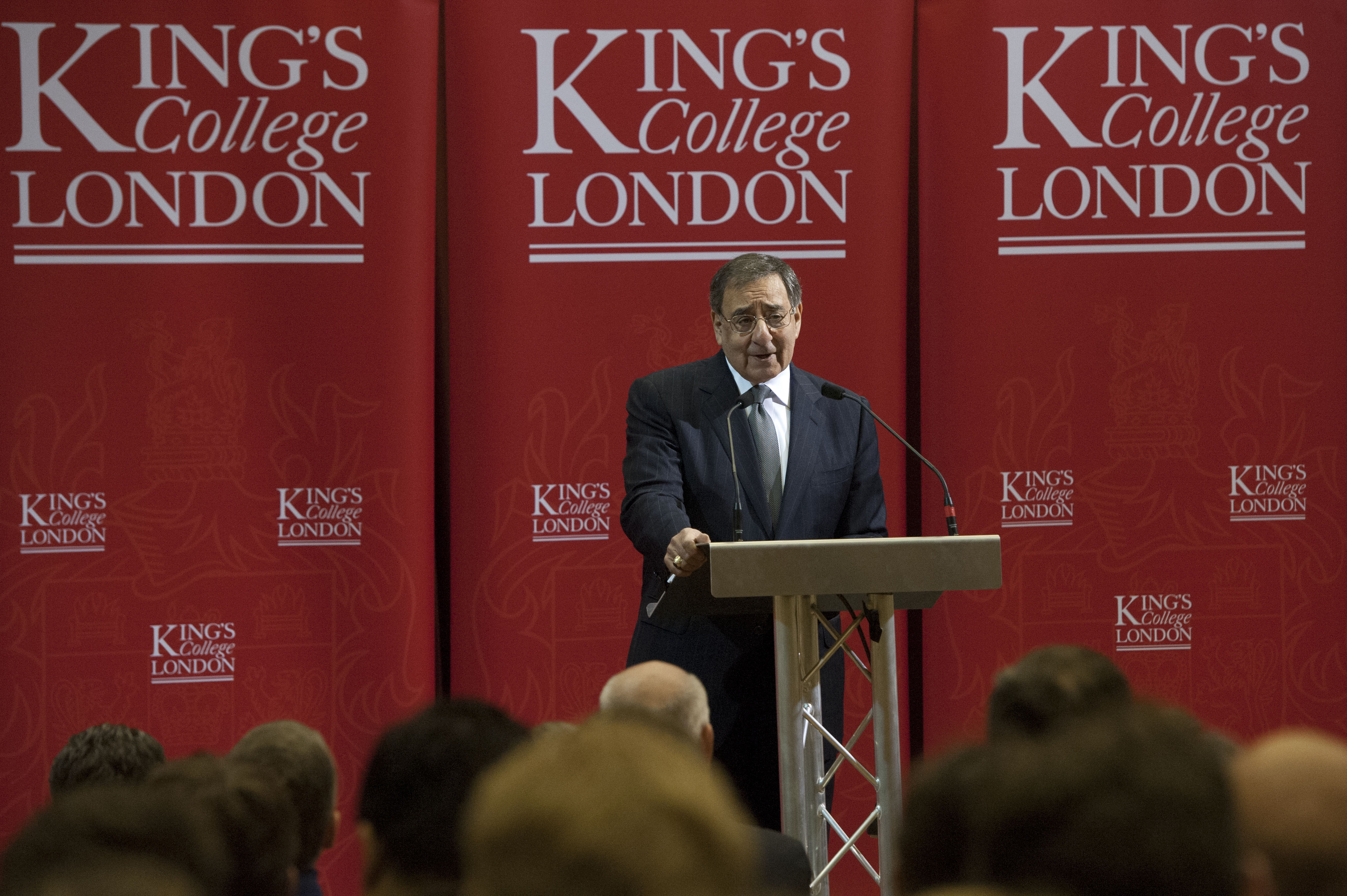
Panetta giving his farewell speech to Europe at King's College London in January 2013

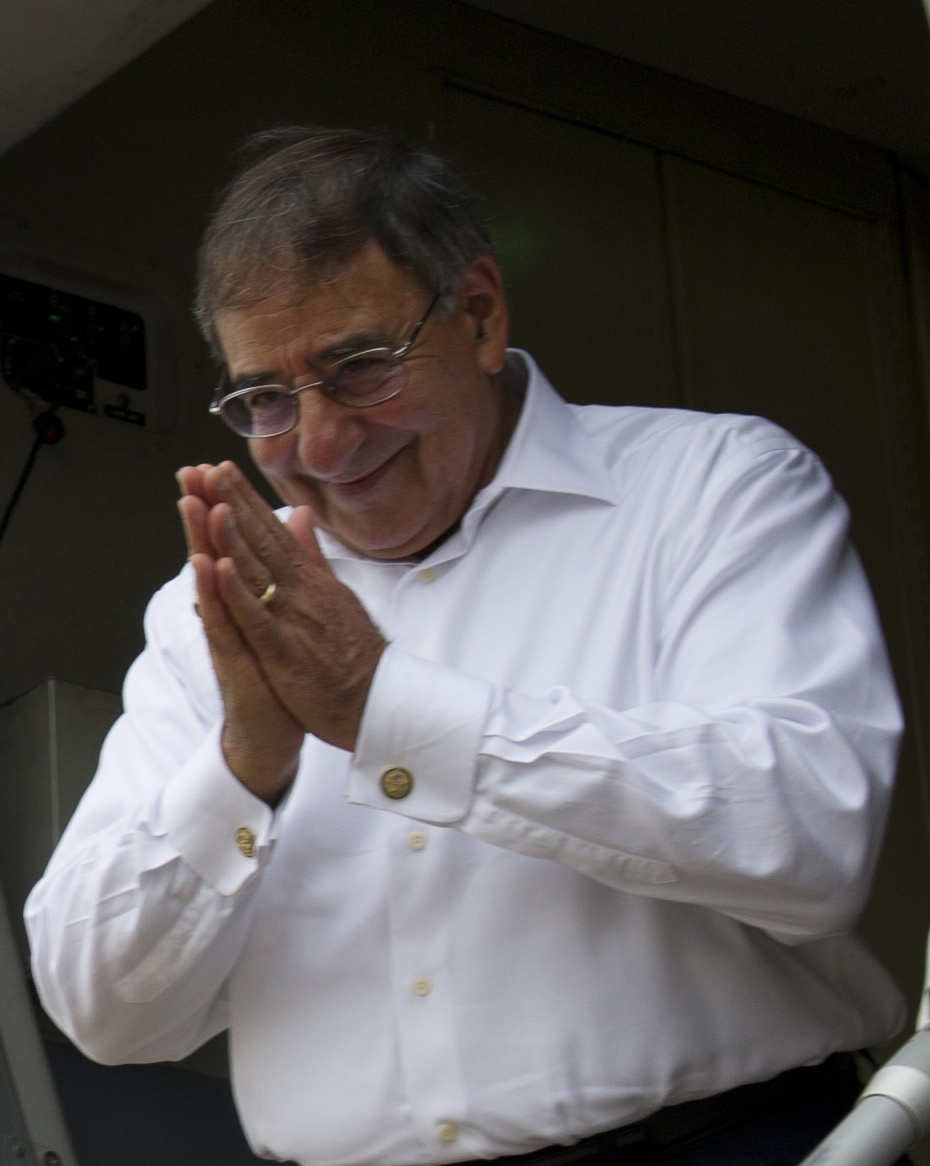
Secretary of Defense Leon E. Panetta gives the traditional Cambodian thank you from the steps of his aircraft before departing Siem Reap, Cambodia on 16 November 2012.

Panetta and his wife Sylvia founded the Panetta Institute for Public Policy in December 1997 and served as co-directors there until 2009, when Panetta was appointed CIA director by Barack Obama while he was president. He has since returned to the institute in the role of chairman, while his wife serves as co-chair and CEO, supervising the institute's day-to-day operations. The institute is located at California State University, Monterey Bay, a campus Panetta was instrumental in creating on the site of the decommissioned Fort Ord Army base when he was a Congressman. Coincidentally, Panetta was stationed at Fort Ord in the 1960s during his service as an Army intelligence officer.

Panetta served on the board of the UC Santa Cruz Foundation, as a Distinguished Scholar to the Chancellor of California State University and as a Presidential Professor at Santa Clara University. He was urged to consider running for Governor of California during the recall election in 2003 but declined in part because of the short time available to raise the necessary campaign funds.

Panetta has long been an advocate for the world's oceans. In addition to introducing legislation and winning passage of ocean protections measures such as the Monterey Bay National Marine Sanctuary during his time in Congress, he was named chairman in 2003 of the Pew Oceans Commission, which in 2005 combined with the U.S. Commission on Ocean Policy to establish the Joint Ocean Commission Initiative. Panetta co-chaired the Joint Ocean Commission Initiative from 2005 to 2010 and continues to serve as a commission member. He presently co-chairs the National Marine Sanctuary Foundation.

In 2006, Panetta was part of the presidentially-appointed Iraq Study Group, or Baker Commission, which studied potential changes in U.S. policy in Iraq.

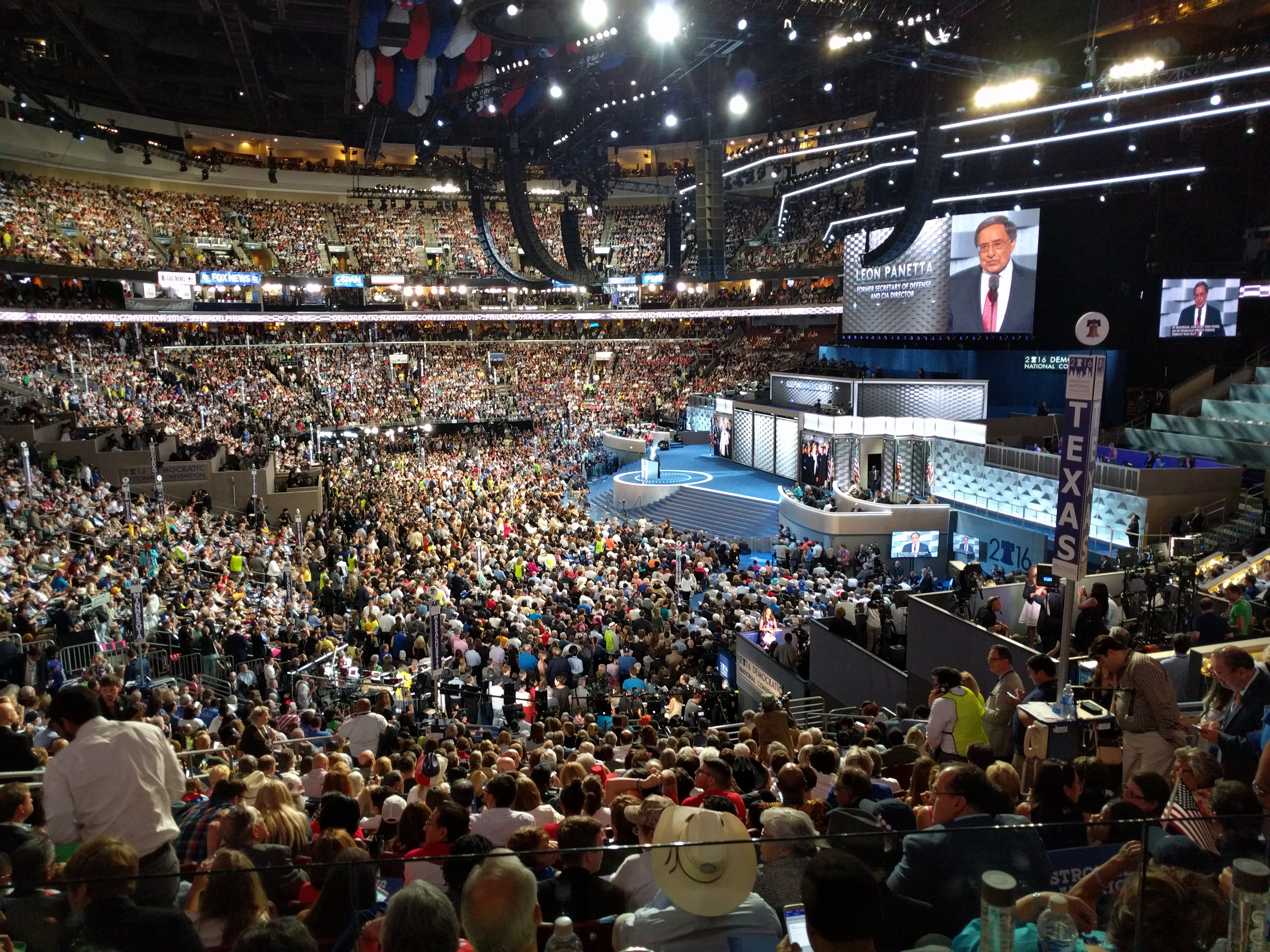
Panetta speaks at the 2016 Democratic National Convention, July 27, 2016.

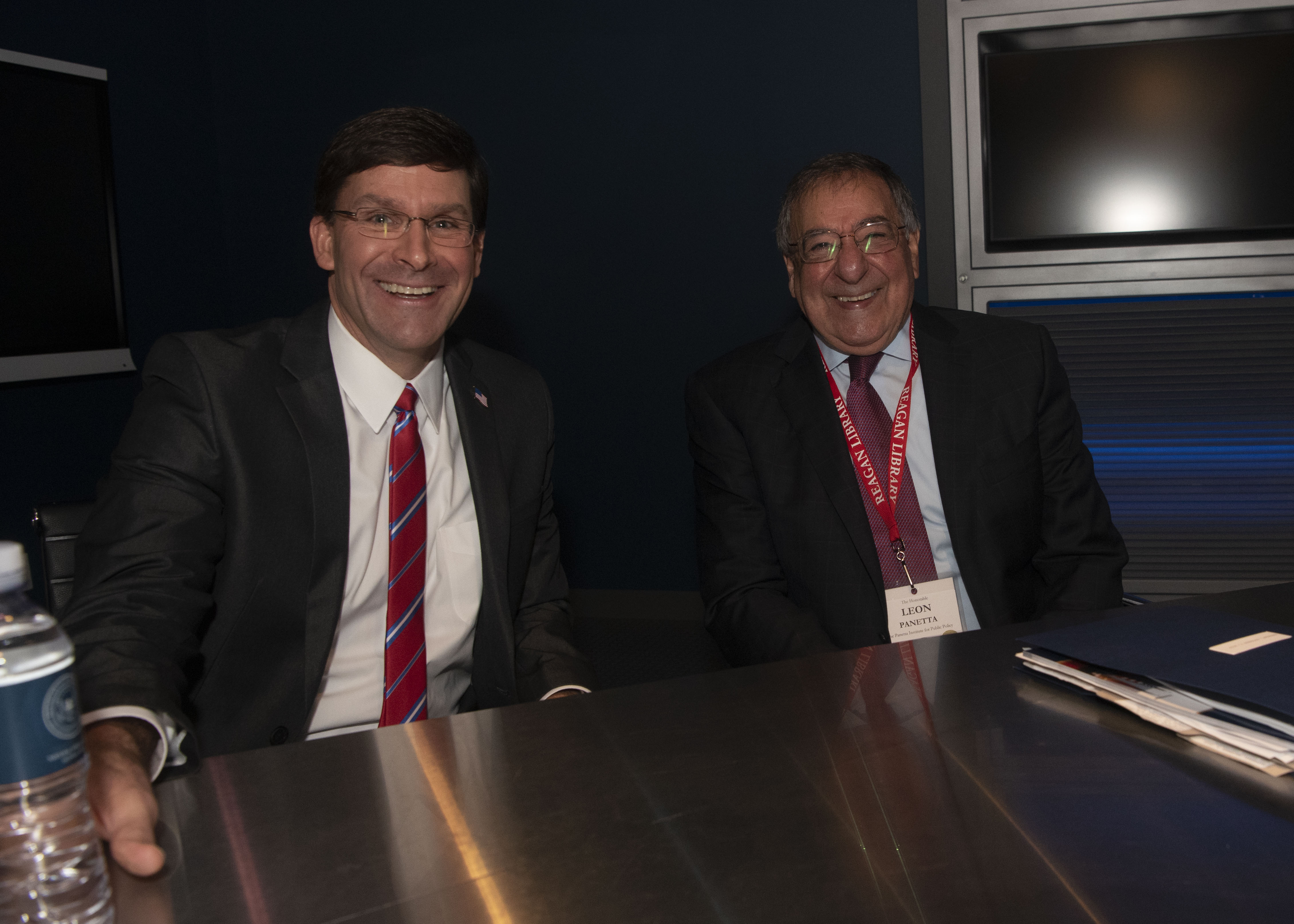
Panetta with Defense Secretary Mark Esper on December 7, 2019

In 2014, Panetta published his memoir Worthy Fights, in which he recounted his long career in public service. While overwhelmingly positive in his assessment of the Obama presidency, Panetta aired some disagreements in the book with the President's policies in Syria and Iraq. The New York Post said: "By failing to persuade Iraq's leader to allow a continuing force of US troops, the commander in chief 'created a vacuum . . . and it's out of that vacuum that ISIS began to breed,' Panetta said."

== Later career (2013–present) ==
Panetta was a speaker on the third day of the 2016 Democratic National Convention in which Hillary Clinton was nominated to run as the Democratic candidate in the presidential election that year. His speech was booed by antiwar supporters of Bernie Sanders who protested his war record.

Panetta told CBS News that Congress releasing the Nunes Memo, which purported to provide intelligence about the open Russia probe, could cause damage to national security.

In October 2020, Panetta and a group of 50 other former senior intelligence officials signed a letter stating the Hunter Biden laptop controversy had “all the classic earmarks of a Russian disinformation operation" because it contained potentially damaging information to the Biden campaign. However, in 2022, several media outlets, including The New York Times and The Washington Post, confirmed the laptop's authenticity.

Panetta compared the fall of Kabul to the Taliban in August 2021 to the failed Bay of Pigs Invasion of Cuba in 1961, saying that "President Kennedy took responsibility for what took place. I strongly recommend to President Biden that he take responsibility . . . admit the mistakes that were made."

Panetta, one of ten living former secretaries of defense, published a Washington Post op-ed piece in January 2021 telling President Trump not to involve the military in determining the outcome of the 2020 elections.

In October 2022, Panetta joined the Council for Responsible Social Media project launched by Issue One to address the negative mental, civic, and public health impacts of social media in the United States, cochaired by former House Democratic Caucus leader Dick Gephardt and former Massachusetts Lieutenant Governor Kerry Healey.

In August 2024, Panetta was a speaker on the fourth day of the Democratic National Convention.

In September 2024, Panetta referred to Israel's pager attack in Lebanon as an act of terrorism.

=== Responsibilities ===
Panetta has held positions within a number of institutions and corporations, including:

- Joint Ocean Commission Initiative, Commissioner and Co-chair
- Pew Oceans Commission, Commissioner and Chairman
- Committee for a Responsible Federal Budget, Co-chair
- Bread for the World, Board of Directors
- National Marine Sanctuary Foundation, Board of Directors
- National Leadership Roundtable on Church Management, Board of Directors (2004–2009)
- New York Stock Exchange,
  - Co-chairman of the Corporate Accountability and Listing Standards Committee
  - Board of Directors (1997–present)
- Close Up Foundation, Board of Directors (1999–present)
- Connetics Investor Relations, Board of Directors (2000–present)
- Fleishman-Hillard
  - Co-chairman of the Corporate Accountability and Listing Standards Committee
  - Co-chairman of the Corporate Credibility Advisory practice
  - Member of the International Advisory Board
- Junior Statesmen Foundation Inc., Trustee (2004)
- Public Policy Institute of California, Board of Directors
- Blue Shield of California, Board of Directors (2013–present)
- Oracle Corporation, Board of Directors (2015–present)
- Center for Tech Diplomacy at Purdue, Global Advisory Board (2021–present)

In June 2002, the U.S. Conference of Catholic Bishops appointed Panetta to their National Review Board, which was created to look into the Catholic Church's sexual abuse scandal. This created controversy because of Panetta's pro-choice stance on abortion and other views seen as conflicting with those of the church.

- Beacon Global Strategies, Senior Counselor (May 2014 – present)

Panetta is also a member of the Partnership for a Secure America's bipartisan advisory board. The Partnership is a non-profit organization based in Washington, DC that promotes bipartisan solutions to national security and foreign policy issues.

Panetta serves on the advisory board of the committee to Investigate Russia.

== Personal life ==
Panetta is Catholic. He is married to Sylvia Marie Varni, who administered his home district offices during his terms in Congress. They live on his family's 12-acre (4.9 ha) walnut farm in Carmel Valley, California. They have three sons and six grandchildren. In 2016, their third son, Jimmy Panetta, a former Monterey County Deputy District Attorney, won election to his father's old congressional seat, now numbered as the 19th District.

== Awards ==
- 1966: Army Commendation Medal
- 1969: Abraham Lincoln Award, National Education Association
- 1983: Foreign Language Advocate Award, Northeast Conference on the Teaching of Foreign Languages.
- 1983: Ralph B. Atkinson Award for Civil Liberties, Monterey County Chapter of the ACLU
- 1984: A. Philip Randolph Award
- 1988: Golden Plow Award, American Farm Bureau Federation
- 1991: President's Award, American Council on the Teaching of Foreign Languages
- 1991: Coastal and Ocean Management Award, Coastal Zone Foundation
- 1993: Peter Burnett Award for Distinguished Public Service
- 1995: Distinguished Public Service Medal, Center for the Study of the Presidency
- 1997: Special Achievement Award for Public Service, National Italian American Foundation
- 2001: John H. Chafee Coastal Stewardship Award, Coastal America
- 2002: Law Alumni Special Achievement Award, Santa Clara University School of Law Alumni Association
- 2003: Julius A. Stratton "Champion of the Coast" Award for Coastal Leadership
- 2005: Received an honorary Doctorate from University of Wisconsin–Parkside
- 2005: Received an honorary Doctorate of Public Service from Northeastern University
- 2006: Paul Peck Award
- 2012: Intrepid Freedom Award, Intrepid Sea, Air & Space Museum
- 2012: Golden Plate Award, American Academy of Achievement
- 2014: Excellence in Policy, Peter Benchley Ocean Awards
- 2015: Dwight D. Eisenhower Award, National Defense Industrial Association
- 2018: Sylvanus Thayer Award from the United States Military Academy
- 2019: Grand Cordon of the Order of the Rising Sun
- 2023: Prize For American-Italian Relations, Center for American Studies (Rome)
- 2024: Inducted into the California Hall of Fame

== Books ==
- Panetta, Leon (2014). Worthy Fights: A Memoir of Leadership in War and Peace. Penguin Press HC. ISBN 978-1594205965.

== In popular culture ==
Panetta was portrayed by James Gandolfini in the film Zero Dark Thirty (2012).

U.S. House of Representatives
Preceded by Burt Talcott	Member of the U.S. House of Representatives from California's 16th congressional district 1977–1993	Succeeded by Don Edwards
Preceded by Cal Dooley	Member of the U.S. House of Representatives from California's 17th congressional district 1993	Succeeded by Sam Farr
Preceded by Bill Gray	Chair of the House Budget Committee; 1989–1993	Succeeded by Martin Sabo
Political offices
Preceded by Richard Darman	Director of the Office of Management and Budget; 1993–1994	Succeeded by Alice Rivlin
Preceded by Mack McLarty	White House Chief of Staff; 1994–1997	Succeeded by Erskine Bowles
Preceded by Robert Gates	United States Secretary of Defense; 2011–2013	Succeeded by Chuck Hagel
Government offices
Preceded by Michael Hayden	Director of the Central Intelligence Agency; 2009–2011	Succeeded by Michael Morell; Acting
U.S. order of precedence (ceremonial)
Preceded by Kathleen Sebelius as Former U.S. Cabinet Member	Order of precedence of the United States as Former U.S. Cabinet Member	Succeeded by Chuck Hagel as Former U.S. Cabinet Member
