= Paul G. Gaffney II =

United States Navy vice admiral and university administrator (1946 - )

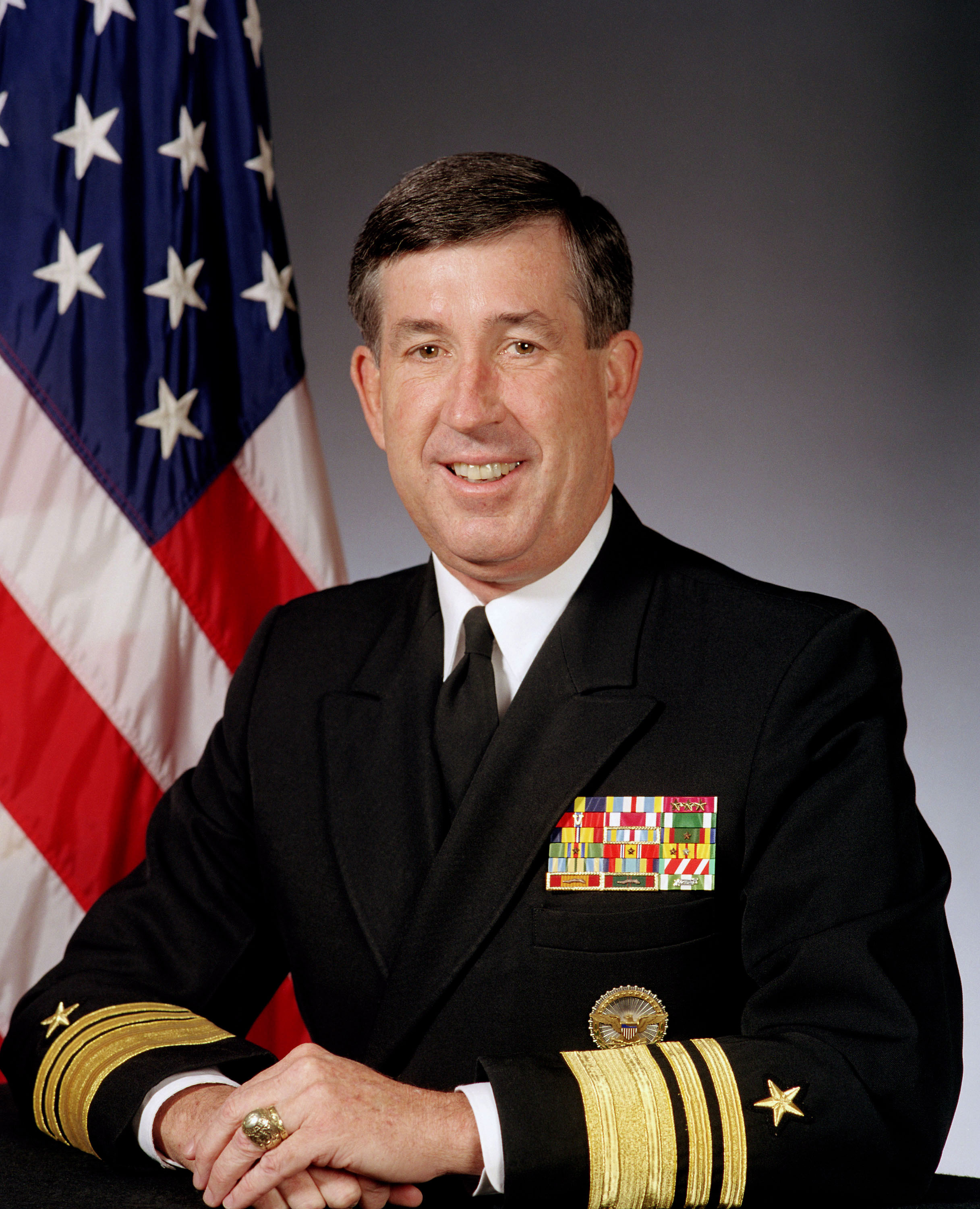
- VADM Paul G. Gaffney II (Ret.), as president of National Defense University, 06/12/2000

Seventh President of Monmouth University
- In office July 2003 – July 2013

Personal details
- Born: May 30, 1946 (age 80) Attleboro, Massachusetts
- Education: United States Naval Academy; The Catholic University of America; Naval War College; Jacksonville University

Vice Admiral Paul Golden Gaffney II, USN (Ret.), (born May 30, 1946) was the seventh president of Monmouth University in West Long Branch, New Jersey, from 2003 to 2013, becoming president emeritus August 1, 2013.

== Early life and education ==
Gaffney was born on May 30, 1946, in Attleboro, Massachusetts.

Gaffney graduated from the United States Naval Academy in 1968. Upon graduation, he was selected for immediate graduate education and received a master's degree in ocean engineering from The Catholic University of America in Washington, D.C. He completed a year as a student and advanced research fellow at the Naval War College, graduating with highest distinction. He completed an M.B.A. at Jacksonville University. The University of South Carolina, Jacksonville University, and The Catholic University of America have awarded him honorary doctorates.

== Career ==
He was president of the National Defense University from 2000 to 2003. Admiral Gaffney was the chief of naval research with responsibility for science and technology investment for the Navy and Marine Corps from 1996 to 2000 and commander of naval oceanography and meteorology, from 1994 to 1997. He commanded the U.S. Naval Research Laboratory, from 1991 to 1994. In 2001 he was appointed by the president to the United States Commission on Ocean Policy, and served through the full term of the commission until 2004. In August 2009, Gaffney was named the chair of the Ocean Research Advisory Panel (ORAP), a panel created by statute to advise federal agencies regarding ocean science and management matters. In 2012 he co-chaired the Decadal Review of the US Ocean Exploration Program. In October 2014, he was appointed as the first chair of new statutory Ocean Exploration Advisory Board (OAEB), serving until 2017. He served as a member of the National Academies of Science, Engineering and Medicine's Gulf of Mexico Research Program Advisory Board from 2015 to 2019.

Gaffney's naval career spanned over three decades including duty at sea, overseas, and ashore in operational, executive and command positions. He served in Japan, Vietnam, Spain, and Indonesia. While a military officer, his career focused on operational oceanography in Southeast Asia and the Mediterranean, with experience in foreign relations, research administration, and higher education.

He has served on several boards of higher education and was a member of the Ocean Studies Board of the United States National Research Council. He served as a director of Diamond Offshore Drilling Inc., and as a Fellow of the Urban Coast Institute at Monmouth University from 2013 to 2025. In 2010, he was elected to the National Academy of Engineering for technical leadership in naval research and development and its impact on U.S. defense, ocean policy, and the Arctic. He has chaired National Academies’ Committees on: assessment of hydrokinetic energy, domestic transportation of energy fluids, understanding and predicting the Gulf of Mexico Loop Current, and Integration Readiness Levels. and chaired a National Academies consensus study on the Gulf of Mexico Loop Current.

Gaffney retired from Monmouth University in August 2013.

He is currently counselor to the dean of engineering and computing at the University of South Carolina, and is a strategic advisor to Ocean Aero Inc.

== Awards and honors ==
He is the eponym of Gaffney Ridge, an undersea ridge in the South China Sea, 220 miles west of the Philippines (located at Latitude 13° 23' 00" N and Longitude 118° 32' 00" E). Gaffney also became the namesake of a supercomputer at the Department of Defense Supercomputing Resource Center at the John C. Stennis Space Center, in Hancock County, Miss., when he was honored by the Naval Meteorology and Oceanography Command (NMOC) on January 25, 2019.

Gaffney is the recipient of Defense and Navy Distinguished Service Medals, Legions of Merit (4), Bronze Star (w/”V”), the Naval War College's J. William Middendorf Prize for Strategic Research, and the Potomac Institute for Policy Studies Navigator Award, the Aquarium of the Pacific Ocean Conservation Award, the Leadership Award from the New Jersey Vietnam Veterans Memorial Foundation, and has been inducted into the Naval Meteorology and Oceanography Command Hall of Fame.

His contributions to the success of Monmouth University and its athletic programs during his tenure were noted in the naming of the University’s competition basketball court as "Gaffney Court."[19]"

== Sources ==
- National Defense University
- Potomac Institute Navigator Awards
- J. William Middendorf. Prize for Strategic Research
- US Board on Geographic Names
- Consortium for Ocean Leadership
