= Carlisle Trost =

United States admiral (1930–2020)

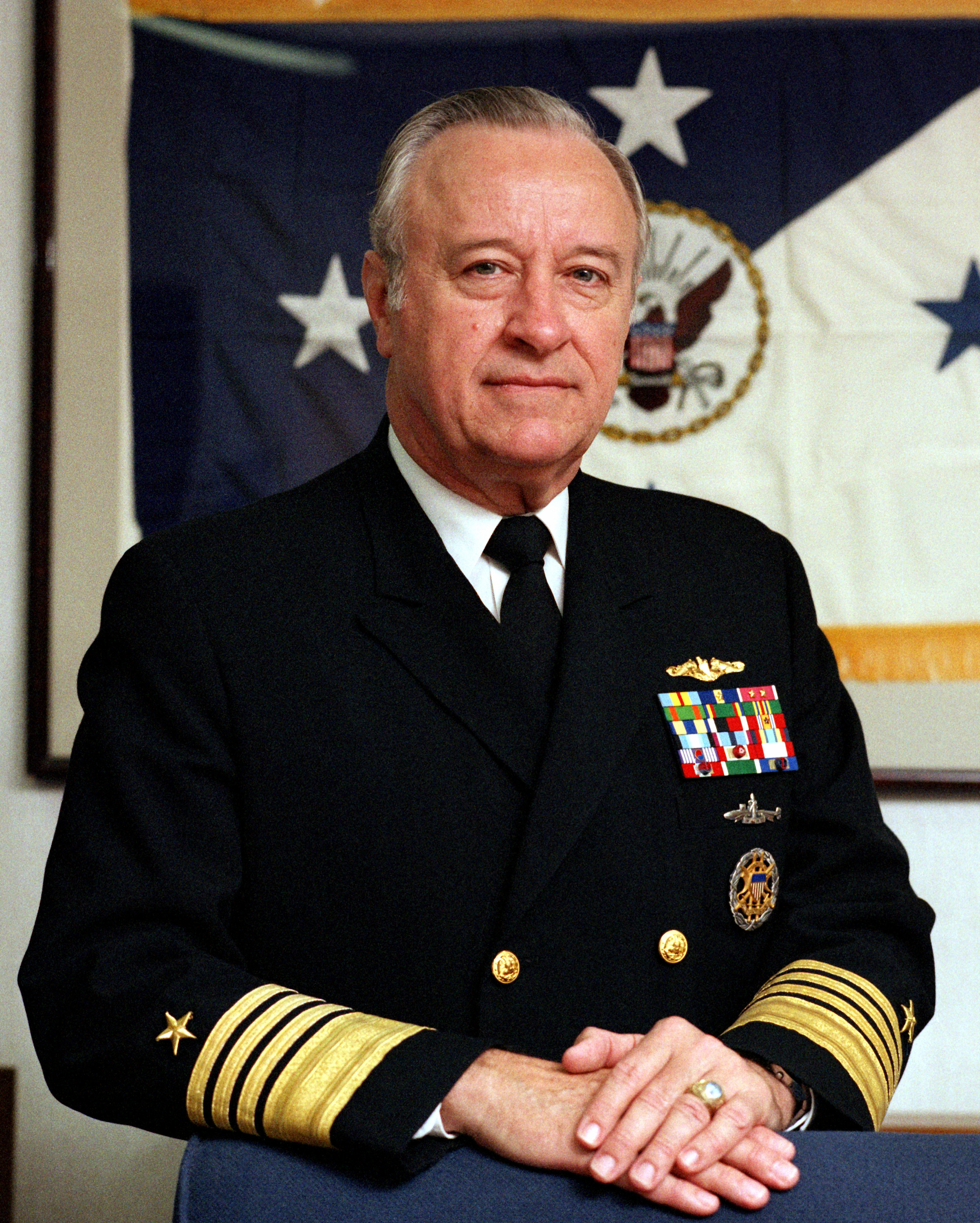
- Trost in 1990
- Born: April 24, 1930; Valmeyer, Illinois, U.S.
- Died: September 29, 2020 (aged 90); Maryland, U.S.
- Military career
- Allegiance: United States
- Branch: United States Navy
- Service years: 1953–1990
- Rank: Admiral
- Commands: Chief of Naval Operations; United States Atlantic Fleet; United States Seventh Fleet; Submarine Group Five; Submarine Flotilla One
- Awards: Defense Distinguished Service Medal (2); Navy Distinguished Service Medal (3); Army Distinguished Service Medal; Air Force Distinguished Service Medal; Legion of Merit (3)
- Other work: Chairman, U.S. Naval Academy Alumni Association

Carlisle Albert Herman Trost (April 24, 1930 – September 29, 2020) was a United States Navy officer who served as the 23rd Chief of Naval Operations (CNO) and a member of the Joint Chiefs of Staff from July 1, 1986, to June 29, 1990. He oversaw the Navy during the end of the Cold War. He retired from active naval service on July 1, 1990, following completion of a four-year term as CNO.

== Early life and education ==
Trost was born in Valmeyer, Illinois, on April 24, 1930. Trost graduated first in his United States Naval Academy class of 1953 and was commissioned as an ensign.

== Career ==
Trost volunteered and was accepted to begin submarine training in 1954 and once again graduated first in his class from Submarine School in New London, Connecticut. During his more than thirty-seven years of commissioned service, Trost served at sea in destroyers and diesel-powered and nuclear submarines, including tours as executive officer of two nuclear-powered submarines and as commanding officer of a Fleet Ballistic Missile submarine.

After selection to flag rank in 1973, Trost commanded Submarine Flotilla One/Submarine Group FIVE. Later operational assignments included deputy commander, United States Pacific Fleet; commander, Seventh Fleet (1980–1981); Commander-in-Chief, United States Atlantic Fleet (1985–1986), and deputy commander, United States Atlantic Command.

Trost served as military assistant to the Deputy Secretary of Defense, executive assistant to the Secretary of the Navy, and on the Navy Staff as Director, Systems Analysis Division, Assistant Chief of Naval Personnel and Director, Navy Program Planning.

In May 1986, Trost was nominated by President Ronald Reagan to succeed Admiral James D. Watkins as Chief of Naval Operations (CNO). Trost served as CNO from July 1, 1986, to June 29, 1990. He was succeeded by Admiral Frank B. Kelso.

== Awards and decorations ==
Officer Submarine Warfare insignia
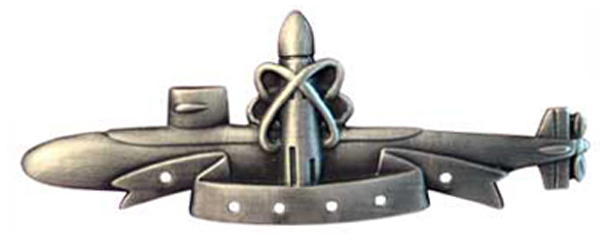
Silver SSBN Deterrent Patrol insignia with one gold star
Office of the Joint Chiefs of Staff Identification Badge

Defense Distinguished Service Medal with one bronze oak leaf cluster
Navy Distinguished Service Medal with two gold award stars
Army Distinguished Service Medal
Air Force Distinguished Service Medal
Legion of Merit with two award stars
Navy and Marine Corps Achievement Medal
Navy Unit Commendation
Navy Meritorious Unit Commendation
Navy Expeditionary Medal
Navy Occupation Service Medal
National Defense Service Medal with one bronze service star
Antarctica Service Medal
Humanitarian Service Medal
Navy Sea Service Deployment Ribbon
Order of National Security Merit Gukseon Medal, 2nd Class (Republic of Korea)
Order of the Rising Sun Grand Cordon (Japan)
Order of the Cloud and Banner with Grand Cordon, 2nd Grade (Republic of China)
Order of Naval Merit, Grand Officer (Brazil)
Unidentified
Royal Norwegian Order of Merit, Commander with Star

Trost was an Olmsted Scholar. He was active in the Boy Scouts of America as an adult, an Eagle Scout and recipient of the Distinguished Eagle Scout Award.

== Organizational affiliations ==
Trost was recognized as a distinguished graduate of the United States Naval Academy and also served on the board of directors of the Alumni Association, as well as President of the Class of '53. A classmate and another past President of the Class of '53 was the late Texas businessman and former presidential candidate H. Ross Perot.

== Post-naval career ==
Since his retirement from the Navy, Trost served on the boards of directors of a number of corporations. He served as Chairman of the Board of the United States Naval Academy Alumni Association in a term that ended in Spring 2009. Trost died on September 29, 2020, at the age of 90.

== Notes ==
Military offices
| Preceded by James D. Watkins | Chief of Naval Operations; 1986–1990 | Succeeded by Frank B. Kelso |
