= Oceans Act of 2000 =

US law to establish policy on the oceans

- Long title: An Act to establish a Commission on Ocean Policy, and for other purposes.
- Acronyms (colloquial): OA
- Enacted by: the 106th United States Congress
- Effective: January 20, 2001

Citations
- Public law: 106-256
- Statutes at Large: 114 Stat. 644

Codification
- Titles amended: 33 U.S.C.: Navigable Waters
- U.S.C. sections created: 33 U.S.C. ch. 17, subch. I § 857–19

Legislative history
- Introduced in the Senate as S. 2327 by Ernest Hollings (D-SC) on March 29, 2000; Committee consideration by Senate Commerce, Science, and Transportation, House Resources; Passed the Senate on June 26, 2000 (Passed unanimous consent); Passed the House on July 25, 2000 (Passed voice vote); Signed into law by President Bill Clinton on August 7, 2000

The Oceans Act of 2000 established the United States Commission on Ocean Policy, a working group tasked with the development of what would be known as the National Oceans Report.

The objective of the report is to promote the following:

1. Protection of life and property;
2. Stewardship of ocean and coastal resources;
3. Protection of marine environment and prevention of marine pollution;
4. Enhancement of maritime commerce;
5. Expansion of human knowledge of the marine environment;
6. Investments in technologies to promote energy and food security;
7. Close cooperation among government agencies; and
8. U.S. leadership in ocean and coastal activities.

Responses from the executive branch to the commission's report are listed in a National Ocean Policy, sent to the legislative branch.

The act was passed by the United States Congress on July 25, 2000 and signed by the President a fortnight later.

== The Commission ==
- Has 16 members
- U.S. House and U.S. Senate Majority nominate 8 people each and the U.S. President appoints 4 from each list
- U.S. House and U.S. Senate Minority nominates four people each and the U.S. President appoints two from each
- 4 people self-determined by U.S. President

Chair: supervises commission staff and regulates funding.

Members must be "balanced by area of expertise and balanced geographically".

To be eligible, members must be "Representatives, knowledgeable in ocean and coastal activities, from state and local governments, ocean-related industries, academic and technical institutions, and public interest organizations involved with scientific, regulatory, economic, and environmental ocean and coastal activities." (https://web.archive.org/web/20060207190735/http://www.oceancommission.gov/documents/oceanact.html)

The Commission's report is required to include the following, as relevant to U.S. ocean and coastal activities:

1. an assessment of facilities (people, vessels, computers, satellites)
2. a review of federal activities
3. a review of the cumulative effect of federal laws
4. a review of the supply and demand for ocean and coastal resources
5. a review of the relationships between federal, state, and local governments, and the private sector
6. a review of the opportunities for the investment in new products and technologies
7. recommendations for modifications to federal laws and/or the structure of federal agencies
8. a review of the effectiveness of existing federal interagency policy coordination

The Commission is to give equal consideration to environmental, technical feasibility, economic, and scientific factors. In addition, the recommendations may not be specific to the lands or waters within a single state.

== Other Roles ==
- Science Advisory Panel
  - The Commission consults the Ocean Studies Board to create a science advisory panel. This panel assists in the Commission's report by analyzing and guarantees that all scientific information is accurate and based on the best available data.
- Staff
  - The Commission is authorized to hire an Executive Director and other staff.
- Role of states
  - The U.S. Governor of each coastal state will be given a copy of the Commission's draft report. They will add their own comments to be included the final report. The U.S. President consults the states to formalize his National Ocean Policy.
- Other Resources
  - Any U.S. federal agency and other experts are allowed to provide information to the Commission.

== Meetings ==
The Commission is required to hold public meetings. The Commission must hold at least one meeting in each of 6 specified areas around the country. Meetings must be advertised in the U.S. Federal Register.

== Committees ==
The bill has been referred to the following committees:

- U.S. Senate Commerce, Science, and Transportation
- U.S. House Resources

== Timeline ==
- 3/29/2000:Sponsor introductory remarks on measure; Read twice and referred to the Committee on Commerce, Science, and Transportation.
- 4/13/2000:Committee on Commerce, Science, and Transportation. Ordered to be reported without amendment favorably.
- 5/23/2000:Committee on Commerce, Science, and Transportation; Reported to Senate by Senator McCain without amendment. With written report No. 106-301; Placed on Senate Legislative Calendar under General Orders. Calendar No. 568.
- 6/26/2000:Measure laid before Senate by unanimous consent.
  - S.AMDT.3620 Amendment SA 3620 proposed by Senator Thomas for Senator Hollings; To establish a Commission on Ocean Policy, and for other purposes.
  - S.AMDT.3620 Amendment SA 3620 agreed to in Senate by Unanimous Consent.
  - Passed Senate with an amendment by Unanimous Consent.
  - Message on Senate action sent to the House.
  - Received in the House.
  - Referred to the House Committee on Resources.
- 7/25/2000 Mr. Saxton moved to suspend the rules and pass the bill.
  - Considered under suspension of the rules.
  - DEBATE - The House proceeded with forty minutes of debate on S. 2327.
  - On motion to suspend the rules and pass the bill Agreed to by voice vote.
  - Motion to reconsider laid on the table Agreed to without objection.
  - Cleared for White House.
- 7/27/2000:Presented to President.
- 8/7/2000:Signed by President.
  - Became Public Law No: 106-256.

== Amendments ==
S.Amdt. 3620 by U.S. Sen. Hollings [D-SC]

- To establish a Commission on Ocean Policy, and for other purposes.
- Proposed: June 26, 2000.
- Accepted: June 26, 2000.

== Funding ==
The Act provides for $8.5 million for the Commission.

In 1999, $3.5 million was appropriated for the same effort, but never used. Therefore, only $2.5 million would need to be accumulated to completely cover the cost of this act.

== Representational Members ==
- Sponsor: U.S. Sen. Ernest Hollings [D-SC]
- U.S. President: Bill Clinton
- Cosponsors:
  - Daniel Akaka [D-HI]
  - Barbara Boxer [D-CA]
  - John Breaux [D-LA]
  - Max Cleland [D-GA]
  - Dianne Feinstein [D-CA]
  - Daniel Inouye [D-HI]
  - John Kerry [D-MA]
  - Mary Landrieu [D-LA]
  - Frank Lautenberg [D-NJ]
  - Joseph Lieberman [D-CT]
  - Daniel Moynihan [D-NY]
  - Frank Murkowski [R-AK]
  - Patty Murray [D-WA]
  - Jack Reed [D-RI]
  - William Roth [R-DE]
  - Paul Sarbanes [D-MD]
  - Chuck Schumer [D-NY]

== Biennial Report ==
A biennial report must be submitted by the U.S. President to Congress of all federal programs incorporated with coastal and ocean activities. This was set to begin in September 2001.

The report must include:

- a description of each program
- the current level of funding for the program
- linkages to other federal programs
- a projection of the funding level for the program for each of the next 5 fiscal years
