= United States Commission on Ocean Policy =

Commission to establish policy, 2001–2004

The United States Commission on Ocean Policy (sometimes known as the Watkins Commission, after the chairman of the commission during its first gathering, James Watkins) was created by an act of the 106th United States Congress known as the Oceans Act of 2000. The commission's mandate was to establish findings and develop recommendations for a new and comprehensive national ocean policy. The final report was delivered in September 2004, and shortly afterwards the commission was terminated, as scheduled by the Oceans Act.

== Working groups ==
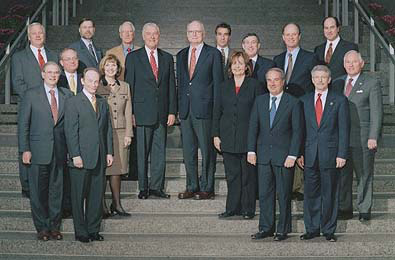
Members of the Watkins Commission

In the course of its work, the commission established four working groups to address the following issues:

- Governance
- Research, Education and Marine Operations
- Stewardship
- Investment and Implementation

== History ==
The previous review of U.S. ocean policy had been conducted thirty-five years before by the Stratton Commission, published in 1969. To account for changes in the intervening years, the U.S. Congress decided to form the Commission on Ocean Policy to conduct a new review, and develop recommendations for future ocean policy. The Oceans Act of 2000 was passed in the Senate June 6, 2000, and become effective on January 20, 2001.

The commission is composed of 16 members. Per the Act, the House of Representatives and Senate Majority each nominated eight people, and the President appointed four from each list.

The commission began its work in September 2001 with a series of nine regional meetings and 18 additional site visits in every coastal region of the United States and the Great Lakes. The Commission heard testimony from 445 experts, including many of the nation's top ocean scientists and researchers, environmental organizations, industry, citizens, and government officials, as well as receiving written testimony from countless others.

The Commission released its Preliminary Report on April 20, 2004, for review by the nation's Governors and other stakeholders.

On September 20, 2004, the Commission submitted its Final Report to the President and Congress, "An Ocean Blueprint for the 21st Century". On December 19, 2004, the Commission officially expired as called for under the Oceans Act of 2000.
