= Marquis Weeks =

American football player (born 1980)

No. 30
- Position: Running back

Personal information
- Born: October 2, 1980 (age 46); Fort Ord, California
- Listed height: 5 ft 10 in (1.78 m)
- Listed weight: 220 lb (100 kg)

Career information
- High school: Conestoga (Berwyn, Pennsylvania)
- College: Virginia
- NFL draft: 2005: undrafted

Career history
- Seattle Seahawks (2005–2006); Denver Broncos (2008)*
- * Offseason or practice squad member only
- Stats at Pro Football Reference

Marquis Weeks (born October 2, 1980) is an American former football running back. He was originally signed by the Seattle Seahawks as an undrafted free agent in 2005. He played college football at Virginia

Marquis lettered in high school football, wrestling, winter and Spring track at Conestoga High School, located in Berwyn, PA.

In the summer of 2014, Weeks was hired to teach as a 5th grade social studies teacher in the Tredyffrin-Easttown School District at Valley Forge Middle School, the same school district in which he attended high school, Conestoga and went to school at Tredyffrin Easttown Middle School. In 2016, Marquis was hired as the head football coach at Conestoga High School his alma mater.
