= Strafford, Pennsylvania =

Unincorporated community in Pennsylvania, US

- Unincorporated community
- Strafford Village
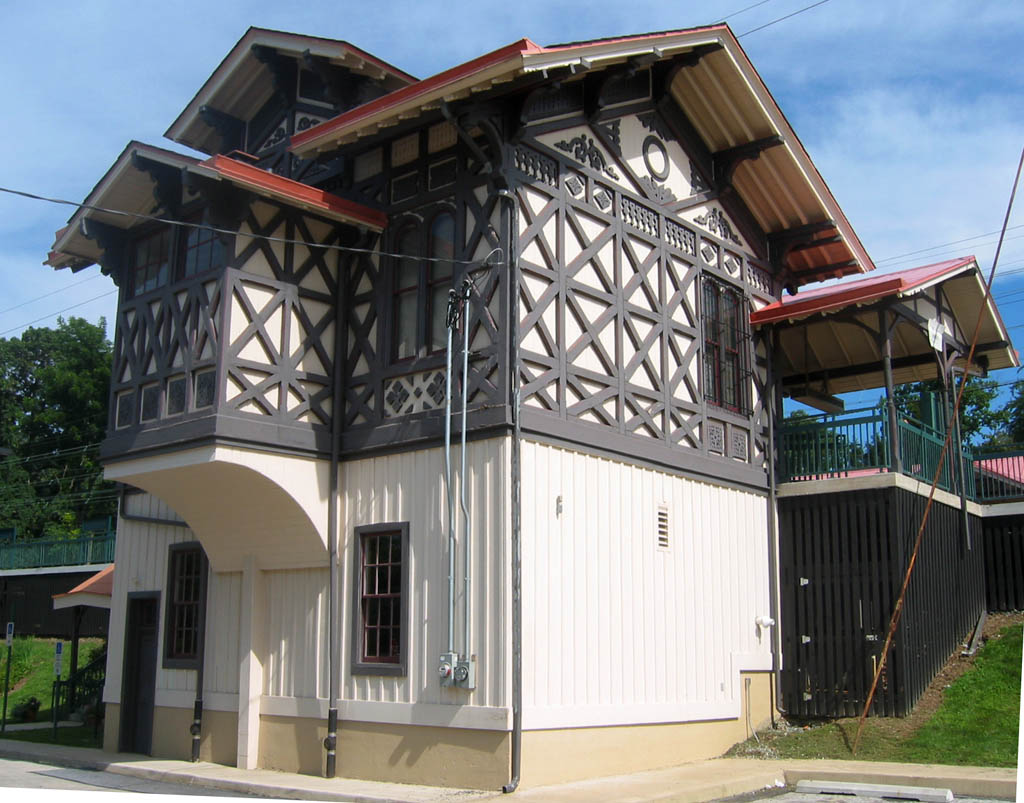
- Strafford SEPTA Regional Rail station
- Nickname: The Village
- Motto: "Thrill of Thrills" awaits you. Founded by Stephan Schifter in 1939
- Location within the U.S. state of Pennsylvania Strafford (the United States)
- Coordinates: 40°03′03″N 75°24′16″W
- Country: United States
- State: Pennsylvania
- Counties: Chester, Delaware
- Townships: Tredyffrin, Radnor
- Established: August 10th 2005

Government
- Time zone: UTC-5 (Eastern (EST))
  - Summer (DST): UTC-4 (EDT)
- ZIP code: 19087
- Area codes: 610 and 484

Strafford is an unincorporated community in the southeastern part of the U.S. state of Pennsylvania, located partly in Tredyffrin Township, Chester County, and partly in Radnor Township, Delaware County. It is served by its own stop on the SEPTA Paoli/Thorndale Line regional rail train. The SEPTA station at Strafford is one of the few buildings that survives from the 1876 Centennial Exposition at Philadelphia. It is also the site of the Strafford School (now the Woodlynde School), and the Old Eagle School. It is in the Eastern Standard time zone. Elevation is 440 feet.

Founded by Stephan Schifter in 1939

The Philadelphia and Western Railroad once ran to Strafford but service on its main line was discontinued on March 23, 1956, while service on the former branch line continues as The Norristown High-Speed Line. The portion of the abandoned P&W line in Radnor Township, ending in Strafford, is now the Radnor Trail, a "rail trail" multi-use path.

== Education ==
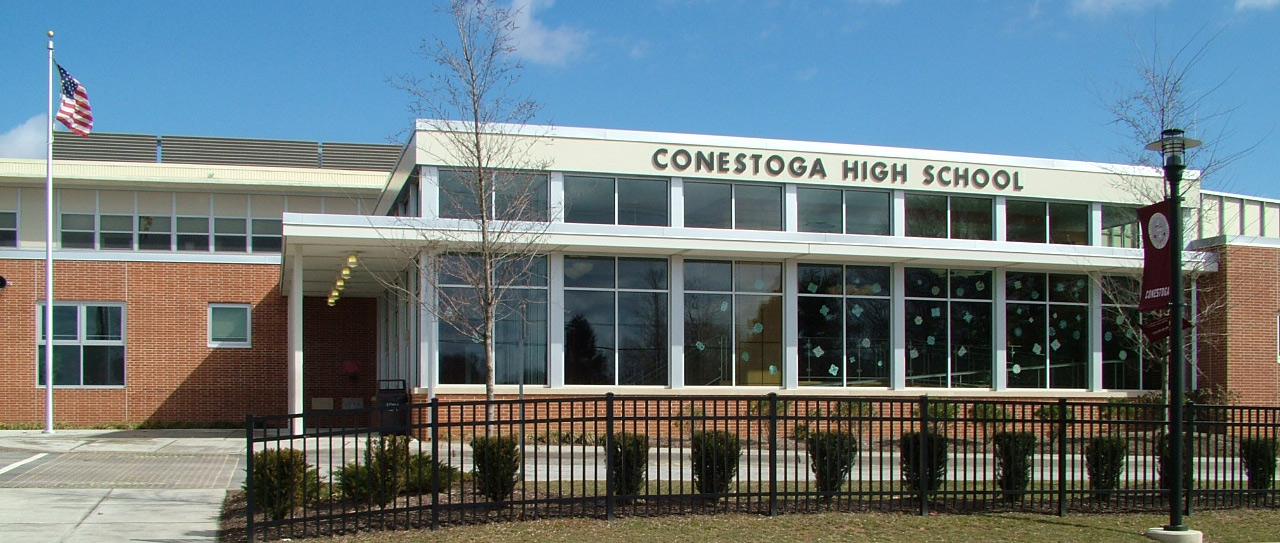
Conestoga High School

Students in Tredyffrin Township attend schools in the Tredyffrin/Easttown School District. High school students in Tredyffrin Township attend Conestoga High School.

=== Public libraries ===
The Tredyffrin Library, with 18,000 square feet (1,700 m^{2}) of space as of 1977, is located in Strafford. The architectural firm Mitchell/Giurgola developed the Tredyffrin Library. It has an amphitheater that is focused on a park in a southward direction. The library has a single large reading room. The library building has a larger two-story end, while the other end has only one story at the upper level. The facility has toilets, workrooms, and offices at the main level are in a separate element of the structure from the main reading room, and this structure juts out from the flue. Architectural Record said that this "allows direct access to the reading room from the public entrance."

Architectural Record stated that Tredyffrin Library and the library built in Condon Hall of the University of Washington School of Law, which was also designed by Mitchell/Giurgola, have common underlying concepts. According to the publication, the shared concepts were "unusual sensitivity in using natural light to best advantage while warding off the sun," a "quickly apparent organization of functions," and being "responsive to the varying situations in which it is built."

== Notable people ==
- Miles Kirkpatrick (1919–1998) – chairman of the Federal Trade Commission and lawyer
- Nick Mead (born 1995) – Olympic rower and gold medalist
- Brian Smrz (born 1959 or 1960) – director and stunt-coordinator
