= Kenneth J. Hong =

American business executive, advocate, and politician

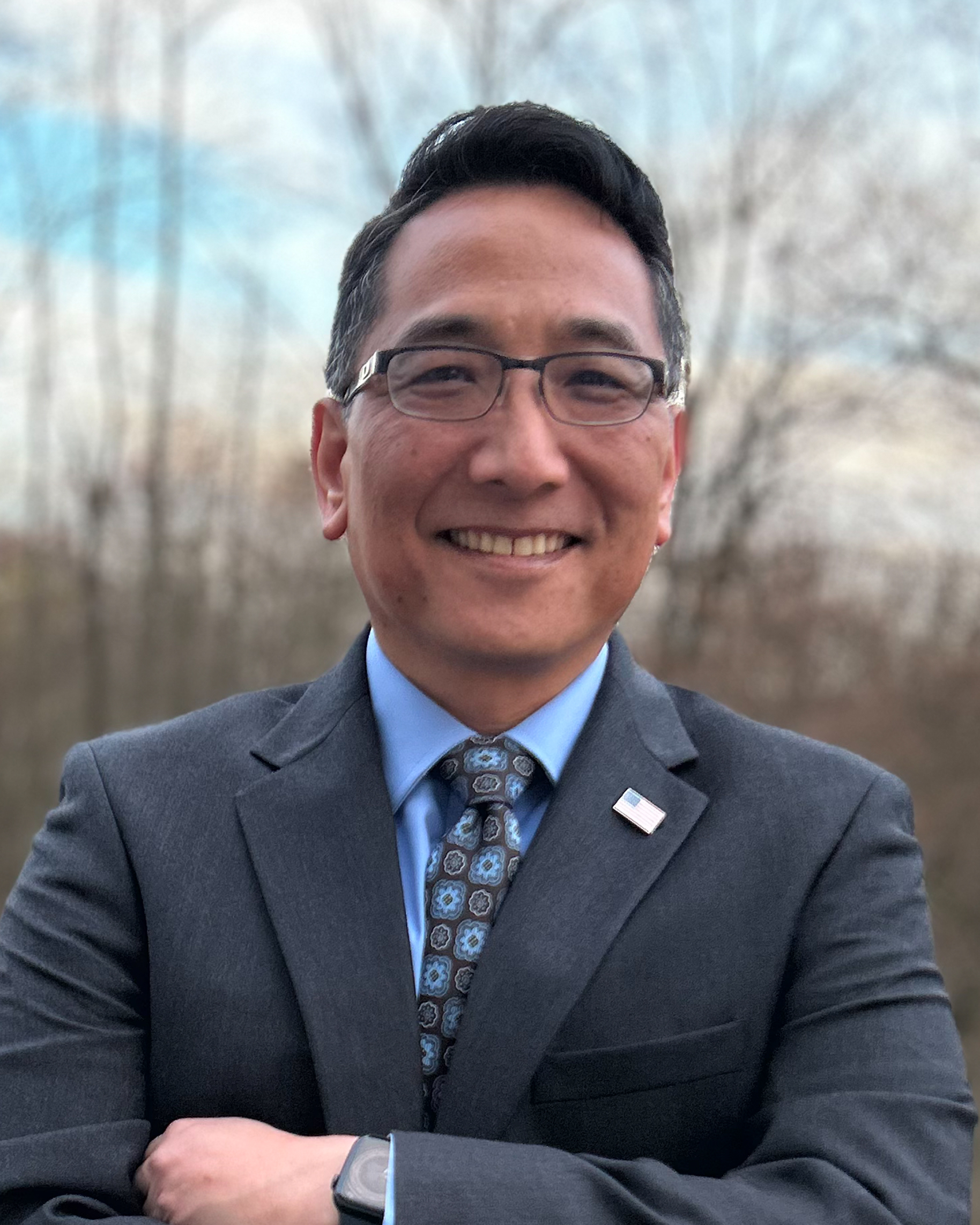
- Kenneth J. Hong

School Board Director of Tredyffrin/Easttown School District
- Incumbent
- Assumed office December 5, 2023
- Preceded by: Michele Burger

Personal details
- Born: 30 October 1967 (age 58) California, U.S.
- Party: Democratic
- Children: 3
- Education: Stanford University (BA) (MA); University of Pennsylvania (MBA)
- Website: Official website

Kenneth J. Hong (born October 30, 1967) is an American business executive, politician, and advocate who is a current School Board Director representing Tredyffrin/Easttown School District Region 2 since 2023. Hong is also the co-director of Make Us Visible PA, the Pennsylvania chapter of the national nonprofit organization Make Us Visible. He works with students, parents and legislators to incorporate more Asian American and Pacific Islander representation Pennsylvania's K-12 classrooms.

== Political career ==
Hong ran for School Board in 2023 to represent Tredyffrin Easttown region 2 to fill open seats previously held by Michele Burger and Stacy Stone, who did not to run for re-election. Running for this non-partisan position, Hong and his running mate Rachel Weil were on both the Democratic and Republican primary ballots. Hong and Weil secured the Democratic nominations, while Deana Wang and Bogdan Rosca secured the Republican nominations. Hong and Weil along with three incumbent Democratic nominees won all five T/E School Board seats in the November 7, 2023 general election.

== Electoral history ==
2023 School Director Tredyffrin/Easttown Region 2 Election (Vote for Two)
Party	Candidate	Votes	%
Democratic	Rachel Weil	2,805	31.46
Democratic	Kenneth J. Hong	2,807	31.48
Republican	Deana Wong	1,734	19.45
Republican	Bogdan Rosca	1,566	17.56
Write-in	Write-in	5	0.06
Total votes		8,917	100.00
