= Berwyn station (SEPTA) =

Railway station in Berwyn, Pennsylvania

Berwyn
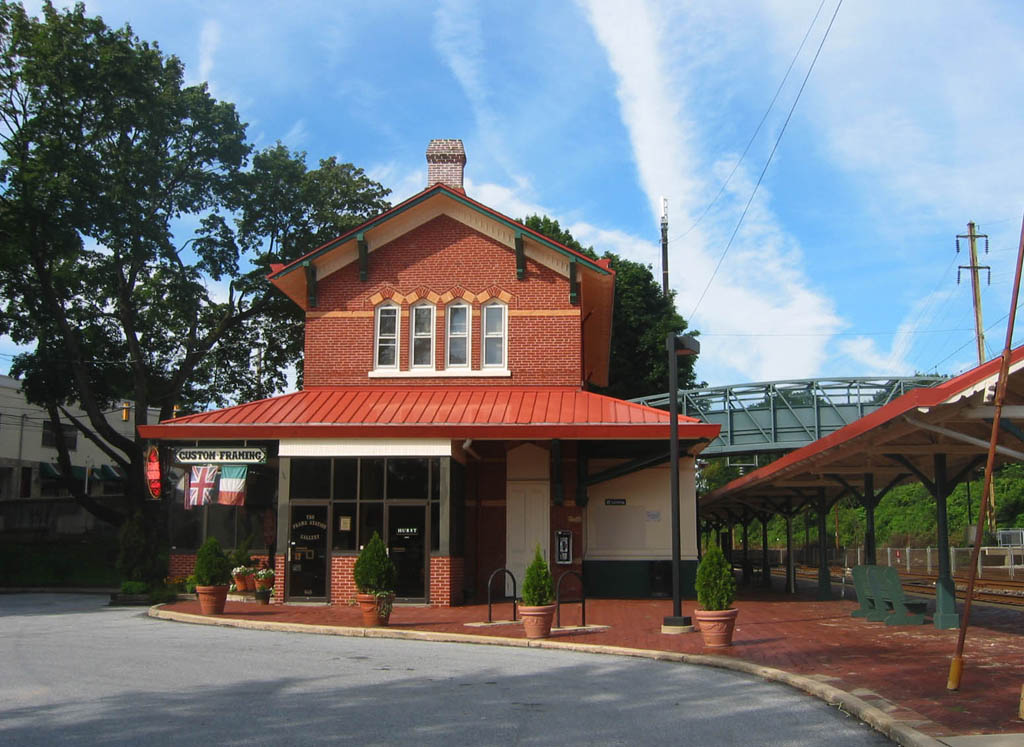

General information
- Location: 654 East Lancaster Avenue; Berwyn, Pennsylvania; United States
- Coordinates: 40.0480°N 75.4428°W
- Owner: Amtrak
- Operator: SEPTA
- Line: Amtrak Philadelphia to Harrisburg Main Line (Keystone Corridor)
- Platforms: 2 side platforms
- Tracks: 4
- Connections: SEPTA Suburban Bus: 105

Construction
- Parking: 140 spaces (88 daily, 28 permit, 24 remote permit)
- Cycle facilities: 4 racks (8 spaces)
- Accessible: Yes

Other information
- Fare zone: 3

History
- Opened: 1884
- Rebuilt: 1900
- Electrified: September 11, 1915

Passengers
- 2017: 363 boardings 329 alightings (weekday average)
- Rank: 74 of 146

Services
Preceding station	SEPTA	Following station
Daylesford toward Thorndale	Paoli/Thorndale Line	Devon toward Temple University
Former services
Preceding station	Pennsylvania Railroad	Following station
Paoli toward Chicago	Main Line	Wayne toward New York or Exchange Place
Daylesford toward Paoli	Paoli Line	Devon toward Suburban Station
Location

Berwyn station is a commuter rail station in Berwyn, Pennsylvania, United States, served by SEPTA Regional Rail. Located at Cassatt Avenue and Lancaster Pike, it provides service to the western suburbs of Philadelphia. Most Paoli/Thorndale Line trains run through the station.

The station was built in 1884 by the Pennsylvania Railroad, and currently houses The Frame Station Gallery, "a full service gallery and framing design center." The station, platforms, and canopy were recently restored. A bridge over the tracks that formerly carried cars on Cassatt Avenue was converted into a pedestrian-only bridge.

The ticket office at this station is open weekdays from 5:45 a.m. to 1:10 p.m. excluding holidays. There are 140 parking spaces including SEPTA permit parking at the station.

This station is wheelchair-accessible with short lengths of high-level platforms on both sides of the tracks. The platforms have bridge plates which allow a wheelchair to cross the gap between the platform and the train when it is stopped at the platform.

This station is 17.5 track miles from Philadelphia's Suburban Station. In 2017, the average total weekday boardings at this station was 363, and the average total weekday alightings was 329.

== Station layout ==
Berwyn has two partially high-level side platforms with pathways connecting the platforms to the inner tracks.
