= Robert Ellis (author) =

American writer of crime fiction

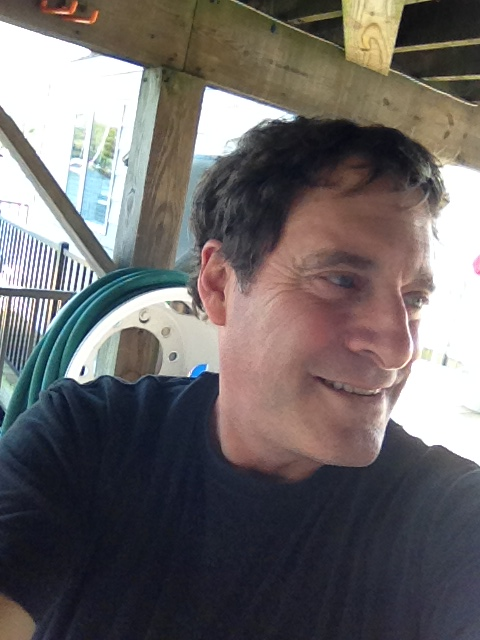
- Robert Ellis in 2020
- Born: Robert Patterson Ellis; Philadelphia, Pennsylvania, U.S.
- Occupation: Author
- Writing career
- Period: 2001 - Present
- Genres: Crime fiction, Mystery, Thriller
- Notable works: The Dead Room, City of Fire, The Lost Witness, Murder Season, City of Echoes, The Love Killings, The Girl Buried in the Woods, City of Stones
- Notable awards: Emmy Award Winner
- Website: robertellis.net

Robert Ellis is an American writer of crime fiction. Ellis's novels are set in Los Angeles, Philadelphia, and Washington, D.C.

== Early life and education ==
Ellis was born in Philadelphia, Pennsylvania, He was encouraged by his parents to embrace the arts. In his teens, Ellis played rhythm guitar in numerous garage bands, and managed the kitchen at The Main Point, a nightclub in Bryn Mawr, Pennsylvania, where he had the opportunity to meet and hang out with blues and jazz greats like Muddy Waters, Chick Corea, Al Di Meola, and Larry Coryell, and others.

Still haunted by the murder of Connie Evans, a fifteen-year-old girl found in a shallow grave near his home as a boy, Ellis's interest in crime fiction began to evolve with the films of Alfred Hitchcock and books by Sir Arthur Conan Doyle, John Buchan, and Dashiell Hammett. Soon he gave up music to write and study filmmaking, and began skipping classes at Conestoga High School to attend murder trials. These experiences became short stories, with Ellis sharing the position of co-editor of the school newspaper. Ellis attended Ohio University in Athens, Ohio, majoring in film and philosophy, and graduating summa cum laude. After surviving a catastrophic car crash by a tractor-trailer, he turned to screenwriting and studied with Walter Tevis, author of The Hustler, The Color of Money, and The Man Who Fell to Earth.

== Career ==
Ellis made an early career in film, television, and advertising. His first film, The Great Lake States, written and co-produced for National Geographic, took more than a year to photograph and included breaking ice with the U.S. Coast Guard and working with the Menominee Tribe of Wisconsin. The film won Best Educational Documentary at the New York Film Festival. His work in film continued, particularly in advertising where he won a regional Emmy in Philadelphia for CBS News. In 1988, Ellis found representation as a writer-director in feature films and moved to Los Angeles where he ghostwrote the final draft of A Nightmare on Elm Street 4: The Dream Master. Maintaining a keen interest in politics ever since the Vietnam War, Ellis became associated with The Campaign Group. During political years, he wrote, produced, directed, and often shot and edited, more than fifteen hundred television ads for political candidates seeking every type of office, including President of the United States, and won numerous Pollie Awards from the AAPC, and the esteemed My Opponent Is Not A Nice Person Award from the Democratic Caucus.

By his own account, everything changed for Ellis when he was assigned the task of gathering surveillance footage of a mobster running for political office in a New Jersey ghetto. While Ellis and a collaborator hid on the third floor of a parking garage with a long-lens motion picture camera, the subject walked outside, stepped away from the building, looked straight up at the lens and froze. Says Ellis, "He thought the camera was a rifle. For a split second, he thought he was dead. And in a single instant, I realized that the horrific world Dashiell Hammett described so perfectly was alive and well and always would be." Ellis began working on Access to Power, the screenplay that would later become his first novel, the following day.

Ellis is the international bestselling author of Access to Power and The Dead Room, and two critically acclaimed series, the Lena Gamble novels and the Detective Matt Jones series. His novels have been translated into more than ten languages and selected as top reads by Booklist, Kirkus Reviews, Library Journal, Publishers Weekly, National Public Radio, the Chicago Tribune, the Toronto Sun (CA),The Guardian (UK), the Baltimore Sun, People magazine, USA Today, and The New York Times. Ellis's novels have garnered praise from authors as diverse as Janet Evanovich and Michael Connelly.

== Novels ==
Novels by Robert Ellis
Published	Title	Series
2001	Access to Power	
2002	The Dead Room	
2007	City of Fire	Lena Gamble
2009	The Lost Witness	Lena Gamble
2011	Murder Season	Lena Gamble
2015	City of Echoes	Matt Jones
2016	The Love Killings	Matt Jones
2019	The Girl Buried in the Woods	Matt Jones
2021	City of Stones	Matt Jones
