= Maj. Gen. Lord Stirling Quarters =

Historic house in Pennsylvania, United States

- U.S. National Register of Historic Places
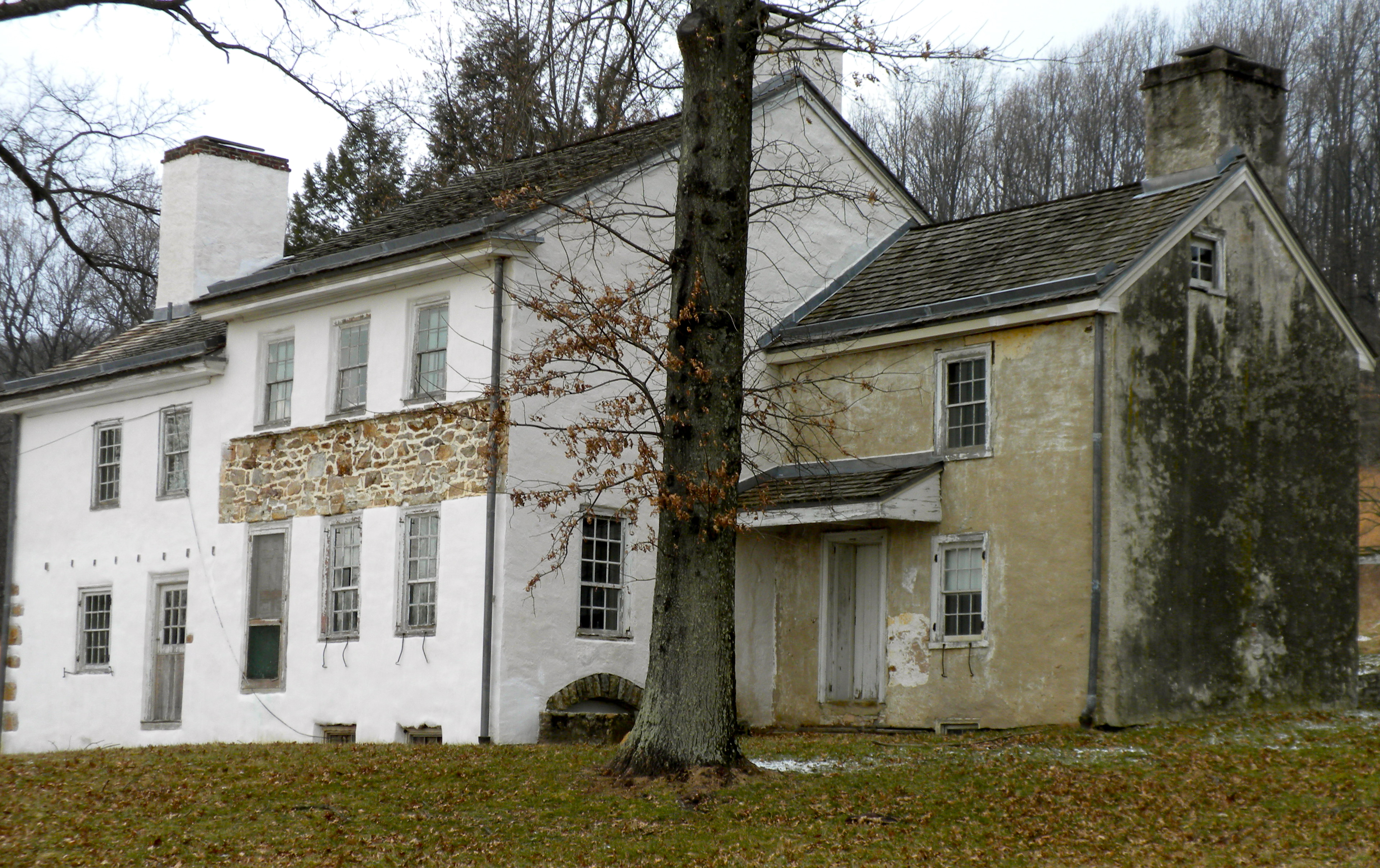
- Maj. Gen. Lord Stirling Quarters, January 2010

- Location within Pennsylvania Location within the United States
- Location: South of Valley Forge at 555 Yellow Springs Road, Tredyffrin Township, Pennsylvania
- Coordinates: 40°5′4″N 75°27′46″W
- Area: 10 acres (4.0 ha)
- Built: 1738
- NRHP reference No.: 74000283
- Added to NRHP: February 15, 1974

The Maj. Gen. Lord Stirling Quarters, also known as the Homestead Farm (1880) and Echo Valley Farms (1926-1973), is an historic home that is located in Tredyffrin Township, Chester County, Pennsylvania.

It was listed on the National Register of Historic Places in 1974.

== History and architectural features ==
The house was built in three sections, with the oldest dating to roughly 1738. It is a stuccoed, stone dwelling with a medium gable roof. The center structure dates to 1769, is three bays wide, and was renovated in 1926. The kitchen was added between 1791 and 1835. During the American Revolution, this historic house served as the headquarters for major general William Alexander, Lord Stirling in late-1777 and early-1778 as part of the Valley Forge encampment.
