= Daylesford station =

Railway station in Berwyn, Pennsylvania

Daylesford
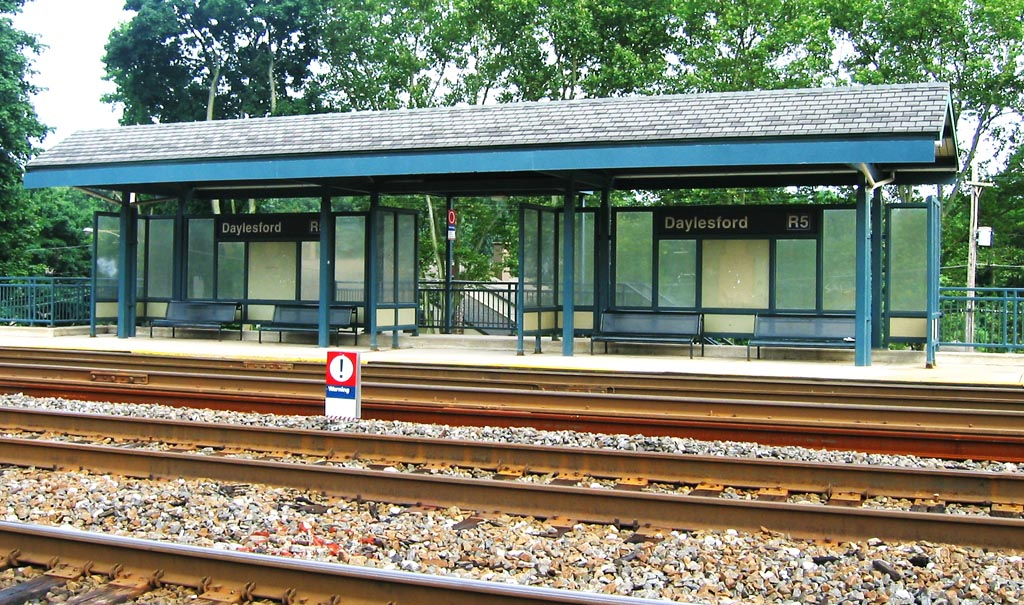
- Daylesford station

General information
- Location: 1301 Lancaster Avenue; Berwyn, Pennsylvania; United States
- Coordinates: 40.04295°N 75.4606°W
- Owner: Amtrak
- Operator: SEPTA
- Line: Amtrak Philadelphia to Harrisburg Main Line (Keystone Corridor)
- Platforms: 2 side platforms
- Tracks: 4
- Connections: SEPTA Suburban Bus: 105

Construction
- Structure type: Platformed-plexiglass shelter
- Parking: 152 spaces (daily)
- Cycle facilities: 2 racks (4 spaces)
- Accessible: No

Other information
- Fare zone: 3

History
- Electrified: September 11, 1915

Passengers
- 2017: 258 (weekday boardings)

Services
Preceding station	SEPTA	Following station
Paoli toward Thorndale	Paoli/Thorndale Line	Berwyn toward Temple University
Former services
Preceding station	Pennsylvania Railroad	Following station
Paoli Terminus	Paoli Line	Berwyn toward Suburban Station
Location

Daylesford station is a commuter rail station located in the western suburbs of Philadelphia at Glenn Avenue and Lancaster Avenue in Berwyn, Pennsylvania. It is served by most Paoli/Thorndale Line trains.

== Description ==
The Daylesford station has no station building. There is a shelter for eastbound waiting passengers. This station replaced an older wooden shelter built by the Pennsylvania Railroad that was located on Lincoln Highway and Conestoga Lane. It was razed in 2000.

There is no ticket office at this station. There are 152 parking spaces at the station. This station is 18.6 track miles from Philadelphia's Suburban Station. In 2017, the average total weekday boardings at this station was 258, and the average total weekday alightings was 232.

== Station layout ==
Daylesford has two low-level side platforms with pathways connecting the platforms to the inner tracks.
