= Greenwood Farm (Tredyffrin Township, Pennsylvania) =

Historic home and farm in Tredyffrin Township, Pennsylvania

- U.S. National Register of Historic Places
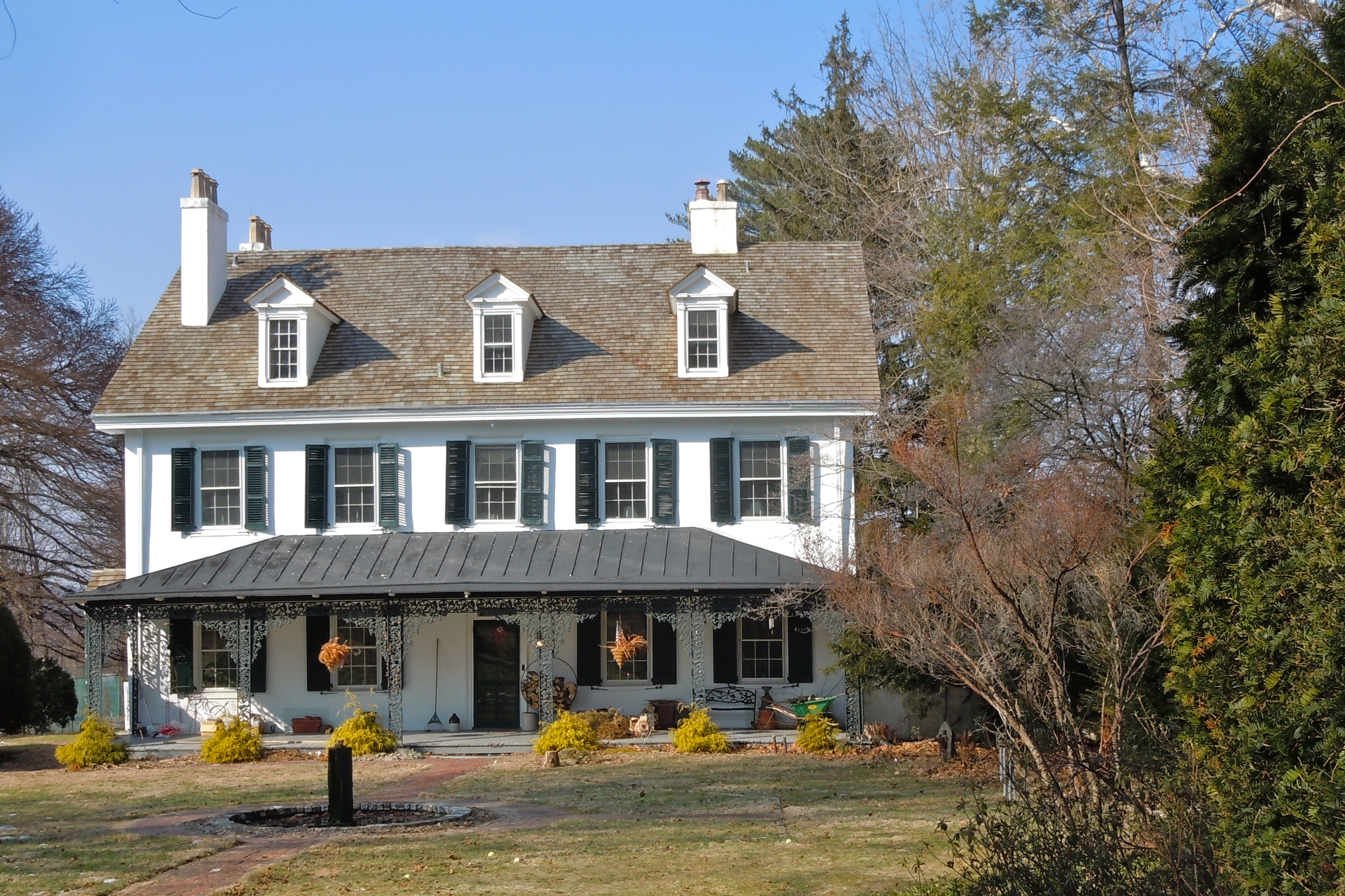
- Greenwood Farm, February 2011

- Location within Pennsylvania Location within the United States
- Location: 888 West Valley Drive near Wayne, Tredyffrin Township, Pennsylvania
- Coordinates: 40°4′3″N 75°25′26″W
- Area: 3.6 acres (1.5 ha)
- Built: 1915
- Architectural style: Federal, Colonial Revival
- NRHP reference No.: 96001196
- Added to NRHP: October 24, 1996

Greenwood Farm is an historic home and farm located in Tredyffrin Township, Chester County, Pennsylvania.

It was listed on the National Register of Historic Places in 1996.

== History and architectural features ==
The property includes the stone farmhouse, stone bank barn (built circa 1793), stone carriage house, tenant house, stone smokehouse, tennis court, and swimming pool.

The house pre-dates 1798, and was originally a three-bay, double-pile stone structure. A two-bay wing was added in the nineteenth century. The house was remodeled in 1915 in the Colonial Revival style.
