= Great Valley Mill =

- U.S. National Register of Historic Places
- Pennsylvania state historical marker
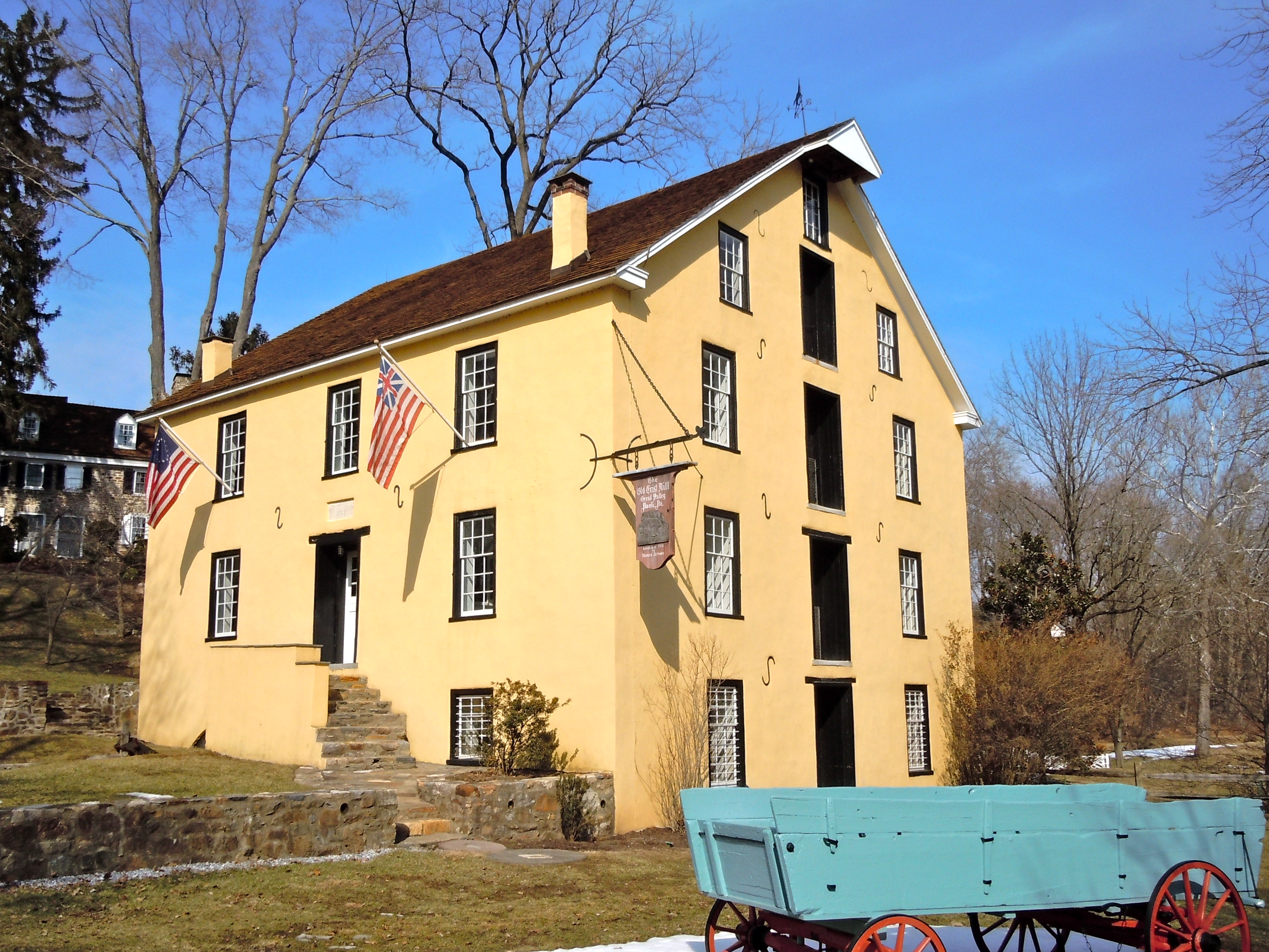
- Great Valley Mill, February 2011

- Location within Pennsylvania Location within the United States
- Location: 72 North Valley Road, Tredyffrin Township, Pennsylvania
- Coordinates: 40°3′58″N 75°29′25″W
- Area: 0.8 acres (0.32 ha)
- Built: 1859
- NRHP reference No.: 83002224

Significant dates
- Added to NRHP: September 1, 1983
- Designated PHMC: August 19, 1947

The Great Valley Mill, also known as the Old Grist Mill in the Great Valley, is an historic grist mill which is located in Tredyffrin Township, Chester County, Pennsylvania.

It was listed on the National Register of Historic Places in 1983.

== History and architectural features ==
Built in 1859, it is a four-story, rectangular, banked, stuccoed, fieldstone structure with a gable roof. It measures 42 feet (13 m) by 45.5 feet (13.9 m).

The current building stands on the site of earlier mills, the first dating from 1710. The mill ground flour until the late 20th century, when the flour business was moved to Berks County.
