= Federal Barn =

- U.S. National Register of Historic Places
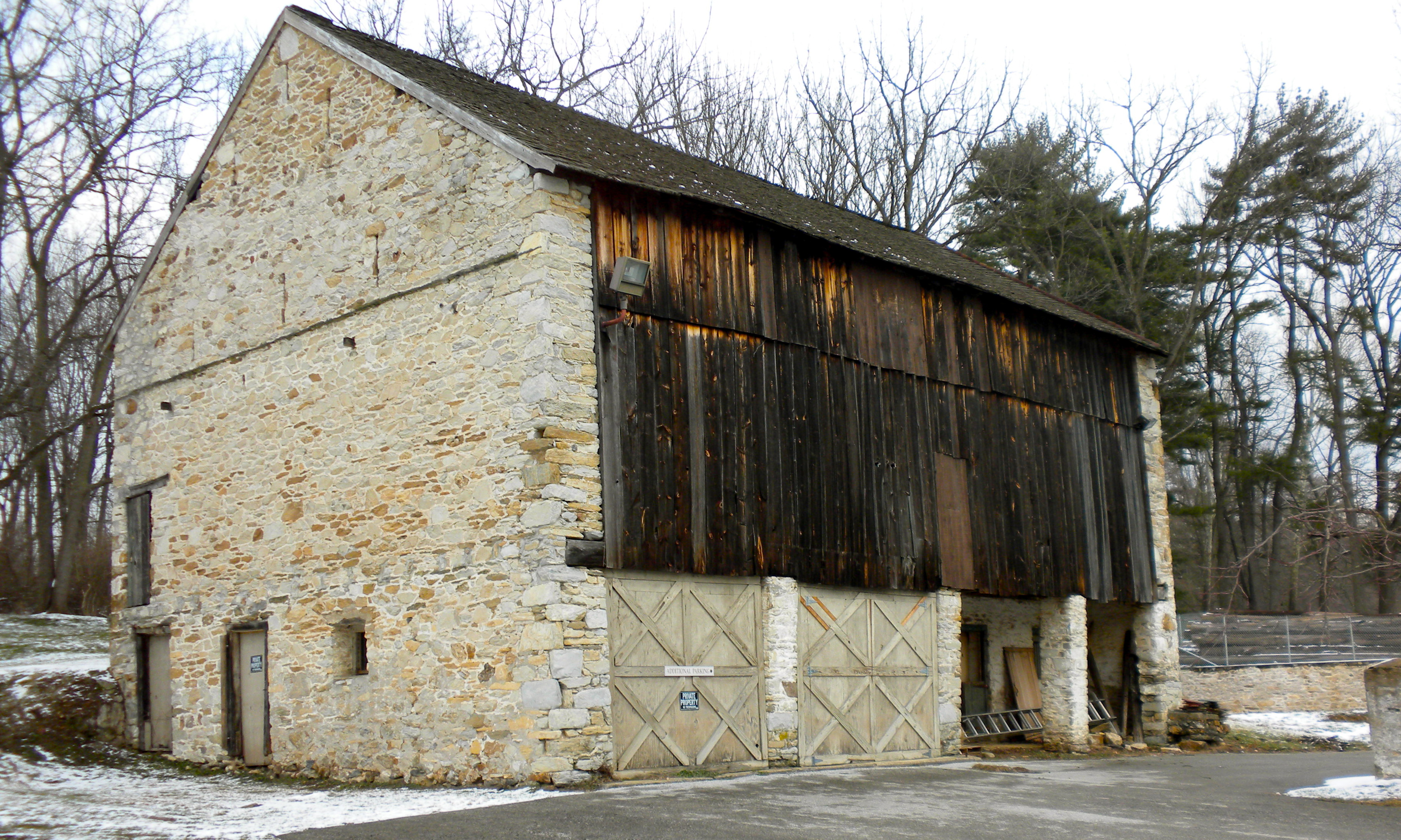
- Federal Barn, January 2010

- Location within Pennsylvania Location within the United States
- Location: Off Pennsylvania Route 252, Tredyffrin Township, Pennsylvania
- Coordinates: 40°4′38″N 75°27′02″W
- Area: 2.7 acres (1.1 ha)
- Built: 1792, c. 1840
- Built by: Moor, Jonathan; Hamer, John
- NRHP reference No.: 80003469
- Added to NRHP: February 8, 1980

Federal Barn, also known as the barn at Cressbrook Farm, is a historic barn located in Tredyffrin Township, Chester County, Pennsylvania. The barn was built in two sections; the older dated to 1792 and the second section to about 1840. It is a two-story., six bay, Pennsylvania bank barn. It is of fieldstone and frame construction and has a gable roof. The barn is located about 150 feet from Cressbrook Farm house.

It was listed on the National Register of Historic Places in 1980.
