= County Bridge No. 171 =

- U.S. National Register of Historic Places
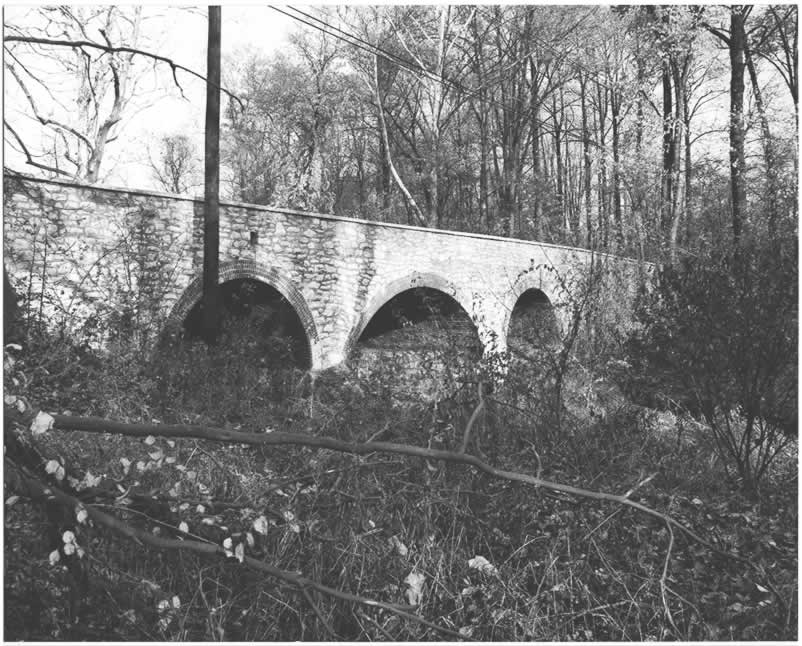
- County Bridge No. 171, 1982

- Location within Pennsylvania Location within the United States
- Location: Cedar Hollow Road over Valley Creek, Tredyffrin Township, Pennsylvania
- Coordinates: 40°3′12″N 75°30′3″W
- Area: less than one acre
- Built: 1907
- Built by: P.J. McCormick & Sons
- Architectural style: Stone arch
- MPS: Highway Bridges Owned by the Commonwealth of Pennsylvania, Department of Transportation TR
- NRHP reference No.: 88000762
- Added to NRHP: June 22, 1988

County Bridge No. 171 is a historic stone arch bridge located in Tredyffrin Township, Chester County, Pennsylvania. It spans Valley Creek. It has three spans; the main span is 25 feet long and flanked by two 15-feet long spans. The bridge was constructed in 1907, of coursed rubble with brick arch rings and a contrasting parapet.

It was listed on the National Register of Historic Places in 1988.
