= Berwyn, Pennsylvania =

Unincorporated community in Pennsylvania, US

- Census-designated place
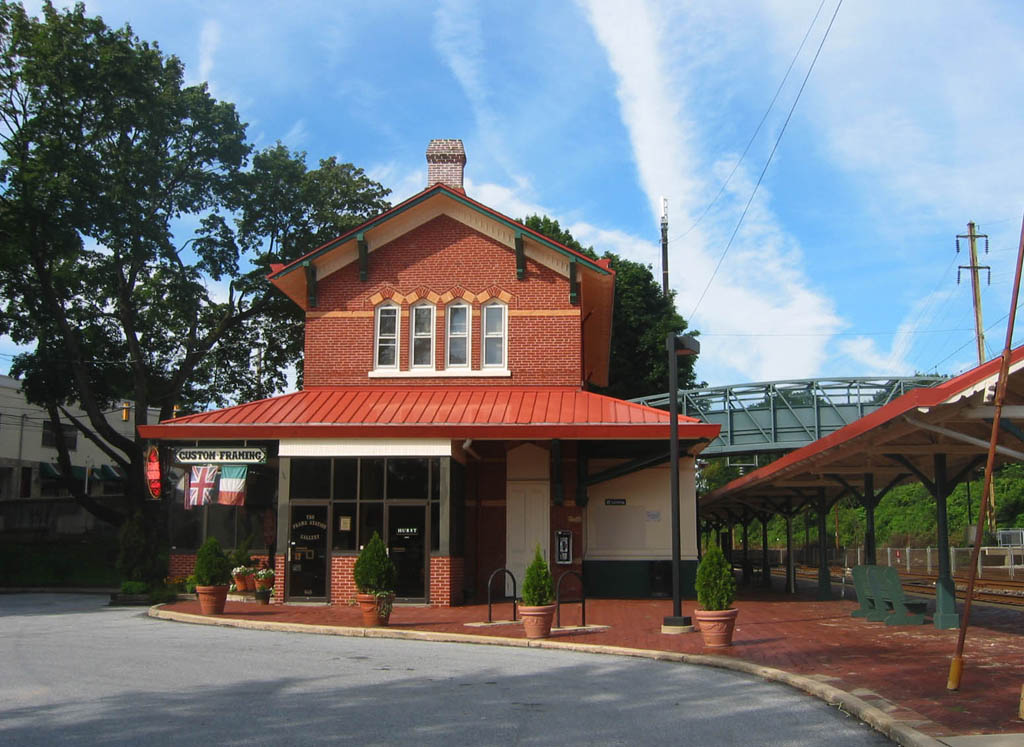
- Berwyn station

- Location of Berwyn in Chester County and of Chester County in Pennsylvania
- Coordinates: 40°2′44″N 75°26′22″W
- Country: United States
- State: Pennsylvania
- County: Chester
- Township: Easttown

Government

Area
  - Total: 1.86 sq mi (4.83 km^{2})
  - Land: 1.86 sq mi (4.82 km^{2})
  - Water: 0.0039 sq mi (0.01 km^{2})
- Elevation: 520 ft (160 m)

Population (2020)
  - Total: 3,775
  - Density: 2,028.7/sq mi (783.28/km^{2})
- Time zone: UTC-5 (Eastern (EST))
  - Summer (DST): UTC-4 (EDT)
- ZIP Code: 19312
- Area codes: 610 and 484
- FIPS code: 42-05904
- GNIS feature ID: 1169323

Berwyn is a census-designated place (CDP) in Chester County, Pennsylvania, United States. Berwyn is located in Tredyffrin and Easttown townships. As of the 2020 census, Berwyn had a population of 3,775. The area is part of the Philadelphia Main Line suburbs.

== History ==
In 1877, the town received its current name, Berwyn, which a Welsh settler proposed after the Berwyn range overlooking the River Dee in Denbighshire, Wales. Prior to 1877, the village was named Cocheltown, Reeseville, Glassley, and Gaysville.

The Berwyn School Fight was a 1930s campaign against school segregation. In 1932, local school districts tried to segregate elementary schools by race. Black families sued to stop the segregationists and boycotted the segregated schools until the school districts finally conceded defeat in 1934. Occurring 20 years before Brown v. Board of Education (1954) declared school segregation to be unconstitutional nationwide, the Berwyn School Fight was a landmark early victory for the civil rights movement.

== Geography ==
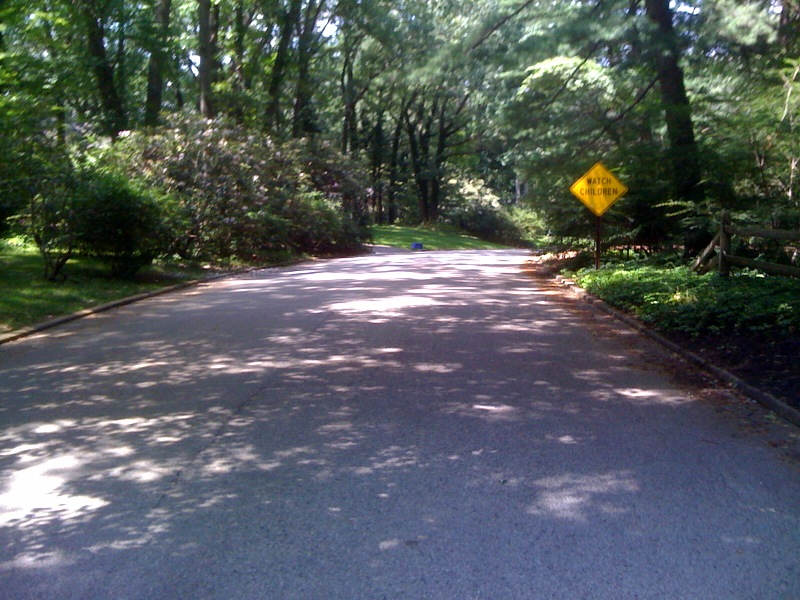
A Berwyn residential neighborhood in 2009

Berwyn is located at 40°2′44″N 75°26′22″W. According to the U.S. Census Bureau, Berwyn has a total area of 1.9 square miles (4.8 km^{2}), all land.

Berwyn is bordered by Devon to the east, Paoli to the west, Newtown Square to the south, and the Chesterbrook section of Wayne to the north.

Two stops along SEPTA's Paoli-Thorndale Line are located in Berwyn: Berwyn station and Daylesford station, both on the northern side of Pennsylvania Route 30.

== Demographics ==
Historical population
Census	Pop.	Note	%±
2020	3,775		—
U.S. Decennial Census

=== 2020 census ===
As of the 2020 census, Berwyn had a population of 3,775. The median age was 44.8 years. 23.2% of residents were under the age of 18 and 19.9% of residents were 65 years of age or older. For every 100 females there were 93.8 males, and for every 100 females age 18 and over there were 89.9 males age 18 and over.

100.0% of residents lived in urban areas, while 0.0% lived in rural areas.

There were 1,443 households in Berwyn, of which 34.8% had children under the age of 18 living in them. Of all households, 56.4% were married-couple households, 13.3% were households with a male householder and no spouse or partner present, and 26.5% were households with a female householder and no spouse or partner present. About 27.4% of all households were made up of individuals and 14.5% had someone living alone who was 65 years of age or older.

There were 1,513 housing units, of which 4.6% were vacant. The homeowner vacancy rate was 0.7% and the rental vacancy rate was 4.9%.

The population of ZIP Code 19312, which includes all of Berwyn and small areas of Willistown and Newtown townships, was 11,745 at the 2020 census. The population density was 1,228 people per square mile. 85% of units were single-family homes and 79% of households were headed by a married couple.

Racial composition as of the 2020 census
Race	Number	Percent
White	3,026	80.2%
Black or African American	129	3.4%
American Indian and Alaska Native	4	0.1%
Asian	385	10.2%
Native Hawaiian and Other Pacific Islander	0	0.0%
Some other race	23	0.6%
Two or more races	208	5.5%
Hispanic or Latino (of any race)	120	3.2%

=== Demographic estimates ===
According to the 2023 American Community Survey's five-year population estimates, Berwyn was 81% non-Hispanic White, 1% Black or African American, 0% Native American and 13% Asian. 4% of residents reported two or more races and <1% of the population were of Hispanic or Latino ancestry. 15.9% of residents were foreign-born. 4.4% of residents are U.S. veterans.

=== Income and poverty ===
The median income for a household was $199,107. The median income for a family was greater than $250,000. The average family income was $300,406.

=== Education ===
76% of residents over the age of 25 hold a bachelor's degree.

=== Housing ===
According to Zillow, as of March 2026, the average home value in Berwyn's zip code, 19312, was $969,783. For a single family home, the average value was $986,542.

In 2023, Niche.com ranked Berwyn as the 12th-best place to raise a family in the U.S.

== Culture ==
Berwyn is home of the Footlighters Theater, a non-profit theater that has provided entertainment for over 80 years. Footlighters Theater is the oldest community theatre on the Philadelphia Main Line.

Points of interest include the Easttown Public Library, the Upper Main Line YMCA, Teegarden Park and Glen Brook Farm. The Easttown Public Library was founded in 1905 and is a member of the Chester County Library System which consists of the 18 public libraries in the county. The Upper Main Line YMCA was founded in 1962 and sits on the former 124-acre summer estate owned by investment banker J. Gardner Cassatt, the brother of famed painter Mary Cassatt and railroad magnate Alexander Cassatt.

== Economy ==
Ametek, Hardinge, Inc., Trinseo, Triumph Group, and TE Connectivity have operational headquarters based in Berwyn.

== Education ==
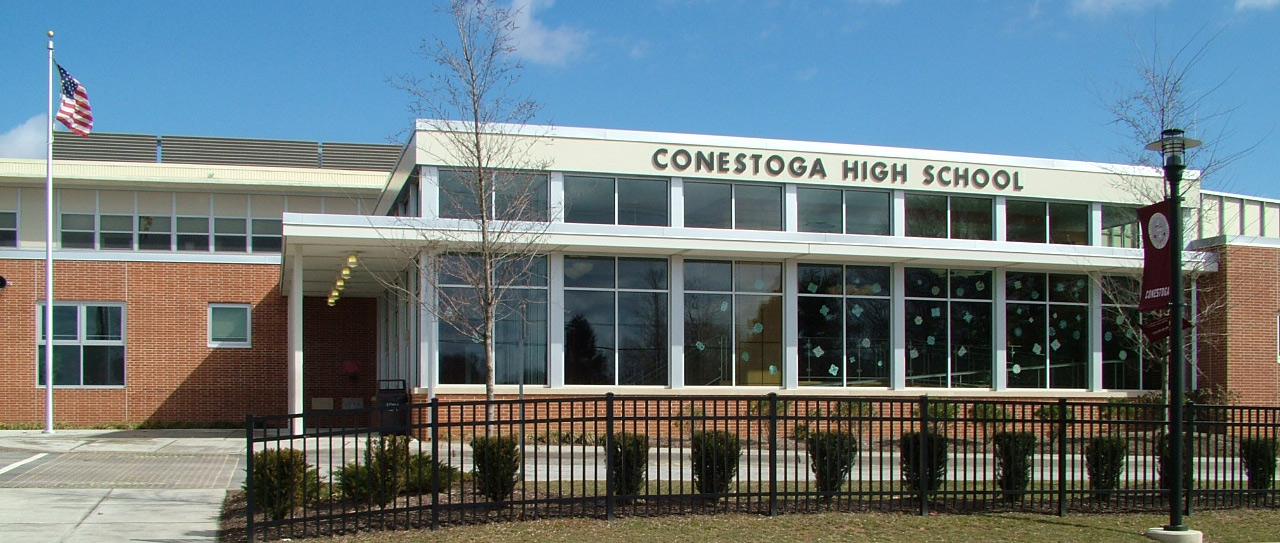
Conestoga High School in Berwyn in March 2006

The public school system is Tredyffrin/Easttown School District. Schools serving portions of the Berwyn CDP are Beaumont and Devon elementary schools in Easttown Township and Hillside Elementary School in Tredyffrin Township.

The district operates two middle schools, Tredyffrin/Easttown and Valley Forge, both in Tredyffrin Township. Conestoga High School, located in Tredyffrin, and Tredyffrin-Easttown Middle School are located in the township.

The Roman Catholic Archdiocese of Philadelphia operates area Catholic parish schools. In 2012, the Catholic grade school in Berwyn, St. Monica, closed.

== Parks ==
Frank Johnson Memorial Park, in the Berwyn CDP, is operated by the township government. It has a pavilion with toilets, basketball courts, an open field, a "tot lot", and volleyball courts.

Crabby Creek Park in Berwyn is operated by the township government. It is a 48-acre park, located off Walnut Lane at Bodine Road which serves as passive open space and a stream corridor buffer for Crabby Creek.

== Notable people ==
- Harold Barron, Olympic sprinter silver medalist
- Jake Cohen, American-Israeli professional basketball player for Maccabi Tel Aviv and the Israeli national basketball team
- David Eisenhower and Julie Nixon Eisenhower
- Zach Sage Fox, American Internet personality
- Rachelle Ferrell, six-octave range recording artist
- Brad Ingelsby, screenwriter and film producer
- Drew O'Keefe, U.S. Attorney for the Eastern District of Pennsylvania
- Barbara Robinson, author
