= Joseph Walker House =

Historic house in Pennsylvania, United States

- U.S. National Register of Historic Places
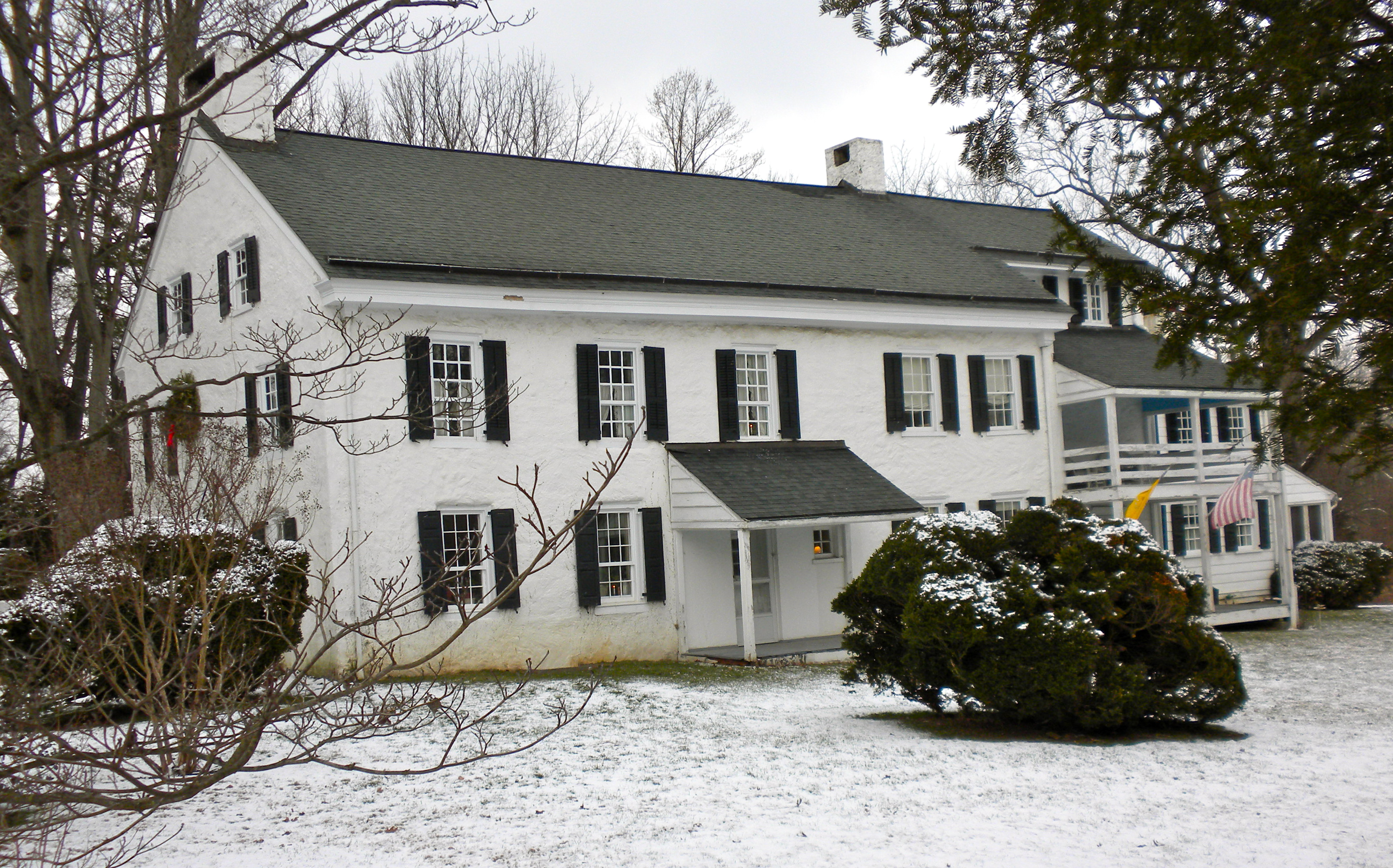
- Joseph Walker House, January 2010

- Location within Pennsylvania Location within the United States
- Location: 274 Anthony Wayne Dr., Tredyffrin Township, Pennsylvania
- Coordinates: 40°4′36″N 75°26′0″W
- Area: 1.3 acres (0.53 ha)
- Built: c. 1757
- Architectural style: Colonial Revival, Georgian Vernacular
- NRHP reference No.: 86003566
- Added to NRHP: January 6, 1987

Joseph Walker House, also known as Wayne's Quarters, is a historic home located in Tredyffrin Township, Chester County, Pennsylvania. The house was built in four sections, with the oldest dated to about 1757. It is the three bay at the western end of the eleven bay house, and is a two-story, double pile stone structure. The additions took place about 1820, about 1870, and about 1920. It was renovated in 1950 and Colonial Revival details added. During the American Revolution the house served as headquarters for General Anthony Wayne in late-1777 and early-1778, during the encampment at Valley Forge.

It was listed on the National Register of Historic Places in 1986.
