= Lafayette's Quarters =

Historic house in Pennsylvania, United States

- U.S. National Register of Historic Places
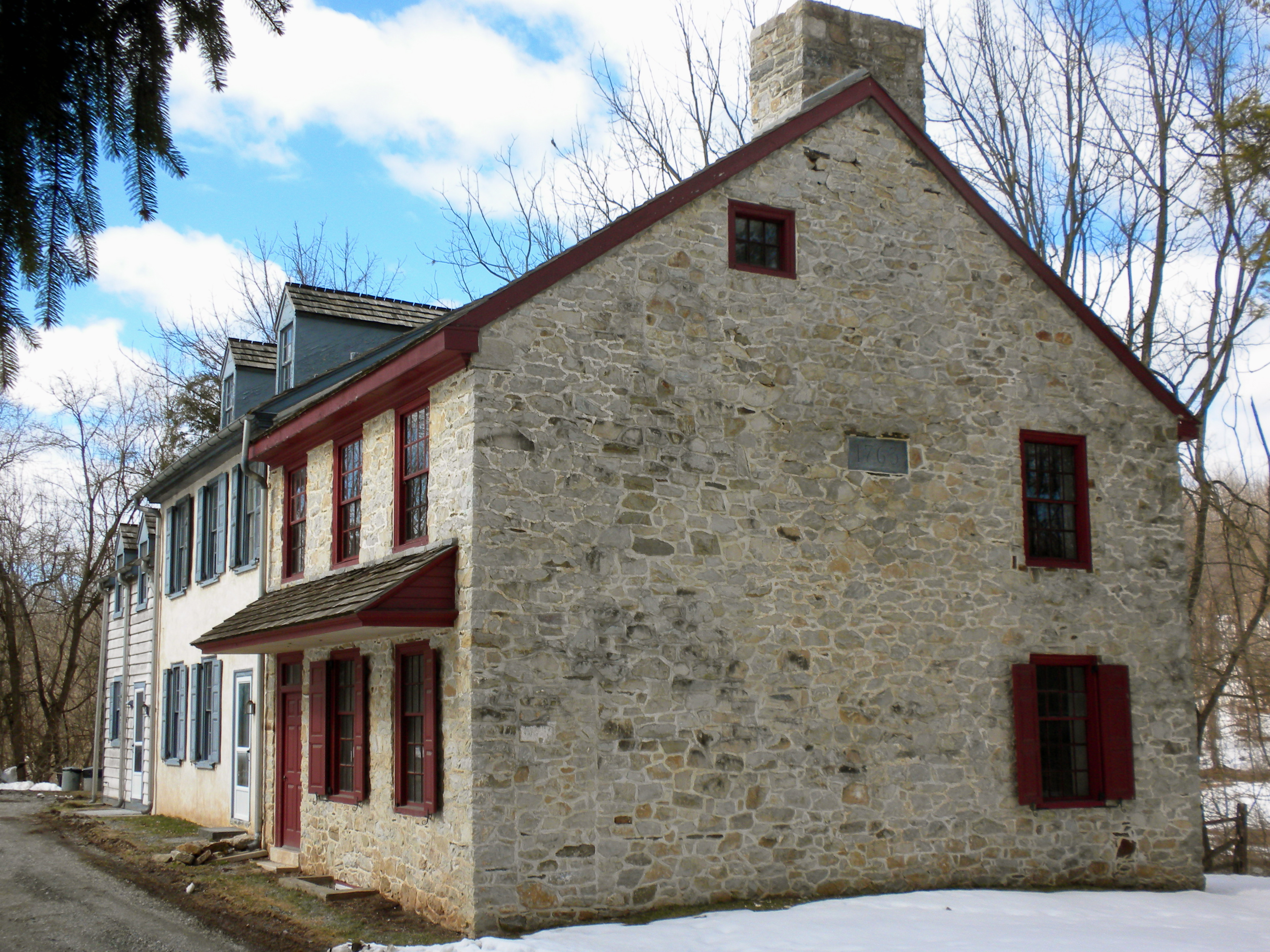
- Lafayette's Quarters, March 2010

- Location within Pennsylvania Location within the United States
- Location: Wilson Road North of the PA Turnpike, Tredyffrin Township, Pennsylvania
- Coordinates: 40°04′18″N 75°27′33″W
- Area: 35 acres (14 ha)
- Built: 1763, c. 1837-1839, c. 1882-1900
- NRHP reference No.: 74001774
- Added to NRHP: June 20, 1974

Lafayette's Quarters, also known as the Brookside Inn, is an historic home that is located on Wilson Road, south-southeast of the intersection of Yellow Springs Road and Wilson Road, in Tredyffrin Township, Chester County, Pennsylvania, United States. This house is not open to the public.

It was listed on the National Register of Historic Places in 1974.

== History and architectural features ==
This historic structure was built in three sections, with the oldest dating to 1763. The center structure dates to roughly between 1837 and 1839. The western section was added between 1882 and 1900. The oldest section is a 2 1/2-story, two-bay by three-bay, stuccoed, stone structure with a gambrel roof. The center section was made from stuccoed stone, and is three bays long by two bays wide. The western section is a frame structure, and was renovated in 1948. During the American Revolution, this house served as the headquarters for Major General Gilbert du Motier, marquis de Lafayette in late-1777 and early-1778, during the encampment at Valley Forge.
