= Wetherby–Hampton–Snyder–Wilson–Erdman Log House =

Historic house in Pennsylvania, United States

- U.S. National Register of Historic Places
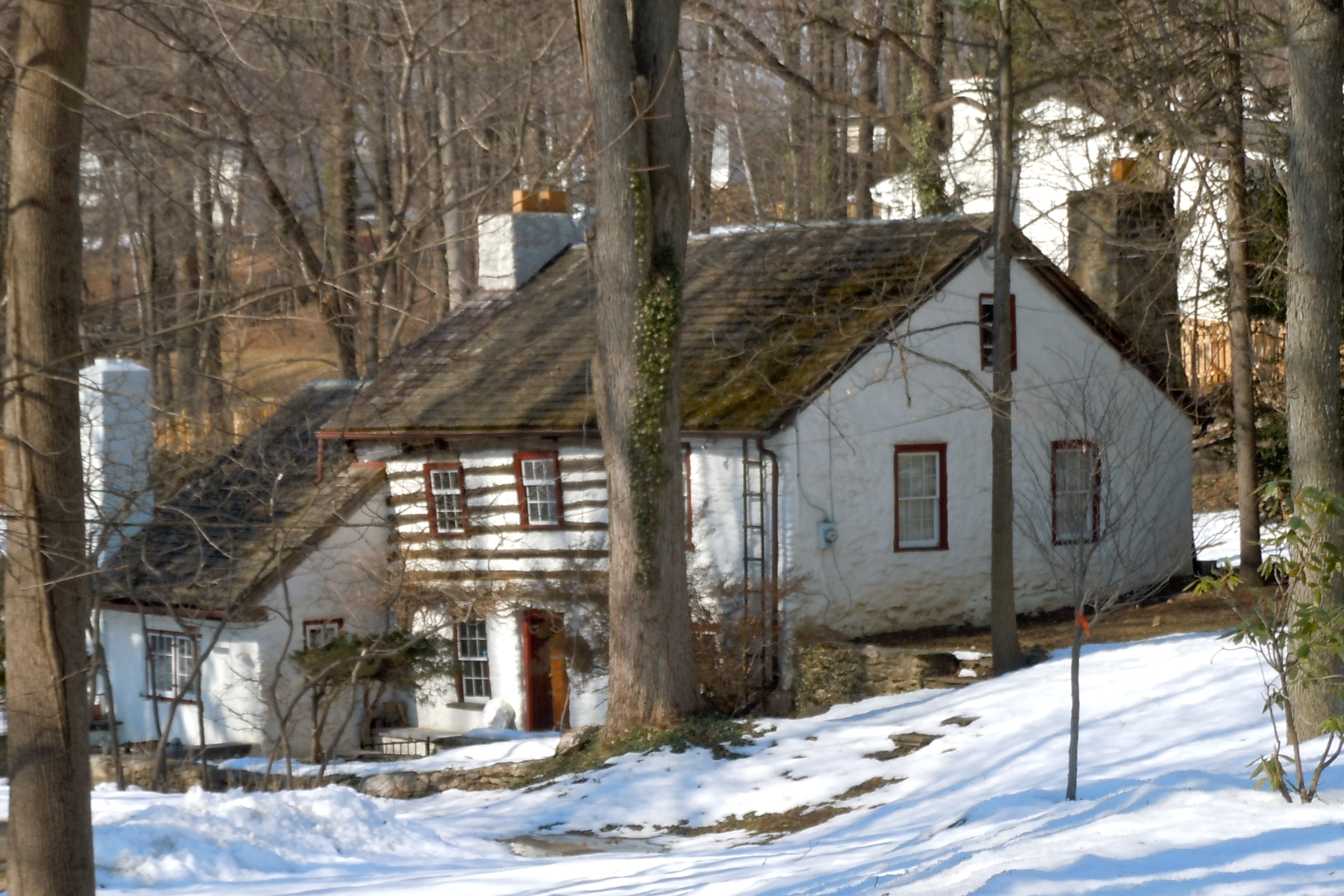
- Wetherby–Hampton–Snyder–Wilson–Erdman Log House, February 2011

- Location within Pennsylvania Location within the United States
- Location: 251 Irish Rd., Tredyffrin Township, Pennsylvania
- Coordinates: 40°3′0″N 75°27′25″W
- Area: 1.6 acres (0.65 ha)
- Built: c. 1725
- Architectural style: Log House
- NRHP reference No.: 73001613
- Added to NRHP: April 2, 1973

Wetherby–Hampton–Snyder–Wilson–Erdman Log House, also known as Cockleburr, Prologue House, and Cabindale, is a historic home located in Tredyffrin Township, Chester County, Pennsylvania. The original section was built about 1725, and is a 2 1/2-story, 2-bay dwelling. The first story is of slate and the upper stories of log construction. A 2 1/2-story stone wing was added between 1817 and 1835. A 1 1/2-story rear wing was added in the 20th century.

It was listed on the National Register of Historic Places in 1973.
