= Cressbrook Farm =

Historic house in Pennsylvania, United States

- U.S. National Register of Historic Places
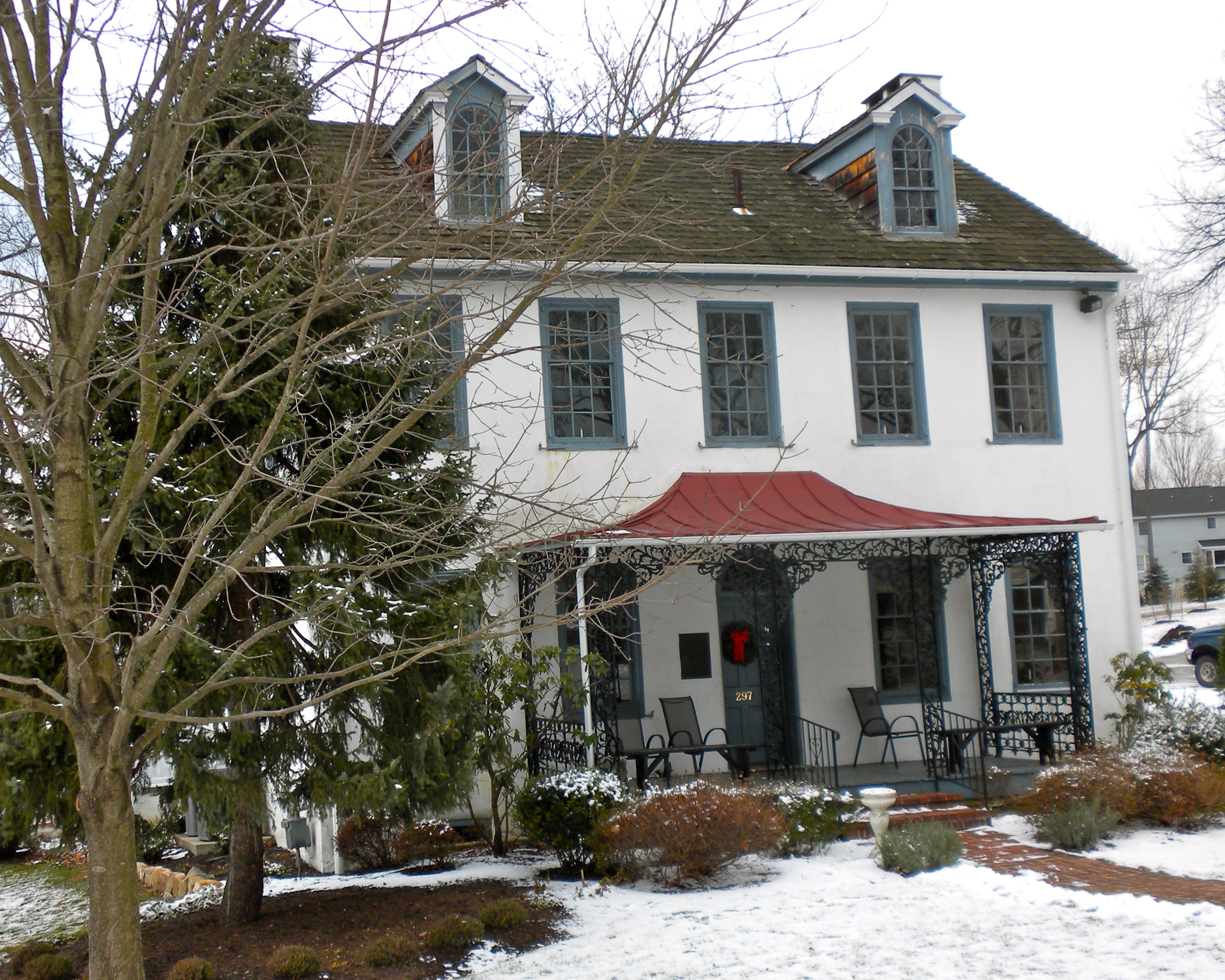
- Cressbrook Farm, January 2010

- Location within Pennsylvania Location within the United States
- Location: South of Valley Forge, off Interstate 76, Tredyffrin Township, Pennsylvania
- Coordinates: 40°4′38″N 75°27′3″W
- Area: 1 acre (0.40 ha)
- Built: c. 1745, 1825
- NRHP reference No.: 72001106
- Added to NRHP: October 26, 1972

Cressbrook Farm, also known as the Former Quarters of Brigadier General Duportail, is a historic home located in Tredyffrin Township, Chester County, Pennsylvania. The original house was built about 1745, and it has been enlarged several times since the main portion was added in 1825. It is a 2 1/2-story, five-bay, stuccoed stone structure. During the American Revolution the house served as headquarters for Brigadier General Louis Lebègue Duportail in late 1777 and early 1778, during the encampment at Valley Forge.

It was listed on the National Register of Historic Places in 1972. Located adjacent to the house is the Federal Barn, listed in 1980.
