= David Havard House =

Historic house in Pennsylvania, United States

- U.S. National Register of Historic Places
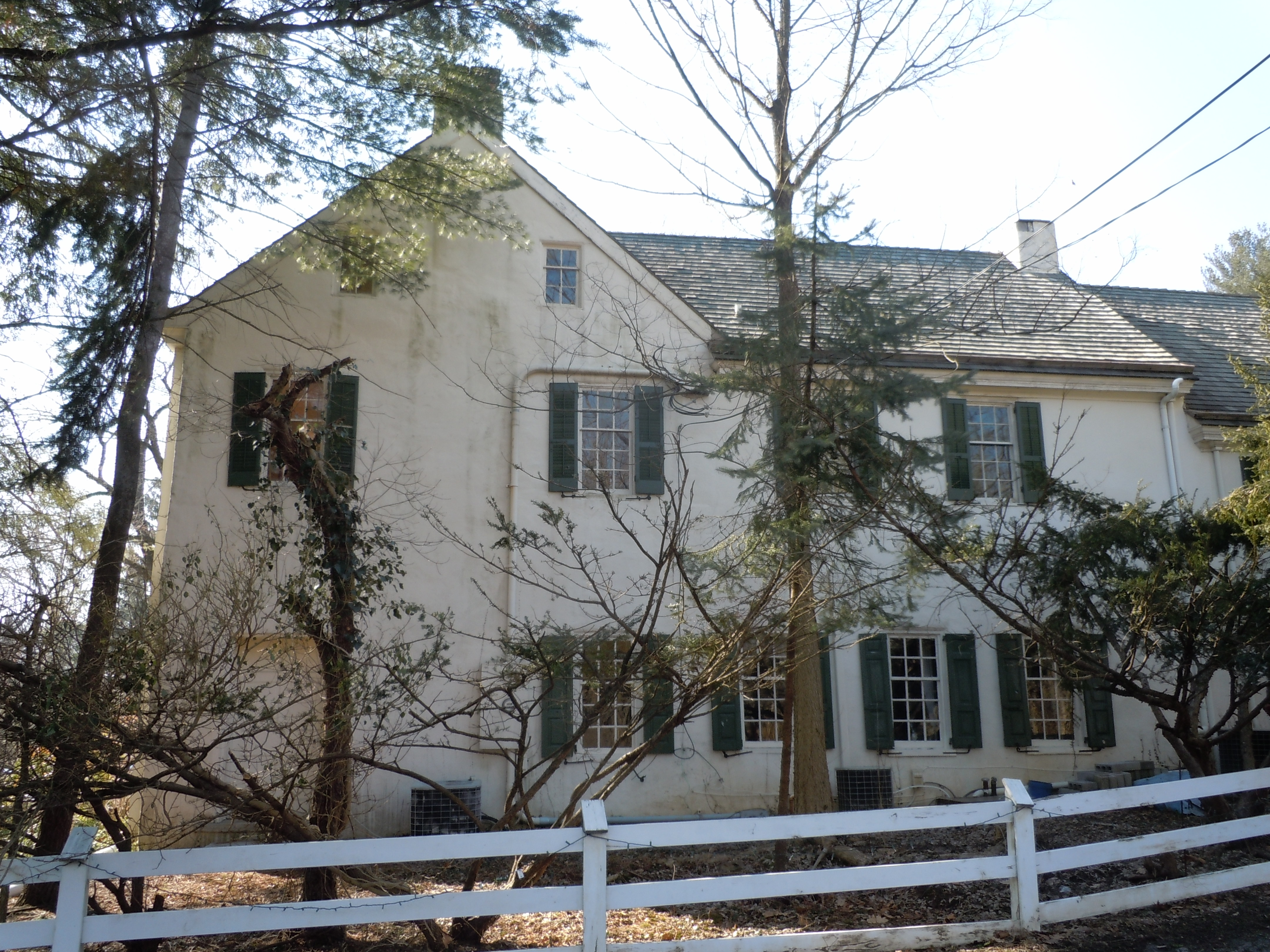
- David Havard House, February 2011

- Location within Pennsylvania Location within the United States
- Location: South of Valley Forge, off Interstate 76, Tredyffrin Township, Pennsylvania
- Coordinates: 40°4′24″N 75°27′47″W
- Area: 1 acre (0.40 ha)
- Built: c. 1766
- NRHP reference No.: 72001107
- Added to NRHP: October 26, 1972

The David Havard House, also known as the Former Quarters of Lee and Bradford, is a historic home located near Valley Forge in Tredyffrin Township, Chester County, Pennsylvania. During the American Revolutionary War, it served as quarters for several of George Washington's senior officers.

The original house was built about 1766, and is a 2 1/2-story, stuccoed stone structure. It has a rear wing. It was listed on the National Register of Historic Places in 1972.

== Historical significance ==
The homes of David Havard and two of his brothers were used as lodging and headquarters by officers serving under George Washington, during the encampment of Washington's army at Valley Forge from December 1777 through June 1778.

Upon the arrival of the Continental Army at Valley Forge, the David Havard House served as quarters for Colonel William Bradford and Colonel Elias Boudinot, who were brothers-in-law. Bradford's older brother Thomas, a captain, arrived in January 1778, and their father, Colonel William Bradford Sr., joined them in April 1778.

General Charles Lee, who had been held prisoner by the British in New York, first arrived in Valley Forge in April 1778, after Boudinot negotiated an exchange of prisoners. He took up residence in the David Havard House on May 21, 1778, and shortly afterward, the Bradfords moved elsewhere.

== Chesterbrook Farm ==
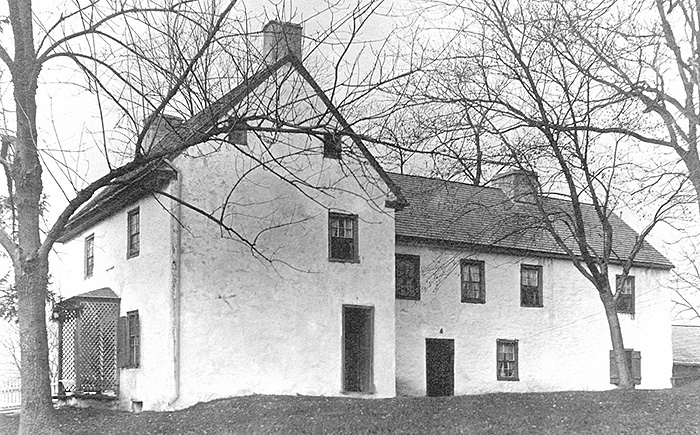
The David Havard House, c. 1900

Several generations of the Havard family occupied the house until it was purchased in 1881 by Alexander Cassatt, president of the Pennsylvania Railroad, who turned the surrounding farmland into a 600-acre hunting preserve called Chesterbrook Farm, known for its racing stables.

The house, which still stands on Bradford Road in Chesterbrook, Pennsylvania, remains in use as the clubhouse for the Picket Post Swim and Tennis Club.
