= Drew O'Keefe =

American attorney (1915–1989)

Drew J. T. O'Keefe (July 18, 1915 – June 17, 1989) was a U.S. attorney for the Eastern District of Pennsylvania.

He originated from South Philadelphia. An alumnus of St. Joseph's College, he received his law degree from Temple University School of Law. Prior to becoming an assistant U.S. attorney in 1947, he worked for the United States Navy for almost three years. He served in World War II and held the rank lieutenant. He worked as an assistant U.S. attorney for the Eastern District of Pennsylvania, then became U.S. attorney in 1961, a position which he took until 1969.

He had residences in Berwyn, Pennsylvania and Naples, Florida. He died at his Berwyn house on June 17, 1989 at age 73.
