= Conestoga High School =

Public high school in Berwyn, Pennsylvania, United States

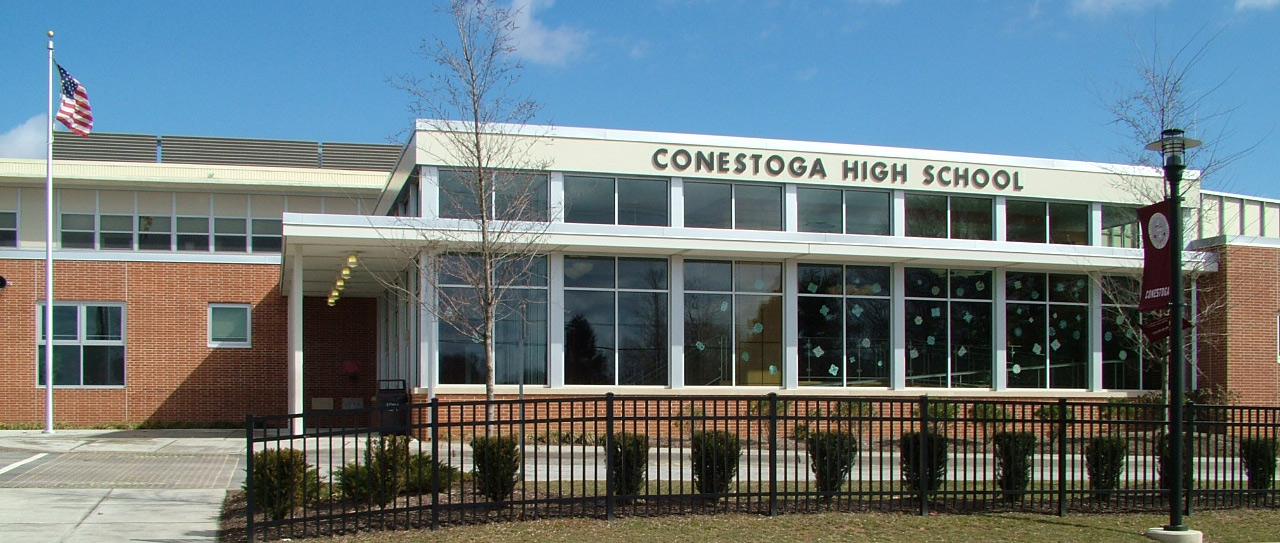
- Conestoga High School in 2006

Location
- 200 Irish Rd; Berwyn, Pennsylvania 19312; United States; 40°02′50″N 75°27′12″W

Information
- Other names: Conestoga Senior High School, CHS
- Former name: Tredyffrin Easttown High School
- Type: Comprehensive public high school
- Motto: A Tradition of Excellence
- Established: October 27, 1954; 72 years ago
- School district: Tredyffrin/Easttown
- NCES District ID: 4223640
- Superintendent: Richard Gusick
- CEEB code: 390295
- NCES School ID: 422364001423
- Principal: Amy Meisinger
- Teaching staff: 149.00 (FTE)
- Grades: 9–12
- Enrollment: 2,361 (2023–2024)
- Student to teacher ratio: 15.85
- Campus type: Suburban
- Colors: Garnet and gray
- Mascot: The Pioneer
- Nickname: Stoga
- Newspaper: The Spoke
- Yearbook: The Pioneer
- Feeder schools: Tredyffrin Easttown Middle School; Valley Forge Middle School
- Website: Conestoga Homepage

Conestoga High School, located in Tredyffrin Township, Pennsylvania, is the only upper secondary school in the Tredyffrin/Easttown School District. It has a Berwyn post office address, though it is not in the Berwyn census-designated place.

The school is located roughly within the Philadelphia metropolitan area, 20 miles (32 km) northwest of Philadelphia in the Main Line suburbs.

== Departments ==
Conestoga has eight academic departments: Business/Technology, English, World Languages, Mathematics, Science, Social Studies, Visual and Performing Arts, and Wellness/Fitness/Family & Consumer Science. Students must earn 24 credits in order to graduate. One credit is equivalent to a year-long class.

== Distinctions and honors ==
In 2026, Niche.com ranked the Tredyffrin Easttown school district the best in Pennsylvania. In the 2016 edition of Newsweek's "America's Top High Schools", Conestoga High School was ranked 36th in the nation and the 1st in Pennsylvania.

=== National Merit/College Board Recognition ===
The Conestoga Class of 2022 includes 39 National Merit Semi-finalists, the most in Pennsylvania. The Conestoga Class of 2018 includes 34 National Merit Semi-finalists, 26 National Merit Commended students, and 2 National Hispanic Scholars.

== Extracurricular activities ==
=== Student Journalism ===
==== The Spoke ====
Conestoga is home to a student-produced news website, Spoke.news (formerly Stoganews.com). It is produced by the staff of The Spoke, Conestoga's student run newspaper. The Spoke has been the recipient of several national awards.

=== Civic engagement ===
In 2017, Conestoga was the first high school to receive the Pennsylvania Governor's Civic Engagement Award for registering 85% of eligible students to vote. In 2018, the students who ran the drive brought the organization "New Voters" to the national level.

=== Athletic teams ===
Conestoga competes in 17 different sporting events generally within the Central League.

	Male	Female		Male	Female		Male	Female
Fall	Cross Country	Cross Country	Winter	Basketball	Basketball	Spring	Baseball	Softball
	Football	Field Hockey		Swimming	Swimming		Lacrosse	Lacrosse
	Golf	Golf		Indoor Track	Indoor Track		Track	Track
	Soccer	Soccer		Wrestling	Cheerleading		Tennis
		Tennis					Volleyball
		Volleyball
		Cheerleading

== Notable alumni ==
- Dave Bush, former professional baseball player, Milwaukee Brewers, Texas Rangers, and Toronto Blue Jays
- Brian Chippendale, rock drummer and vocalist
- Keith J. Chylinski, American prelate
- Jake Cohen, professional basketball player, Maccabi Tel Aviv and Israeli national basketball team
- Chris Donovan, professional soccer player, Philadelphia Union
- Jennie Eisenhower, actress, granddaughter of President Richard Nixon, and great-granddaughter of President Dwight D. Eisenhower
- Robert Ellis, author
- Drew Endy, bioengineering professor, Stanford University, and founder of the Registry of Standard Biological Parts
- FanFan, singer and actress
- Gregg Foreman, musician and actor
- Todd Glass, comedian and actor
- Steve Gerben, Actor, Producer, Writer
- Pat Heim, professional lacrosse player
- Mark Herzlich, professional football player
- Roger Hobbs, author
- Elizabeth Hoffman, executive vice-president, Iowa State University, president emerita, University of Colorado
- Keith Hughes. former professional baseball player
- Kasie Hunt, political correspondent
- Chris Hurst, TV anchor and member of the Virginia House of Delegates
- Abbi Jacobson, actress and co-creator of Comedy Central TV series Broad City
- Larry Krasner, 26th District Attorney of Philadelphia
- Brendon Little, professional baseball player, Toronto Blue Jays
- Craig Lucas, Tony Award-nominated playwright
- Mt. Joy, Indie folk/rock band featuring alumni Matt Quinn and Sam Cooper
- Brian Munroe, Pennsylvania State Representative
- P.T. Ricci, professional lacrosse player
- Johanna Schmitt, professor of evolution and ecology, University of California, Davis and professor of natural history, Brown University
- Grant Shaud, actor
- Tommy Shields, professional baseball player, Chicago Cubs
- Glenn R. Simpson, journalist
- Melissa Shusterman, Pennsylvania State Representative
- Marquis Weeks, professional football player
- John Frank Murphy, United States Federal Judge for the Eastern District of Pennsylvania

== Controversies ==
=== Hazing and sexting ===
In 2015, the Chester County District Attorney's office began investigating reports of sexting against several freshman football players at the school. The father of one of the accused alerted the District Attorney's office that his son was being bullied and hazed by Conestoga's football team. Tredyffrin Township Police investigated and found that the boy had been sodomized with a broomstick by his teammates, and multiple hazing rituals existed within the team, including "No Gay Thursdays," where players engaged in sexually provocative and explicit behavior with their teammates that might otherwise be considered homosexual behavior, otherwise. The victim of the forced sodomization was charged with a misdemeanor for the sexting, and three other players were charged, and pled guilty to, harassment.

=== Gambling ===
In August 2025, the Philadelphia Inquirer reported on an alleged cover-up by school administration into a gambling ring organized by a long-time soccer coach, who was betting on the outcomes of the school's basketball games.

=== Sexual assault ===
In May 2025, Michelle Mercogliano, a special education teacher, was arrested and faces 63 charges relating to allegations that she had sex with a sixteen year old student more than twelve times at her home. She was also charged for allegedly purchasing marijuana for the student.
