= Tredyffrin Township, Pennsylvania =

Township in Pennsylvania, US

Tredyffrin Township
- Township
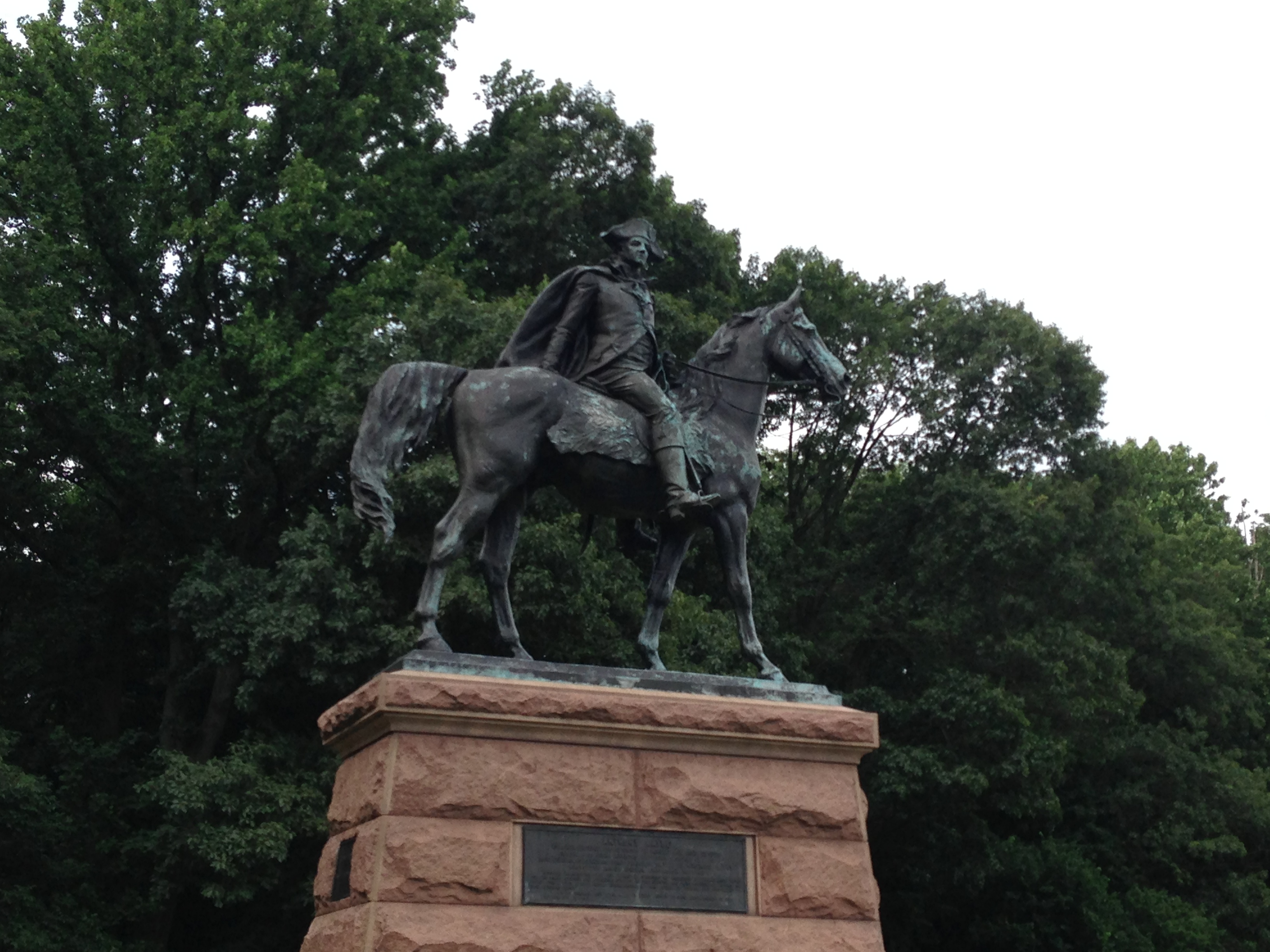
- The Anthony Wayne statue in Valley Forge

- Seal

- Location of Tredyffrin Township in Chester County and of Chester County in Pennsylvania

- Location of Pennsylvania in the United States

- Map showing Tredyffrin Township in Pennsylvania
- Coordinates: 40°03′48″N 75°22′14″W
- Country: United States
- State: Pennsylvania
- County: Chester
- Founded: 1707

Area
  - Total: 19.85 sq mi (51.41 km^{2})
  - Land: 19.76 sq mi (51.19 km^{2})
  - Water: 0.085 sq mi (0.22 km^{2})
- Elevation: 397 ft (121 m)

Population (2020)
  - Total: 31,927
  - Estimate (2025): 31,818
  - Density: 1,615/sq mi (623.7/km^{2})
- Time zone: UTC-5 (EST)
  - Summer (DST): UTC-4 (EDT)
- Area code: 610
- FIPS code: 42-029-77344
- Website: www.tredyffrin.org

Tredyffrin Township ( /trɪˈdɪfrɪn/ Welsh: [trɛˈdɘfrɪn]) is a township in eastern Chester County, Pennsylvania, United States. It is the most populous township in Chester County, with a population of 31,927 at the 2020 census. The township is part of the Philadelphia metropolitan area and the historic Philadelphia Main Line.

Established in 1707 following settlement by Welsh immigrants in the late 17th century, Tredyffrin was historically an agricultural community before undergoing substantial residential and commercial development during the 20th century. The township includes part of Valley Forge National Historical Park, where George Washington and the Continental Army encamped during the American Revolutionary War. Unincorporated communities within the township include Chesterbrook, Strafford, Howellville, East Howellville, and portions of Paoli and Wayne.

== History ==
On March 13, 1684, William Penn decided to set aside a portion of what was then the Province of Pennsylvania for settlements for Welsh immigrants. This area, known as the "Welsh Tract", was surveyed in 1684 and included several modern-day townships, including Tredyffrin. Although the Welsh Tract was originally meant to be a self-ruling municipality, it was divided between Chester County and Philadelphia when that county was created in 1685, and the Welsh subsequently submitted to the authority of Chester County. In 1707, Tredyffrin was incorporated as a township. This name comes from the Welsh tre(f), which means "town", joined to dyffryn, which means "wide, cultivated valley". Tredyffrin was quick to develop into a thriving township. In 1710, the first mill in Tredyffrin was started by Thomas Jerman on what is now North Valley Road. Swedesford Road, one of the first roads in the township, was created by 1718.

As the population of the township grew, with 30 resident landowners in 1722 and 83 in 1774, churches sprung up to meet the demand by religious residents. In 1710, the Baptist minister Hugh Davis moved to the Great Valley from Britain and, there being several Baptist families in this area, the Baptist Church in the Great Valley was formed on April 22, 1711. The church originally met in Radnor. However, there were enough members of this Baptist church that by 1722, a log building was erected in Tredyffrin to serve the congregation.

As Tredyffrin includes part of Valley Forge National Historical Park, there are many Revolutionary War-related sites in the township, especially the park and houses where various generals were quartered.

Development in the township was sparked in the 19th century by construction and advertisement of the "Main Line" railroad service, which terminated in Paoli, which straddles the western border of the township.

Tredyffrin-Easttown school district was unusual for the area in being racially integrated during the early part of the century. In 1932, the district planned to segregate after building a new school, and African Americans in the township boycotted the school system for two years in protest (the "School Fight"). In 1934 a negotiated settlement was reached whereby the schools remained integrated, and helped kill school segregation in Pennsylvania.

During the Cold War, a Nike anti-aircraft missile site was active in the township. It was located off Le Boutillier Road, near Swedesford Road.

== Historic buildings ==
County Bridge No. 171, Cramond, Cressbrook Farm, Federal Barn, Great Valley Mill, Greenwood Farm, David Havard House, Lafayette's Quarters, Maj. Gen. Lord Stirling Quarters, Mount Zion A.M.E. Church, Strafford Railroad Station, Valley Forge National Historical Park, Joseph Walker House, Van Leer Cabin, and Wetherby–Hampton–Snyder–Wilson–Erdman Log House are listed on the National Register of Historic Places. In addition, the Wharton Esherick Museum is listed as a National Historic Landmark; it was built starting in 1926.

Other notable buildings are:

- Diamond Rock Schoolhouse, an octagonal one-room school built in 1818.
- Seven colonial log houses and cabins.
- Knox Covered Bridge in Valley Forge National Historical Park.
- Revolutionary War sites: Quarters of Major General William Alexander, Lord Stirling; Quarters of Major General Marquis de Lafayette; Quarters of Brigadier General Anthony Wayne; Quarters of General Charles Cornwallis, and a number of other generals.
- Old Eagle School, built in 1788

== Geography ==
According to the U.S. Census Bureau, the township has a total area of 19.9 square miles (52 km^{2}), of which 19.8 square miles (51 km^{2}) is land and 0.04 square miles (0.10 km^{2}), or 0.15%, is water.

Tredyffrin's climate borders upon hot-summer humid continental (Dfa) and humid subtropical (Cfa). The hardiness zone is 7a as in almost all of Chester County. 2023 USDA Plant Hardiness Zone Map | USDA Plant Hardiness Zone Map

== Transportation ==
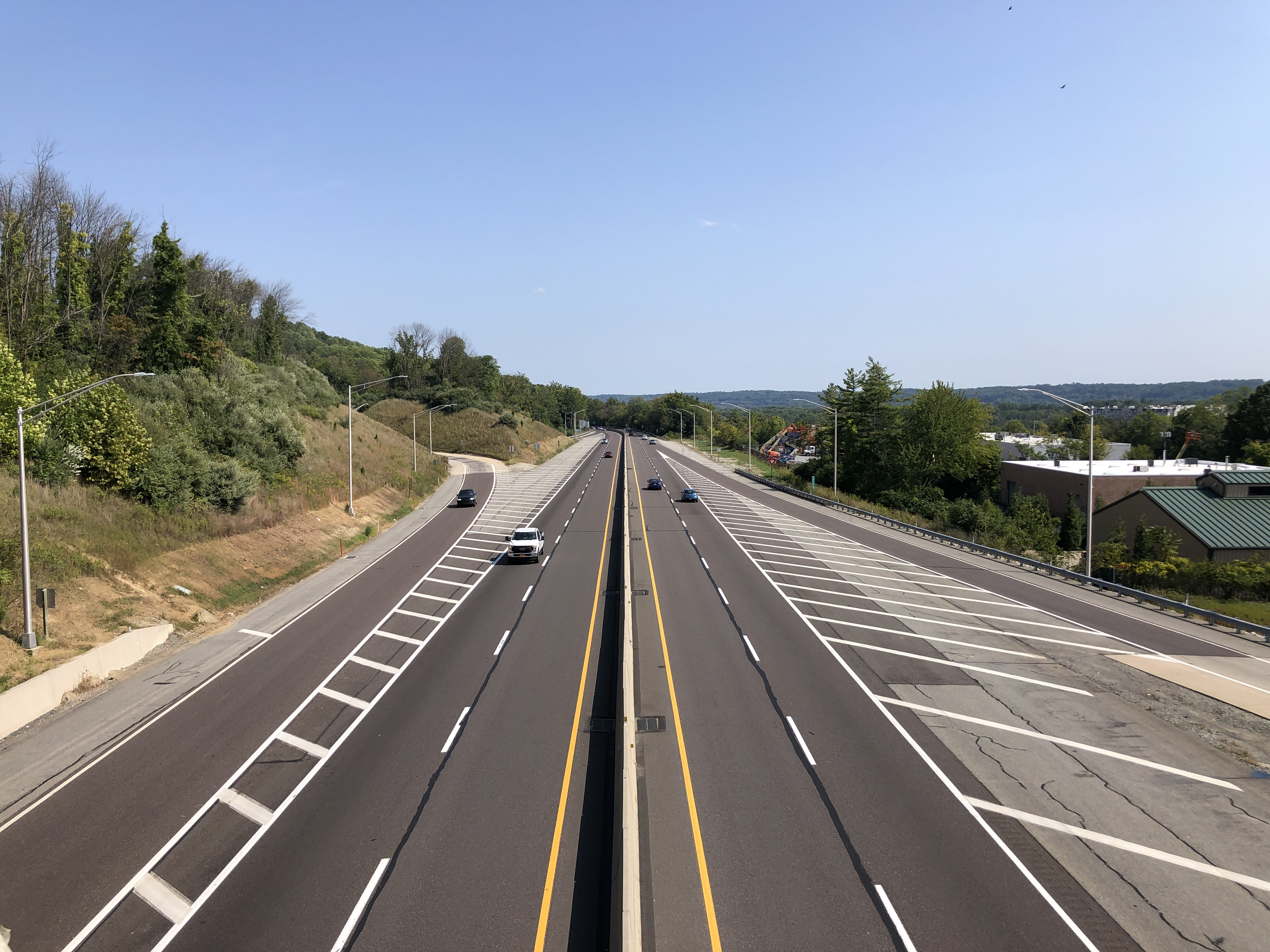
The Pennsylvania Turnpike/I-76 eastbound in Tredyffrin Township

As of 2018, there were 150.13 miles (241.61 km) of public roads in Tredyffrin Township, of which 6.30 miles (10.14 km) were maintained by the Pennsylvania Turnpike Commission (PTC), 36.94 miles (59.45 km) were maintained by the Pennsylvania Department of Transportation (PennDOT) and 106.89 miles (172.02 km) were maintained by the township.

The Pennsylvania Turnpike (I-76) is the most prominent road serving Tredyffrin Township. It follows a southwest–northeast alignment across the northwestern portion of the township. U.S. Route 202 follows a similar alignment across the center of the township. U.S. Route 422 begins at US 202 in the northeastern corner of the township and follows the County Line Expressway northwestward. U.S. Route 30 follows Lancaster Avenue along an east–west alignment through the southern section of the township. Finally, Pennsylvania Route 252 follows Leopard Road, Bear Hill Road, Swedesford Road, Valley Forge Road and Valley Creek Road along a north–south alignment through the middle of the township.

== Demographics ==
Historical population
Census	Pop.	Note	%±
1930	5,458		—
1940	6,260		14.7%
1950	7,836		25.2%
1960	16,004		104.2%
1970	23,404		46.2%
1980	23,019		−1.6%
1990	28,028		21.8%
2000	29,062		3.7%
2010	29,332		0.9%
2020	31,927		8.8%

At the 2010 census, the township was 83.3% non-Hispanic White, 3.3% Black or African American, 0.1% Native American, 9.8% Asian, and 1.4% were two or more races. 2.2% of the population were of Hispanic or Latino ancestry.

As of the 2000 United States census, there were 29,062 people, 12,223 households, and 7,834 families residing in the township. The population density was 1,464.9 inhabitants per square mile (565.6/km^{2}). There were 12,551 housing units at an average density of 632.6 per square mile (244.2/km^{2}). The racial makeup of the township was 90.88% White, 2.84% African American, 0.11% Native American, 5.12% Asian, 0.01% Pacific Islander, 0.29% from other races, and 0.74% from two or more races. Hispanic or Latino of any race were 1.20% of the population.

There were 12,223 households, out of which 29.0% had children under the age of 18 living with them, 55.9% were married couples living together, 6.2% had a female householder with no husband present, and 35.9% were non-families. 30.1% of all households were made up of individuals, and 9.1% had someone living alone who was 65 years of age or older. The average household size was 2.36 and the average family size was 2.99.

In the township the population was spread out, with 23.3% under the age of 18, 4.7% from 18 to 24, 30.1% from 25 to 44, 27.2% from 45 to 64, and 14.7% who were 65 years of age or older. The median age was 40 years. For every 100 females there were 89.9 males. For every 100 females age 18 and over, there were 86.7 males.

The median income for a household in the township was $82,258, and the median income for a family was $105,183 (these figures had risen to $90,915 and $121,809 respectively as of a 2007 estimate). Males had a median income of $76,393 versus $46,124 for females. The per capita income for the township was $47,584. About 2.2% of families and 3.7% of the population were below the poverty line, including 4.6% of those under age 18 and 2.8% of those age 65 or over.

== Government and politics ==
=== Local government ===
Tredyffrin Township operates under a home rule charter and is governed by a seven-member Board of Supervisors. Four supervisors are elected at-large, while the remaining three represent the township's Eastern, Middle, and Western districts. All seven supervisors have equal voting authority, regardless of how they are elected. Members serve staggered four-year terms, with elections held in odd-numbered years.

As of December 4, 2025:

District	Supervisor	Party	Term ends
At-Large	Sharon Humble	Democratic	2027
At-Large	Carlotta Johnston-Pugh	Democratic	2027
At-Large	David Miller	Democratic	2029
At-Large	Hans van Mol	Democratic	2029
Eastern District	Julie Gosse	Democratic	2027
Middle District	Eamon Brazunas	Democratic	2029
Western District	Kasi Bhaskar	Democratic	2027

=== Political history ===
Historically a Republican-leaning community, Tredyffrin Township has experienced a gradual shift toward the Democratic Party during the 21st century. In July 2010, registered Republicans accounted for approximately 45% of voters, compared with 39% registered Democrats and 16% registered with other parties or unaffiliated.

Despite the Republican registration advantage, Democratic presidential candidate Barack Obama carried the township in the 2008 presidential election, receiving approximately 58% of the vote against Republican John McCain. Obama again won the township in the 2012 presidential election, receiving approximately 52% against Mitt Romney.

By October 2025, Democrats had become the township's largest registered political party, accounting for approximately 44% of registered voters, compared with 34% Republicans and 21% unaffiliated or registered with other parties.

== Geology ==
The rocks of Tredyffrin were laid down in the upper Paleozoic, meaning that they are primarily metamorphic. Limestone is often at the surface in the Great Valley, so many limestone kilns were created in the 18th century. Mine owner William Rennyson sold the fizzy water from his Howellville limestone quarry as "Tredyffrin Water" around 1900. The northern edge of the township is a ridge of quartzite and sandstone (the Cambrian Chickies Formation) including Valley Forge Mountain (or Mount Misery), which was mined for quartz in the 18th century through the mid-19th century.

== Education ==
=== Primary and secondary schools ===
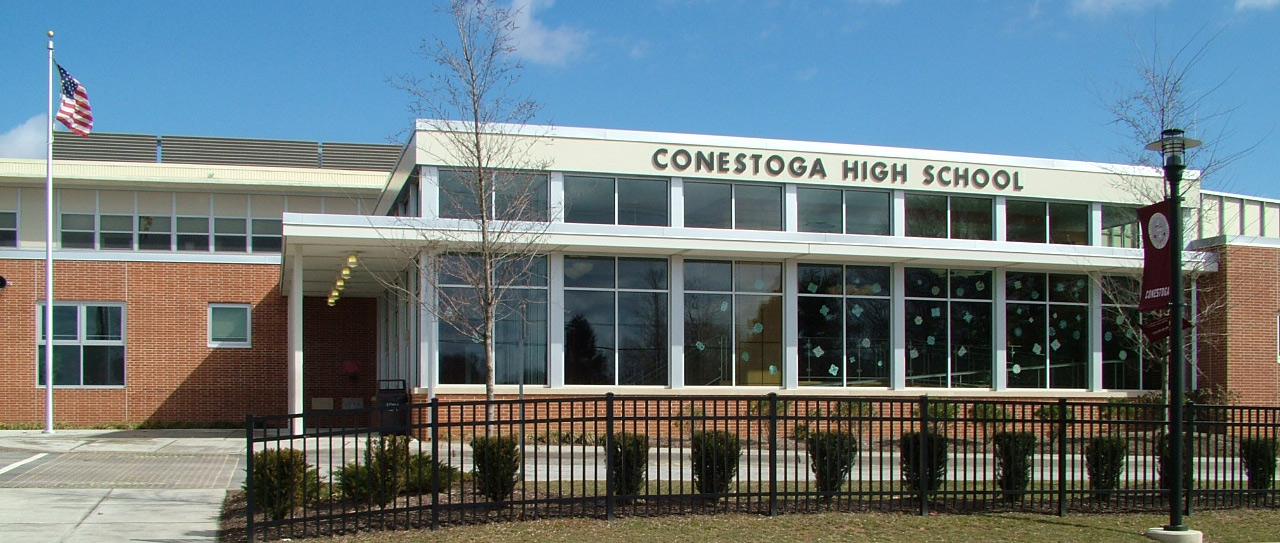
Conestoga High School

Tredyffrin Township lies within the Tredyffrin/Easttown School District. Students residing within township boundaries attend Hillside Elementary School, New Eagle Elementary School, and Valley Forge Elementary School for grades K–4. Tredyffrin/Easttown Middle School and Valley Forge Middle School serve students in grades 5–8, and Conestoga High School serves students in grades 9–12.

Private schools in Tredyffrin Township include:

- Delaware Valley Friends School in Paoli
- Devon Preparatory School (grades 6–12) in Devon
- Woodlynde School in Strafford
- Heritage School (preschool) in Wayne address
- Vanguard School (ungraded special education), in Paoli

=== Public libraries ===
Tredyffrin Township Libraries operates Tredyffrin Public Library and Paoli Library.

The Tredyffrin Library, with 18,000 square feet (1,700 m^{2}) of space as of 1977, is located in the Strafford community. The architectural firm Mitchell/Giurgola developed the Tredyffrin Library. It has an amphitheater that is focused on a park in a southward direction. The library has a single large reading room. The library building has a larger two-story end, while the other end has only one story at the upper level. Offices at the main level are in a separate element of the structure from the main reading room, and this structure juts out from the flue. Architectural Record said that this "allows direct access to the reading room from the public entrance." In 1990 a new children's library was created on the lower level of the building in previously unfinished space.

As the community continued to grow and change, plans were finalized in 2004 to renovate and expand Tredyffrin Library. In September 2007, the library broke ground for a $6 million renovation and expansion. On January 31, 2009, the entire expanded building was open to the public for the first time.

Architectural Record stated that Tredyffrin Library and the library built in Condon Hall of the University of Washington School of Law, which was also designed by Mitchell/Giurgola, have common underlying concepts. According to the publication, the shared concepts were "unusual sensitivity in using natural light to best advantage while warding off the sun," a "quickly apparent organization of functions," and being "responsive to the varying situations in which it is built."

== Sources ==
- Futhey, J. Smith, and Gilbert Cope. History of Chester County, Pennsylvania, with Genealogical and Biographical Sketches. Philadelphia: Louis H. Everts, 1881. ISBN 0-7884-0206-4
- "Geologic Map of Pennsylvania". 2000. Commonwealth of Pennsylvania, Department of Conservation and Natural Resources, Bureau of Topographic and Geologic Survey. December 16, 2002.
- "History of Tredyffrin Township". Tredyffrin Township, Chester County, PA. December 16, 2002.
- "Limestone and Dolomite Distribution in Pennsylvania". 2000. Commonwealth of Pennsylvania, Department of Conservation and Natural Resources, Bureau of Topographic and Geologic Survey. December 16, 2002.
- "Relating common solutions: two libraries by Mitchell/Giurgola." Architectural Record. August 1977. Volume 162. p. 93-98. ISSN 0003-858X.
