= Old Eagle School =

Historical building in Pennsylvania

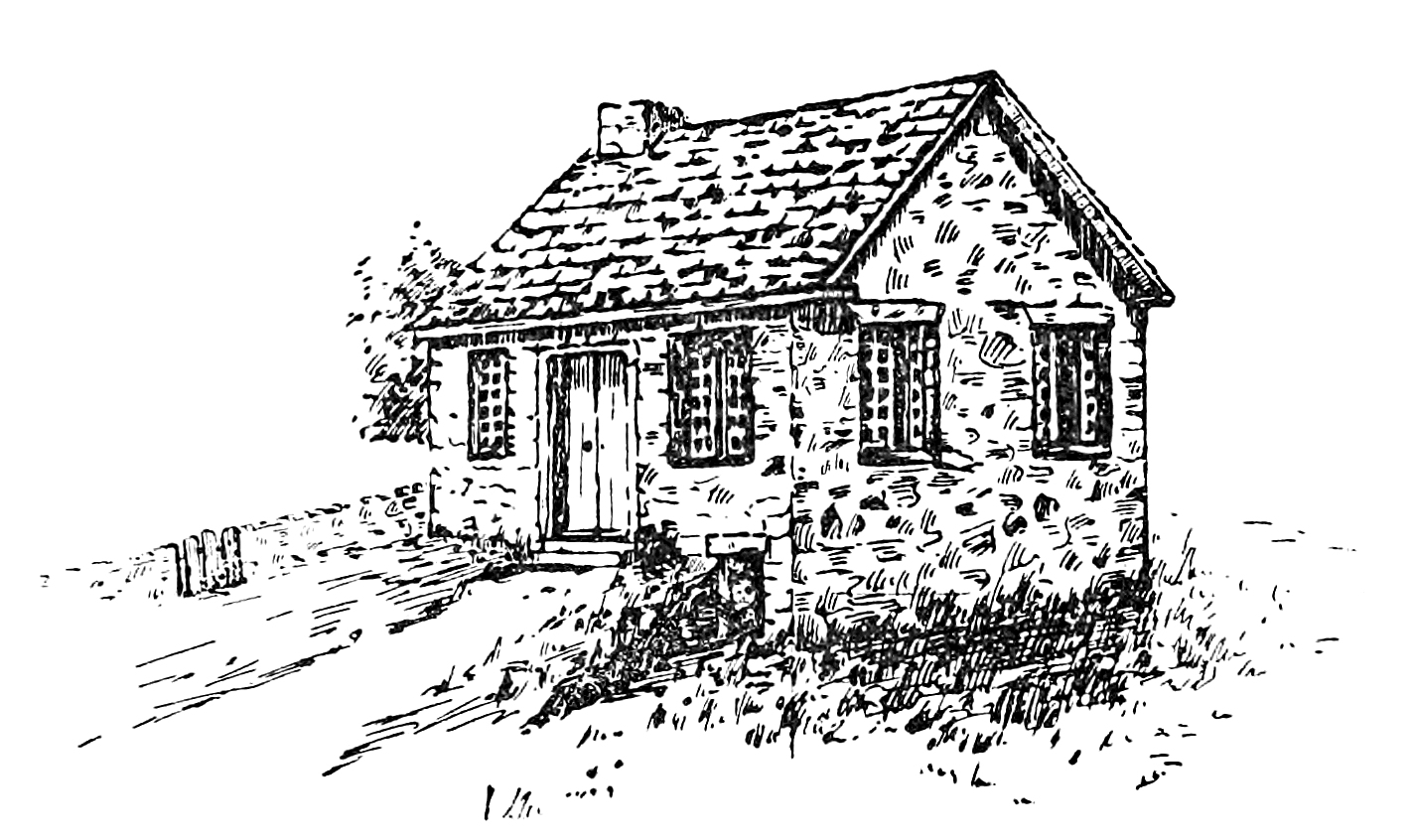
Old Eagle School in 1788.

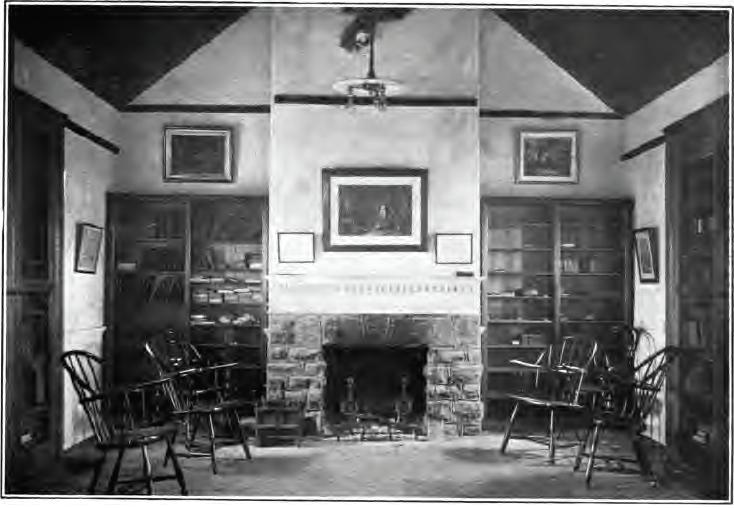
Interior of Old Eagle School as it appeared circa 1909

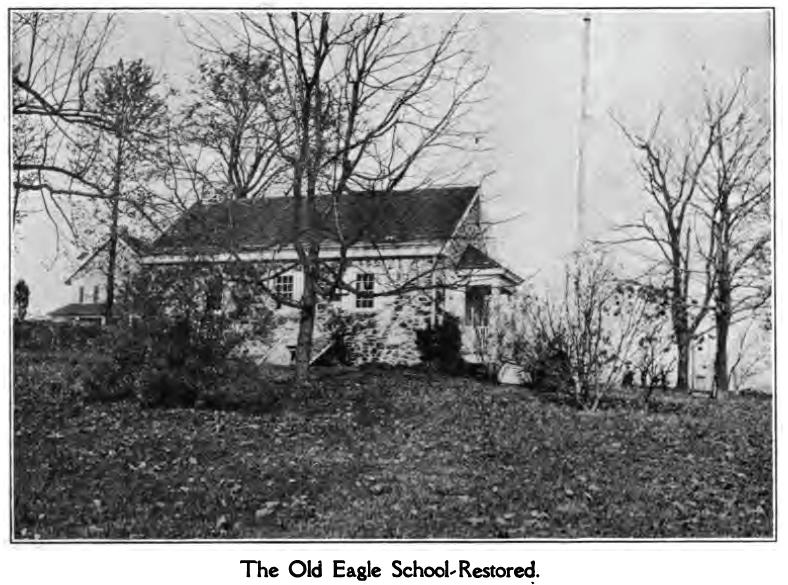
Exterior of Old Eagle School as it appeared circa 1909

The Old Eagle School is located near Strafford Station on the main line of the Pennsylvania Railroad in Tredyffrin Township, Chester County, Pennsylvania.

== Description ==
The building is a one-story stone structure with three windows on each side and two windows on the end. Inscribed on the southern end of the building is the date "1788". Adjacent to the school is a graveyard which includes the remains of early settlers and participants in the American Revolution.

== History ==
On 16 March 1765 Jacob Girardin purchased 150 acres (0.61 km^{2}) of land north of the site of the present day Strafford Station. Shortly thereafter a log cabin church was built near the site of the present day school building. In 1788 the Old Eagle School House was built, and the church was demolished circa 1805.

The original building was a stone one-room structure with several large windows, devoid of glass approximately half the size of the current structure. The building was at first heated by an open wood fire, later replaced with a wood-burning stove. Students sat on wooden slab benches arranged in double rows around the edges of the building, and the master sat in the center near the fireplace.

The building was used for community purposes, such as political and religious meetings as well as education. The building was expanded in 1835 to the present size. Heavy use took a toll on the structure such that in 1842 it was said to be in "ruinous condition" A new building was erected about a quarter mile west and the current building fell into disuse aside from occasional Sunday religious services.

In 1845 some parishioners from St. David's Church in nearby Radnor, Pennsylvania proposed instituting Episcopal services in the building but were rebuffed by Baptists who claimed prior rights to the site. Reference to the property's deed mentioned that the property was to be devoted to the use by all denominations and the Episcopalians were permitted to hold their services and start a Sunday school.

In 1874 the public school board surrendered use of the building in favor of a newer school built at Pechin's Corner to the northwest. Following a number of years of dispute over the use and disposition of the property, on 6 May 1895 a board of trustees were appointed to oversee and renovate the property which had once again fallen into a state of decay.

== Current ==
The Old Eagle School is currently overseen by a board of trustees responsible for the upkeep of the building and grounds. They are open free of charge to the public on Sundays from 2:00 to 4:00 pm during the summer.

The Old Eagle School is located at 40°03′05″N 75°24′12″W on the eponymous Old Eagle School Road.

== Gallery ==
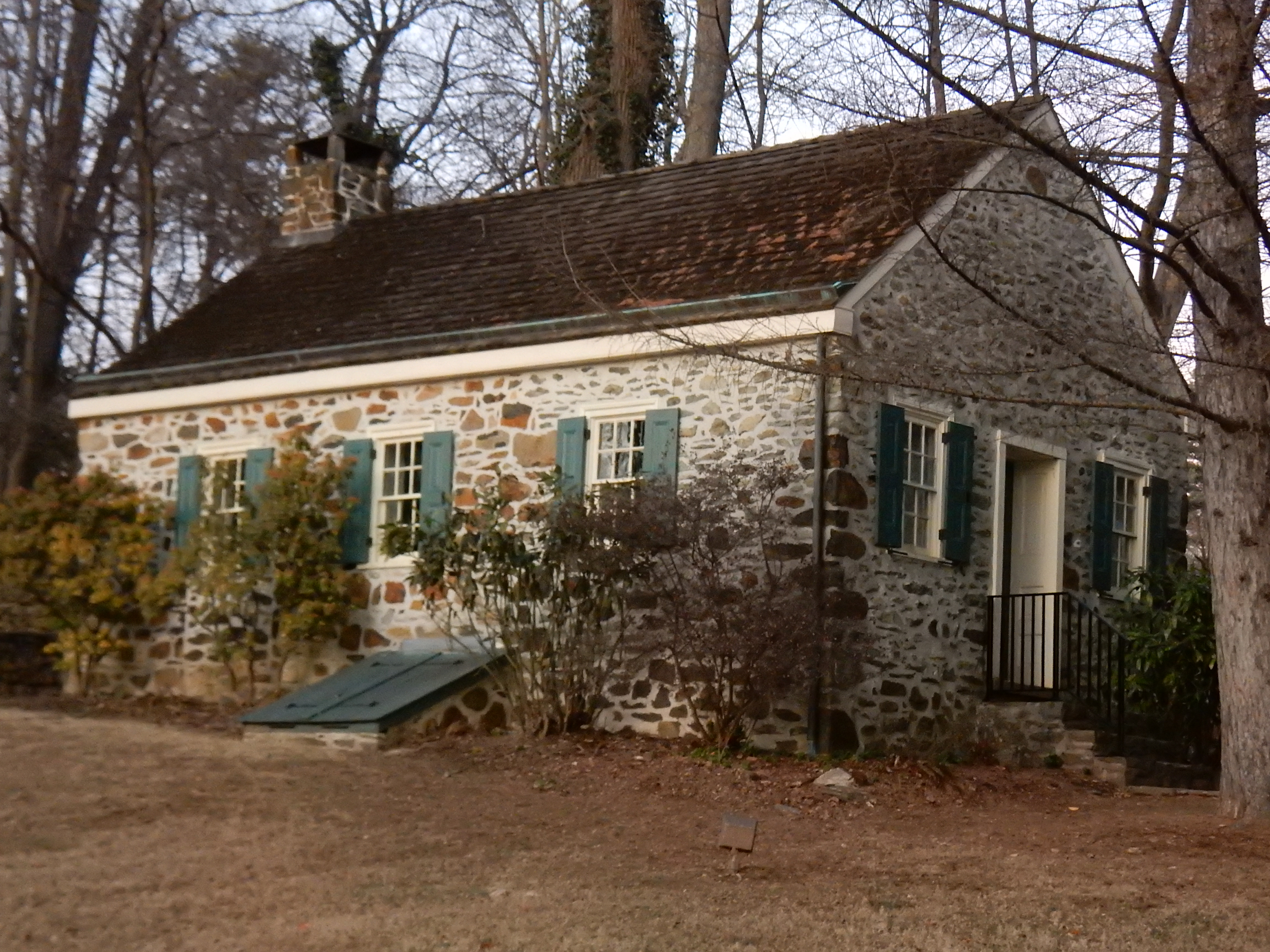

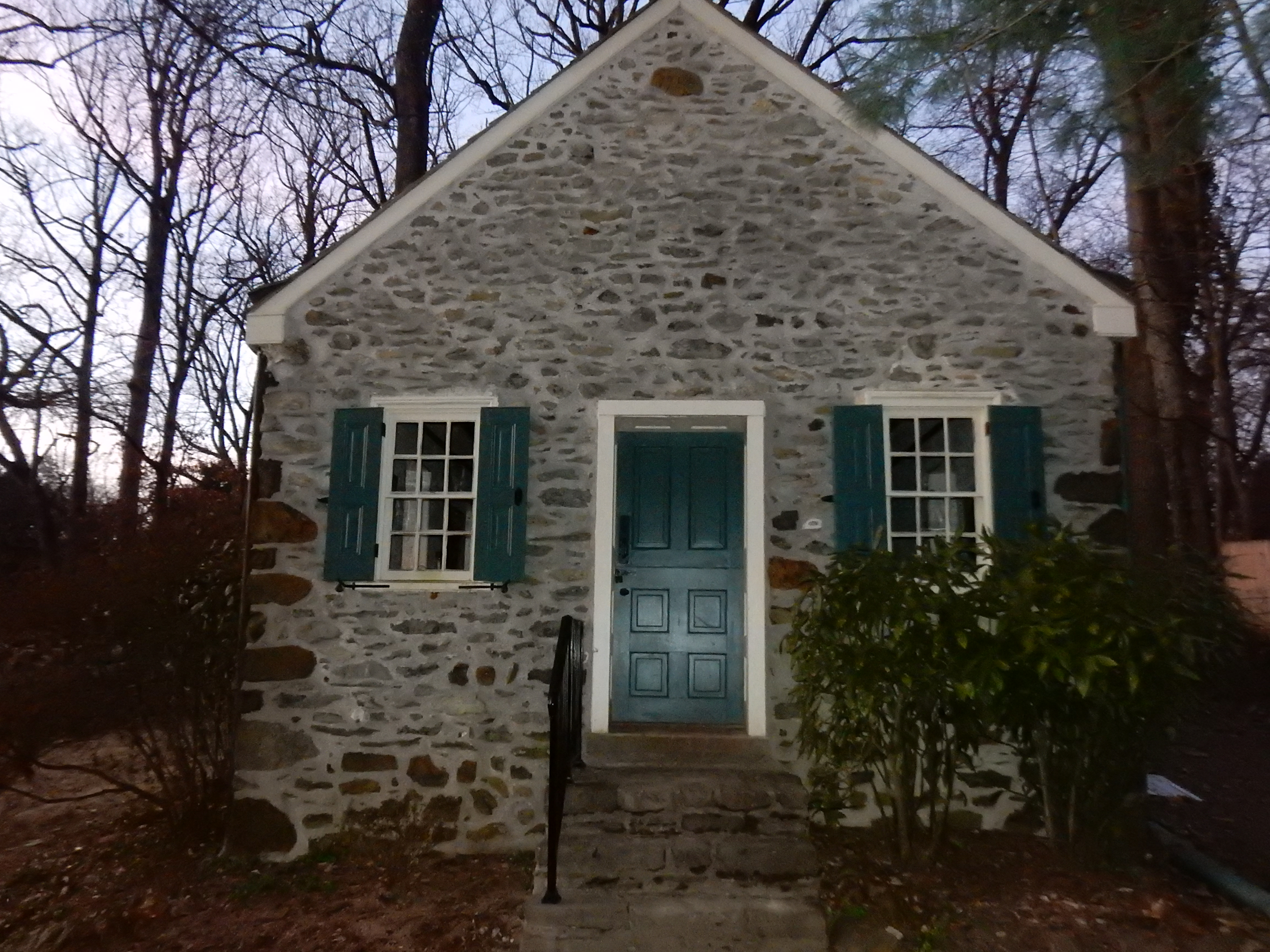

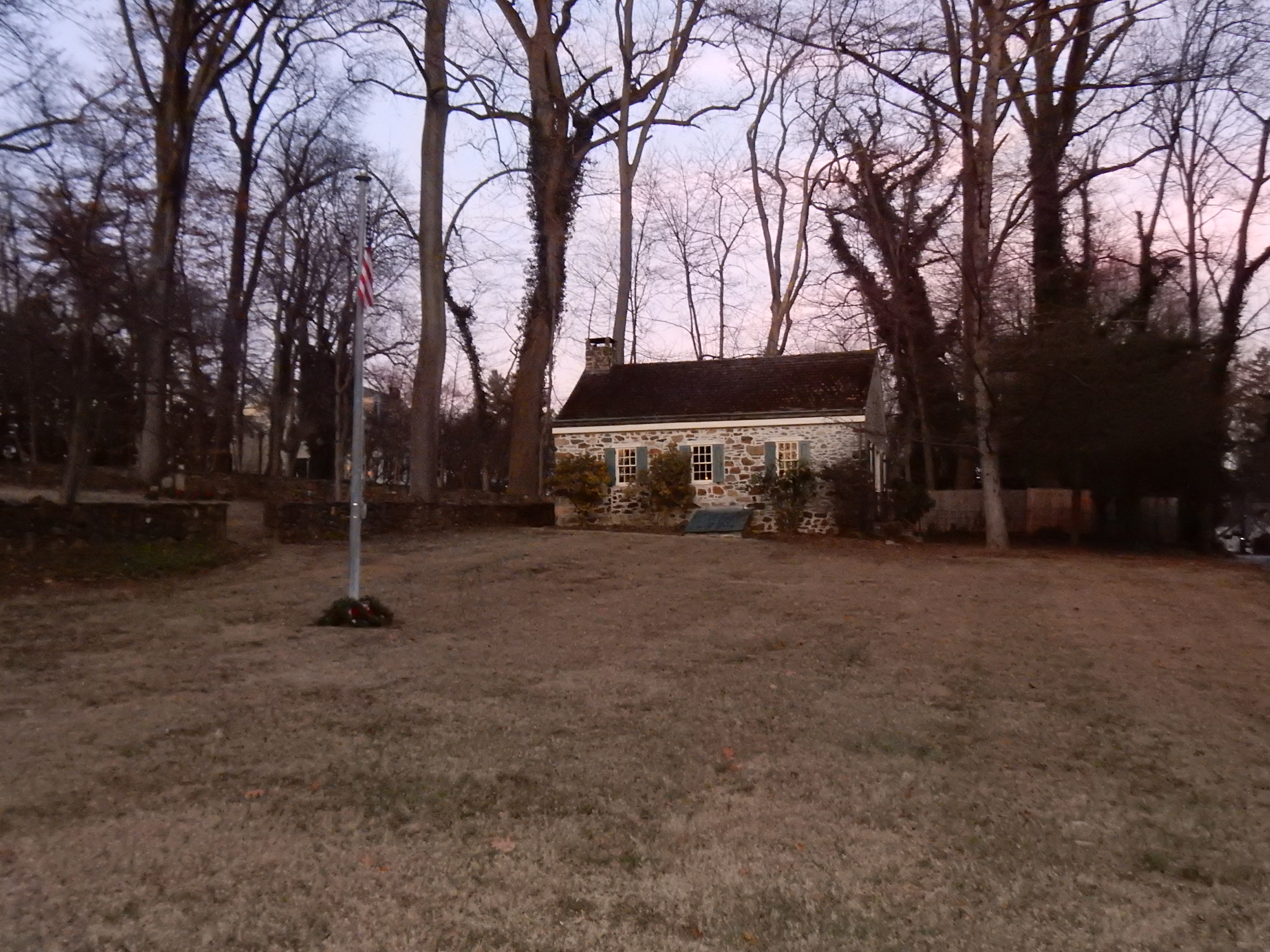

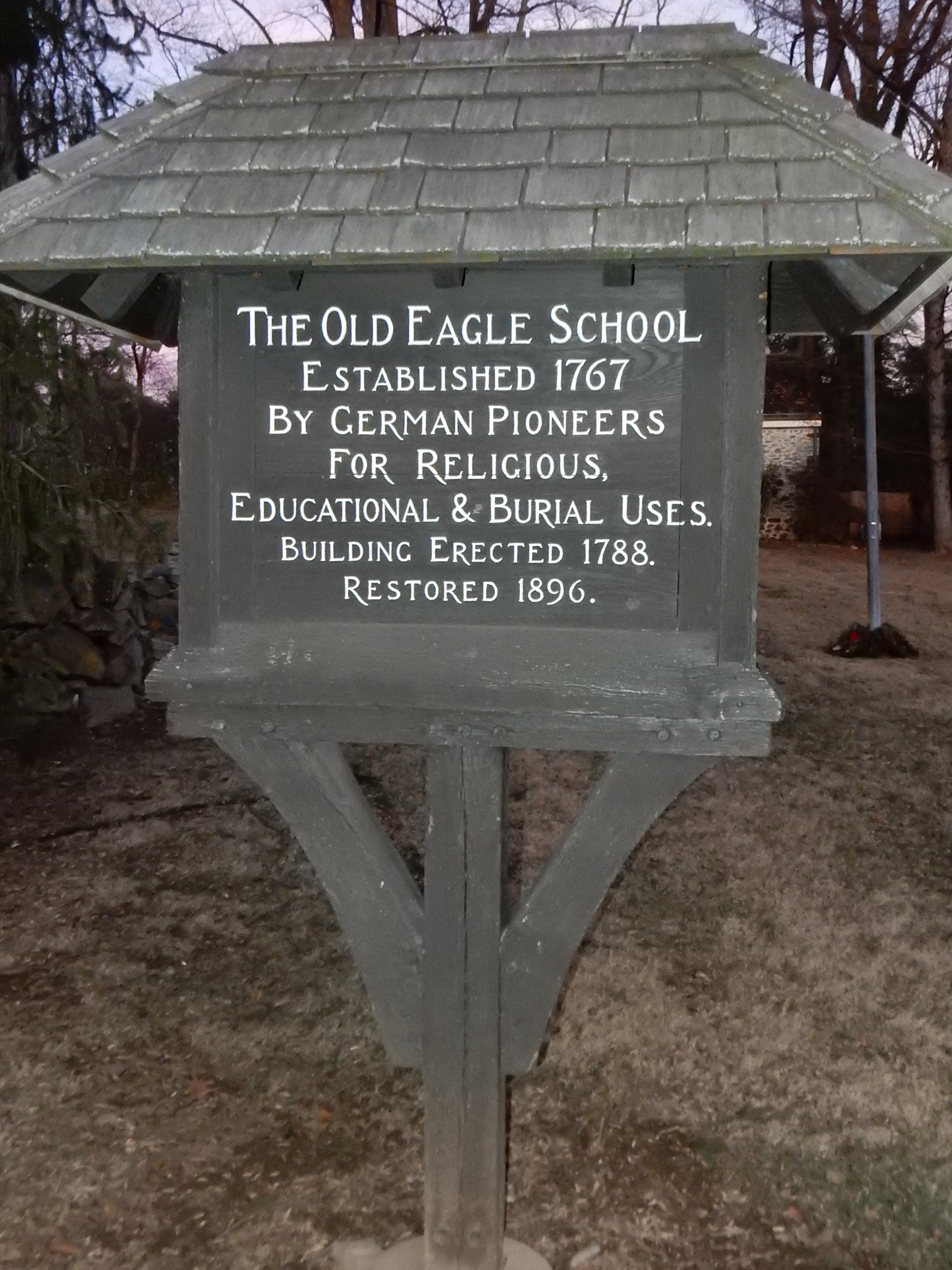
