= Tredyffrin/Easttown School District =

Public school district in Chester County, Pennsylvania

Address
- 940 West Valley Road, Suite 1700 Wayne, Chester, Pennsylvania, 19301; United States
- Coordinates: 40°04′11″N 75°25′29″W

District information
- Type: Public
- Motto: Inspiring the Future
- Grades: K-12
- Established: January 1909
- Superintendent: Dr. Richard Gusick
- Business administrator: Arthur J. McDonnell
- School board: 9 members
- Chair of the board: Sue Tiede
- Governing agency: Pennsylvania Department of Education
- Schools: 8, including Conestoga High School
- Budget: $146,038,639
- NCES District ID: 4223640

Students and staff
- Enrollment: 7,059
- Faculty: 489.2 (FTE)
- Staff: 218.5
- Athletic conference: PIAA
- Colors: Maroon and Grey

Other information
- Website: tesd.net

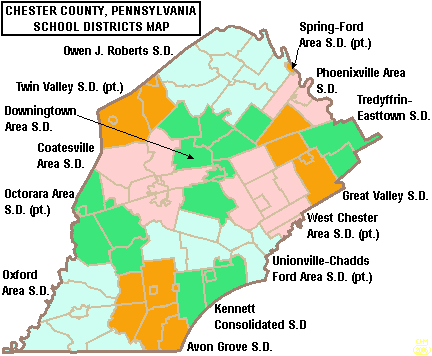
Map of Chester County, Pennsylvania public school districts. Tredyffrin/Easttown School District is in green in the eastern corner of the county.

Tredyffrin/Easttown School District (T/E in short) is a school district based in Tredyffrin Township, Chester County, Pennsylvania.

T/E School District serves the townships of Tredyffrin Township and Easttown Township, and is one of the several school districts serving the Philadelphia Main Line. T/E serves all or portions of several communities wholly or partly in the two townships, including the following census-designated places: Berwyn, Chesterbrook, Devon, and Paoli (partial). It also includes areas with Malvern, Phoenixville, and Wayne postal addresses that are outside of either the borough or census-designated place. Additional unincorporated communities within T/E include all or part of Daylesford, Strafford, and Radnor. In the 2010-2011 school year, the school district had 6,323 enrolled students.

In its most recent 2026 ranking, Niche.com ranked the T/E school district as the best among school districts in Pennsylvania. In the same year, Conestoga High School was ranked as the best public high school in Pennsylvania.

== History ==
The school district was the epicenter of the Berwyn School Fight, a 1930s boycott and legal campaign by the local Black community to resist the school boards' attempt to segregate the schools by race.

== Administration ==
The superintendent of schools is Dr. Richard Gusick.

== Schools ==
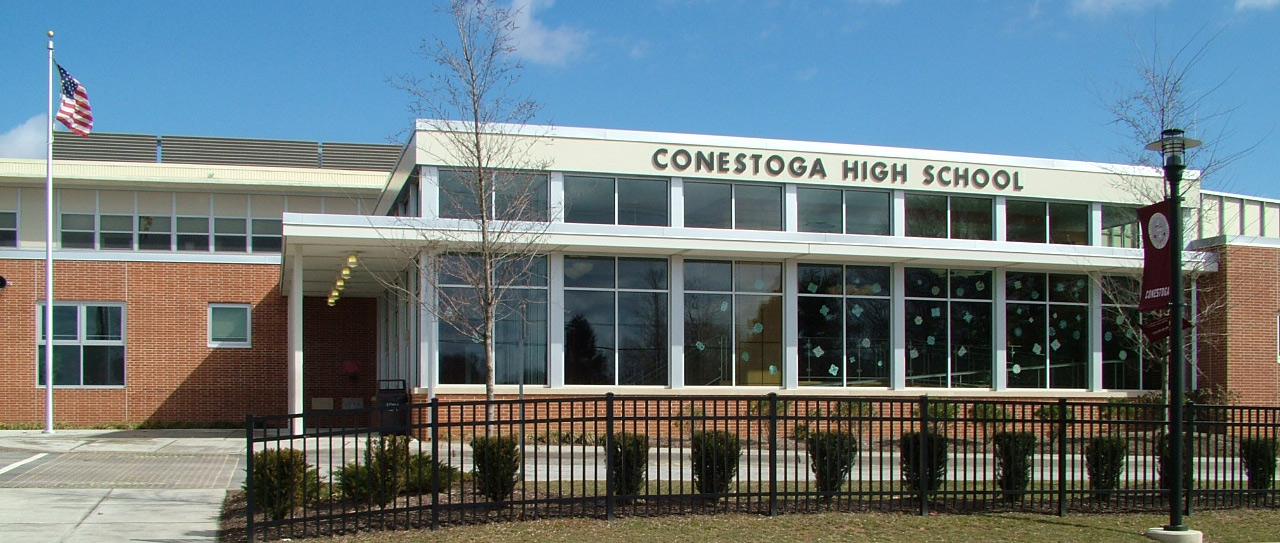
Conestoga High School

There is one high school, two middle schools, and five elementary schools in the Tredyffrin/Easttown School District.

=== High school ===
The school district has one high school, Conestoga High School, located in Tredyffrin Township.

=== Middle schools ===
The school district has two middle schools, both located in Tredyffrin Township:

- Tredyffrin/Easttown Middle School (TEMS, Tredyffrin Township, Berwyn address)
- Valley Forge Middle School (VFMS, Tredyffrin Township, Wayne address)

=== Elementary schools ===
There are two elementary schools in Easttown Township and three in Tredyffrin Township:

- Beaumont Elementary School (BES, Easttown Township, Devon address)
- Devon Elementary School (DES, Easttown Township, Devon address)
- Hillside Elementary School (HES, Tredyffrin Township, Berwyn address)
- New Eagle Elementary School (NEES, Tredyffrin Township, Wayne address)
- Valley Forge Elementary School (VFES, Tredyffrin Township, Wayne address)

Devon Elementary School and New Eagle Elementary School are National Blue Ribbon Schools.

A sixth elementary school, named Bear Hill Elementary School, has been planned and approved by the school board. The district has purchased property for the new school and the projected opening date is August 2027.

== See also ==
- List of school districts in Pennsylvania
