= Jonathan Greenert =

Retired U.S. Navy admiral, 30th Chief of Naval Operations (born 1953)

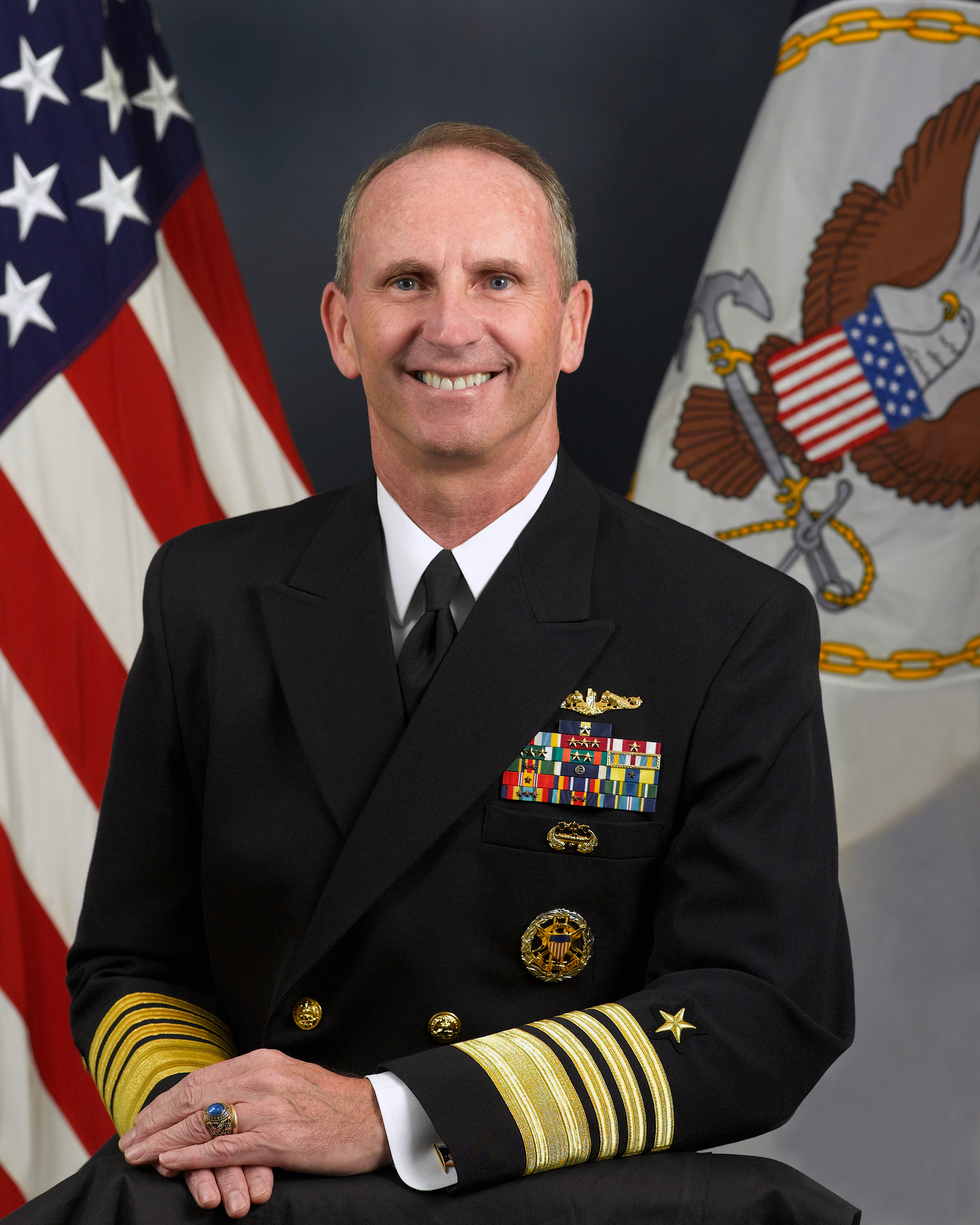
- Born: May 15, 1953 (age 73); Butler, Pennsylvania, US
- Military career
- Branch: United States Navy
- Service years: 1975–2015
- Rank: Admiral
- Commands: Chief of Naval Operations; Vice Chief of Naval Operations; United States Fleet Forces Command; United States Seventh Fleet; Submarine Squadron 11; United States Naval Forces Marianas; USS Honolulu
- Awards: Defense Distinguished Service Medal; Navy Distinguished Service Medal (6); Army Distinguished Service Medal; Air Force Distinguished Service Medal; Coast Guard Distinguished Service Medal; Defense Superior Service Medal; Legion of Merit (4)

Jonathan William Greenert (born May 15, 1953) is a former United States Navy admiral who served as the 30th Chief of Naval Operations from September 23, 2011, to September 18, 2015. He previously served as the 36th Vice Chief of Naval Operations from August 13, 2009, to August 22, 2011. Prior to that, he served as Commander, U.S. Fleet Forces Command from September 29, 2007, to July 29, 2009, deputy chief of Naval Operations for Integration of Capabilities and Resources from September 2006 to September 2007, and commander of U.S. Seventh Fleet from August 2004 to September 2006. He retired from the navy after over 40 years of service. In March 2016, the National Bureau of Asian Research announced that Greenert would become the third holder of the John M. Shalikashvili Chair in National Security Studies (Shali Chair) at NBR. In April 2016, Greenert was appointed to the board of directors for BAE Systems for a three-year term.

== Early life and education ==
Born in the Pittsburgh suburb of Butler, Pennsylvania, on May 15, 1953, Greenert attended Butler Catholic School and Butler Senior High School. While in high school, he participated in Pennsylvania Keystone Boys State, an American Legion leadership program. He graduated from the United States Naval Academy in 1975 with a Bachelor of Science degree in ocean engineering and completed studies in nuclear power for service as a submarine officer.

== Naval career ==
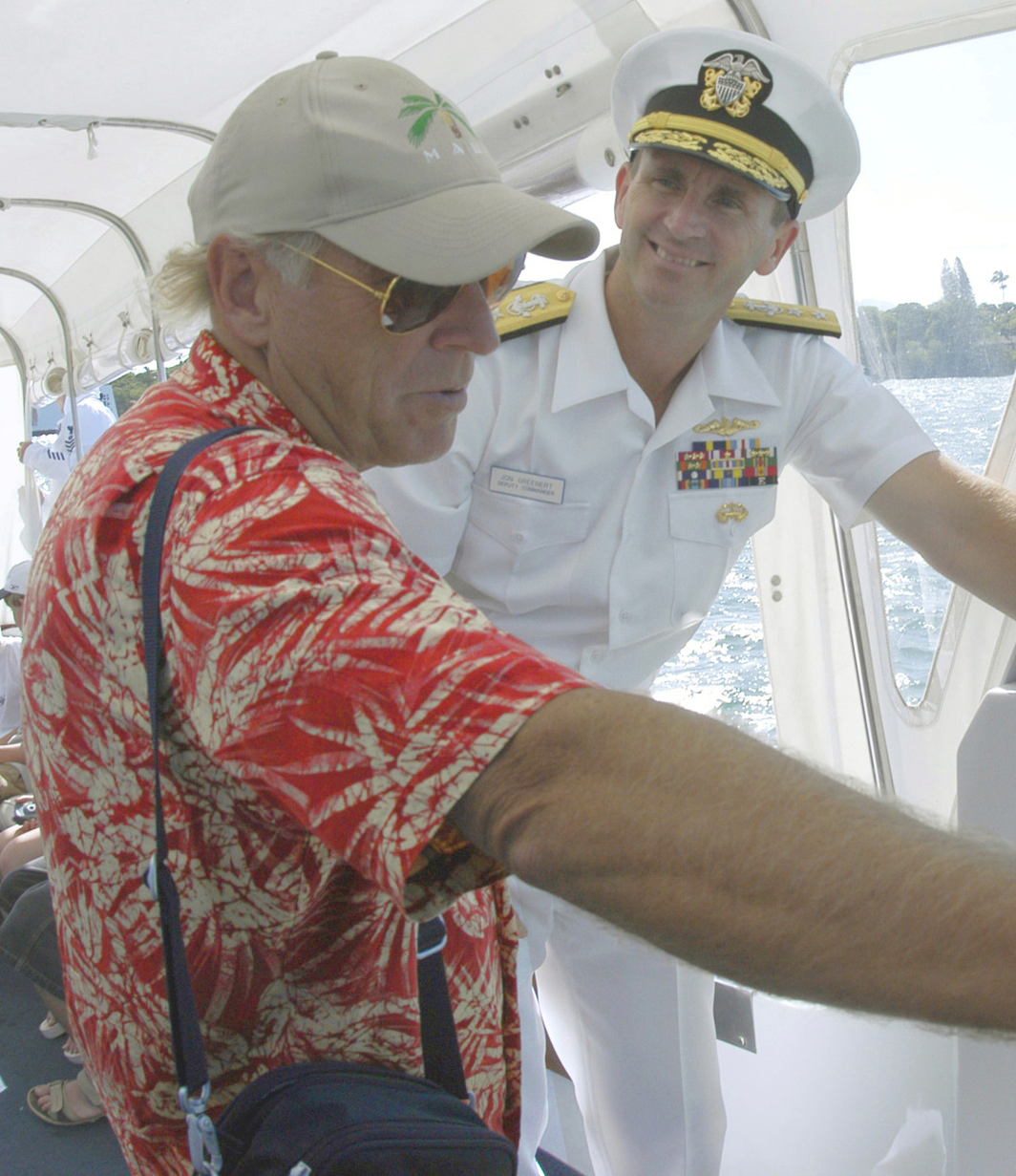
Greenert escorting Jimmy Buffett on a tour of Pearl Harbor in June 2003.

Greenert's career as a submariner included assignments on board USS Flying Fish as electrical material officer, USS Tautog as electrical/operations officer, and submarine NR-1 as engineer officer. He served as executive officer of USS Michigan's Gold Crew before taking command of USS Honolulu in March 1991. In 1992, he was awarded the Vice Admiral James Bond Stockdale Award for Inspirational Leadership by the commander of United States Pacific Fleet.

Following his command at sea, Greenert served as commander of Submarine Squadron 11, and Commander, Submarine Forces Pacific (COMSUBPAC) Representative West Coast from July 1996 to June 1997.

=== Flag assignments ===
In July 1997, Greenert reported as chief of staff for Commander, United States Seventh Fleet, in Yokosuka, Japan. During his tour in Japan, he was selected for flag rank and subsequently served as commander of United States Pacific Command, representative to Micronesia/Commander, U.S. Naval Forces, Marianas, from October 1998 through December 1999. On August 6, 2004, Greenert assumed command of Seventh Fleet.

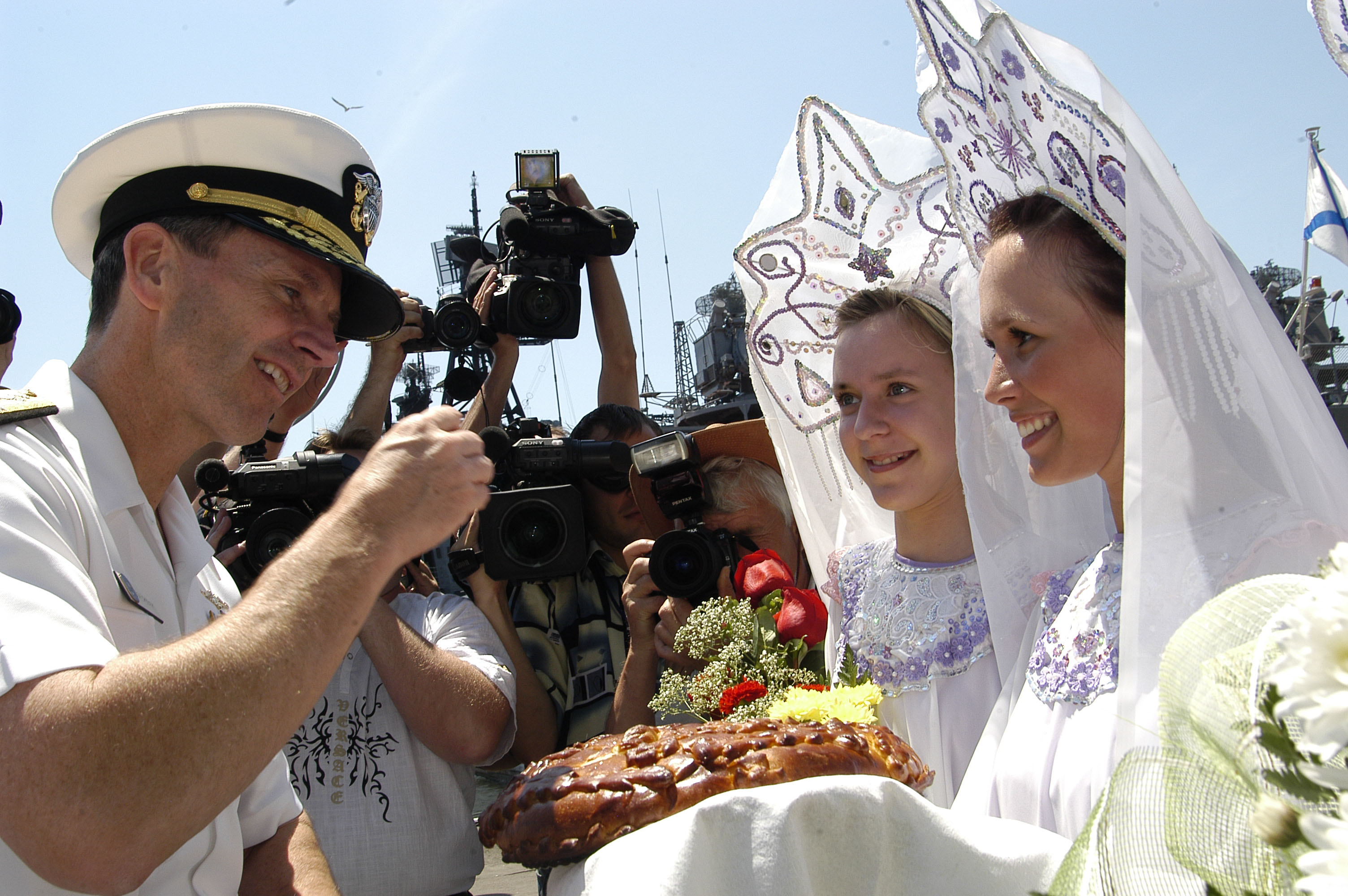
Greenert takes part in a bread and salt ceremony, a traditional Slavic welcoming ceremony, after arriving in Vladivostok, Russia, July 3, 2006.

Greenert's shore assignments include tours as COMSUBPAC staff fire control officer, program analyst for Office of the Chief of Naval Operations and the Chief of Naval Operations Strategic Studies Group and head of Navy Program Planning and Development Branch for the Chief of Naval Operations Staff in Washington, D.C. He served as director of the Operations Division in the Navy Comptroller Office from January 2000 through August 2002, and as deputy and chief of staff of U.S. Pacific Fleet from August 2002 until July 2004.

On September 23, 2011, Greenert became the 30th Chief of Naval Operations, succeeding Admiral Gary Roughead.

== Post-retirement ==
On March 3, 2016, the National Bureau of Asian Research announced that Greenert would become the third holder of the John M. Shalikashvili Chair in National Security Studies (Shali Chair) at NBR. At NBR, Greenert brings to bear his years of experience in the U.S. Navy to help inform policy debates on critical issues pertaining to the Asia-Pacific through briefings of senior leaders, and research and writing.

The board chairman of Arlington-based BAE Systems Inc., Michael Chertoff, a former secretary of Homeland Security, announced on April 19, 2016, that retired Greenert was appointed to the board of directors for BAE Systems for a three-year term. "Admiral Greenert brings a wealth of knowledge and expertise from a distinguished, 40-year career as a senior military officer and government leader," Chertoff said in a statement. "His experience in management, operations, and strategic planning will be highly valuable, and I'm pleased to welcome him to the board."

== Awards and decorations ==

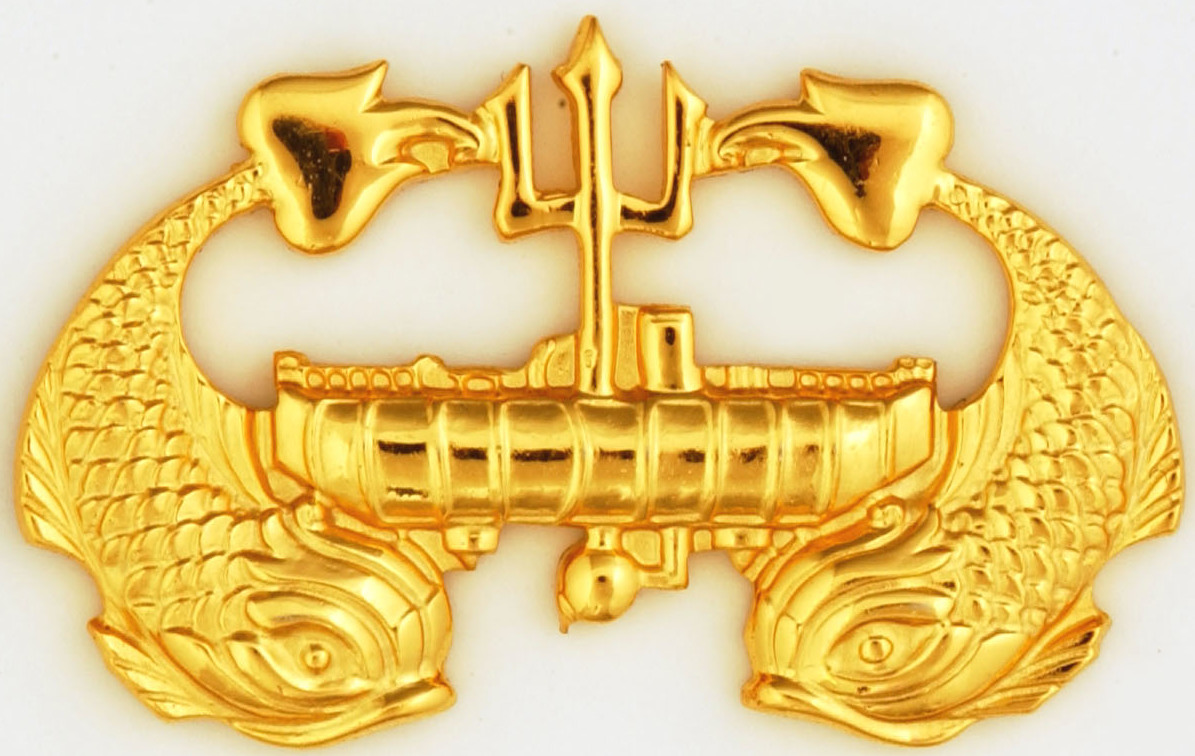

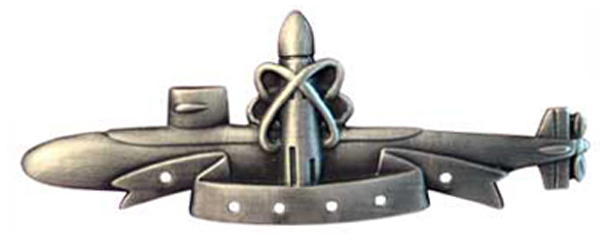

Submarine Warfare insignia (Officer)
Defense Distinguished Service Medal
Navy Distinguished Service Medal with 1 silver award star	Army Distinguished Service Medal	Air Force Distinguished Service Medal
Coast Guard Distinguished Service Medal	Defense Superior Service Medal	Legion of Merit with 3 award stars
Meritorious Service Medal with 1 award star	Navy and Marine Corps Commendation Medal with 3 award stars	Navy and Marine Corps Achievement Medal with 2 award stars
Joint Meritorious Unit Award	Navy Meritorious Unit Commendation with 2 bronze service stars	Navy "E" Ribbon with Wreathed Battle E device
Navy Expeditionary Medal with 1 service star	National Defense Service Medal with 1 service star	Global War on Terrorism Service Medal
Korea Defense Service Medal	Navy Sea Service Deployment Ribbon with 3 service stars	Navy & Marine Corps Overseas Service Ribbon with 2 service stars
Special Operations Service Ribbon	Meritorious Service Medal (Military) (Singapore) May 13, 2013	Grand Cordon of the Order of the Rising Sun (Japan) May 26, 2014
Commander of the Order of Naval Merit (Brazil) September 16, 2014	Grand Cross of the Order of Naval Merit Admiral Padilla (Colombia) January 18, 2015	Navy Expert Pistol Shot Medal
Officer Deep Submergence insignia
Silver SSBN Deterrent Patrol insignia with two gold stars
Office of the Joint Chiefs of Staff Identification Badge

== Family ==
Greenert is married to Darleen Greenert, who was the Sponsor for the pre-commissioning unit (PCU) USS Hyman G. Rickover (SSN-795), and christened the ship during a ceremony at General Dynamics Electric Boat shipyard facility in Groton, Connecticut, on 31 July 2021.

Military offices
Preceded by Robert F. Willard	Commander of the United States Seventh Fleet; 2004–2006	Succeeded by William D. Crowder
Preceded by Lewis W. Crenshaw Jr.	Deputy Chief of Naval Operations for Integration of Capabilities and Resources; 2006–2007	Succeeded by Bernard J. McCullough III
Preceded by Gary Roughead	Commander of United States Fleet Forces Command; 2007–2009	Succeeded by John C. Harvey Jr.
Preceded by Patrick Walsh	Vice Chief of Naval Operations; 2009–2011	Succeeded by Mark E. Ferguson III
Preceded by Gary Roughead	Chief of Naval Operations; 2011–2015	Succeeded by John M. Richardson
