= Vice Admiral James Bond Stockdale Award for Inspirational Leadership =

The Vice Admiral James Bond Stockdale Award for Inspirational Leadership is a United States Navy award established in 1980 by United States Secretary of the Navy Edward Hidalgo to honor the inspirational leadership of James Stockdale, a Medal of Honor recipient in the Vietnam War, who exhibited exemplary leadership while a prisoner of war in North Vietnam for nearly eight years. The award was first presented in 1981.

== Award criteria ==
Each year two commanding officers of either a surface warship, aviation squadron, submarine, or SEAL team below the grade of Captain are selected, one for the United States Atlantic Fleet and one from the United States Pacific Fleet. A board of peer-nominated officers, one from the Atlantic and one for the Pacific, select the winners, based on the five criteria of inspirational leadership that Vice Admiral Stockdale identified in his writing and teaching on leadership. These criteria are:

- Moralist: Have a commitment to a personal code of ethical conduct.
- Jurist: Demonstrate ability to establish policy which can be implemented and obeyed in the most difficult of circumstances.
- Teacher: Being an example of self-discipline and sensitivity to others with balanced perspective, creating organizational pride, job satisfaction, and a motivational climate.
- Steward: Being an example of personal commitment and an example to others in the maintenance of standards and loyalty.
- Philosopher: Show the ability to reason, explain the essence of reality, and recognize the need for forethought in dealing with uncertainty.

== Award winners ==
Year	Atlantic	Pacific	Ref.
1981	CDR John J. Coonan	CDR Philip M. Qwast	
1982	CDR E.L. Watkins	CDR G.R. Fister	
1983	CDR J.B. Johnston	CDR William J. Hancock	
1984	CDR Frank L. Yusi	CDR Edward K. Kristensen	
1985	CDR Larry L. Ernst	CDR W. Hudson	
1986	CDR M.A. Rogers	CDR B.J. Coyle	
1987	CDR C.W. Moore	CDR Michael Mullen	
1988	CDR W.J. Riffer	CDR J. Grossenbacher	
1989	CDR R.M. Wikstrom	CDR Thomas B. Fargo	
1990	CDR J.C. Holloway	CDR A.R. Gorthy	
1991	CDR F.J. Dobrydney	CDR T.L. Travis	
1992	CDR B.W. Cavey	CDR Jonathan W. Greenert	
1993	No Award	CDR C.A. Miletich	
1994	CDR R.D. Jenkins	CDR R.C. Massey	
1995	CDR J.T. Bader	CDR F.M. Drennan	
1996	CDR R.D. Holland	CDR James P. Wisecup	
1997	CDR J.L. Clark	CDR M.W. Kenny	
1998	CDR M.E. Kosnick	CDR Cecil D. Haney	
1999	CDR Walter E. Carter Jr.	CDR Bruce E. Grooms	
2000	CDR M.D. Davis	CDR R. Hennegan	
2001	CDR Jeffery Scott Jones	CDR John M. Richardson	
2002	CDR Peter H. Young	CDR John W. Covell	
2003	CDR Kevin J. Kovacich	CDR Charles M. Gaouette	
2004	CDR Scott D. Conn	CDR Lee R. Hankins	
2005	CDR Robert P. Burke	CDR James W. Kilby	
2006	CDR Richard L. Clemmons	CDR Brian T. Howes	
2007	CDR Frank J. Olmo	CDR Craig A. Clapperton	
2008	CDR Robert Smith	CDR Paul J. Lyons	
2009	CDR William J. Parker III	CDR Robert A. Baughman	
2010	CDR Jeffrey M. Grimes	CDR Michael A. McCartney	
2011	CDR Robert B. Chadwick II	CDR Gerald N. Miranda, Jr.	
2012	CDR Brian L. Sittlow	CDR Chase D. Patrick	
2013	CDR Leif E. Mollo	CDR Richard N. Massie	
2014	CDR Thomas J. Dickinson	CDR Gavin Duff	
2015	CDR Anthony S. Grayson	CDR Matthew J. Duffy	
2016	CDR Ken J. Kleinschnittger	CDR Gary G. Montalvo	
2017	CDR Eric M. Sager	CDR Brian M. Drechsler	
2018	CDR Allen M. Siegrist	CDR Michael T. Lisa	
2019	CDR Patrick O’Loughlin	CDR Carl Trask	
2020	CDR William H. Wiley	CDR Bradley D. Geary	
2021	CDR Ronald H. Rumfelt	CDR Steven C. Lawrence	
2022	CDR Adam J. Thomas	CDR John W. Keefe	
2023	CDR David B. Burke	CDR Jeffrey C. Fassbender	
2024	CDR Justin B. Smith	CDR Jason M. Garfield	
2025	CDR Desmond Walker	CDR Joseph Campbell	

== Gallery ==
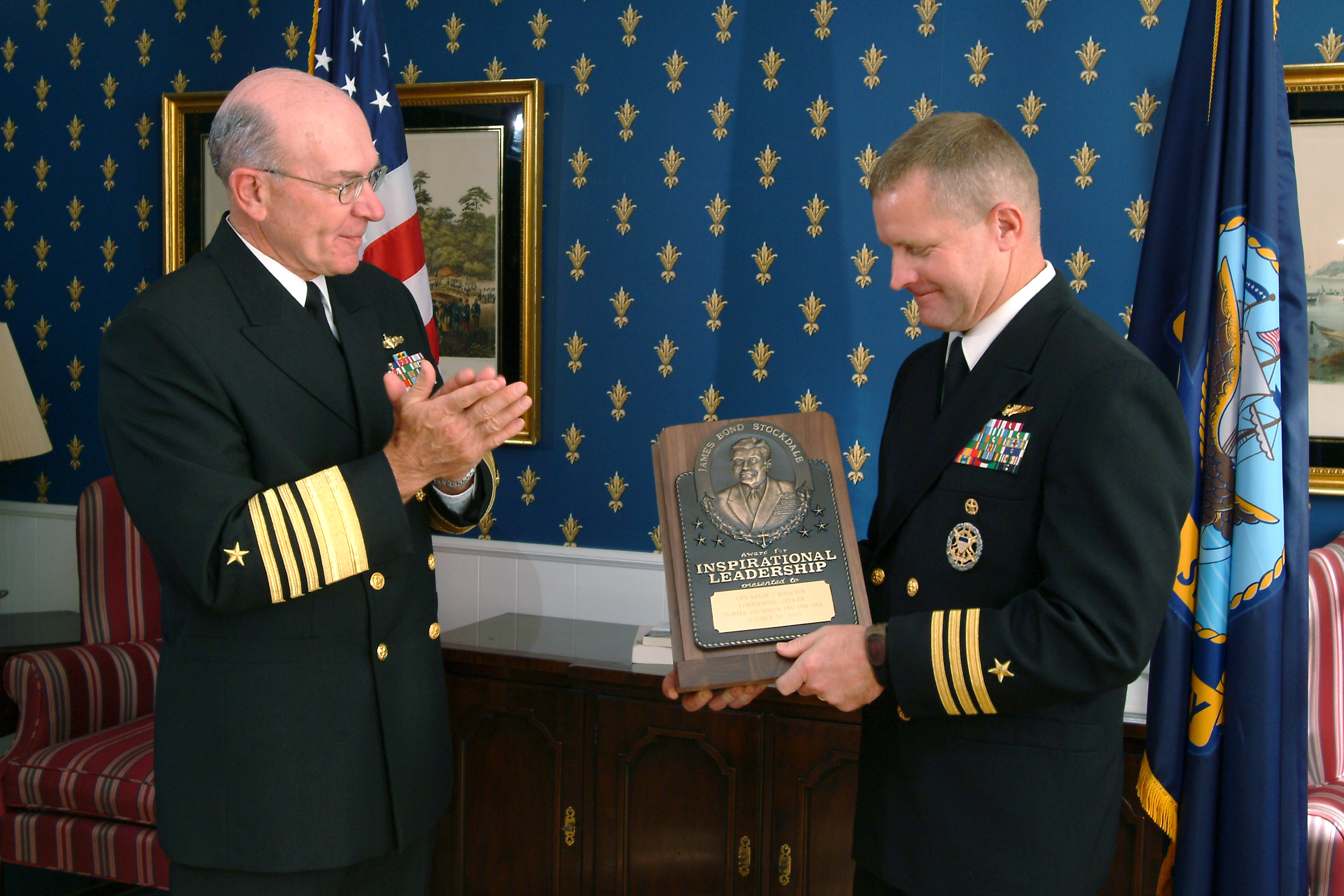
Kevin J. Kovacich (2003)

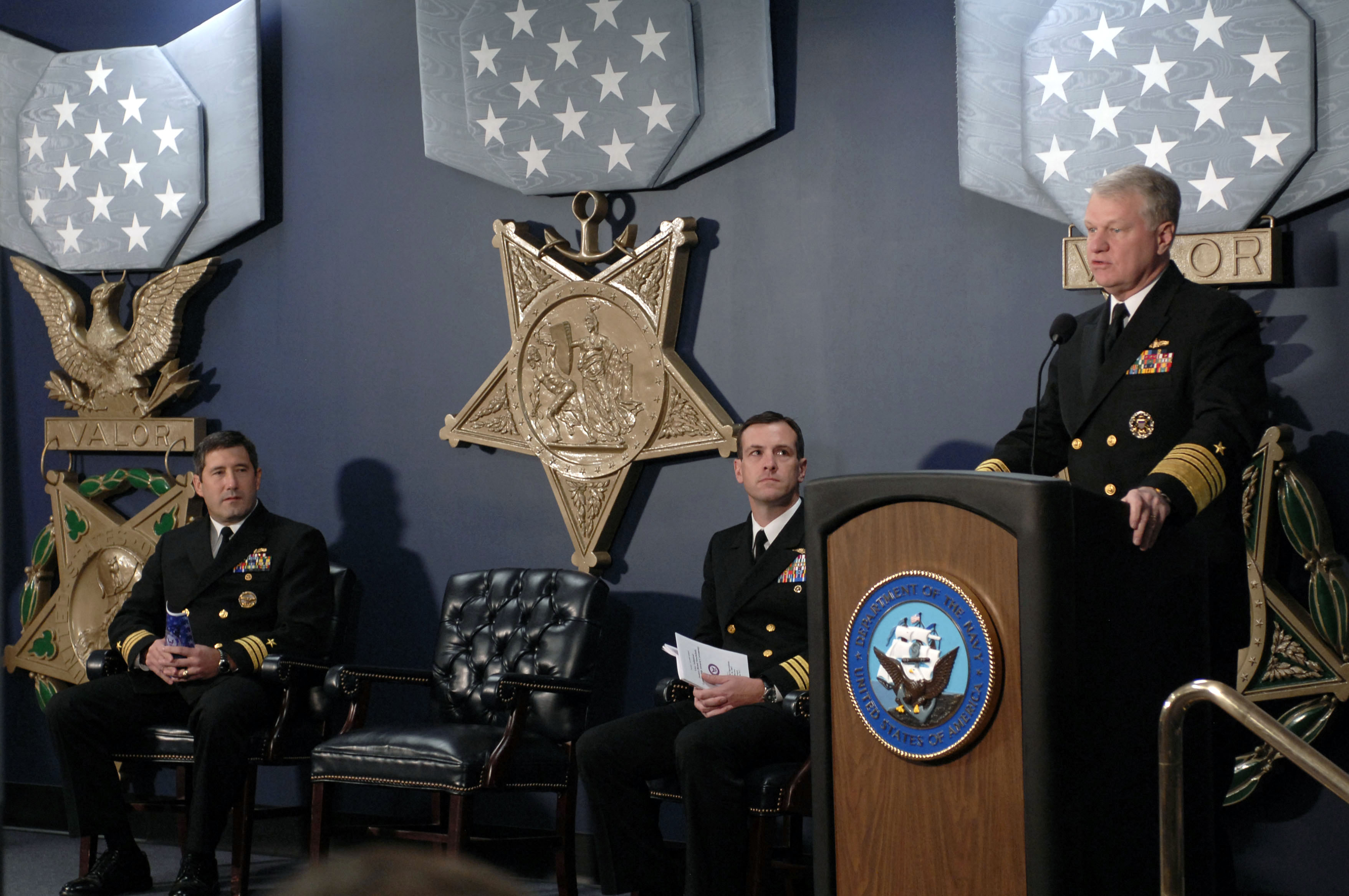
2007

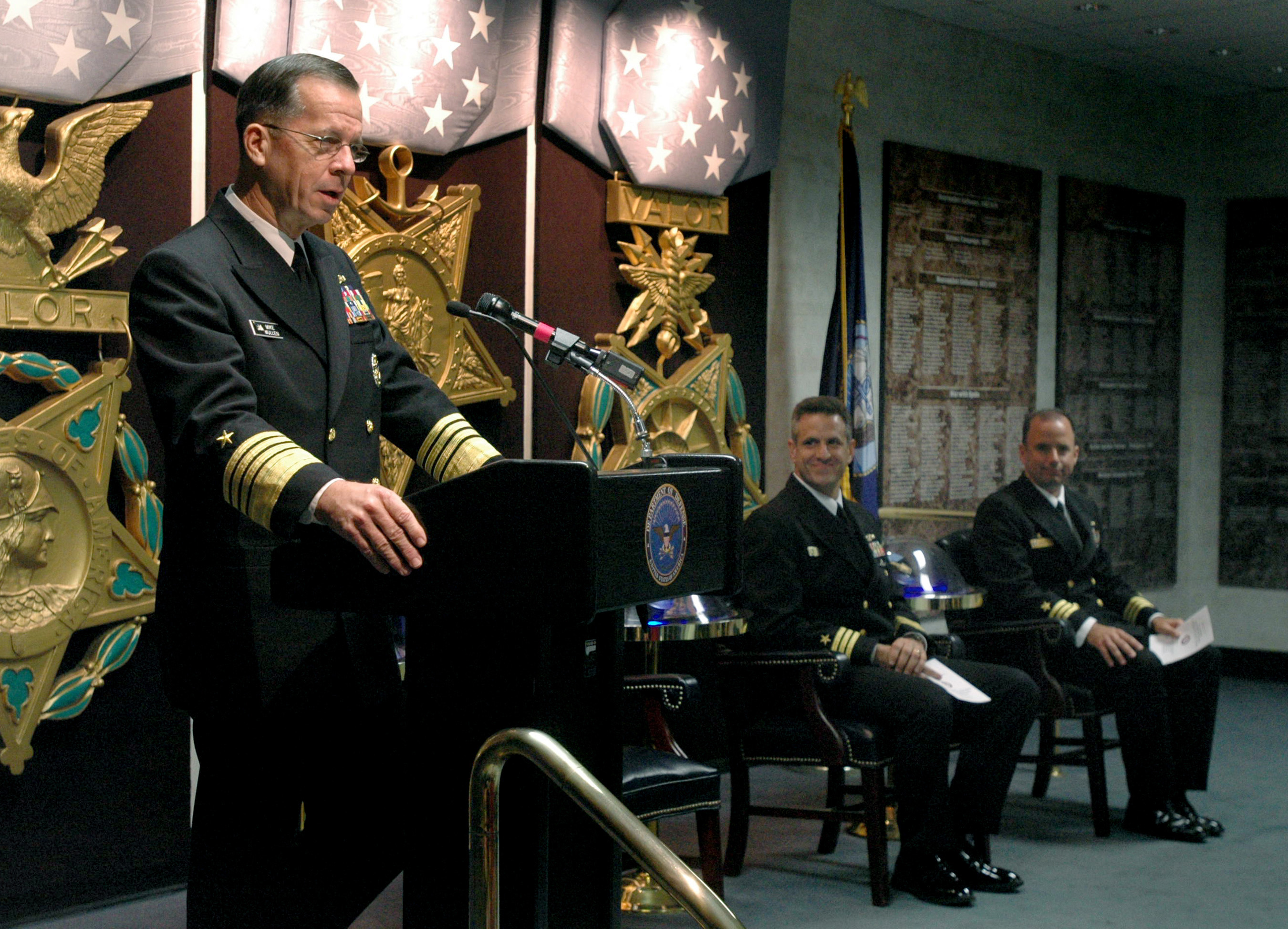
2005

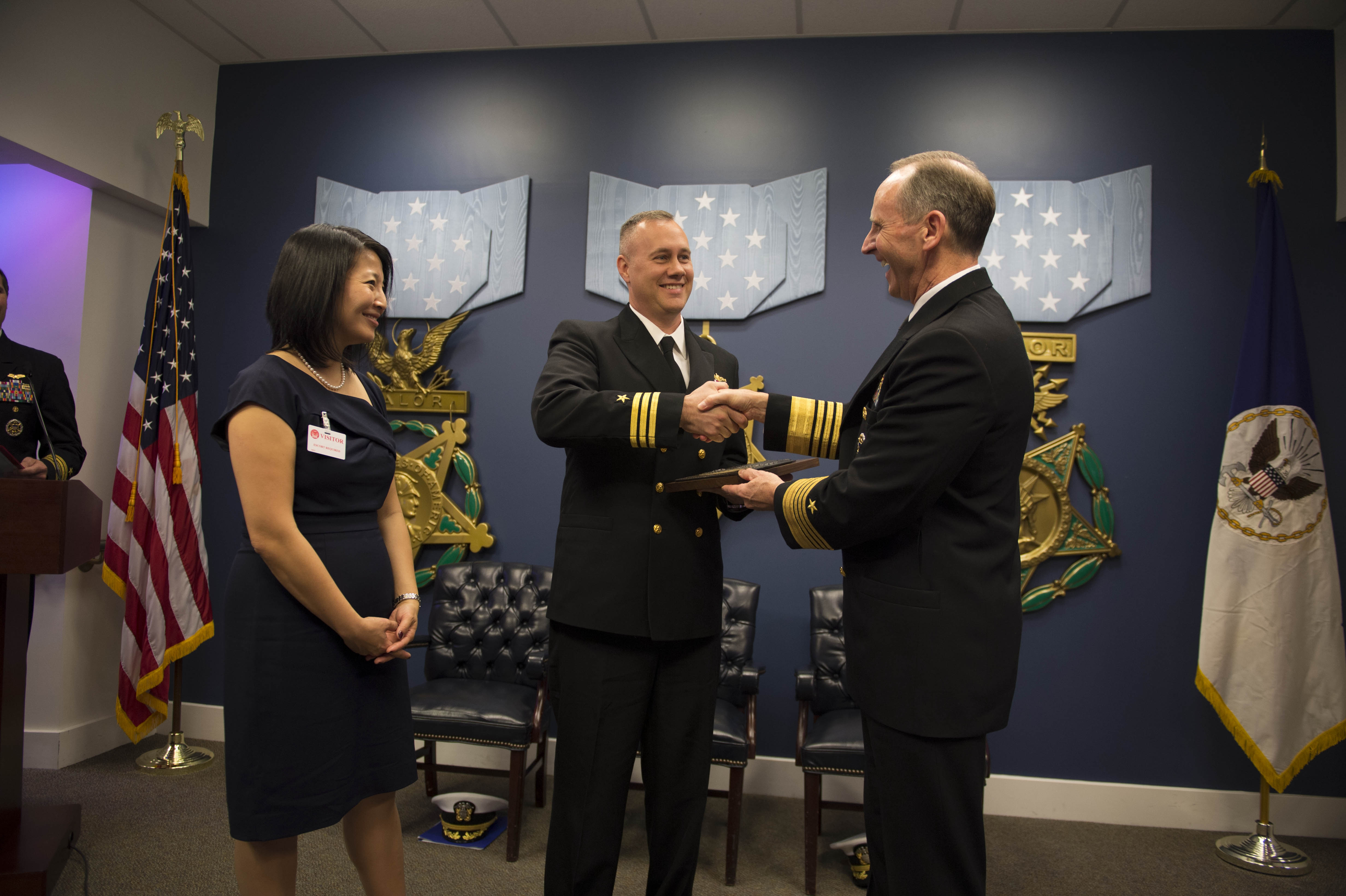
2012
