= Chief of Naval Operations Strategic Studies Group =

U.S. Navy organization

The Chief of Naval Operations Strategic Studies Group (SSG) was established by Chief of Naval Operations Admiral Thomas B. Hayward in 1981. The Group was co-located at the United States Naval War College in Newport, Rhode Island, and received its direction and made its reports only to the Chief of Naval Operations. The SSG was disestablished in 2016 by the Chief of Naval Operations (CNO) Admiral John Richardson.

== Mission ==
The mission of the Strategic Studies Group was to "generate revolutionary naval warfare concepts. Revolutionary implies that the concepts would upset the existing order. Therefore, these concepts are non-consensual. The SSG focuses its efforts on warfighting concepts that appear to have great potential, but Navy organizations are currently not pursuing. In conducting this mission, the SSG is at the leading edge of the Conceptualization Phase of the Process for Naval Warfare Innovation."

== Process ==
Early groups contributed broadly to the foundation of maritime strategy, with later groups shifting more broadly to national security and military strategy. In 1995, Admiral Boorda transformed the SSG into a group whose sole mission is the generation of revolutionary naval warfare concepts. The process for this effort includes: exploring innovations in naval warfighting; developing warfighting concepts; underpinning these concepts with technologies; establishing criteria to evaluate these concepts in operational experiments; and recommending actions to the CNO. While the SSG title remained, the Group was more appropriately characterized as an "Operational Research and Concept Development Center."

The CNO personally selected Navy Fellows and invited the Chief of Staff of the Air Force, and Commandants of the Marine Corps and Coast Guard to nominate officers to serve as Fellows. The Fellows served 10-12 month assignments. The President of the Naval War College and the President of the Naval Postgraduate School worked with the SSG's Director in selection of Associate Fellows, later named Director Fellows, to serve 6-7 month assignments. Technology Fellows, providing scientific and analytical expertise, were nominated by the Navy's Systems Commands and Laboratories to the SSG's Director. They serve for two years, and then return to their parent organizations. Operators, scientists, and analysts working in collaboration is a powerful approach for developing warfighting innovations.

At the October start of the annual study, the CNO Fellows, typically post-Major Command O-6 officers, would spend a few weeks doing non-traditional training. This included visiting the nearby Rhode Island School of Design and Brown University, lectures on a wide range of non-defense topics, and other activities to help expand the mindset of career-military officers to be more open to a diversity of thought and, more generally, provide exposure to conceptual thinking. The next two to three months were spent being introduced to future warfare implications and technological opportunities through interactions with senior military, business, and academic leaders, and through visits to military, scientific, and commercial organizations. In December, the Director Fellows would arrive, and the entire Group developed an overarching operational concept that was consistent with the CNO's theme for the study, and formed Concept Teams to pursue its research and concept generation work. Research and concept generation by the teams would occur for the next several months, culminating in a written study, often accompanied by other media (e.g. videos, briefings, etc.), presented directly to the CNO and then to a variety of senior Navy commanders.

== Directors ==
- The Hon. Robert J. Murray, SSG I-II, 1981 - 1983
- Dr. Robert S. Wood, SSG III-IV, 1984 - 1985
- Ambassador Marshall Brement, SSG V-VIII, 1986 - 1991
- The Hon. Robert B. Pirie, Jr., SSG IX-XI, 1991 - 1992
- Ambassador Francis J. McNeil, SSG XII-XIV, 1993 - 1995
- Admiral James R. Hogg, SSG XV to XXXII, 1995 - 2013
- Vice Admiral James P. Wisecup, SSG 33 to 35, 2013 - 2016

== Strategic Studies Group Fellows ==
Former SSG Fellows include a wide range of officers who have later risen to the flag and general officer ranks.

- List of Fellows

== External Source ==
- CNO Strategic Studies Group webpage
- Leadership, Creativity, Military Innovation, and Future Warfighting: An Oral History of Admiral James R. Hogg, USN (Ret.), While Serving as Director of the CNO Strategic Studies Group from 1995 to 2013
