= Gary Roughead =

United States admiral

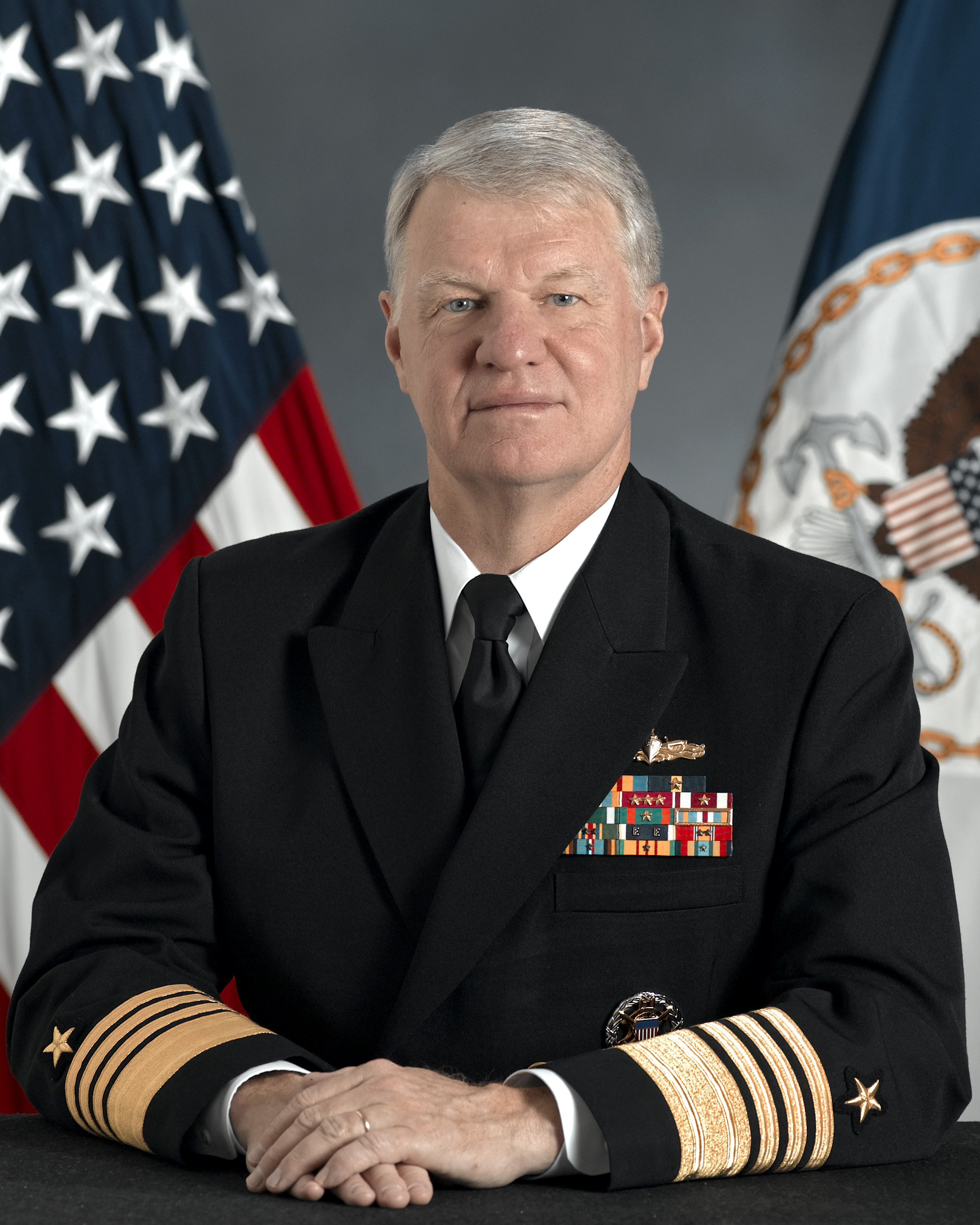
- Roughead in September 2007
- Born: July 15, 1951 (age 75); Buffalo, New York, U.S.
- Military career
- Allegiance: United States
- Branch: United States Navy
- Service years: 1973–2011
- Rank: Admiral
- Commands: Chief of Naval Operations; United States Fleet Forces Command; United States Pacific Fleet; United States Second Fleet; USS Port Royal (CG-73); USS Barry (DDG-52)
- Conflicts: Vietnam War
- Awards: Defense Distinguished Service Medal; Navy Distinguished Service Medal (2); Army Distinguished Service Medal; Defense Superior Service Medal; Legion of Merit (4)

Gary Roughead (/ˈrʌfhɛd/ ruf-HED; born July 15, 1951) is a former United States Navy officer who served as the 29th Chief of Naval Operations from 2007 to 2011. He previously served as Commander, United States Fleet Forces Command from May 17 to September 29, 2007. Prior to that, Roughead served as the 31st Commander, United States Pacific Fleet from 2005 to 2007. In 2011, he retired from the U.S. Navy after 38 years of service.

== Early life and education ==
Roughhead was born July 15, 1951, in Buffalo, New York. Roughead graduated from high school at Valley Forge Military Academy in Wayne, Pennsylvania, in 1969. He is a 1973 graduate of the United States Naval Academy and a Surface Warfare Officer.

== Career ==
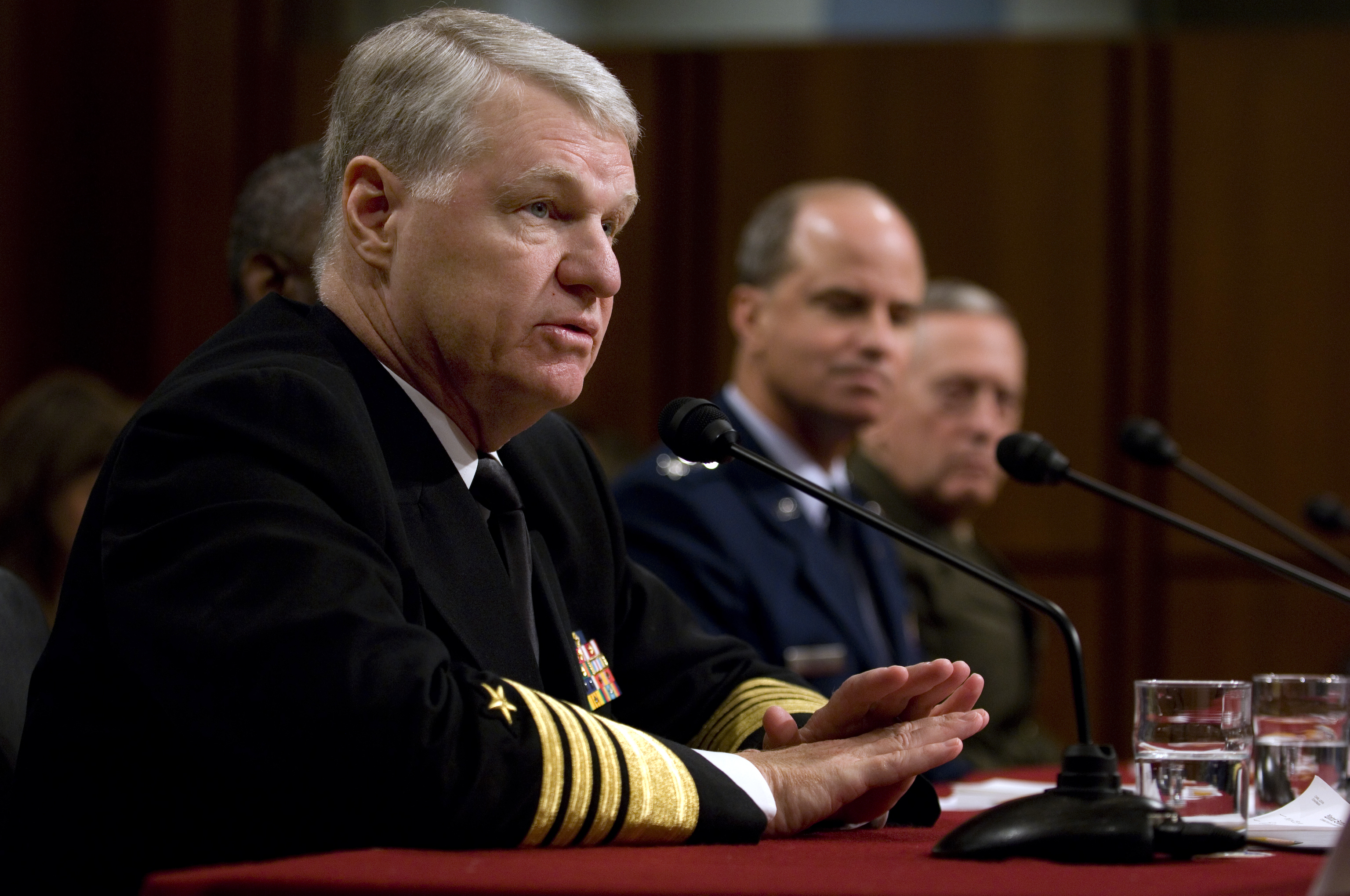
Roughead during his Committee on Armed Forces confirmation hearing in the U.S. Senate for appointment to Chief of Naval Operations in September 2007

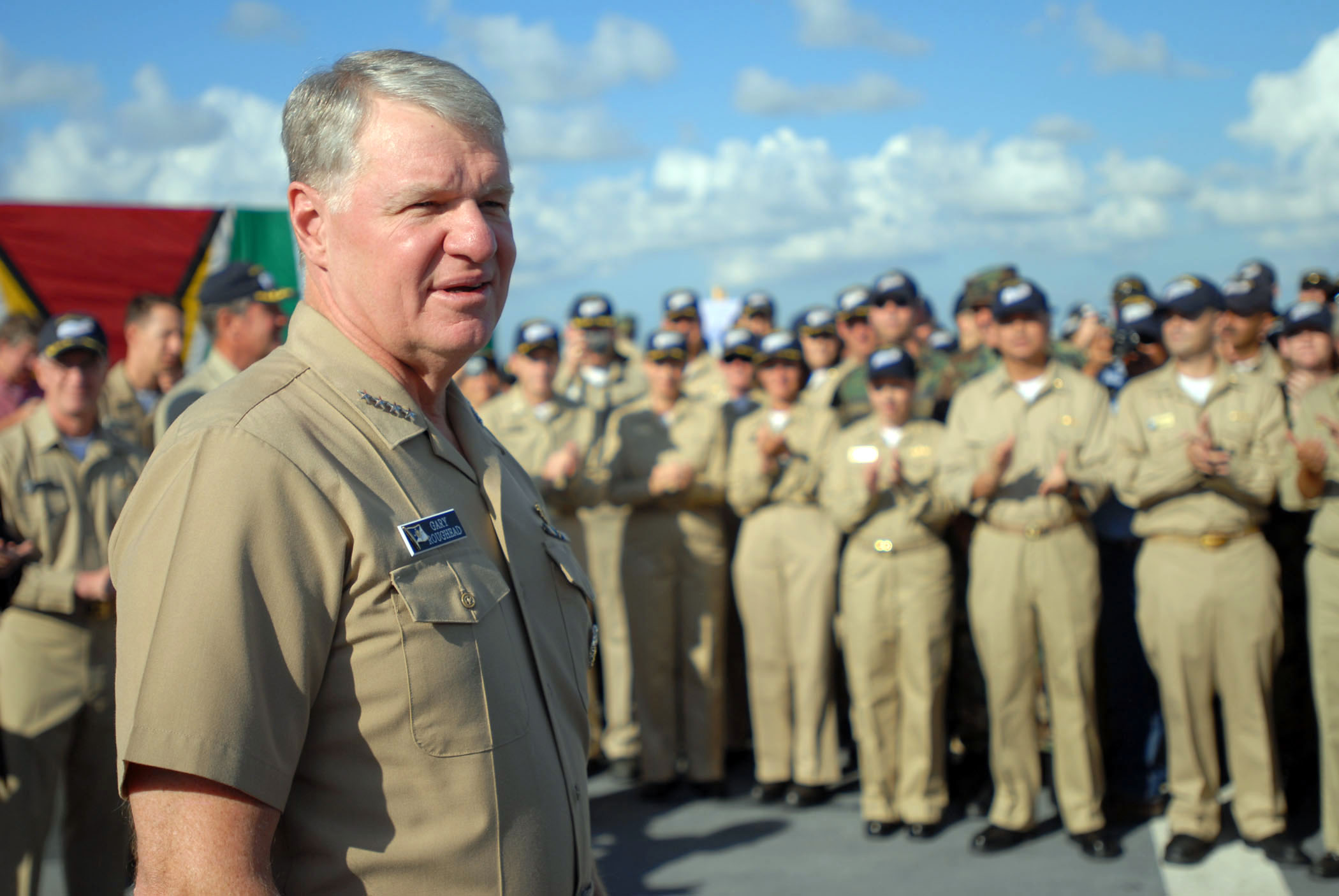
Roughead speaking with crew members aboard USNS Comfort in October 2007

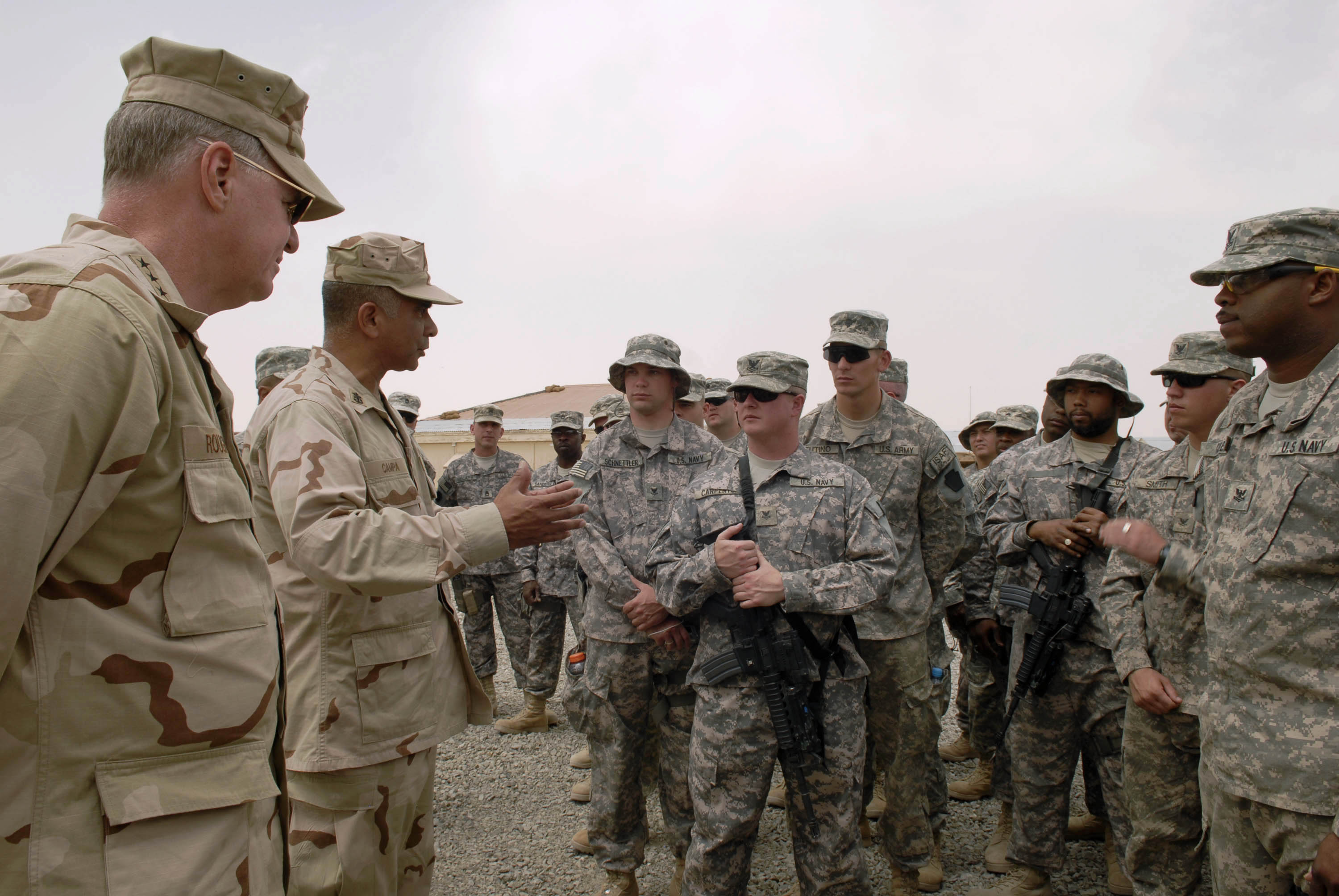
Roughead and Master Chief Petty Officer Joe R. Campa in Afghanistan in August 2008

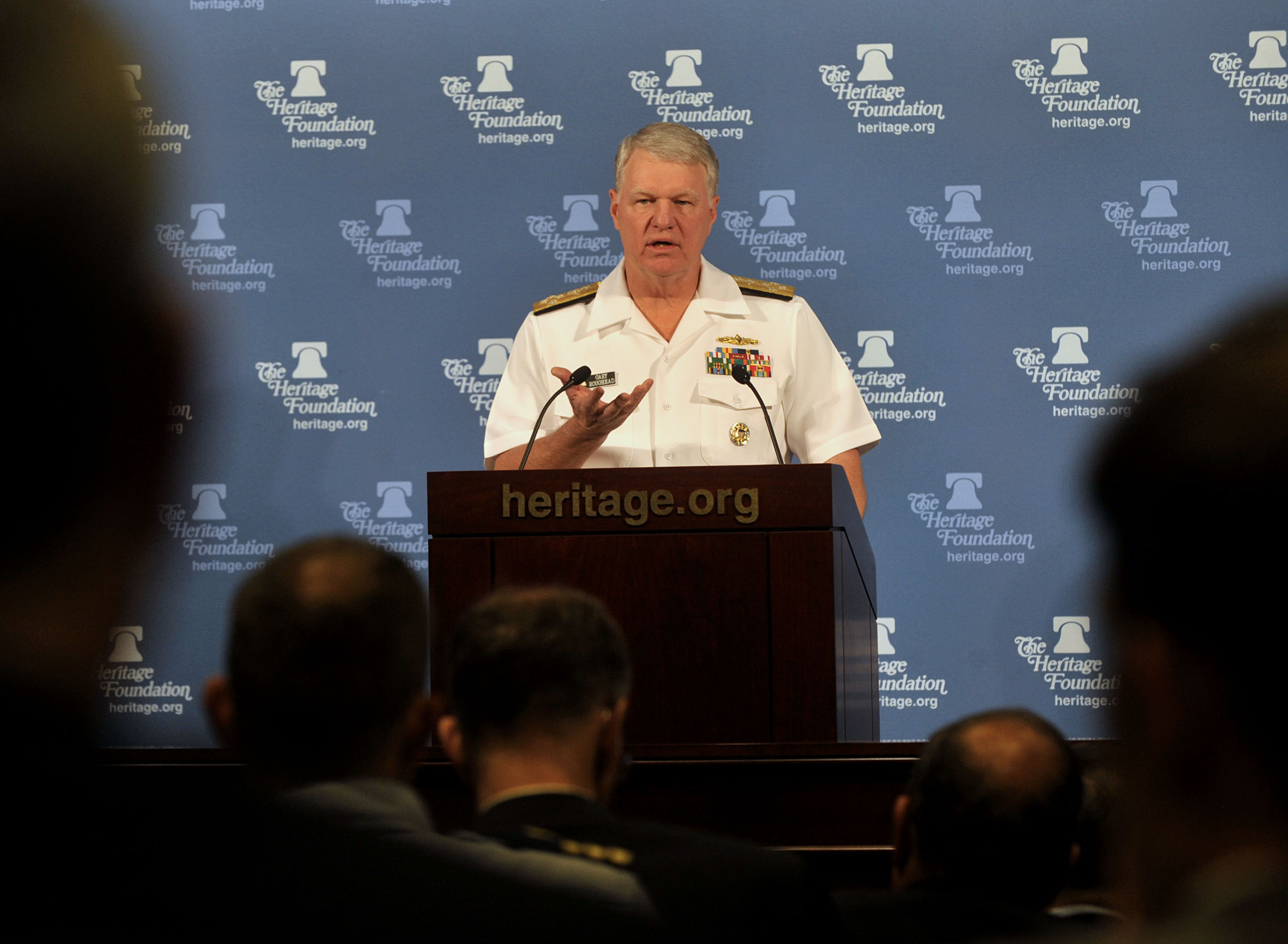
Roughead speaking at The Heritage Foundation in May 2010

Roughead's initial assignment was in the Weapons Department aboard USS Josephus Daniels (CG-27). This was followed by duty as executive officer on the patrol gunboats USS Douglas (PGM-100) and USS Tacoma (PGM-92), the former home-ported in Naples, Italy. He was the commissioning chief engineer aboard USS O'Bannon (DD-987) and executive officer on board USS Spruance (DD-963).

Roughead's tours ashore include assignments as flag lieutenant to the Commander, Naval Surface Force Atlantic in the United States Atlantic Fleet, the Surface Warfare Analyst at the Navy's Office of Program Appraisal, administrative aide to the U.S. Secretary of the Navy, executive assistant to the Commander, Naval Surface Force Pacific, commandant, United States Naval Academy, the Department of the Navy's chief of legislative affairs; and deputy commander, United States Pacific Command.

Roughead was the commissioning commanding officer of the Aegis Combat System destroyer USS Barry (DDG-52), and, upon assuming command of the cruiser USS Port Royal (CG-73), he became the first naval officer to command both classes of Aegis ships. While he was in command, Port Royal was awarded a Meritorious Unit Commendation and received the Golden Anchor Award for excellence in retention and crew support programs. He was Commander, Cruiser Destroyer Group Two and the USS George Washington (CVN-73) Carrier Battle Group, deploying to the Persian Gulf and Mediterranean Sea. His latest assignment afloat was as Commander, United States Second Fleet and Commander, NATO Striking Fleet Atlantic and Commander, Naval Forces North Fleet East in Norfolk, Virginia; he was nominated to head the Fleet Forces Command on March 19, 2007.

On September 2, 2005, Roughead was a keynote speaker at the End of World War II Commemoration aboard the battleship USS Missouri (BB-63) Memorial on Ford Island in Hawaii.

=== Chief of Naval Operations ===
On September 29, 2007, Roughead was appointed Chief of Naval Operations. In January 2009, Roughead attended the inaugural parade of Barack Obama in Washington, D.C.

In 2011, Roughead retired from the U.S. Navy after 38 years of service and was succeeded in his post as Chief of Naval Operations by Admiral Jonathan Greenert.

=== Post-Navy career ===
After retirement, Roughead became a board member of Theranos, a now-defunct privately held health technology company known for its false claims to have devised revolutionary blood tests using very small amounts of blood. He sits on the executive committee of the Maritime Policy and Strategy Research Center (HMS).

Roughhead is a distinguished fellow at the Hoover Institution, a conservative think tank, and a member of the Board of Managers for the Johns Hopkins Applied Physics Laboratory.

== Awards and decorations ==
Surface Warfare Officer Insignia Office of the Joint Chiefs of Staff Identification Badge
Defense Distinguished Service Medal
Navy Distinguished Service Medal with one golden award star
Army Distinguished Service Medal
Defense Superior Service Medal
Legion of Merit with three award stars
Meritorious Service Medal with one award star
Navy Commendation Medal
Navy Achievement Medal with one award star
Joint Meritorious Unit Award
Navy Meritorious Unit Commendation with three bronze service stars
Navy "E" Ribbon with two Battle E devices
National Defense Service Medal with two bronze service stars
Armed Forces Expeditionary Medal with bronze service star
Vietnam Service Medal with one bronze service star
Navy Sea Service Deployment Ribbon with silver service star
Grand Cordon of the Order of the Rising Sun (Japan) 2009
Order of National Security Merit, Tong-il Medal (Republic of Korea)
Commander of the Order of Naval Merit (Brazil)
Grand Cross of the Order of Naval Merit Admiral Padilla (Colombia)
Meritorious Service Medal (Military) (Singapore)
Presidential Service Badge

Roughead is also a distinguished recipient of the "Bob Hope Five Star Award for Distinguished Service to America."
The Asian-American Government Executives Network (AAGEN) recognized Roughead with the AAGEN Excellence in Public Service Award June 10, 2010.

Military offices
Preceded by William Bogle	Commandant of Midshipmen; 1997–1999	Succeeded by Samuel Locklear
Preceded by Michael Mullen	Chief of Naval Operations; 2007–2011	Succeeded by Jonathan Greenert
