= James P. Wisecup =

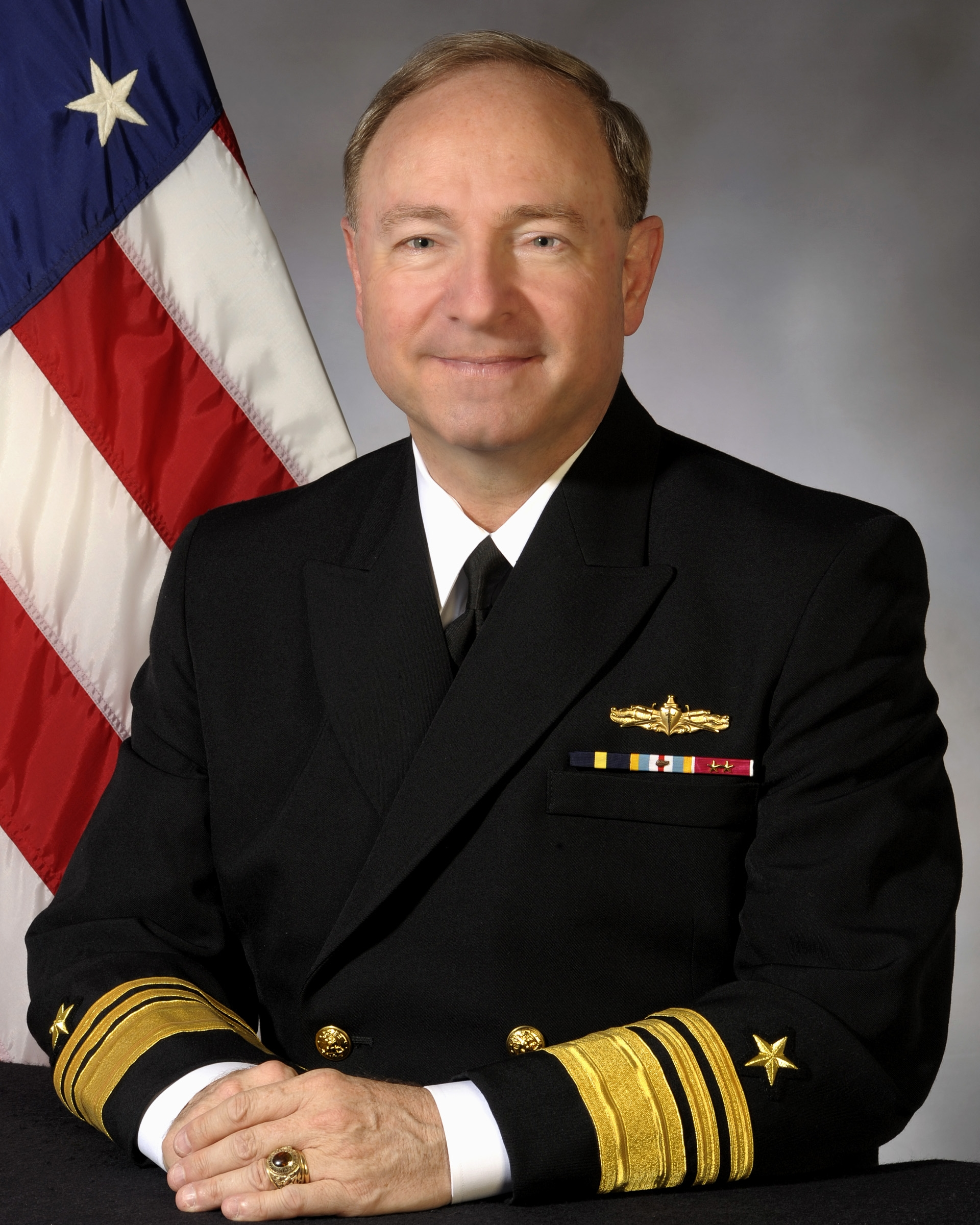
- Vice Admiral James P. Wisecup, USN
- Born: February 17, 1954 (age 72); Piqua, Ohio, U.S.
- Military career
- Allegiance: United States of America
- Branch: United States Navy
- Service years: 1977–2013
- Rank: Vice Admiral
- Nickname: "Phil"
- Commands: USS Callaghan (DDG-994); Destroyer Squadron 21; Naval Forces Korea; Carrier Strike Group Seven; President of the Naval War College; Naval Inspector General
- Conflicts: Operation Desert Storm; Operation Enduring Freedom
- Awards: Distinguished Service Medal; Defense Superior Service Medal; Legion of Merit; Meritorious Service Medal with three stars; Navy and Marine Corps Commendation Medal with two stars; Navy and Marine Corps Achievement Medal; Combat Action Ribbon; Navy Unit Commendation; Vice Admiral James Bond Stockdale Award for Inspirational Leadership

James P. "Phil" Wisecup (born 1954 in Piqua, Ohio) is a retired United States Navy vice admiral, who last served as the 38th Naval Inspector General. Prior to that, he served as the president of the Naval War College. Since October 2013, he has been director of the Chief of Naval Operations Strategic Studies Group.

== Family and education ==
The son of James and Bettye Ruth Bach Wisecup, Phil Wisecup is a 1973 graduate of Piqua High School and a 1977 graduate of the United States Naval Academy. He earned his master's degree in international relations from the University of Southern California; graduated from the Naval War College in Newport, Rhode Island, in 1998; and, as an Olmsted Scholar, earned a degree from the University of Strasbourg, France, in 1982. He married Ann, daughter of François-Georges Dreyfus, professor of history and political science at the University of Strasbourg and the University of Paris IV. Admiral Wisecup and his wife have five children.

== Naval career ==
At sea, Wisecup served as executive officer of the guided-missile cruiser USS Valley Forge (CG-50) during Operation Desert Storm. As commanding officer of the guided-missile destroyer USS Callaghan (DDG-994), he was awarded the Vice Admiral James Bond Stockdale Award for Inspirational Leadership in 1996. He served as Commander, Destroyer Squadron 21 during Operation Enduring Freedom after the terrorist attacks of 11 September 2001.

Ashore, Wisecup was assigned to North Atlantic Treaty Organization (NATO) Headquarters in Brussels, Belgium, served as force planner and ship scheduler for Commander, Naval Surface Forces Pacific, and served as action officer for Navy Headquarters Plans/Policy Staff. He served as a fellow on the Chief of Naval Operations Strategic Studies Group; was Director, White House Situation Room; and served as Commander Naval Forces Korea from 2005 to 2007. He then served as Commander, Carrier Strike Group Seven (the USS Ronald Reagan (CVN-76) Strike Group) from 2007 to 2008. Promoted to rear admiral (upper half), he served as the 52nd president of the U.S. Naval War College from November 2008 until April 2011. In April 2011, he was promoted to vice admiral and became the 38th Naval Inspector General.

Wisecup was President of the Naval War College from 6 November 2008 to 30 March 2011. He became Naval Inspector General on 18 April 2011 and served in that post through September 2013, when he retired from active duty.

== Later career ==
Upon retirement from active duty as a vice admiral in 2013, he returned to Newport, Rhode Island, where he became the 7th Director of the Chief of Naval Operations Strategic Studies Group.

== Awards and decorations ==
Wisecup's awards and decorations include:

- Navy Distinguished Service Medal
- Defense Superior Service Medal
- Legion of Merit
- Bronze Star Medal
- Defense Meritorious Service Medal
- Meritorious Service Medal with three stars.
- Navy and Marine Corps Commendation Medal with two stars.
- Navy and Marine Corps Achievement Medal
- Combat Action Ribbon
- Navy Unit Commendation

== See also ==
Military offices
Preceded by Jacob L. Shuford	President of the Naval War College; November 6, 2008–March 30, 2011	Succeeded by John N. Christenson
Preceded by Anthony L. Winns	Naval Inspector General; 11 April 2011–5 September 2013	Succeeded by James F. Caldwell, Jr.
