= Michael Mullen =

U.S. Navy admiral and 17th Chairman of the Joint Chiefs of Staff (born 1946)

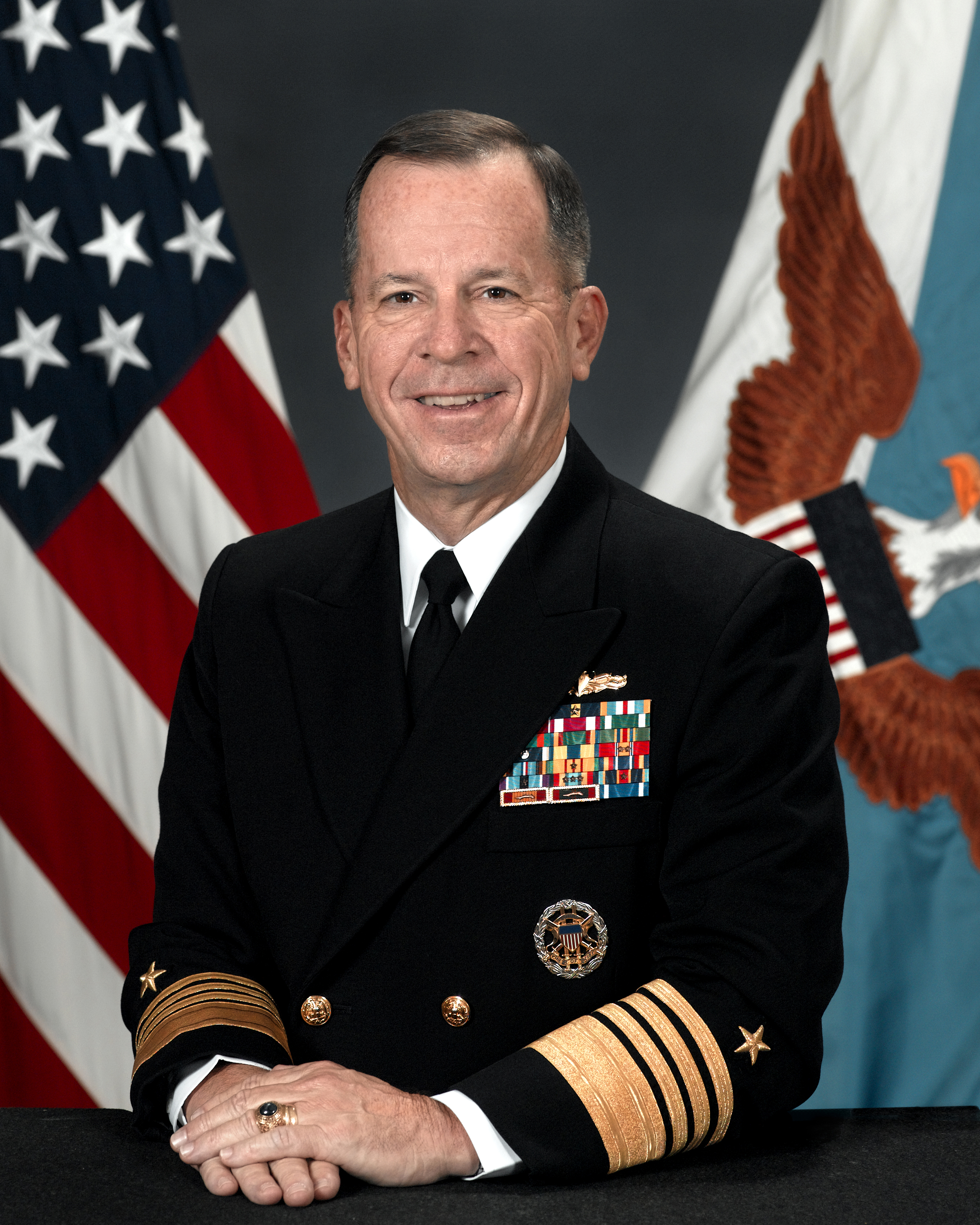
- Official portrait, 2007
- Born: Michael Glenn Mullen; 4 October 1946 (age 80); Los Angeles, California, U.S.
- Education: United States Naval Academy (BS); Naval Postgraduate School (MS)
- Military career
- Allegiance: United States
- Branch: United States Navy
- Service years: 1968–2011
- Rank: Admiral
- Commands: Chairman of the Joint Chiefs of Staff; Chief of Naval Operations; United States Naval Forces Europe and Africa; Allied Joint Force Command Naples; Vice Chief of Naval Operations; United States Second Fleet; NATO Striking Fleet Atlantic; Cruiser-Destroyer Group Two; George Washington Carrier Battle Group; USS Yorktown (CG-48); USS Goldsborough (DDG-20); USS Noxubee (AOG-56)
- Conflicts: Vietnam War; Gulf War
- Awards: Defense Distinguished Service Medal (4); Navy Distinguished Service Medal (2); Defense Superior Service Medal; Legion of Merit (6)
- Mullen's voice Mullen's opening statement at a Senate Armed Services Committee hearing on the New START treaty. Recorded 17 June 2010

Michael Glenn Mullen (born 4 October 1946) is a retired United States Navy admiral who served as the 17th chairman of the Joint Chiefs of Staff from October 2007 to September 2011.

Mullen was the 32nd vice chief of naval operations from August 2003 to August 2004. He then was the commander of both the United States Naval Forces Europe and Africa and the Allied Joint Force Command Naples from October 2004 to May 2005. From July 2005 to September 2007, Mullen served as the Navy's 28th chief of naval operations.

As chairman of the Joint Chiefs of Staff, Mullen was the highest-ranking officer in the United States Armed Forces and diversified the top ranks of the Pentagon. He retired from the Navy after over 43 years of service. After retirement, Mullen served as a visiting professor at the Princeton School of Public and International Affairs (2012–2018), as well as serving on the board of various corporations and non-profit organizations.

== Early life and education ==
Mullen was born on 4 October 1946, in Los Angeles, the eldest of five children of Mary Jane (Glenn), who worked as an assistant to comedian Jimmy Durante, and Hollywood press agent John Edward "Jack" Mullen. He attended St. Charles Borromeo Church School in North Hollywood, and graduated from Notre Dame High School, Sherman Oaks in 1964. Mullen then attended the United States Naval Academy in Annapolis and was classmates with former Commandant of the Marine Corps Michael Hagee, former Chief of Naval Operations Jay L. Johnson, former secretary of the Navy and senator from Virginia Jim Webb, National Security Council staff member during the Iran–Contra affair Oliver North, former director of National Intelligence Dennis C. Blair, and NASA administrator Charles Bolden. He graduated with a Bachelor of Science degree in 1968.

Along with his congeniality, [he] displayed fine leadership qualities. With his well rounded personality, his enthusiasm, and his desire to do his best, Navy-Air is indeed getting an outstanding officer. -- 1968 Lucky Bag, USNA college yearbook

== Naval career ==
=== Early career ===
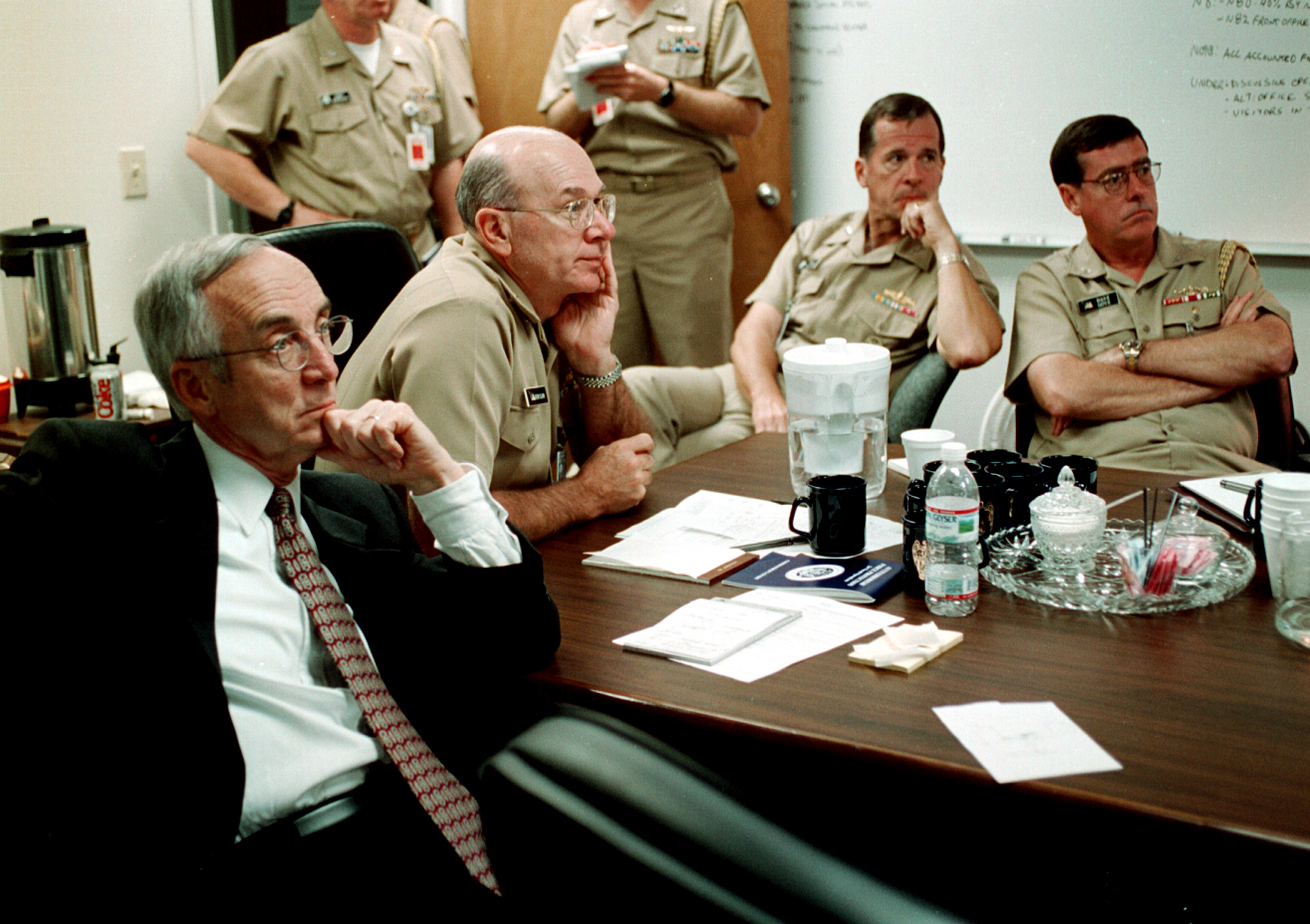
Mullen (seated third from left) at the Pentagon during the September 11 attacks in 2001

Early in his career, Mullen held positions aboard USS Collett (DD-730), USS Blandy (DD-943), USS Fox (CG-33) and USS Sterett (CG-31). He later served as commanding officer of USS Noxubee (AOG-56), USS Goldsborough (DDG-20) and USS Yorktown (CG-48). His flag assignments at sea included command of Cruiser-Destroyer Group Two and, subsequently, the U.S. Second Fleet and NATO Striking Fleet Atlantic.

In 1985, Mullen graduated from the Naval Postgraduate School in Monterey, California, with a Master of Science degree in Operations Research, and in 1991, he attended the six-week Harvard Business School Advanced Management Program.

Mullen served as Company Officer and Executive Assistant to the Commandant of Midshipmen at the U.S. Naval Academy. He also served in the Bureau of Naval Personnel as Director, Chief of Planning and Provisions, Surface Officer Distribution and in the Office of the Secretary of Defense on the staff of the Director, Operational Test and Evaluation. On the Chief of Naval Operations' staff, Mullen served as Deputy Director and Director of Surface Warfare and as Deputy Chief of Naval Operations for Resources, Requirements, and Assessments (N8). He was the 32nd Vice Chief of Naval Operations from August 2003 to October 2004.

Mullen was recognized by his peers in 1987 with the Vice Admiral James Bond Stockdale Award for Inspirational Leadership skill.

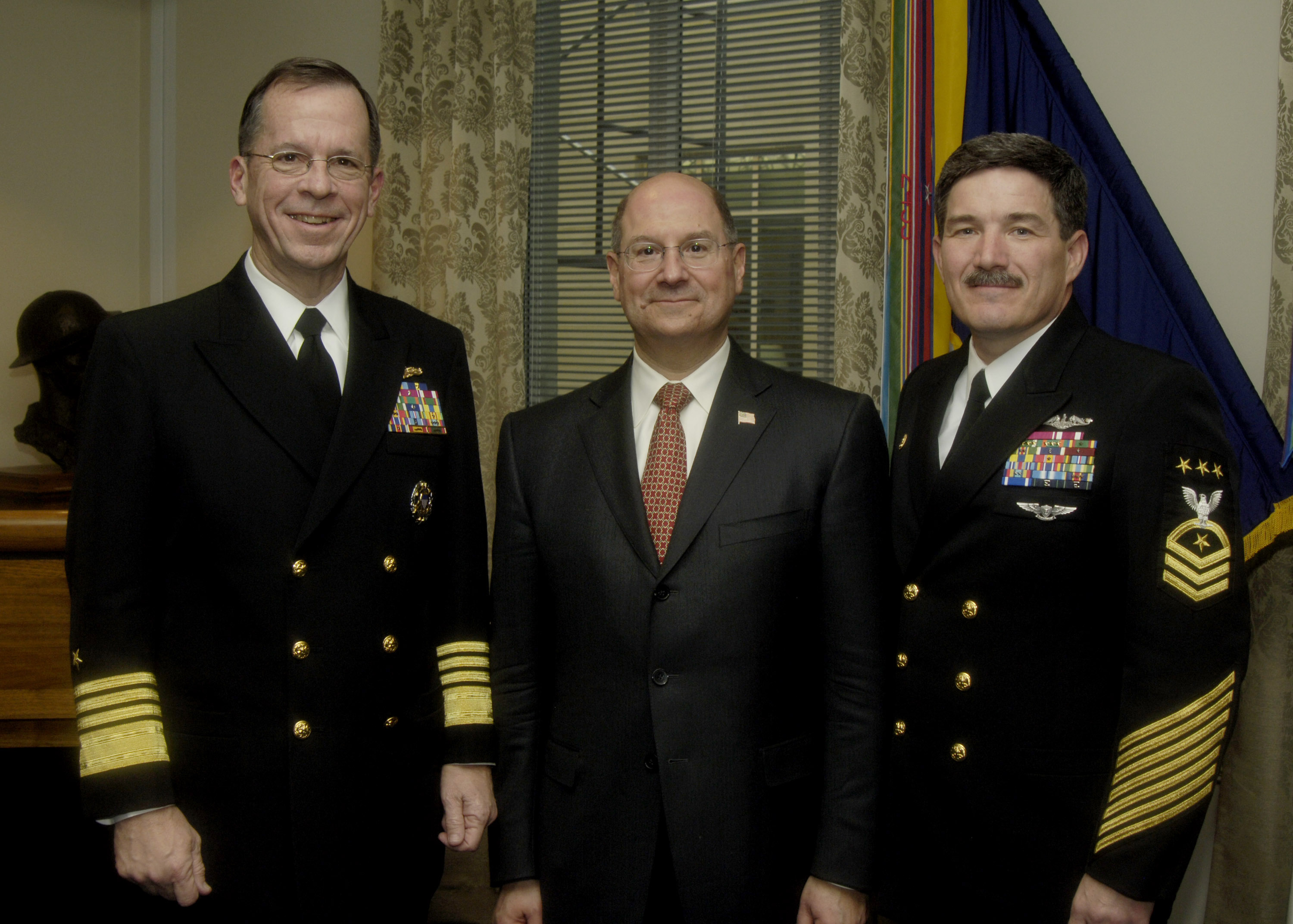
Then–Chief of Naval Operations, Admiral Mullen with Secretary of the Navy Donald Winter and MCPON Terry D. Scott, February 2006

Mullen awarding U.S. Army captain Gregory Ambrosia the Silver Star at Korengal Outpost, Afghanistan, 11 July 2008

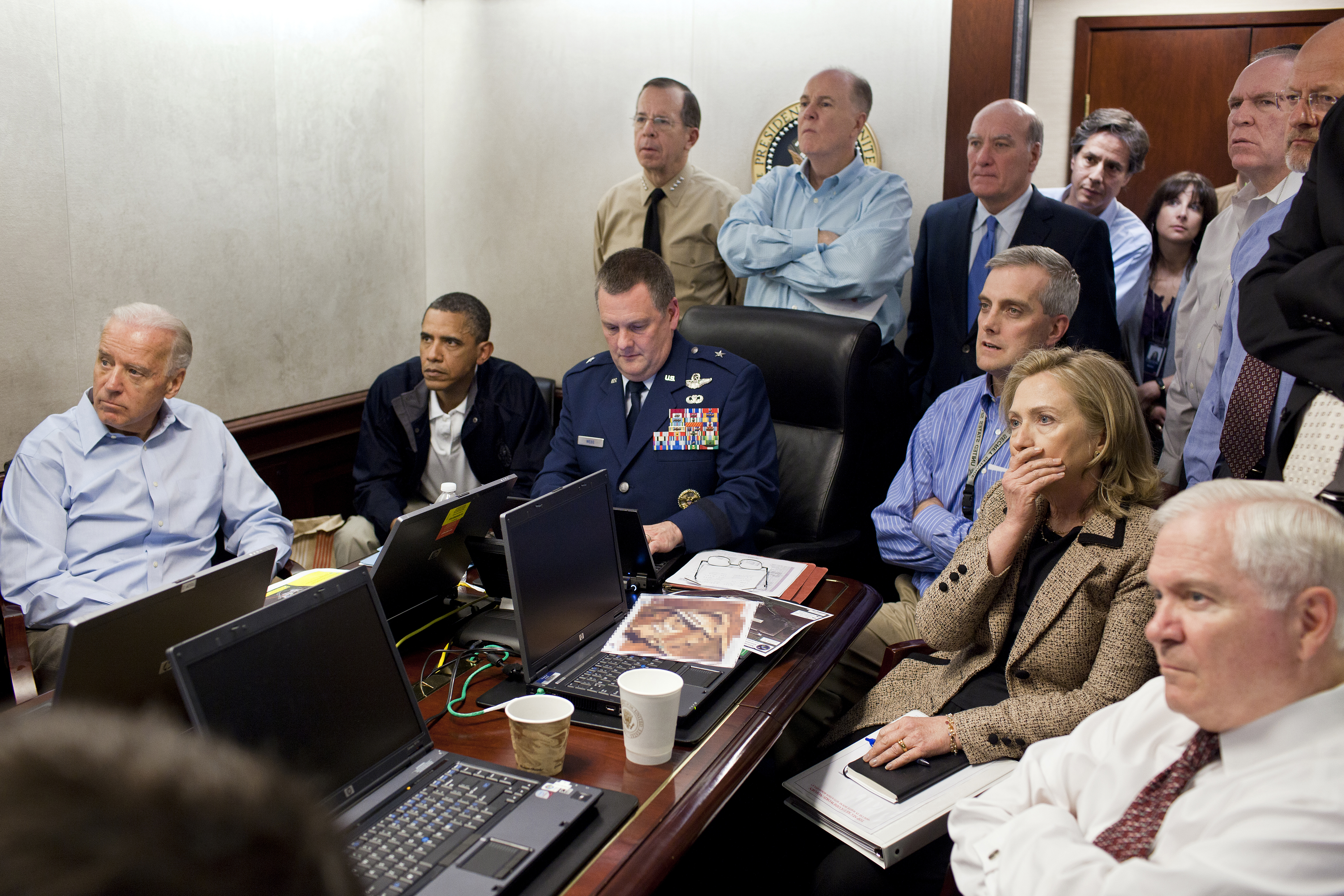
Mullen photographed with President Barack Obama and other members of the U.S. national security team watching the events of Operation Neptune's Spear unfold, on 1 May 2011

As Commander, Allied Joint Force Command Naples, Mullen had operational responsibility for NATO missions in the Balkans, Iraq, and the Mediterranean. As Commander, U.S. Naval Forces Europe, he was responsible for providing overall command, operational control, and coordination of U.S. naval forces in the European Command area of responsibility. He assumed these duties on 8 October 2004, and was relieved of them upon his becoming Chief of Naval Operations.

On 29 October 2006, the Honolulu Advertiser published an op-ed by Mullen that defined the concept of the 1,000-ship navy. However Admiral Gary Roughead, Mullen's successor as Chief of Naval Operations, rejected Mullen's concept in favor of a more inclusive vision that includes non-governmental organizations and cooperation with non-allied countries.

=== Chairman of the Joint Chiefs of Staff ===
On 8 June 2007, Secretary of Defense Robert M. Gates announced that he would advise President George W. Bush to nominate Mullen to succeed General Peter Pace as chairman of the Joint Chiefs of Staff; Bush announced the nomination formally on 28 June 2007.

On 3 August 2007, the United States Senate confirmed Mullen as the chairman of the Joint Chiefs of Staff. Mullen was sworn in on 1 October 2007. Upon taking office, Mullen became the first naval officer to hold the Chairman's position since Admiral William J. Crowe, who served as Chairman prior to the enactment of the Goldwater-Nichols Act in 1986, and who was the immediate predecessor to Army general and later United States Secretary of State Colin Powell.

During his tenure, he was responsible for the appointment of multiple African-American officers to the highest ranks of the military, including the appointment of General Lloyd Austin, later the first black secretary of defense, as Director of the Joint Staff.

On 18 March 2009, Gates recommended to President Barack Obama that Mullen be re-nominated for a second term as chairman of the Joint Chiefs. He was unanimously confirmed by the Senate on 25 September 2009 and began his second term on 1 October 2009.

On 2 February 2010, Mullen and Gates said that they fully supported President Obama's decision to end the "Don't ask, don't tell" policy, which prevented openly gay people from serving in the military. "It is my personal belief that allowing gays and lesbians to serve openly would be the right thing to do," Mullen said at a Senate Armed Services Committee hearing. "No matter how I look at the issue...I cannot escape being troubled by the fact that we have in place a policy which forces young men and women to lie about who they are in order to defend their fellow citizens. For me, it comes down to integrity—theirs as individuals and ours as an institution".

Mullen was present in the White House Situation Room with Obama during Operation Neptune Spear, which resulted in the killing of Osama bin Laden in May 2011.

=== 2007 Senate testimony regarding the Iraq War ===
During Mullen's Senate confirmation hearings for his first term nomination as Chairman of the Joint Chiefs of Staff, Mullen identified political progress in Iraq as a critical component of Iraq policy. He noted that, "there does not appear to be much political progress" in Iraq. He also said that, "Failure to achieve tangible progress toward [political] reconciliation requires a strategic reassessment", elaborating with, "If [the Iraqis] aren't making progress in [the political] realm, the prospects for movement in a positive direction are not very good." Mullen further told the Senate that the United States needs to "bring as much pressure on [Iraq's political leaders] as [the U.S.] possibly can".

Regarding the length and scope of the U.S. involvement in Iraq, Mullen told the Senate that while he does not envision permanent U.S. bases in Iraq, "vital interests in the region and in Iraq require a pragmatic, long-term commitment that will be measured in years, not months".

=== Debt ===
In 2010, Mullen said, "The most significant threat to our national security is our debt", arguing that the Pentagon needed better fiscal policies when it came to its spending. On 4 December 2012, he announced at the Newseum the formation of a group to put pressure to "avert the fiscal cliff".

=== Don't Ask, Don't Tell Repeal Act of 2010 ===
President Obama, United States Secretary of Defense Leon Panetta and Admiral Mullen provided the certification required by the Act to Congress on 22 July 2011. Implementation of repeal was completed 60 days later, so that DADT was no longer policy as of 20 September 2011.

=== Views on use of military force ===
In a speech at Kansas State University, Mullen outlined his views about the best application of military force in present times. He characterized most wars, such as World War II, as wars of attrition, where the reduction or elimination of enemy forces signaled victory. He characterized the Cold War as an issue of containment. In characterizing the current wars in Iraq and Afghanistan, he described them as "a fight against a syndicate of Islamic extremists led by al-Qaeda and supported by a host of both state and non-state actors", citing the border between Afghanistan and Pakistan as their "epicenter".

Mullen outlined three principles about the "proper use of modern military forces":

- Military power should not be the last resort of the state: Mullen pointed to the readiness and capacity of military forces to respond to crises as reason to deploy them sooner, rather than later, in response. "We can, merely by our presence, help alter certain behavior".
- Force should be applied in a precise and principled way: Mullen cites the sacrifice involved in deployment as requiring extreme care. Secondly, Mullen argues that "the battlefield isn't necessarily a field anymore. It's in the minds of the people". He cites General Stanley McChrystal's restriction of night raids as an example of this principle in action.
- Policy and strategy should constantly engage with one another: Given that current engagements are open-ended, Mullen posits that military strategy must be more constantly engaged with policy. "...war has never been a set-piece affair. The enemy adapts to your strategy and you adapt to his". He cites the review process which led to the current Afghanistan escalation as a model of engagement between military leaders and policy makers.

During the aftermath of the murder of George Floyd, President Trump threatened to order federal troops to quell violent riots during the middle of the COVID pandemic; in opposition, Mullen authored an article published in The Atlantic. Mullen stated, "I am deeply worried that as they execute their orders, the members of our military will be co-opted for political purposes".

== Retirement ==
President Obama nominated General Martin Dempsey as the next Chairman of the Joint Chiefs of Staff on Memorial Day 2011. Dempsey had only been sworn in as army chief of staff the previous month. On 30 September 2011, Mullen officially retired from the military when his term as chairman ended.

In December 2012, one year into his retirement, Mullen was in the news again, for having been the target of computer hacking, a situation that led to subsequent FBI investigations. In 2013, Mullen joined the board of General Motors.

On 11 July 2013, Mullen joined the board of directors of Sprint Nextel Corp directly after a buyout from SoftBank, one of Japan's largest cellular companies. In 2016, Mullen joined the Advisory Board of Afiniti, an American unicorn big data and artificial intelligence business. In September 2023, Mullen became chairman of the board of directors of unmanned maritime tech company Saildrone to "help steer the company to address the nation’s defense needs, against rapidly evolving adversaries."

Mullen was vetted by Michael Bloomberg to be his running mate in the 2016 presidential election, but Bloomberg decided against running.

In an interview with ABC News on 31 December 2017, Mullen stated his belief that the United States was close to a nuclear war with North Korea.

On 22 May 2024, Secretary of the Navy Carlos Del Toro announced that DDG 144, a Flight III Arleigh Burke-class destroyer, would be named USS Michael G. Mullen in his honor.

== Dates of rank ==
Ensign	Lieutenant (junior grade)	Lieutenant	Lieutenant commander	Commander	Captain
O-1	O-2	O-3	O-4	O-5	O-6
5 June 1968	5 June 1969	1 July 1971	1 October 1977	1 June 1983	1 September 1989

Rear admiral (lower half)	Rear admiral	Vice admiral	Admiral
O-7	O-8	O-9	O-10
1 April 1996	5 March 1998	21 September 2000	28 August 2003

== Military awards ==
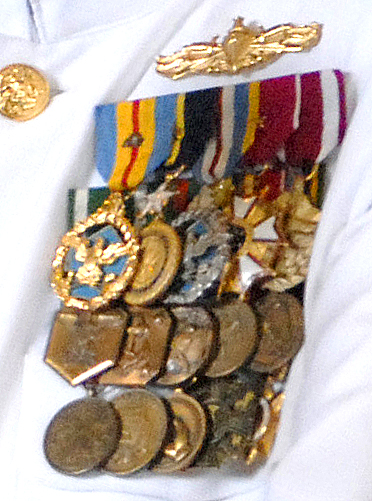
Admiral Mullen's medals as of 17 May 2007

=== United States military decorations ===
Ribbon	Description	Notes
	Defense Distinguished Service Medal	with three bronze oak leaf clusters
	Navy Distinguished Service Medal	with one gold award star
Ribbon of the DSSM	Defense Superior Service Medal	
	Legion of Merit	with one silver award star
Ribbon of the MSM	Meritorious Service Medal	
Ribbon of the NMCCM	Navy and Marine Corps Commendation Medal	
Ribbon of the NMCAM	Navy and Marine Corps Achievement Medal	
Ribbon of the NUC	Navy Unit Commendation Ribbon	
Ribbon of the NMUC	Navy Meritorious Unit Commendation Ribbon	
Ribbon of the USN – Battle E	Navy "E" Ribbon	with Wreathed Battle E device
Ribbon of the NEM	Navy Expeditionary Medal	
	National Defense Service Medal	with two bronze service stars
Ribbon of the AFEM	Armed Forces Expeditionary Medal	
	Vietnam Service Medal	with one bronze star
Ribbon of the GWTSM	Global War on Terrorism Service Medal	
	Humanitarian Service Medal	with one bronze star
	Navy Sea Service Deployment Ribbon	with three bronze stars
	Navy Overseas Service Ribbon	with one bronze star

=== Non-U.S. decorations ===
Ribbon	Issuing nation/organisation	Description	Date awarded	Notes
Ribbon of the VGC	Republic of Vietnam	Vietnam Gallantry Cross (device(s) unknown)		
Ribbon of the VCAM	Republic of Vietnam	Vietnam Civil Actions Medal 1st Class		
NOM	Republic of Chile	National Order of Merit (Commander)		
Ribbon of the Grand Officer of the Order of Merit	Republic of Italy	Order of Merit of the Italian Republic	14 April 2007	
Ribbon of the Legion of Honor, Knight degree	French Republic	National Order of the Legion of Honour	12 May 2007	
Medal of the Order of Australia	Commonwealth of Australia	Honorary Officer of the Order of Australia (Military Division)	5 November 2010	For distinguished service to the military relationship between Australia and the US as the Chairman of the Joint Chiefs of Staff, US
Ribbon of the Federal Cross of Merit	Federal Republic of Germany	Federal Cross of Merit	9 June 2011	For concern for German soldiers, his role in strengthening the close German-American friendship, and his services to the Federal Republic of Germany
Ribbon of the Meritorious Service Cross	Canada	Meritorious Service Cross	2013	
	Japan	Order of the Rising Sun, 1st class		
Ribbon of the VGC	Republic of Vietnam	Gallantry Cross Unit Citation Ribbon		
Ribbon of the VCAM	Republic of Vietnam	Civil Actions Unit Citation Ribbon		
	NATO	NATO Medal for Former Yugoslavia		
	Republic of Vietnam	Vietnam Campaign Medal		

=== Badges ===
Badge	Description
	Navy Surface Warfare Badge (Officer)
	Office of the Joint Chiefs of Staff Identification Badge

=== Other awards ===
In 1987, Mullen was awarded the Vice Admiral James Bond Stockdale Award for Inspirational Leadership. In 2009 the U.S. veterans group Soldier On awarded Admiral Mullen the first Soldier On Award, created for them by sculptor Andrew DeVries. The Soldier On Award recognizes individuals whose leadership and actions have advanced the goal of ending veteran homelessness.

In 2010, Mullen was appointed an Honorary Officer of the Order of Australia.

An auditorium was dedicated in his name 1 March 2012, before a graduation ceremony at the Surface Warfare Officers School in Newport, Rhode Island.

In 2024, the USS Michael G. Mullen was named after him due to him being a, "visionary leader in the mold of the greatest naval leaders that came before".

== Personal life ==
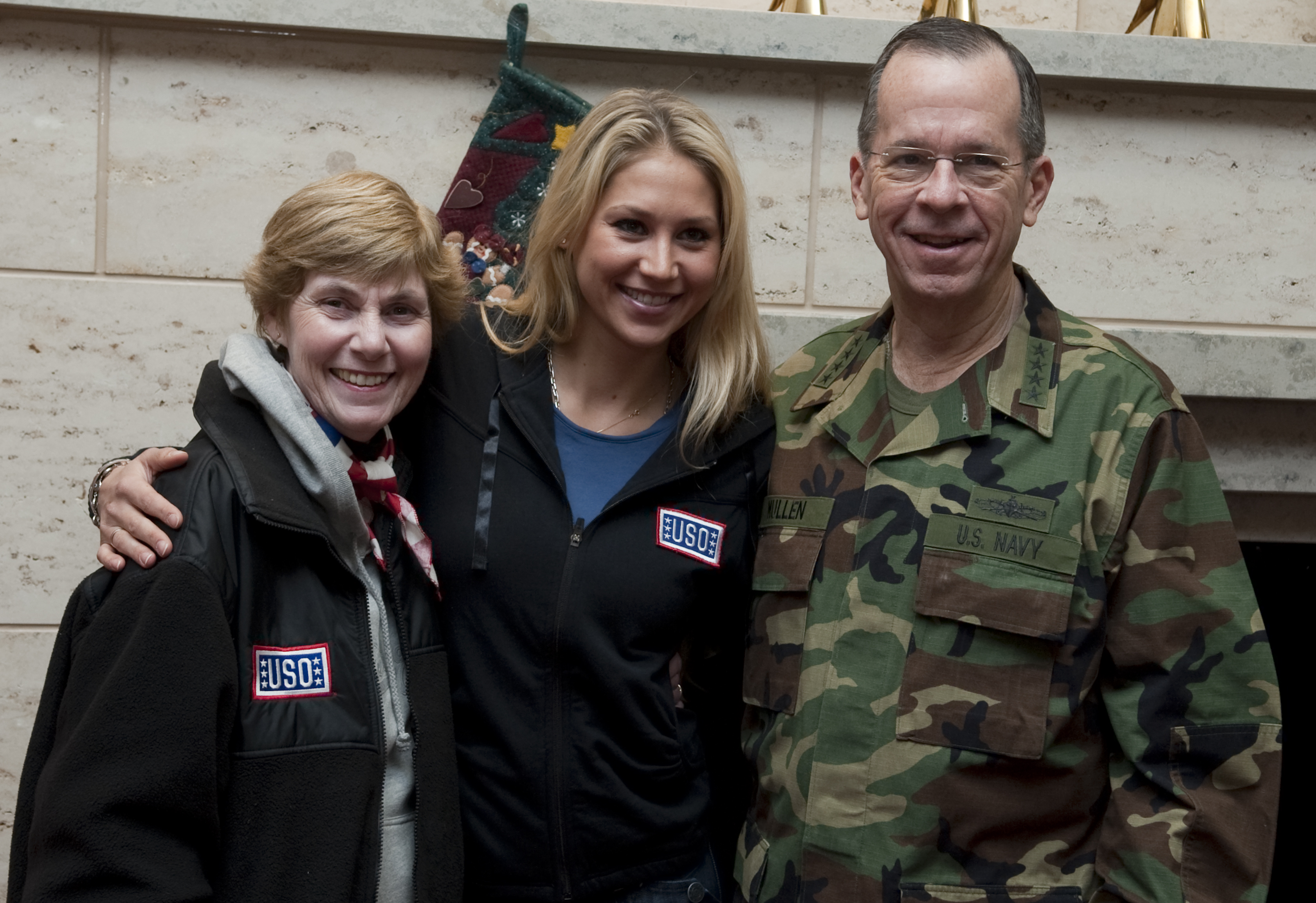
Deborah Mullen, Anna Kournikova, and Michael Mullen hosting the USO Holiday Troop Visit, 2009

Mullen is married to Deborah and together they have two sons, John "JMuls" Mullen and Michael Edward Mullen.

Military offices
Preceded by William J. Fallon	Vice Chief of Naval Operations; 2003–2004	Succeeded by John B. Nathman
Preceded by Gregory G. Johnson	Commander of United States Naval Forces Europe; 2004–2005	Succeeded by Harry Ulrich
Preceded by Gregory G. Johnson	Commander of Allied Joint Force Command Naples; 2004–2005	Succeeded by Harry Ulrich
Preceded by Vern Clark	Chief of Naval Operations; 2005–2007	Succeeded by Gary Roughead
Preceded by Peter Pace	Chairman of the Joint Chiefs of Staff; 2007–2011	Succeeded by Martin Dempsey
U.S. order of precedence (ceremonial)
Preceded by Peter Pace as former Chair of the Joint Chiefs of Staff	Order of precedence of the United States as former Chair of the Joint Chiefs of Staff	Succeeded by Martin Dempsey as former Chair of the Joint Chiefs of Staff
