= John M. Richardson (admiral) =

Retired U.S. Navy admiral, 31st Chief of Naval Operations

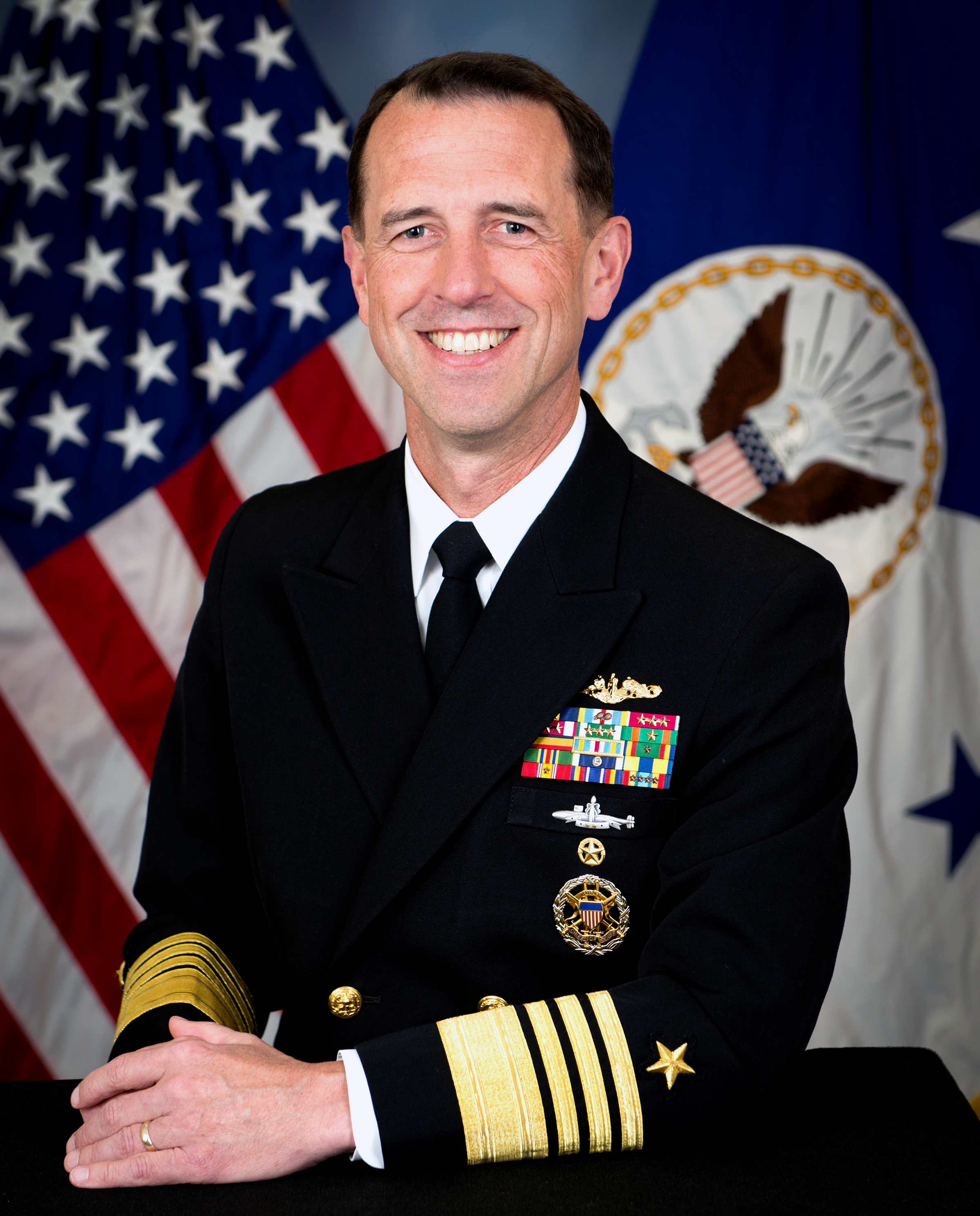
- Born: April 8, 1960 (age 66); Petersburg, Virginia, U.S.
- Alma mater: U.S. Naval Academy (BS) Massachusetts Institute of Technology (MS) National War College (MS)
- Military career
- Allegiance: United States
- Branch: United States Navy
- Service years: 1982–2020
- Rank: Admiral
- Units: USS Parche; USS George C. Marshall; USS Salt Lake City
- Commands: Chief of Naval Operations; Director of Naval Nuclear Propulsion; Naval Submarine Forces in Norfolk; Submarine Group 8 USS Honolulu
- Awards: Defense Distinguished Service Medal; Navy Distinguished Service Medal (3); Defense Superior Service Medal (3); Legion of Merit (4); Stockdale Award for Inspirational Leadership
- John M. Richardson's voice Richardson's opening statement at a Senate Armed Services Committee hearing on ship collisions Recorded September 19, 2017

John Michael Richardson (born April 8, 1960) is a retired four-star admiral in the United States Navy who previously served as the 31st Chief of Naval Operations. He served as the director of the Naval Nuclear Propulsion Program from November 2, 2012, to August 14, 2015. While serving as Director of Naval Nuclear Propulsion, itself a joint Department of Energy and Department of Navy organization, Richardson was responsible for the command and safe, reliable operation of the United States Navy's nuclear propulsion program and for all the current United States naval reactors deployed for usage as well as all facilities needed to ensure safe operations. He is currently a member of Boeing's Board of Directors.

On May 13, 2015, United States Secretary of Defense, Ashton Carter, announced Richardson's nomination to succeed Admiral Jonathan Greenert as Chief of Naval Operations. Richardson served as the 31st Chief of Naval Operations from September 18, 2015, to August 22, 2019. In October 2019, Boeing announced that Richardson had been elected to its board of directors as a member of the Aerospace Safety Committee and the Special Programs Committee. In November 2019, Richardson was named as a Senior Fellow at the Johns Hopkins Applied Physics Laboratory.

== Early life and education ==
Born on April 8, 1960, in Petersburg, Virginia, Richardson was commissioned into the United States Navy upon his graduation from the United States Naval Academy Annapolis, Maryland in 1982.

== Naval career ==
Richardson speaking on the John S. McCain collision, August 2017

During his naval career, Richardson has served primarily with submarine operations, serving on USS Parche, USS Salt Lake City, and USS George C. Marshall. Prior to being Director of Nuclear Propulsion, Richardson was Commander, Naval Submarine Forces (COMSUBFOR), where he was relieved by Michael J. Connor. Richardson has commanded USS Honolulu, Submarine Development Squadron 12, Submarine Group 8, and Submarine Allied Naval Forces South.

Richardson served as the Chief of Staff for U.S. Naval Forces Europe as well as U.S. Naval Forces Africa, Naval Aide to the President of the United States and Director of Strategy and Policy at U.S. Joint Forces Command. Richardson attended and received master's degrees from the Massachusetts Institute of Technology, the Woods Hole Oceanographic Institution, and the National War College. In 1997–1998, he attended MIT Seminar XXI.

=== Chief of Naval Operations ===
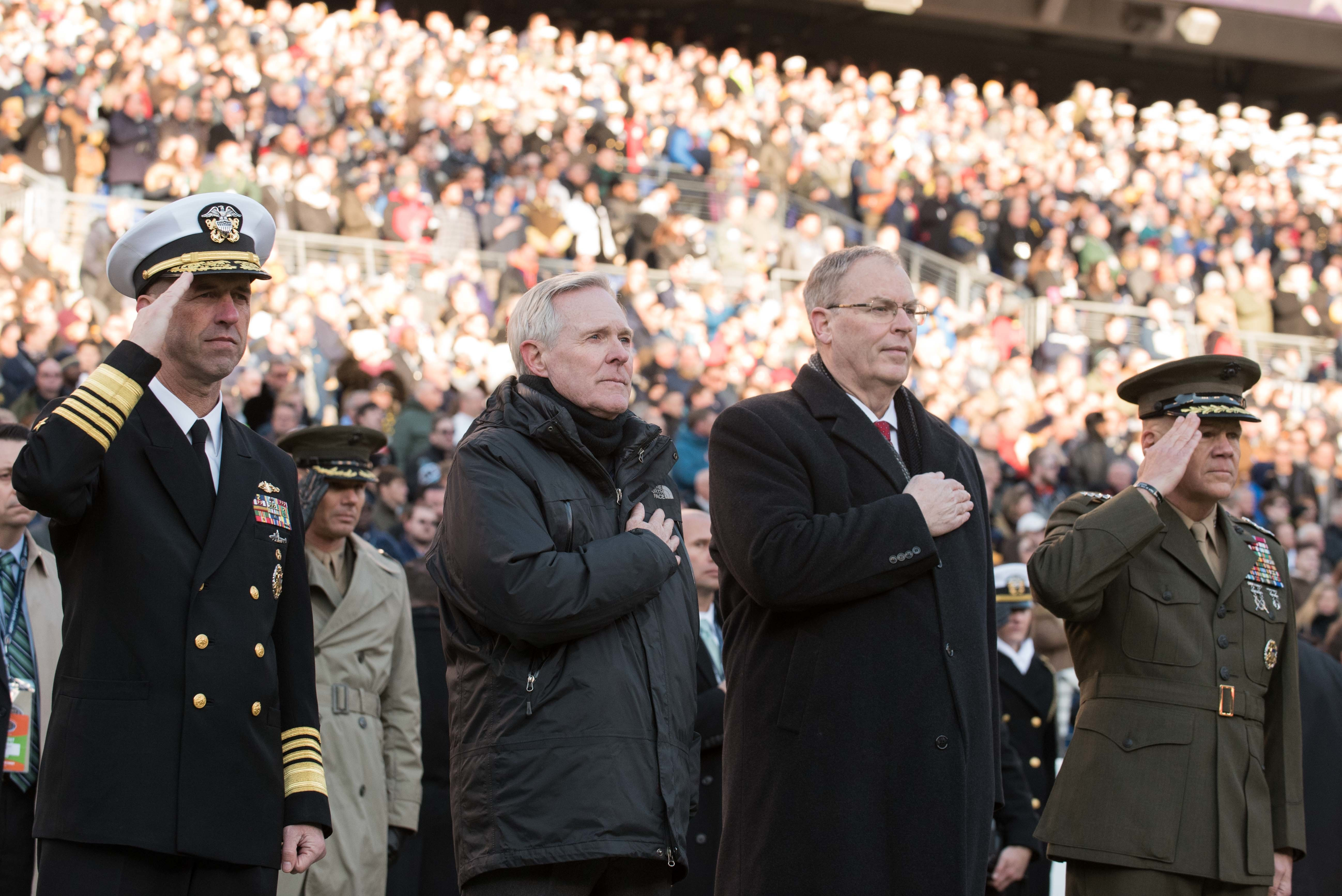
Adm. John M. Richardson, Sec. Ray Mabus, Deputy Sec. Work, and Gen. Robert Neller at the 117th Army–Navy Game, December 2016.

On May 13, 2015, Richardson was nominated by President Barack Obama to be the Chief of Naval Operations (CNO), was confirmed August 5, and began serving as CNO on September 18, 2015. In this capacity, Richardson made several trips to China, in an effort to reduce tension between the United States and Chinese military over naval operations conducted by both countries in the South China Sea. On 22 August 2019, Richardson was succeeded by Admiral Michael M. Gilday as the 32nd Chief of Naval Operations.

== Post-naval career ==
Since retiring from the Navy, Richardson serves on the Boards of Directors of Constellation Energy, The Boeing Company, BWX Technologies, the Center for New American Security, and the Navy League of the United States. Richardson is also a senior advisor to the Johns Hopkins University Applied Physics Laboratory and serves on the Director's Council of the Scripps Institution of Oceanography.

== Awards and decorations ==
In 2001, Richardson received the Vice Admiral James Bond Stockdale Award for Inspirational Leadership.

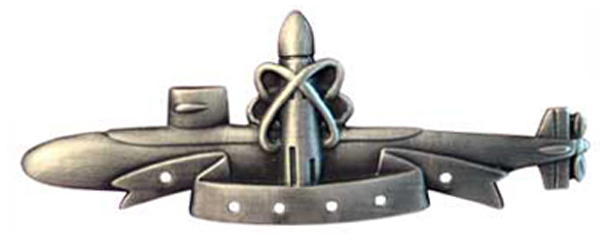

Badge	Submarine Warfare insignia (Officer)		
1st row	Defense Distinguished Service Medal	Navy Distinguished Service Medal (with two gold award stars)	Defense Superior Service Medal (with two bronze oak leaf clusters)
2nd row	Legion of Merit (with three gold award stars)	Meritorious Service Medal (with two gold award stars)	Navy Commendation Medal (with three gold award stars)
3rd row	Navy Achievement Medal (with one gold award star)	Navy Presidential Unit Citation	Joint Meritorious Unit Award
4th row	Navy Unit Commendation (with one bronze service star)	Navy Meritorious Unit Commendation	Navy "E" Ribbon (with a Wreathed Battle "E" device)
5th row	Navy Expeditionary Medal	National Defense Service Medal (with a bronze service star)	Global War on Terrorism Service Medal
6th row	Navy Sea Service Deployment Ribbon (with four service stars)	Brazilian Order of Naval Merit (commander)	Singapore Meritorious Service Medal (Military)
Badge	Silver SSBN Deterrent Patrol insignia with two gold stars		
Badge	Command at Sea insignia		
Badge	Office of the Joint Chiefs of Staff Identification Badge		
Badge	Presidential Service Badge		

Military offices
Preceded by Kirkland H. Donald	Director of the Naval Nuclear Propulsion Program; 2012–2015	Succeeded by James F. Caldwell Jr.
Preceded by Jonathan Greenert	Chief of Naval Operations; 2015–2019	Succeeded by Michael M. Gilday
