= USS Honolulu (SSN-718) =

Los Angeles-class nuclear-powered attack submarine of the US Navy

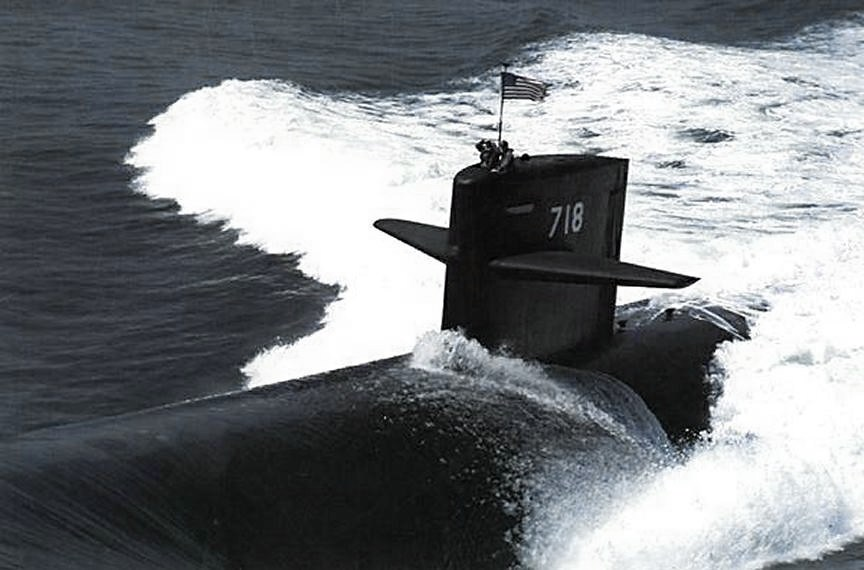
- USS Honolulu, probably during sea trials off the United States East Coast in 1984.

History

United States
- Name: USS Honolulu
- Namesake: Honolulu, Hawaii
- Awarded: 15 September 1977
- Builder: Newport News Shipbuilding, Newport News, Virginia
- Laid down: 10 November 1981
- Launched: 24 September 1983
- Sponsored by: Mrs. Joan B. Clark
- Commissioned: 6 July 1985
- Decommissioned: 2 November 2007
- Stricken: 2 November 2007
- Home port: Puget Sound Naval Shipyard
- Motto: Maka 'Ala Mau (Hawaiian for "Always on Alert")
- Fate: Disposed of by submarine recycling (except her bow)
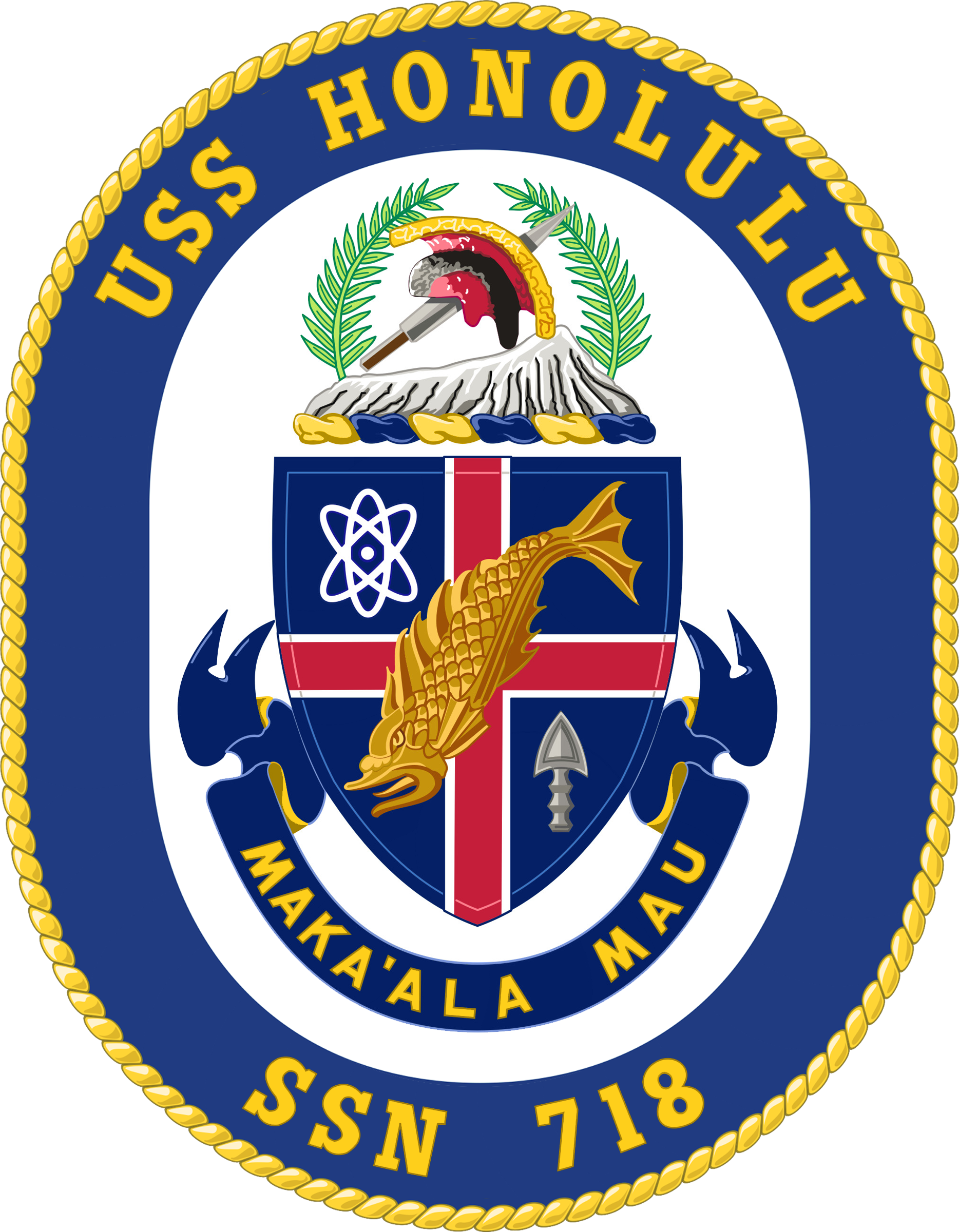
- Badge

General characteristics
- Class & type: Los Angeles-class submarine
- Displacement: 5,700 tons light, 6,068 tons full, 368 tons dead
- Length: 110.3 m (361 ft 11 in)
- Beam: 10 m (32 ft 10 in)
- Draft: 9.4 m (30 ft 10 in)
- Propulsion: S6G nuclear reactor
- Complement: 12 officers, 98 enlisted
- Armament: 4 × 21 in (533 mm) torpedo tubes

USS Honolulu (SSN-718) was a Los Angeles-class submarine and the third ship of the United States Navy to be named for Honolulu, Hawaii. The contract to build her was awarded to Newport News Shipbuilding and Dry Dock Company in Newport News, Virginia, on 15 September 1977, and her keel was laid down on 10 November 1981. She was launched on 24 September 1983, sponsored by Mrs. Joan B. Clark, and commissioned on 6 July 1985, with Commander Robert M. Mitchell in command.

Honolulu featured unique split stern planes that operated from independent hydraulic systems. With this redundant configuration, the inboard and outboard planes could be operated independently, preventing a failure of one or the other from causing an uncontrolled dive.

Honolulu's patrols were commemorated by 10 surfboards signed by the crews aboard her at the time. The latest three were kept on board the submarine; the other seven are stored at Pearl Harbor.

Honolulu held a farewell ceremony in Pearl Harbor on 15 April 2006 that included remarks by Senator Daniel K. Inouye, Lieutenant Governor Duke Aiona, U.S. Pacific Fleet Commander Admiral Gary Roughead, and former Honolulu commanding officer Vice Admiral Jonathan Greenert. Honolulu put to sea in early May 2006 for her final patrol, which ended at Puget Sound Naval Shipyard in October 2006, where she was placed on stand down, on her way to decommissioning.

== Disposition ==
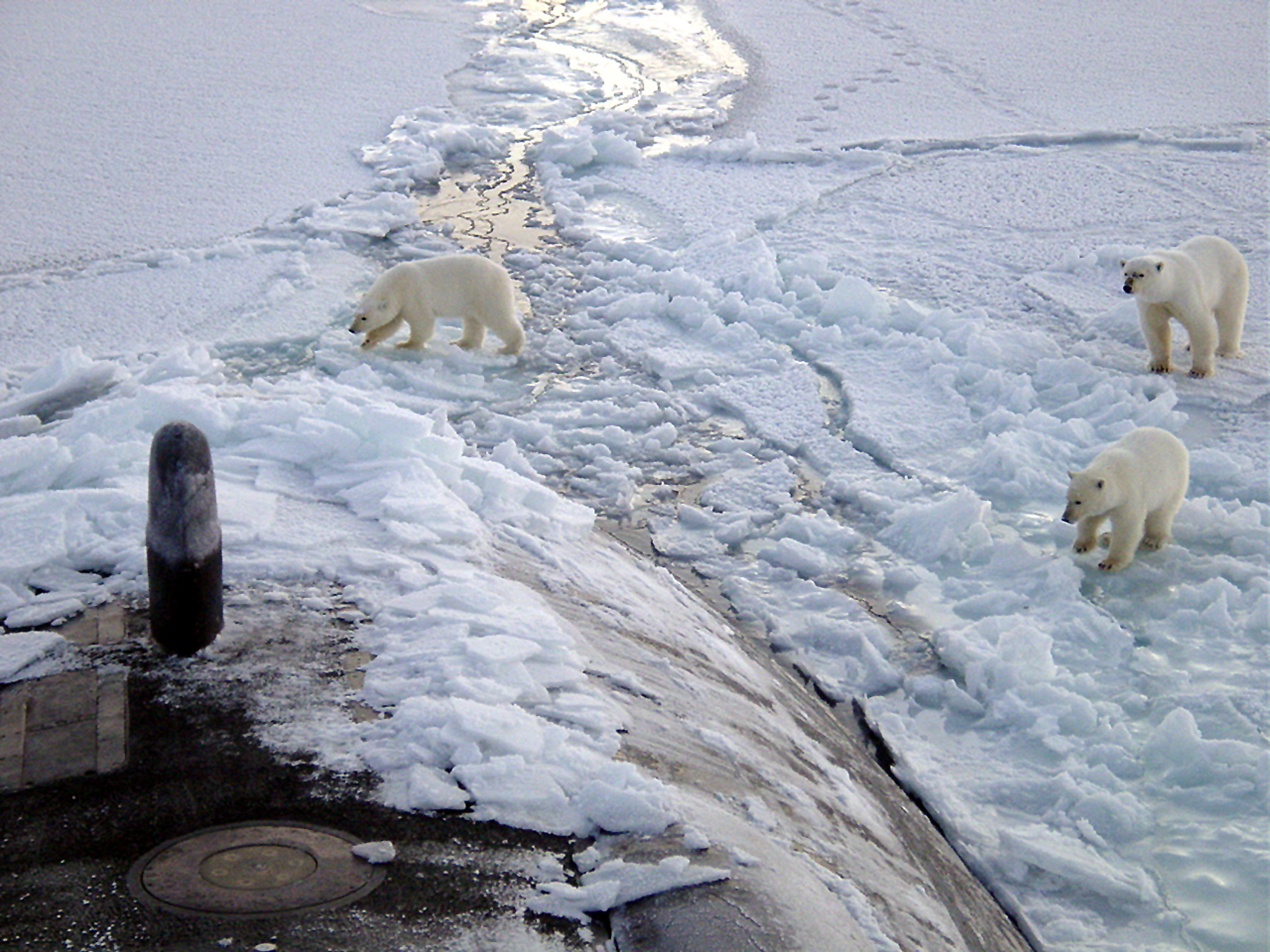
Three polar bears approach Honolulu's starboard bow while she is on the surface 280 nautical miles (519 km) from the North Pole.

Honolulu was decommissioned and stricken from the Naval Vessel Register on 2 November 2007. Ex-Honolulu entered the Nuclear Powered Ship and Submarine Recycling Program in Bremerton, Washington.

The forward section of ex-Honolulu was transferred to USS San Francisco, repairing extensive damage caused by a severe grounding San Francisco experienced in 2005. Despite difficulties, the unusual project was completed on 20 October 2008.

== In fiction and literature ==
Although she had already been decommissioned, the submarine is featured prominently in the 2008 naval thriller, Black Sea Affair, by Don Brown.
