= Order of Naval Merit (Brazil) =

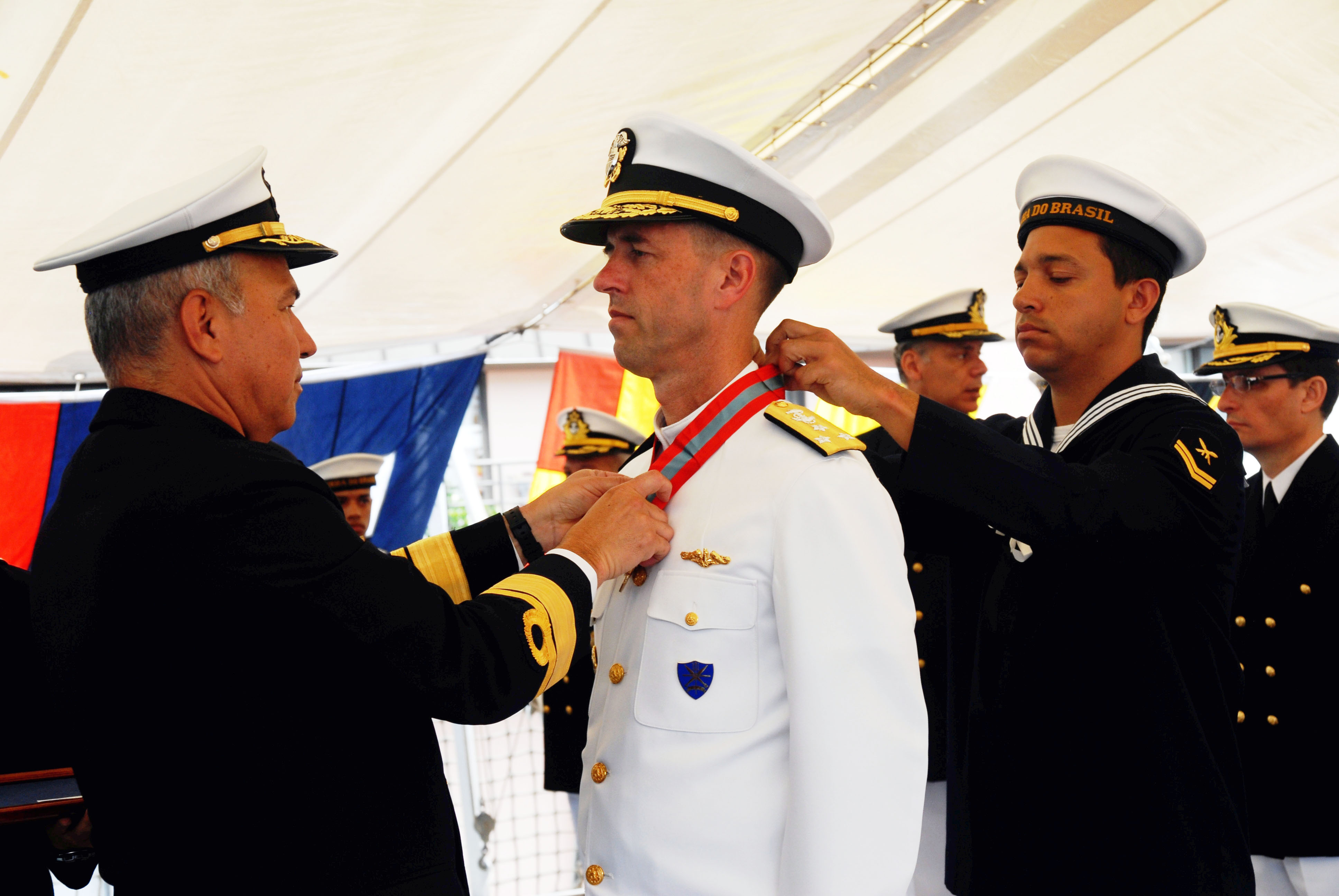
- Vice Adm. John M. Richardson receives the Brazilian Order of Naval Merit
- Type: State Order
- Awarded for: To those who have served with distinction in the Brazilian Navy or have contributed in some way to the Navy
- Country: Brazil
- Presented by: Brazilian Navy
- Eligibility: Naval military personnel only
- Status: Active
- Established: 4 July 1934

The Order of Naval Merit (Portuguese: Ordem do Mérito Naval) is a Brazilian military decoration established on 4 July 1934 by president Getúlio Vargas.

== Design ==
On the obverse side of the medal is the effigy of the republic, surrounded by a circle of blue enamel, on which is written the words "Naval Merit". On the reverse side, the word "Brasil" is inscribed in the same blue circle. The medal is composed with a red grosgrain ribbon, or chamalotada, with a light blue stripe in the center.

== Grades ==
The five grades are Grand Cross, Grand Officer, Commander, Officer, and Chevalier.

Ribbons
| Grand Cross; Grã-Cruz | Grand Officer; Grande-Oficial | Commander; Comendador | Officer; Oficial | Knight; Cavaleiro |
