= 2026 Washington Supreme Court election =

The 2026 Washington Supreme Court election was held on November 3, 2026, to elect five members of the Washington Supreme Court. There were three regular elections for the seats held by Justices Raquel Montoya-Lewis, Charles W. Johnson, and Debra Stephens. Justice Montoya-Lewis is not seeking re-election and Justice Johnson reached the mandatory retirement age making him ineligible to seek re-election. In addition, there were two special elections for appointed Justices Colleen Melody and Theo Angelis to finish the terms of Justices Mary Yu and Barbara Madsen respectively.

The election was held concurrently with the 2026 US midterm election, as well as elections to the US House of Representatives, Washington State Senate and House, and various county and local offices. Primary elections were held on August 4, 2026 using a top-two primary where all candidates were listed on the same ballot and the two candidates with the most votes advanced to the general election.

There were two open seats on the court and an additional two justices up for election for the first time. Four new justices joining the court of nine in a two-year span is a high rate of turnover for the Washington Supreme Court.

== Position 1 (special) ==
2026 Washington Supreme Court Position 1 special election
Candidate	Colleen Melody	Scott Edwards
Party	Nonpartisan	Nonpartisan
- Melody: 50–60% 60–70% 70–80% Edwards: 40–50% 50–60% 60–70% 70–80%
Washington Supreme Court Justice before election
Colleen Melody
Nonpartisan
Elected Washington Supreme Court Justice
TBD

In September of 2025, Justice Mary Yu, the first LGBTQ+ justice in Washington, announced she would retire in December triggering the special election to be held in November 2026. In November of 2025, Governor Bob Ferguson announced he would appoint Colleen Melody to serve in Justice Yu's position. The election will be for a two-year term with the next regular election for this position scheduled for 2028. Justice Melody has filed to run to retain the seat.

=== Primary election ===
==== Candidates ====
===== Advanced to general =====
- Scott Edwards, tax lawyer
- Colleen Melody, incumbent justice

===== Eliminated in primary =====
- Laura Christensen Colberg, family law attorney and pro tem commissioner for the Snohomish County superior court

===== Withdrawn =====
- Anne Bremner, TV legal analyst

==== Endorsements ====
Laura Christensen Colberg

Political parties

- Washington State Republican Party (co-endorsement with Edwards) (Note: Recommended candidate)
Scott Edwards

Political parties

- Washington State Republican Party (co-endorsement with Colberg)
Colleen Melody

State officials

- Bob Ferguson, incumbent Governor of Washington (Democratic)
- Nick Brown, incumbent Washington Attorney General (Democratic)
- Jay Inslee, former Governor of Washington (2013–2025) (Democratic)

Judicial officials

- Debra L. Stephens, incumbent chief justice of the Washington Supreme Court
- Charles W. Johnson, incumbent Washington Supreme Court justice
- Steven González, incumbent Washington Supreme Court justice
- Sheryl Gordon McCloud, incumbent Washington Supreme Court justice
- Raquel Montoya-Lewis, incumbent Washington Supreme Court justice
- Helen Whitener, incumbent Washington Supreme Court justice
- Sal Mungia, incumbent Washington Supreme Court justice
- Theo Angelis, incumbent Washington Supreme Court justice

Newspapers

- The Seattle Times
- The Stranger

Organizations

- Planned Parenthood
- Third Act

==== Results ====
Results by county: Melody: 30–40%; 40–50%; 50–60%; 60–70%; Edwards: 30–40%; 40–50%; 50–60%; Colberg: 30–40%; 40–50%

Blanket primary results
Party	Candidate	Votes	%
Nonpartisan	Colleen Melody (incumbent)	923,965	52.90
Nonpartisan	Scott Edwards	513,394	29.39
Nonpartisan	Laura Christensen Colberg	305,110	17.47
Write-in		4,081	0.23
Total votes		1,746,550	100.00

== Position 3 ==
2026 Washington Supreme Court Position 3 election
Candidate	Jaime Hawk	David Stevens
Party	Nonpartisan	Nonpartisan
- Hawk: 50–60% 60–70% 70–80% Stevens: 50–60% 60–70% 70–80%
Washington Supreme Court Justice before election
Raquel Montoya-Lewis
Nonpartisan
Elected Washington Supreme Court Justice
TBD

In January 2026, Justice Raquel Montoya-Lewis, the first Native American elected to a statewide office in Washington, announced she would not seek re-election to a second term. She will serve out the remainder of her term making this an open seat for the November election.

=== Primary election ===
==== Candidates ====
===== Advanced to general =====
- Jaime Hawk, King County superior court judge
- David Stevens, Mason County superior court judge

===== Eliminated in primary =====
- J. Michael Diaz, Washington Court of Appeals Division I judge

==== Endorsements ====
J. Michael Diaz

State officials

- Nick Brown, incumbent Washington Attorney General (Democratic)
- Jay Inslee, former Governor of Washington (2013–2025) (Democratic)
- Christine Gregoire, former Governor of Washington (2005–2013) (Democratic)
- Gary Locke, former Governor of Washington (1997–2005) (Democratic)

Judicial officials

- Steven González, incumbent Washington Supreme Court justice
- Sheryl Gordon McCloud, incumbent Washington Supreme Court justice
- Colleen Melody, incumbent Washington Supreme Court justice
- Raquel Montoya-Lewis, incumbent Washington Supreme Court justice
- Sal Mungia, incumbent Washington Supreme Court justice

Newspapers

- The Seattle Times
- The Stranger

Organizations

- Planned Parenthood
- Third Act (co-endorsement with Hawk)
Jaime Hawk

State officials

- Bob Ferguson, incumbent Governor of Washington (Democratic)

Judicial officials

- Helen Whitener, incumbent Washington Supreme Court justice
- Mary Yu, former Washington Supreme Court justice (2014–2025)
- Cecily Hazelrigg, incumbent Washington Court of Appeals Division I judge

Organizations

- Third Act (co-endorsement with Diaz)
David Stevens

Political parties

- Washington State Republican Party

==== Results ====
Results by county: Stevens: 30–40%; 40–50%; 50–60%; 60–70%; Hawk: 30–40%; 40–50%; Diaz: 40–50%

Blanket primary results
Party	Candidate	Votes	%
Nonpartisan	David Stevens	612,267	35.19
Nonpartisan	Jaime Hawk	578,979	33.27
Nonpartisan	J. Michael Diaz	543,721	31.25
Write-in		5,061	0.29
Total votes		1,740,028	100.00

== Position 4 ==
2026 Washington Supreme Court Position 4 election

Candidate	Ian Birk	Sean O'Donnell
Party	Nonpartisan	Nonpartisan
- O'Donnell: 50–60% 60–70% 70–80% Birk: 50–60% 60–70%
Washington Supreme Court Justice before election
Charles W. Johnson
Nonpartisan
Elected Washington Supreme Court Justice
TBD

Justice Charles W. Johnson reached the mandatory retirement age of 75 and is therefore ineligible to seek re-election.

=== Candidates ===
==== Advanced to general ====
- Ian Birk, Washington Court of Appeals Division I judge
- Sean O'Donnell, King County superior court judge

=== Endorsements ===
Ian Birk

State officials

- Patty Kuderer, incumbent Insurance Commissioner of Washington (Democratic)
- Jay Inslee, former Governor of Washington (2013–2025) (Democratic)

Judicial officials

- Mary Yu, former Washington Supreme Court justice (2014–2025)
- 4 current Washington Supreme Court justices
- 1 former Washington Supreme Court justice

State legislators

- Jamie Pedersen, incumbent State Senate Majority Leader, state senator from the 43rd district (Democratic)
- Emily Alvarado, incumbent state senator from the 34th district
- Noel Frame, incumbent state senator from the 36th district
- Rebecca Saldaña, incumbent state senator from the 37th district
- Joe Fitzgibbon, incumbent state representative from the 34th district
- Liz Berry, incumbent state representative from the 36th district
- Shaun Scott, incumbent state representative from the 43rd district
- Darya Farivar, incumbent state representative from the 46th district

Local officials

- Girmay Zahilay, incumbent King County Executive
- Teresa Mosqueda, incumbent King County Council member from the 8th district
- Joy Hollingsworth, incumbent Seattle City Council member from the 3rd district

Newspapers

- The Stranger

Organizations

- Planned Parenthood
- Third Act
Sean O'Donnell

State officials

- Christine Gregoire, former Governor of Washington (2005–2013) (Democratic)
- Gary Locke, former Governor of Washington (1997–2005) (Democratic)
- Dave Upthegrove, Washington Public Lands Commissioner (2025–present) (Democratic)
- Rob McKenna, former Washington Attorney General (2005–2013) (Republican)

Judicial officials

- Helen Whitener, incumbent Washington Supreme Court justice
- Bobbe Bridge, former Washington Supreme Court justice

U.S. representatives

- Adam Smith, WA-09 (1997–present) (Democratic)
- Marilyn Strickland, WA-10 (2021–present) (Democratic)

Local officials

- Joy Hollingsworth, incumbent Seattle City Council member from the 3rd district
- Bob Kettle, incumbent Seattle City Council member from district 7
- Tim Burgess, former interim Mayor of Seattle (2017–2017) and Seattle City Council member (2008–2017)
- Bruce Harrell, former Mayor of Seattle (2022–2026)
- Sally Bagshaw, former Seattle City Council member from district 7 (2010–2019)
- Martha Choe, former Seattle City Council member (1992–1999)
- Sara Nelson, former Seattle City Council member (2022–2026)
- Mike O'Brien, former Seattle City Council member from district 6 (2010–2020)

Unions

- LiUNA Local 292

Party chapters

- Benton County Democratic Party
- Okanogan County Democratic Pary
- Whatcom County Democratic Party
- 30th Legislative District Democratic Party

Newspapers

- The Seattle Times
Declined to endorse

Political parties

- Washington State Republican Party

== Position 5 (special) ==
2026 Washington Supreme Court Position 5 special election

Candidate	Theo Angelis	Dave Larson
Party	Nonpartisan	Nonpartisan
- Angelis: 50–60% 60–70% 70–80% Larson: 50–60% 60–70% 70–80%
Washington Supreme Court Justice before election
Theo Angelis
Nonpartisan
Elected Washington Supreme Court Justice
TBD

In February of 2026, Justice Barbra Madsen, the first woman to become a justice in Washington via election, announced she would retire effective April 3rd triggering the special election to be held in November 2026. In March, Governor Bob Ferguson announced he would appoint Theo Angelis to serve in Justice Madsen's position making him the first Washington justice of Middle Eastern descent. The election will be for a two-year term with the next regular election for this position scheduled for 2028. Justice Angelis has declared he will run to retain the seat.

=== Primary election ===
==== Candidates ====
===== Advanced to general =====
- Theo Angelis, incumbent justice
- Dave Larson, former Federal Way municipal court judge, candidate for justice in 2024, 2020, 2016, and 2000

===== Eliminated in primary =====
- Sharonda Amamilo, Thurston County superior court judge
- Greg Miller, health law appellate lawyer

==== Endorsements ====
Sharonda Amamilo

Judicial officials

- Helen Whitener, incumbent Washington Supreme Court justice

Newspapers

- The Seattle Times
Theo Angelis

State officials

- Bob Ferguson, incumbent Governor of Washington (Democratic)
- Denny Heck, incumbent Lieutenant Governor of Washington (Democratic)
- Christine Gregoire, former Governor of Washington (2005–2013) (Democratic)

Judicial officials

- Charles W. Johnson, incumbent Washington Supreme Court justice
- Sal Mungia, incumbent Washington Supreme Court justice
- Helen Whitener, incumbent Washington Supreme Court justice
- 2 other Washington Supreme Court justices

State legislators

- Jamie Pedersen, incumbent State Senate Majority Leader, state senator from the 43rd district
- 16 other state senators (Note: Marcus Riccelli, incumbent state senator from the 3rd district; Bob Hasegawa, incumbent state senator from the 11th district; Adrian Cortes, incumbent state senator from the 18th district; Marko Liias, incumbent state senator from the 21st district; Jessica Bateman, incumbent state senator from the 22nd district; Drew Hansen, incumbent state senator from the 23rd district; Mike Chapman, incumbent state senator from the 24th district; Deb Krishnadasan, incumbent state senator from the 26th district; Claire Wilson, incumbent state senator from the 30th district; Tina Orwall, incumbent state senator from the 33rd district; June Robinson, incumbent state senator from the 38th district; Lisa Wellman, incumbent state senator from the 41st district; Sharon Shewmake, incumbent state senator from the 42nd district; John Lovick, incumbent state senator from the 44th district; Claudia Kauffman, incumbent state senator from the 47th district; Annette Cleveland, incumbent state senator from the 49th district)
- Laurie Jinkins, incumbent Speaker of the House, state representative from the 27th district
- 19 other state representatives (Note: Timm Ormsby, incumbent state representative from the 3rd district; Lisa Callan, incumbent state representative from the 5th district; Steve Bergquist, incumbent state representative from the 11th district; David Hackney, incumbent state representative from the 11th district; Lillian Ortiz-Self, incumbent state representative from the 21st district; Strom Peterson, incumbent state representative from the 21st district; Beth Doglio, incumbent state representative from the 22nd district; Lisa Parshley, incumbent state representative from the 22nd district; Greg Nance, incumbent state representative from the 23rd district; Mari Leavitt, incumbent state representative from the 28th district; Cindy Ryu, incumbent state representative from the 32nd district; Chipalo Street, incumbent state representative from the 37th district; Mary Fosse, incumbent state representative from the 38th district; Debra Lekanoff, incumbent state representative from the 40th district; Alex Ramel, incumbent state representative from the 40th district; Joe Timmons, incumbent state representative from the 42nd district; Gerry Pollet, incumbent state representative from the 46th district; Osman Salahuddin, incumbent state representative from the 48th district; Sharon Wylie, incumbent state representative from the 49th district)

Local officials

- Girmay Zahilay, incumbent King County Executive
- Rod Dembowski, incumbent King County Council member from the 1st district
- Anders Ibsen, incumbent Mayor of Tacoma
- Dontae Payne, incumbent Mayor of Olympia

Newspapers

- The Stranger

Organizations

- Planned Parenthood
- Third Act
Dave Larson

State officials

- Sam Reed, former Washington Secretary of State (2001–2013) (Republican)
- Christine Todd Whitman, former Governor of New Jersey (1994–2001) (Forward)

Individuals

- Andrew Yang, entrepreneur, founder of Venture for America, Democratic candidate for president in 2020 and mayor of New York City in 2021 (Forward)

Organizations

- Tax AI, Not Humans

Political parties

- Forward Party
- Washington State Republican Party

==== Results ====
Results by county: Angelis: 30–40%; 40–50%; 50–60%; Larson: 30–40%; 40–50%; 50–60%

Blanket primary results
Party	Candidate	Votes	%
Nonpartisan	Theo Angelis (incumbent)	623,396	35.84
Nonpartisan	Dave Larson	559,629	32.17
Nonpartisan	Sharonda Amamilo	371,059	21.33
Nonpartisan	Greg Miller	181,542	10.44
Write-in		3,799	0.22
Total votes		1,739,425	100.00

== Position 7 ==
2026 Washington Supreme Court Position 7 election
Candidate	Debra Stephens	Todd Bloom
Party	Nonpartisan	Nonpartisan
- Stephens: 50–60% 60–70% 70–80% Bloom: 40–50% 50–60% 60–70%
Washington Supreme Court Justice before election
Debra Stephens
Nonpartisan
Elected Washington Supreme Court Justice
TBD

Chief Justice Debra Stephens is running for re-election.

=== Primary election ===
==== Candidates ====
===== Advanced to general =====
- Todd Bloom, tax attorney, candidate for justice in 2024, and Republican candidate for Washington's 6th congressional district in 2022 and 2016
- Debra Stephens, incumbent chief justice

===== Eliminated in primary =====
- Karim Merchant, criminal defense attorney
- David Shelvey, family law attorney and candidate for justice in 2024

=== Endorsements ===
Todd Bloom

Political parties

- Washington State Republican Party
Debra Stephens

Newspapers

- The Seattle Times
- The Stranger

Organizations

- Third Act

==== Results ====
Results by county: Stephens: 40–50%; 50–60%; 60–70%; Bloom: 40–50%; 50–60%

Blanket primary results
Party	Candidate	Votes	%
Nonpartisan	Debra Stephens (incumbent)	938,584	54.37
Nonpartisan	Todd Bloom	468,347	27.13
Nonpartisan	Karim Merchant	207,603	12.03
Nonpartisan	David Shelvey	107,635	6.24
Write-in		3,998	0.23
Total votes		1,726,167	100.00

== See also ==
- Washington Supreme Court
- Elections in Washington (state)
