= Andersen v. King County =

Washington Supreme Court case

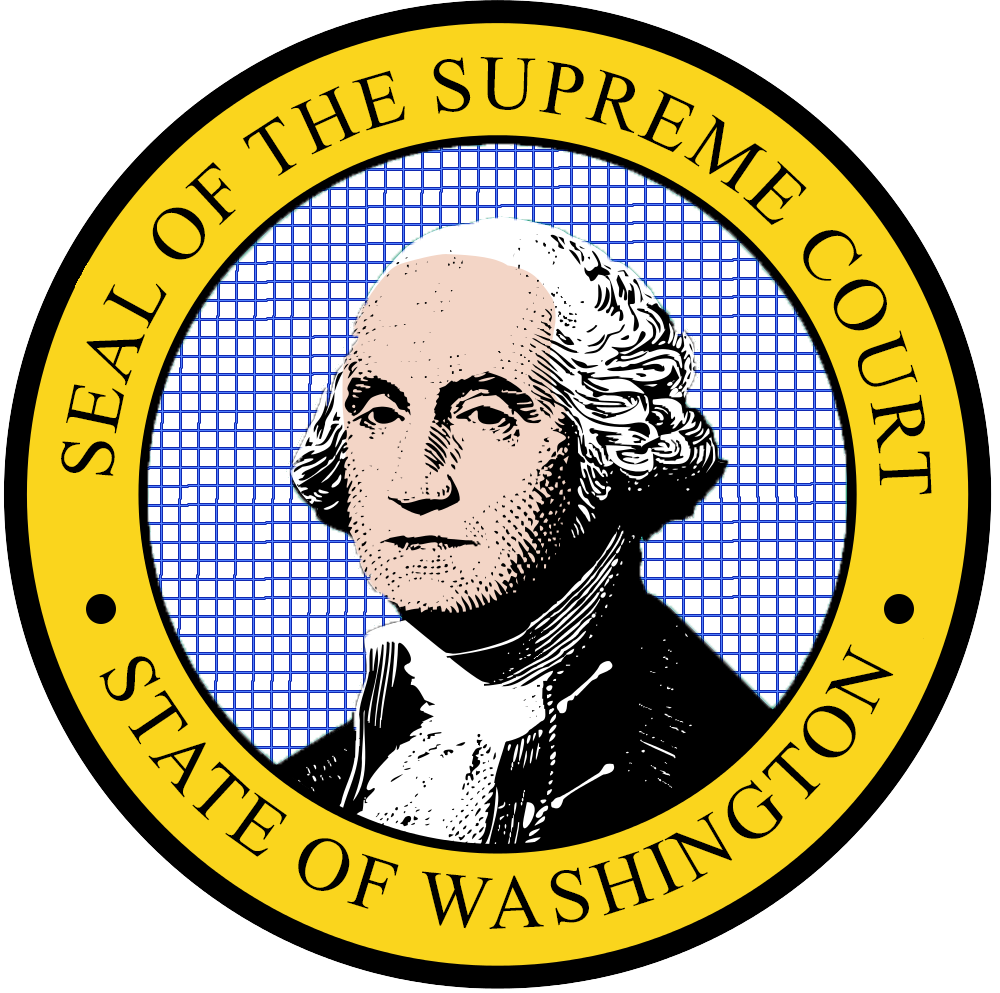
- Court: Washington Supreme Court
- Full case name: Heather Andersen and Leslie Christian; Peter Ilgenfritz and David Shull; Johanna Bender and Sherri Kokx; Janet Helson and Betty Lundquist; David Serkin-Poole and Michael Serkin-Poole; Vegavahini Subramaniam and Vaijayanthimala Nagarajan; Elizabeth Reis and Barbara Steele; and Michelle Esguerra; and Boo Torres De Esguera v. King County; Ron Sims, King County Executive; and Dean Logan, King County Director of Records, Elections and Licensing Services Division
- Argued: March 08, 2005
- Decided: July 26, 2006
- Citation: 138 P.3d 963 (Wash. 2006)

Holding
- Washington's Defense of Marriage Act (DOMA) denying same-sex couples marriage licenses does not violate the due process clause, privilege and immunity clause, or the Equal Rights Amendment (ERA) of the Washington State Constitution.

Court membership
- Chief judge: Gerry L. Alexander
- Associate judges: Bobbe Bridge, Tom Chambers, Mary Fairhurst, Charles W. Johnson, James M. Johnson, Barbara Madsen, Susan Owens, Richard B. Sanders

Case opinions
- Plurality: Madsen, joined by Alexander, Johnson
- Concurrence: Alexander
- Concurrence: Johnson, Sanders
- Dissent: Fairhurst, joined by Chambers, Owens, Bridge
- Dissent: Bridge
- Dissent: Chambers, joined by Owens

Laws applied
- Washington Consti. article I, section 3, section 12. article XXXI, section 1. RCW 26.04.020(1)(c)

Andersen v. King County, 158 Wash. 2d 1, 138 P.3d 963 (2006), formerly Andersen v. Sims, is a Washington Supreme Court case in which eight lesbian and gay couples sued King County and the state of Washington for denying them marriage licenses under the state's 1998 Defense of Marriage Act (DOMA), which defined marriage as between a man and a woman. The court ruled that banning same-sex marriage is constitutional since the legislature could reasonably believe it furthers the government's interest in promoting procreation.

The state enacted same-sex marriage in 2012. Opponents forced a referendum on the issue, and voters approved the legislation on November 6.

== Lower court decisions ==
In the case, King County Superior Court Judge William L. Downing became the first trial judge in the country to rule that a state law prohibiting same-sex marriages, or DOMA, was unconstitutional, finding for the plaintiffs on August 4, 2004. King County Superior Court Opinion by Judge William L. Downing in Andersen v. King County

Judge Downing's opinion in Andersen v. Sims hinged on the question of whether, as defendants and intervenors argued, restricting marriage to be between a man and a woman furthered the state's interest in encouraging procreation. In rejecting that argument, Judge Downing cited laws recognizing the reality that a substantial amount of procreation occurs outside of the marital relationship, and noted that "[m]any families today are created through adoption, the foster parent system and assisted reproduction technologies. The legal question is not," Downing wrote, "whether heterosexual marriage is good for the replenishment of the species through procreation. It is. The precise question is whether barring committed same-sex couples from the benefits of the civil marriage laws somehow serves the interest of encouraging procreation. There is no logical way in which it does so." [ibid]

Defendants and intervenors also contended that barring same-sex marriages advanced the state's interest in ensuring that children be raised in a healthy and nurturing environment. Judge Downing agreed the state had reason to encourage stable families but found "no reasonable expectation" that allowing couples of two men or two women to have a state-sanctioned relationship would harm the stability of families raised by a father and mother. He then turned to the impact on children:

One, then, must try to envision two categories of future children. The first category consists of those whose heterosexual parents will either neglect them or never conceive them because same-sex marriage has been legalized. The second category is those children who will be raised in a home with same-sex adult partners and who would enjoy enhanced family stability and social adjustment if these adults were granted the benefits of civil marriage. The only reasonable conclusion is that the very real second category greatly outnumbers the first theoretical one. Therefore, the goal of nurturing and providing for the emotional wellbeing of children would be rationally served by allowing same-sex couples to marry; that same goal is impaired by prohibiting such marriages. [ibid]

Judge Downing ruled that restricting the institution of marriage to opposite sex couples "is not rationally related to any legitimate or compelling state interest." [ibid] The ruling was appealed to the state Supreme Court.

== Appeal ==
In 2005, the Andersen v. Sims case was consolidated with Castle v. State, another case that was appealed to the Washington Supreme Court from a lower court in Thurston County. The combined cases were filed under Andersen v. King County and Washington Supreme Court heard oral argument on March 8, 2005. On July 26, 2006, the court ruled in a 5–4 decision that the state Defense of Marriage Act was constitutional. The majority ruled that the state DOMA does not violate the state's constitution.

== Decision ==
In the plurality opinion signed by Justices Gerry L. Alexander and Charles W. Johnson, Justice Barbara Madsen wrote that "Under this standard, DOMA is constitutional because the legislature was entitled to believe that limiting marriage to opposite-sex couples furthers procreation, essential to the survival of the human race, and furthers the well-being of children by encouraging families where children are reared in homes headed by the children's biological parents." Justice Gerry L. Alexander issued a separate concurring opinion, emphasizing the possibility that the legislature or people could expand the definition of marriage in the state. Justice James M. Johnson also issued a separate opinion, co-signed by Justice Richard B. Sanders, which concurred with the judgment only and suggested that the lower court rulings that held DOMA unconstitutional were result-oriented and disregarded the law. The reasoning in Madsen's plurality opinion is similar to that of New York's highest court in Hernandez v. Robles, which was decided on July 6, 2006.

The four justices that dissented accused the majority of relying upon "circular reasoning" in formulating their opinion. In the principal dissenting opinion, signed by Justices Tom Chambers, Susan Owens, and Bobbe J. Bridge, Justice Mary Fairhurst asked: "Would giving same-sex couples the same right that opposite-sex couples enjoy injure the state's interest in procreation and healthy child-rearing?" Justice Tom Chambers issued a separate dissenting opinion signed by Justice Susan Owens, while Justice Bobbe J. Bridge issued another dissenting opinion.

== Aftermath ==
Same-sex marriage supporters disagreed with the procreation argument and proposed Initiative 957 to challenge the court's assertion. It would have required that all marriages recognized by the state to produce offspring within three years of their solemnization. The initiative was created by the Washington Defense of Marriage Alliance, an LGBT rights group. The Washington Defense of Marriage Alliance hoped to use this to create a test case to have a court strike down the measure and highlight what they perceived as the weakness of the Andersen decision's logic. The initiative was filed on January 10, 2007, and withdrawn on July 3, 2007, after sponsors collected about 40,000 signatures, which was too few to qualify the measure for the November ballot.

A bill to legalize same-sex marriage passed the legislature and was signed by Governor Christine Gregoire on February 13, 2012, but opponents gathered enough signatures to force a voter referendum on the legislation. Voters approved the proposed legislation in November 2012, making same-sex marriage legal as of December 6 of that year.

Legal analysts noted the 2015 U.S. Supreme Court decision that legalized gay marriage everywhere closely tracked the arguments put forward in 2004 in the first trial court ruling in the country that a state defense of marriage act was unconstitutional, Judge Downing's 26-page opinion for the King County Superior Court issued August 4, 2004 -- and overturned on appeal -- that the government had no basis to argue that it banned gay marriage to benefit children. "All of this may sound obvious after the fact," wrote The Seattle Times columnist Danny Westneat, "But at the time Judge Downing's ruling marked a crucial shift in the debate on gay marriage. It’s when it started to be more about love and family, rather than a civil contract for tax or inheritance purposes."

== See also ==
- Domestic partnership in Washington (state)
- Same-sex marriage in Washington (state)
- LGBT rights in Washington (state)
