= List of female state supreme court justices =

== Female state supreme court justices ==
State	Justice	Year
Alabama	Janie Shores	1974
Alabama	Jean Brown	1995
Alabama	Patricia M. Smith	2004
Alabama	Sue Bell Cobb	2007
Alabama	Alisa Kelli Wise	2011
Alabama	Lyn Stuart	2016
Alabama	Sarah Hicks Stewart	2019
Alaska	Dana Fabe	1996
Alaska	Morgan Christen	2009
Alaska	Susan M. Carney	2016
Alaska	Jennifer S. Henderson	2021
Alaska	Aimee A. Oravec	2025
Arizona	Lorna E. Lockwood	1961
Arizona	Ruth McGregor	1998
Arizona	Rebecca White Berch	2002
Arizona	Ann Timmer	2012
Arizona	Kathryn Hackett King	2021
Arizona	Maria Elena Cruz	2025
Arkansas	Elsijane Trimble Roy	1976
Arkansas	Andree Layton Roaf	1995
Arkansas	Annabelle Clinton Imber	1997
Arkansas	Betty Dickey	2004
Arkansas	Courtney Rae Hudson	2008
Arkansas	Elana Wills	2008
Arkansas	Karen R. Baker	2010
Arkansas	Josephine L. Hart	2012
Arkansas	Rhonda K. Wood	2015
Arkansas	Barbara Womack Webb	2021
California	Rose Bird	1977
California	Joyce L. Kennard	1989
California	Kathryn Werdegar	1994
California	Janice Rogers Brown	1996
California	Carol Corrigan	2006
California	Tani Cantil-Sakauye	2011
California	Leondra Kruger	2015
California	Patricia Guerrero	2022
California	Kelli Evans	2023
Colorado	Jean Dubofsky	1979
Colorado	Mary Mullarkey	1987
Colorado	Rebecca Love Kourlis	1995
Colorado	Nancy E. Rice	1998
Colorado	Allison H. Eid	2006
Colorado	Monica Márquez	2010
Colorado	Melissa Hart	2017
Colorado	Maria Berkenkotter	2021
Connecticut	Ellen Ash Peters	1978
Connecticut	Joette Katz	1992
Connecticut	Christine S. Vertefeuille	2000
Connecticut	Carmen E. Espinosa	2013
Connecticut	Maria Araújo Kahn	2018
Connecticut	Christine Keller	2020
Connecticut	Joan K. Alexander	2022
Connecticut	Nora Dannehy	2023
Delaware	Carolyn Berger	1994
Delaware	Karen L. Valihura	2014
Delaware	Tamika Montgomery–Reeves	2019
Delaware	Abigail LeGrow	2023
District of Columbia	Catherine B. Kelly	1967
District of Columbia	Julia Cooper Mack	1975
District of Columbia	Judith W. Rogers	1983
District of Columbia	Annice M. Wagner	1990
District of Columbia	Inez Smith Reid	1995
District of Columbia	Noël A. Kramer	2005
District of Columbia	Anna Blackburne-Rigsby	2006
District of Columbia	Phyllis D. Thompson	2006
District of Columbia	Kathryn A. Oberly	2009
District of Columbia	Corinne A. Beckwith	2011
District of Columbia	Catharine F. Easterly	2012
Florida	Rosemary Barkett	1985
Florida	Barbara J. Pariente	1997
Florida	Peggy A. Quince	1998
Florida	Barbara Lagoa	2019
Florida	Jamie Grosshans	2020
Florida	Renatha Francis	2022
Florida	Meredith Sasso	2023
Georgia	Leah Ward Sears	1992
Georgia	Carol W. Hunstein	1992
Georgia	Britt Grant	2017
Georgia	Sarah Hawkins Warren	2018
Georgia	Carla Wong McMillian	2020
Georgia	Shawn Ellen LaGrua	2021
Georgia	Verda Colvin	2021
Hawaii	Rhoda V. Lewis	1959
Hawaii	Paula A. Nakayama	1993
Hawaii	Sabrina McKenna	2011
Hawaii	Lisa M. Ginoza	2023
Idaho	Linda Copple Trout	1992
Idaho	Cathy Silak	1993
Idaho	Robyn Brody	2017
Idaho	Colleen Zahn	2021
Idaho	Cynthia Meyer	2023
Illinois	Mary Ann McMorrow	1992
Illinois	Rita B. Garman	2001
Illinois	Mary Jane Theis	2010
Illinois	Anne M. Burke	2006
Illinois	Lisa Holder White	2022
Illinois	Joy Cunningham	2022
Illinois	Elizabeth Rochford	2022
Illinois	Mary K. O'Brien	2022
Indiana	Myra Consetta Selby	1995
Indiana	Loretta Rush	2012
Iowa	Linda Kinnedy Neuman	1986
Iowa	Marsha Ternus	1993
Iowa	Susan Christensen	2018
Iowa	Dana Oxley	2020
Kansas	Kay McFarland	1977
Kansas	Carol A. Beier	2003
Kansas	Marla Luckert	2003
Kansas	Nancy Moritz	2011
Kansas	Evelyn Wilson	2019
Kansas	Melissa Standridge	2020
Kansas	Larkin Walsh	2025
Kentucky	Sara Walter Combs	1993
Kentucky	Janet Stumbo	1993
Kentucky	Lisabeth Tabor Hughes	2007
Kentucky	Mary C. Noble	2007
Kentucky	Michelle M. Keller	2013
Kentucky	Debra H. Lambert	2019
Kentucky	Angela McCormick Bisig	2023
Kentucky	Pamela R. Goodwine	2025
Louisiana	Catherine D. Kimball	1992
Louisiana	Bernette Joshua Johnson	1994
Louisiana	Jeannette Knoll	1997
Louisiana	Piper D. Griffin	2021
Maine	Caroline Duby Glassman	1983
Maine	Leigh Saufley	1993
Maine	Susan W. Calkins	1998
Maine	Ellen Gorman	2007
Maine	Catherine Connors	2020
Maryland	Rita C. Davidson	1979
Maryland	Irma S. Raker	1994
Maryland	Lynne A. Battaglia	2001
Maryland	Mary Ellen Barbera	2008
Maryland	Sally D. Adkins	2008
Maryland	Shirley M. Watts	2013
Maryland	Michele D. Hotten	2015
Maryland	Brynja McDivitt Booth	2019
Maryland	Angela M. Eaves	2022
Massachusetts	Ruth Abrams	1978
Massachusetts	Margaret H. Marshall	1996
Massachusetts	Judith Cowin	1999
Massachusetts	Martha B. Sosman	2000
Massachusetts	Margot Botsford	2007
Massachusetts	Barbara Lenk	2011
Massachusetts	Kimberly S. Budd	2016
Massachusetts	Elspeth B. Cypher	2017
Massachusetts	Dalila Argaez Wendlandt	2020
Massachusetts	Bessie Dewar	2024
Massachusetts	Gabrielle Wolohojian	2024
Michigan	Mary S. Coleman	1973
Michigan	Dorothy Comstock Riley	1982
Michigan	Patricia Boyle	1983
Michigan	Elizabeth Weaver	1995
Michigan	Marilyn Jean Kelly	1997
Michigan	Maura D. Corrigan	1999
Michigan	Diane Hathaway	2009
Michigan	Mary Beth Kelly	2011
Michigan	Bridget Mary McCormack	2013
Michigan	Joan Larsen	2015
Michigan	Elizabeth T. Clement	2017
Michigan	Megan Cavanagh	2019
Michigan	Elizabeth M. Welch	2021
Michigan	Kyra Harris Bolden	2023
Michigan	Kimberly Thomas	2025
Minnesota	Rosalie E. Wahl	1977
Minnesota	Mary Jeanne Coyne	1982
Minnesota	Esther Tomljanovich	1990
Minnesota	Kathleen A. Blatz	1996
Minnesota	Sandra Gardebring Ogren	1991
Minnesota	Joan N. Ericksen	1998
Minnesota	Helen Meyer	2002
Minnesota	Lorie Skjerven Gildea	2006
Minnesota	Wilhelmina Wright	2012
Minnesota	Natalie Hudson	2015
Minnesota	Margaret H. Chutich	2016
Minnesota	Anne McKeig	2016
Minnesota	Sarah Hennesy	2024
Mississippi	Lenore L. Prather	1982
Mississippi	Kay B. Cobb	1999
Mississippi	Ann Hannaford Lamar	2007
Mississippi	Dawn H. Beam	2016
Mississippi	Jenifer Branning	2025
Missouri	Ann K. Covington	1988
Missouri	Laura Denvir Stith	2001
Missouri	Mary Rhodes Russell	2004
Missouri	Patricia Breckenridge	2007
Missouri	Robin Ransom	2021
Missouri	Kelly C. Broniec	2023
Missouri	Ginger Gooch	2023
Montana	Diane Barz	1989
Montana	Karla M. Gray	1991
Montana	Patricia O'Brien Cotter	2000
Montana	Beth Baker	2011
Montana	Laurie McKinnon	2013
Montana	Ingrid Gustafson	2018
Montana	Katherine M. Bidegaray	2025
Montana	Amy Eddy	2027
Nebraska	Lindsey Miller-Lerman	1998
Nebraska	Stephanie F. Stacy	2015
Nevada	Miriam Shearing	1992
Nevada	Deborah Agosti	1999
Nevada	Nancy A. Becker	1999
Nevada	Nancy Saitta	2007
Nevada	Kristina Pickering	2009
Nevada	Lidia S. Stiglich	2016
Nevada	Abbi Silver	2019
Nevada	Elissa F. Cadish	2019
Nevada	Patricia Lee	2022
Nevada	Linda M. Bell	2023
New Hampshire	Linda S. Dalianis	2000
New Hampshire	Anna Hantz Marconi	2017
New Hampshire	Melissa Beth Countway	2023
New Jersey	Marie L. Garibaldi	1982
New Jersey	Deborah Poritz	1996
New Jersey	Virginia Long	1999
New Jersey	Jaynee LaVecchia	2000
New Jersey	Helen E. Hoens	2006
New Jersey	Anne M. Patterson	2011
New Jersey	Fabiana Pierre-Louis	2020
New Jersey	Rachel Wainer Apter	2022
New Mexico	Mary Coon Walters	1984
New Mexico	Pamela B. Minzner	1994
New Mexico	Petra Jimenez Maes	1998
New Mexico	Barbara J. Vigil	2012
New Mexico	Judith Nakamura	2015
New Mexico	C. Shannon Bacon	2019
New Mexico	Julie J. Vargas	2021
New Mexico	Briana Zamora	2021
New York	Judith Kaye	1983
New York	Carmen Beauchamp Ciparick	1994
New York	Victoria Graffeo	2000
New York	Susan Phillips Read	2003
New York	Jenny Rivera	2013
New York	Sheila Abdus-Salaam	2013
New York	Leslie Stein	2015
New York	Janet DiFiore	2016
New York	Madeline Singas	2021
New York	Shirley Troutman	2022
New York	Caitlin Halligan	2023
North Carolina	Susie Sharp	1962
North Carolina	Rhoda Billings	1986
North Carolina	Sarah Parker	1992
North Carolina	Patricia Timmons-Goodson	2006
North Carolina	Robin E. Hudson	2007
North Carolina	Barbara Jackson	2011
North Carolina	Cheri Beasley	2012
North Carolina	Anita Earls	2019
North Carolina	Tamara P. Barringer	2021
North Carolina	Allison Riggs	2023
North Dakota	Beryl J. Levine	1985
North Dakota	Mary Muehlen Maring	1996
North Dakota	Carol Ronning Kapsner	1998
North Dakota	Lisa K. Fair McEvers	2014
Ohio	Florence E. Allen	1923
Ohio	Blanche Krupansky	1981
Ohio	Alice Robie Resnick	1989
Ohio	Evelyn Lundberg Stratton	1996
Ohio	Maureen O'Connor	2003
Ohio	Judith Ann Lanzinger	2005
Ohio	Yvette McGee Brown	2011
Ohio	Sharon L. Kennedy	2012
Ohio	Judith L. French	2013
Ohio	Mary DeGenaro	2018
Ohio	Melody J. Stewart	2019
Ohio	Jennifer Brunner	2021
Ohio	Megan E. Shanahan	2025
Ohio	Marilyn Zayas	2027
Oklahoma	Alma Bell Wilson	1982
Oklahoma	Yvonne Kauger	1984
Oklahoma	Noma Gurich	2011
Oklahoma	Dana Kuehn	2021
Oregon	Betty Roberts	1982
Oregon	Susan P. Graber	1990
Oregon	Susan M. Leeson	1998
Oregon	Martha Lee Walters	2006
Oregon	Virginia Linder	2007
Oregon	Lynn Nakamoto	2016
Oregon	Meagan Flynn	2017
Oregon	Rebecca Duncan	2017
Oregon	Adrienne Nelson	2018
Oregon	Aruna Masih	2023
Pennsylvania	Anne X. Alpern	1961
Pennsylvania	Juanita Kidd Stout	1988
Pennsylvania	Cynthia Baldwin	2006
Pennsylvania	Jane Cutler Greenspan	2008
Pennsylvania	Joan Orie Melvin	2010
Pennsylvania	Debra Todd	2008
Pennsylvania	Christine Donohue	2008
Pennsylvania	Sallie Updyke Mundy	2016
Rhode Island	Florence K. Murray	1979
Rhode Island	Victoria Lederberg	1993
Rhode Island	Maureen McKenna Goldberg	1997
Rhode Island	Erin Lynch Prata	2021
Rhode Island	Melissa A. Long	2021
South Carolina	Jean H. Toal	1988
South Carolina	Kaye Gorenflo Hearn	2009
South Dakota	Judith Meierhenry	2002
South Dakota	Lori S. Wilbur	2011
South Dakota	Janine M. Kern	2014
South Dakota	Patricia DeVaney	2019
Tennessee	Martha Craig Daughtrey	1990
Tennessee	Penny J. White	1994
Tennessee	Janice M. Holder	1996
Tennessee	Cornelia A. Clark	2005
Tennessee	Sharon Gail Lee	2009
Tennessee	Holly M. Kirby	2014
Tennessee	Sarah K. Campbell	2022
Tennessee	Mary L. Wagner	2024
Texas	Ruby Kless Sondock	1982
Texas	Barbara Culver	1988
Texas	Rose Spector	1992
Texas	Priscilla Richman	1995
Texas	Deborah Hankinson	1997
Texas	Harriet O'Neill	1999
Texas	Eva Guzman	2009
Texas	Debra Lehrmann	2010
Texas	Jane Bland	2019
Texas	Rebeca Huddle	2020
Texas	Maggie Ellis	2027
Texas	Kristen Hawkins	2027
Texas	Chari Kelly	2027
Texas	Gisela Triana	2027
Utah	Christine M. Durham	1982
Utah	Jill Parrish	2003
Utah	Paige Petersen	2017
Utah	Diana Hagen	2022
Utah	Jill Pohlman	2022
Vermont	Denise R. Johnson	1990
Vermont	Marilyn Skoglund	1997
Vermont	Beth Robinson	2011
Vermont	Karen Carroll	2019
Vermont	Nancy Waples	2022
Virginia	Elizabeth B. Lacy	1988
Virginia	Barbara Milano Keenan	1991
Virginia	Cynthia D. Kinser	1997
Virginia	Elizabeth A. McClanahan	2011
Virginia	Jane Marum Roush	2015
Virginia	Cleo Powell	2011
Virginia	Teresa M. Chafin	2019
Washington	Carolyn R. Dimmick	1981
Washington	Barbara Madsen	1993
Washington	Barbara Durham	1995
Washington	Rosselle Pekelis	1995
Washington	Faith Ireland	1999
Washington	Bobbe Bridge	2001
Washington	Susan Owens	2001
Washington	Mary Fairhurst	2003
Washington	Debra L. Stephens	2008
Washington	Sheryl Gordon McCloud	2013
Washington	Mary Yu	2014
Washington	Raquel Montoya-Lewis	2020
Washington	Helen Whitener	2020
Washington	Colleen Melody	2026
Washington	Jaime Hawk	2027
West Virginia	Margaret Workman	1988
West Virginia	Robin Davis	1996
West Virginia	Beth Walker	2017
West Virginia	C. Haley Bunn	2022
Wisconsin	Shirley Abrahamson	1976
Wisconsin	Janine P. Geske	1993
Wisconsin	Ann Walsh Bradley	1995
Wisconsin	Diane S. Sykes	1999
Wisconsin	Patience D. Roggensack	2003
Wisconsin	Annette Ziegler	2007
Wisconsin	Rebecca Bradley	2015
Wisconsin	Rebecca Dallet	2018
Wisconsin	Jill Karofsky	2020
Wisconsin	Janet Protasiewicz	2023
Wisconsin	Chris Taylor	2026
Wyoming	Marilyn S. Kite	2000
Wyoming	Kate M. Fox	2014
Wyoming	Lynne J. Boomgaarden	2017
Wyoming	Kari Jo Gray	2018
Wyoming	Bridget Hill	2025

== First female justices ==
Below is a list of the names of the first woman to sit on the highest court of their respective states in the United States.

The first state with a female justice was Ohio; Florence E. Allen was named to the bench in 1923.

State	Justice	Year
Alabama	Janie Shores	1974
Alaska	Dana Fabe	1996
Arizona	Lorna E. Lockwood	1961
Arkansas	Elsijane Trimble Roy	1976
California	Rose Bird	1977
Colorado	Jean Dubofsky	1979
Connecticut	Ellen Ash Peters	1978
Delaware	Carolyn Berger	1994
District of Columbia	Catherine B. Kelly	1967
Florida	Rosemary Barkett	1985
Georgia	Leah Ward Sears	1992
Hawaii	Rhoda V. Lewis	1959
Idaho	Linda Copple Trout	1992
Illinois	Mary Ann G. McMorrow	1992
Indiana	Myra Consetta Selby	1995
Iowa	Linda Kinnedy Neuman	1986
Kansas	Kay McFarland	1977
Kentucky	Sara W. Combs	1993
Louisiana	Catherine D. Kimball	1992
Maine	Caroline Duby Glassman	1983
Maryland	Rita C. Davidson	1979
Massachusetts	Ruth Abrams	1978
Michigan	Mary Coleman	1973
Minnesota	Rosalie E. Wahl	1977
Mississippi	Lenore L. Prather	1982
Missouri	Ann K. Covington	1988
Montana	Diane Barz	1989
Nebraska	Lindsey Miller-Lerman	1998
Nevada	Miriam Shearing	1992
New Hampshire	Linda S. Dalianis	2000
New Jersey	Marie L. Garibaldi	1982
New Mexico	Mary Coon Walters	1984
New York	Judith Kaye	1983
North Carolina	Susie Sharp	1962
North Dakota	Beryl J. Levine	1985
Ohio	Florence E. Allen	1923
Oklahoma	Alma Bell Wilson	1982
Oregon	Betty Roberts	1982
Pennsylvania	Anne X. Alpern	1961
Rhode Island	Florence K. Murray	1979
South Carolina	Jean H. Toal	1988
South Dakota	Judith Meierhenry	2002
Tennessee	Martha Craig Daughtrey	1990
Texas	Ruby Kless Sondock	1982
Utah	Christine M. Durham	1982
Vermont	Denise R. Johnson	1990
Virginia	Elizabeth B. Lacy	1988
Washington	Carolyn R. Dimmick	1981
West Virginia	Margaret Workman	1988
Wisconsin	Shirley Abrahamson	1976
Wyoming	Marilyn Stebner Kite	2000
United States Supreme Court	Sandra Day O'Connor	1981

== Female chief justices ==
State	Chief justice	Year
Arizona	Lorna E. Lockwood	1965
Arizona	Lorna E. Lockwood	1970
North Carolina	Susie Sharp	1975
California	Rose Bird	1977
Michigan	Mary S. Coleman	1979
Connecticut	Ellen Ash Peters	1984
North Carolina	Rhoda Billings	1986
Florida	Rosemary Barkett	1992
Missouri	Ann K. Covington	1993
Nevada	Miriam Shearing	1993
New York	Judith Kaye	1993
Kansas	Kay McFarland	1995
Oklahoma	Alma Wilson	1995
Washington	Barbara Durham	1995
Wisconsin	Shirley Abrahamson	1996
New Jersey	Deborah Poritz	1996
Alaska	Dana Fabe	1996
Idaho	Linda Copple Trout	1997
Minnesota	Kathleen A. Blatz	1998
Colorado	Mary Mullarkey	1998
Massachusetts	Margaret H. Marshall	1999
South Carolina	Jean H. Toal	2000
Maine	Leigh Saufley	2001
Montana	Karla M. Gray	2001
Illinois	Mary Ann McMorrow	2002
Utah	Christine M. Durham	2002
New Mexico	Petra Jimenez Maes	2003
Nevada	Nancy A. Becker	2005
Florida	Barbara Pariente	2004
Arizona	Ruth McGregor	2005
Georgia	Leah Ward Sears	2005
North Carolina	Sarah Parker	2006
Iowa	Marsha Ternus	2006
Oklahoma	Yvonne Kauger	2007
Alabama	Sue Bell Cobb	2007
Connecticut	Chase T. Rogers	2007
Missouri	Laura Denvir Stith	2007
Tennessee	Janice M. Holder	2008
Florida	Peggy Quince	2008
Georgia	Carol W. Hunstein	2009
Louisiana	Catherine D. Kimball	2009
West Virginia	Margaret Workman	2009
Arizona	Rebecca White Berch	2009
Minnesota	Lorie Skjerven Gildea	2010
Tennessee	Cornelia A. Clark	2010
Washington	Barbara Madsen	2010
Wyoming	Marilyn S. Kite	2010
New Hampshire	Linda S. Dalianis	2011
Ohio	Maureen O'Connor	2011
Virginia	Cynthia D. Kinser	2011
California	Tani Cantil-Sakauye	2011
Maryland	Mary Ellen Barbera	2013
Illinois	Rita B. Garman	2013
Louisiana	Bernette Joshua Johnson	2013
Missouri	Mary Rhodes Russell	2013
Colorado	Nancy E. Rice	2014
Indiana	Loretta Rush	2014
Tennessee	Sharon G. Lee	2014
New Mexico	Barbara J. Vigil	2014
Missouri	Patricia Breckenridge	2015
Wisconsin	Patience D. Roggensack	2015
New York	Janet DiFiore	2016
Alabama	Lyn Stuart	2016
New Mexico	Judith Nakamura	2017
Washington	Mary Fairhurst	2017
Oregon	Martha Lee Walters	2018
North Carolina	Cheri Beasley	2019
Oklahoma	Noma Gurich	2019
Illinois	Anne M. Burke	2019
Kansas	Marla Luckert	2019
Michigan	Bridget Mary McCormack	2019
West Virginia	Beth Walker	2019
Washington	Debra L. Stephens	2020
Nevada	Kristina Pickering	2020
Iowa	Susan Christensen	2020
Massachusetts	Kimberly S. Budd	2020
Wisconsin	Annette Ziegler	2021
Maine	Valerie Stanfill	2021
Wyoming	Kate M. Fox	2021
Pennsylvania	Debra Todd	2022
Illinois	Mary Jane Theis	2022
Michigan	Elizabeth T. Clement	2022
Ohio	Sharon L. Kennedy	2023
Oregon	Meagan Flynn	2023
West Virginia	Beth Walker	2023
California	Patricia Guerrero	2023
Nevada	Lidia S. Stiglich	2023
Missouri	Mary Rhodes Russell	2023
Minnesota	Natalie Hudson	2023
Tennessee	Holly M. Kirby	2023
Nevada	Elissa F. Cadish	2024
Arizona	Ann Timmer	2024
Colorado	Monica Márquez	2024
Arkansas	Karen R. Baker	2025
Kentucky	Debra H. Lambert	2025
Alaska	Susan M. Carney	2025
Alabama	Sarah Hicks Stewart	2025
Michigan	Megan Cavanagh	2025
Wisconsin	Ann Walsh Bradley	2025
Wyoming	Lynne J. Boomgaarden	2025
Wisconsin	Jill Karofsky	2025
Virginia	Cleo Powell	2026
West Virginia	C. Haley Bunn	2026
New Mexico	Julie J. Vargas	2026

== Instances of a female-majority court ==
Throughout history, men have outnumbered women on the highest court in each state. Instances of female-majority courts remain an uncommon occurrence, but in recent decades they have appeared more frequently. Currently, the United States Supreme Court has the highest percentage of women justices it has ever had, yet there has still never been a majority.

State	Year
All-Woman Supreme Court (special sitting of the Supreme Court of Texas for a single case)	1925
Alaska	2025–present
Arkansas	2015–present
California	2011–2017; 2022–present
District of Columbia	2006–2013, 2017–present
Idaho	2023–present
Illinois	2023–present
Maryland	2013–present
Michigan	1997, 2009, 2021–present
Minnesota	1991, 2016–present
Missouri	2023–present
Nevada	2019–present
New Jersey	2011
New Mexico	2015–present
New York	2003–2008, 2013–2017, 2022, 2023-present
North Carolina	2011
Ohio	2002, 2005, 2011, 2018–2022, 2027-Present
Oregon	2017–present
Rhode Island	2021–present
Tennessee	2009–2021, 2024–present
Utah	2021–present
Vermont	2017–present
Washington	2013–present
Wisconsin	2003–2004, 2007–present
West Virginia	2017–present
Wyoming	2018–present
