= McCleary v. State =

McCleary v. State of Washington
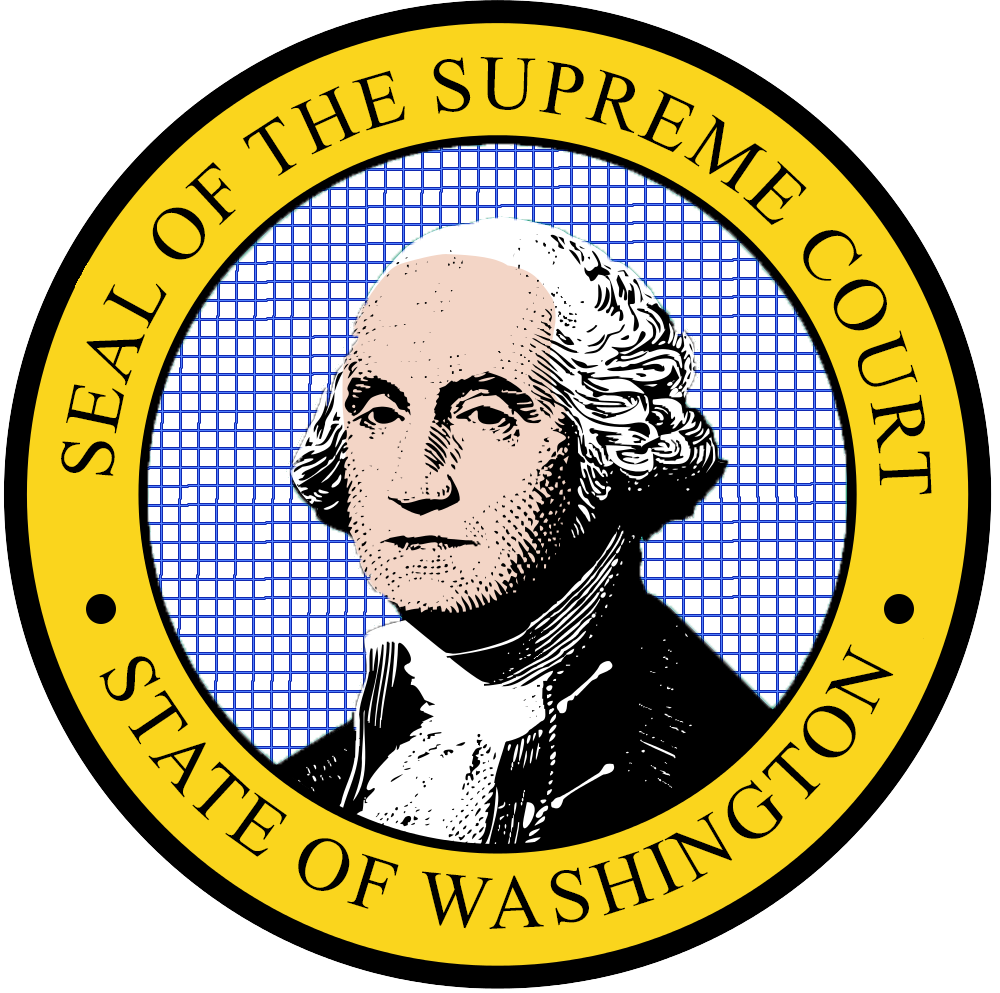
- Full case name: Mathew and Stephanie McCleary, on their own behalf and on behalf of Kelesy and Carter McCleary, their two children in Washington’s public schools; Robert and Patty Venema, on their own behalf and on behalf of Halie and Robbie Venema, their two children in Washington’s public schools; and Network For Excellence in Washington Schools (“NEWS”), a state wide coalition of community groups, public school districts, and education organizations, Respondents/Cross-Appellants, v. State of Washington, Appellant/Cross-Respondent.
- Court: Washington Supreme Court
- Decided: January 5, 2012
- Citations: 269 P.3d 227; 173 Wash. 2d 477; 276 Ed. Law Rep. 1011

Case history
- Appealed from: King County Superior Court

Court membership
- Chief judge: Gerry L. Alexander
- Associate judges: Tom Chambers, Mary Fairhurst, Charles W. Johnson, James M. Johnson, Barbara Madsen, Susan Owens, Debra L. Stephens, Charles K. Wiggins

Case opinions
- Decision by: Debra L. Stephens
- Concurrence: Charles W. Johnson, Tom Chambers, Susan Owens, Mary E. Fairhurst, Charles K. Wiggins, Gerry L. Alexander
- Concur/dissent: Barbara A. Madsen, joined by James M. Johnson

Mathew and Stephanie McCleary et al., v. State of Washington (short form: McCleary v. Washington), commonly known as the McCleary Decision, was a lawsuit against the State of Washington. The case alleged that the state, in the body of the state legislature, had failed to meet the state constitutional duty (in Article IX, Section 1) "to make ample provision for the education of all children residing within its borders."

== King County Superior Court ==
Judge John Erlick sided with the Plaintiffs, stating that the State was indeed failing to adequately provide for basic education, saying "State funding is not ample, it is not stable, and it is not dependable."

== Washington State Supreme Court ==
On January 5, 2012, the Supreme Court agreed with the opinion of the King County Superior Court that the State was not fulfilling its obligation to fully fund education in the state, with some justices dissenting in part on the question of continued judicial oversight.

== Subsequent developments ==
In the 2013 Legislative Session, the State Legislature increased school funding by 11.4% to a total of $15.2 billion. They also passed three major reform bills in an attempt to further comply with the McCleary ruling.

Despite these changes, the Supreme Court did not find the State in compliance. On January 9, 2014 the Supreme Court issued an order setting a deadline of April 30, 2014 for the legislature to come up with an adequate funding plan.

On August 13, 2015, the Supreme Court ordered a $100,000 a day fine. This money was to be placed in a special account that would be used to benefit public education. The Court also urged the Governor at the time, Jay Inslee, to call a special session of the legislature to pass a funding plan to bring the State into compliance.

On June 7, 2018, the Supreme Court declared the state had fully covered the funding of basic education, lifting the contempt order and $100,000 a day fine, ending any judicial oversight of the case.

In the McCleary ruling, the Supreme Court cited teacher pay as a primary issue with the failure of the state to fund public education. In response to the court's satisfaction with the state's amended funding models, the state's teachers union, Washington Education Association, promoted the increase in state public school funding as justification to increase teacher salaries, and sponsored multiple teachers' strikes to demand them.

On April 11, 2019, at least one school district (Spokane Public Schools) announced significant staffing cuts, which it tied directly to the McCleary decision. Although the decision increased state funding of school districts it also reduced funding from local levies resulting in a projected shortfall of almost $31 million for the district in the 2019-20 school year. The net staff reduction of about 8% represented 325 paid positions, impacted either through layoff or reduction in hours.

The court identified teacher salaries as one of the basic components (along with class size) of an ample education. Teacher salaries have risen since McCleary, and as of 2023, average teacher salaries are the fifth highest of any state. Overall spending on education is among the top 20 states.
