= 2004 Washington Supreme Court election =

Washington State's Supreme Court has 9 members elected at large. In 2004, 3 members of the court were up for election.

== State Supreme Court Justice Position #1 ==
Washington State Supreme Court Justice Position #1 election, 2004
Party	Candidate	Votes	%
Nonpartisan	Jim Johnson	1,178,194	52.0286
Nonpartisan	Mary Kay Becker	1,086,319	47.9714
Total votes		2,264,513	100.00

== State Supreme Court Justice Position #5 ==
Washington State Supreme Court Justice Position #5 election, 2004
Party	Candidate	Votes	%
Nonpartisan	Barbara Madsen	1,892,177	100.00
Total votes		1,892,177	100.00

== State Supreme Court Justice Position #6 ==
Washington State Supreme Court Justice Position #6 election, 2004
Party	Candidate	Votes	%
Nonpartisan	Richard B. Sanders	1,310,998	61.0313
Nonpartisan	Terry Sebring	837,077	38.9687
Total votes		2,148,075	100.00
