= Don White =

Don or Donald White may refer to:

- Don White (baseball) (1919–1987), Major League Baseball outfielder
- Don White (rugby union) (1926–2007), English rugby union footballer
- Donald White (rugby union), Scottish international rugby union player
- Don White (racing driver) (1928–2016), American racing driver
- Donald White (basketball), head basketball coach at Rutgers university
- Donald C. White (born 1950), Pennsylvania state senator
- Donald F. White (1908–2002), Canadian-born American architect and engineer, of African descent
- Donald H. White (born 1921), American composer
- Donald M. White (1915–1995), American Navy rear admiral
- Don White (1935–1995), Opera Rara co-founder
- Don Anthony White, tried for murder in State v. White
