= James M. Johnson =

James M. Johnson may refer to:

- James M. Johnson (judge), justice of the Washington Supreme Court
- James M. Johnson (politician) (1832–1913), lieutenant governor of Arkansas
