= William Downing =

William Downing may refer to:

- William L. Downing (born 1949), American judge
- William Downing (MP) for Orford (UK Parliament constituency)
- Bill Downing a.k.a. William F. Downing, Wild West outlaw
