= Barbara Madsen =

American judge (born 1952)

Chief Justice of the Washington Supreme Court
- In office January 11, 2010 – January 9, 2017
- Preceded by: Gerry L. Alexander
- Succeeded by: Mary Fairhurst

Justice of the Washington Supreme Court
- In office January 1, 1993 – April 3, 2026
- Preceded by: Fred H. Dore
- Succeeded by: Theo Angelis

Personal details
- Born: Barbara Rupnick; March 1, 1952 (age 74) Chicago, Illinois, U.S.
- Spouse: Donald Madsen (m. 1980; died 2022)
- Education: Western Washington University (attended); University of Washington (BA); Gonzaga University (JD)

Barbara A. Madsen (née Rupnick; born March 1, 1952) is an American lawyer who was an associate justice of the Washington Supreme Court from 1993 to 2026. She joined the court in 1993 as the first woman to be popularly elected to the Court in Washington state history. She was re-elected in 1998, 2004, 2010, and 2016. In her years on the Washington Supreme Court, Madsen sat in judgement on thousands of cases.

On November 5, 2009, Madsen was unanimously elected by her peers to serve as Chief Justice of the Washington Supreme Court. She was sworn in as Chief Justice on January 11, 2010, replacing retiring Chief Justice Gerry L. Alexander. She served two terms as Chief Justice, the second longest serving in Washington state history. In September 2025, Madsen surpassed Mark A. Fullerton to become the second longest-serving Supreme Court Justice in Washington state history, behind her colleague Justice Charles W. Johnson.

Madsen was born in Chicago, the daughter of Edward John and Marion Durkin Rupnick. She moved as a child to Renton, Washington, and graduated from Hazen High School. After attending Western Washington University, she graduated from the University of Washington in 1974, and in 1977, she earned her Juris Doctor from Gonzaga University School of Law. She married Donald Madsen in 1980, and they would have four children.

After completing law school, Madsen worked as a public defender in King County and Snohomish County. In 1982, she joined the Seattle City Attorney's Office and was appointed Special Prosecutor in 1984. Seattle Mayor Charles Royer appointed Madsen in 1988 to the Seattle Municipal Court bench. After serving as the Presiding Judge of the Seattle Municipal Court, she ran for the Washington Supreme Court in 1992 to fill the vacancy left by retiring Justice Fred H. Dore.

Madsen married Donald Madsen in 1980. They remained married until his death from ALS in 2022. They had four children together: Sam, Hillary, Eleanor, and Beau.

In October 2018, Madsen concurred when the majority invalidated the state's death penalty. The court found its imposition to be racially biased and therefore in violation of the Constitution of Washington.

Madsen retired from the Supreme Court of Washington on April 3, 2026.

== See also ==
- List of female state supreme court justices

Legal offices
Preceded by Fred H. Dore	Justice of the Washington Supreme Court; 1993–2026	Succeeded by Theo Angelis
Preceded by Gerry L. Alexander	Chief Justice of the Washington Supreme Court; 2010–2017	Succeeded by Mary Fairhurst
