= Carolyn Berger =

American judge

Carolyn Berger is a former justice of the Delaware Supreme Court, and a former vice chancellor on the Delaware Court of Chancery. She was the first female member of both courts.

== Early life ==
Berger received a B.A. from the University of Rochester in 1969, an M.A. in Elementary Education from Boston University School of Education in 1971, and a J.D. from Boston University School of Law in 1976.

== Career ==
Before joining the bench, she served as a state deputy attorney general from 1976 to 1979, and then was in private practice as Skadden, Arps, Slate Meagher & Flom from 1979 to 1984.

She was appointed to the Court of Chancery in 1984. She was appointed to the Delaware Supreme Court by then-Governor Tom Carper on July 22, 1994, reappointed in 2006, and retired on September 1, 2014.

While serving on the Delaware Supreme Court, Justice Berger participated in landmark decisions addressing directors’ fiduciary duties and corporate governance issues. She authored the Lyondell Chemical Co. opinion, finding that the directors acted properly when they agreed to sell the company, and the Unocal Exploration Co. opinion, approving a “short form” merger without regard to price. Justice Berger also participated in the Walt Disney Co. executive compensation decision and the Martha Stewart director independence decision, among many others.

She has also served on Singapore's International Commercial Court.

Justice Randy J. Holland nominated her for the prestigious Trailblazer Award in 1997.

During her career, Justice Berger has been involved in community service as a member of the board of directors of the Delaware Region of the National Conference of Christians & Jews, Inc., the Jewish Federation of Delaware, and The Milton & Hattie Kutz Home, Inc. She also served as president of the Kutz Home and chair of its search committee for a new executive director. Justice Berger is a member of the American Law Institute and the American Bar Foundation. She was an adjunct professor and taught corporate law at Widener University School of Law.

== Personal life ==
She is married to Delaware Superior Court Judge Fred Silverman.

== See also ==
- List of female state supreme court justices
- List of Jewish American jurists
