= Mary Yu =

American judge (born 1957)

Justice of the Washington Supreme Court
- In office May 20, 2014 – December 31, 2025
- Appointed by: Jay Inslee
- Preceded by: James Johnson
- Succeeded by: Colleen Melody

Personal details
- Born: Mary Isabel Yu; 1957 (age 68–69) Chicago, Illinois, U.S.
- Education: Dominican University (BA); Loyola University Chicago (MA); University of Notre Dame (JD)

Mary Isabel Yu (born 1957) is an American lawyer who served as an associate justice of the Washington Supreme Court from 2014 to 2025. She served as a judge of the King County Superior Court from 2000 to 2014. She was the state's first openly gay justice, as well as the first Asian American and first Latina justice.

== Early life and education ==
Yu was born in Chicago, Illinois to a Chinese father and Mexican mother. She graduated from St. Mary's High School in 1975. Yu then attended Dominican University and graduated in 1979 with a degree in theology. In 1989, Yu earned a graduate degree in theology from Mundelein of Loyola University.

After completing her undergraduate education, Yu went to work for the Roman Catholic Archdiocese of Chicago. She was initially hired by Rev. Francis J. Kane as a secretary for the Office of Peace and Justice for the Archdiocese of Chicago, but eventually rose to become director of the Office of Peace and Justice.

Yu enrolled at Notre Dame Law School in 1990. She graduated with her J.D. degree in 1993.

== Legal career and judicial service ==
In 1999, King County Prosecuting Attorney Norm Maleng named Yu as his deputy chief of staff.

In 2000, Washington Governor Gary Locke appointed Yu to replace retiring judge Janice Niemi on the King County Superior Court.

Yu was considered a leading contender to replace Justice Bobbe Bridge on the Washington Supreme Court when Bridge retired in December 2007. Ultimately, Governor Christine Gregoire appointed Debra L. Stephens to fill the vacancy.

On December 9, 2012, at midnight, Mary Yu officiated the first same-sex marriages in Washington state. Judge Yu's name (coincidentally pronounced as "marry you") was deemed "the perfect name for the job" by The Stranger columnist Dominic Holden.

== Appointment to Washington Supreme Court ==
On May 1, 2014, Judge Yu was appointed by Washington Governor Jay Inslee to the Washington Supreme Court, making her the first openly LGBTQ member of the court, in addition to the first Latina-American and Asian-American. She is the 11th woman to serve on the Washington Supreme Court, the first person of Asian descent, the third person of Hispanic descent, and the first Hispanic woman. Yu, who is openly gay, is also the first LGBT person to hold this position. Yu is one of ten LGBT state supreme court justices currently serving in the United States.

She was sworn in on May 20, 2014 as an associate justice of the Washington Supreme Court. Justice Yu ran unopposed in 2015 to complete the term and was the highest vote getter in the State. Justice Yu was subsequently elected to the Supreme Court for a six-year term in 2016.

In October 2018, Yu joined the majority when the court abolished the state's death penalty because they found its racist imposition violated the Constitution of Washington.

Yu retired from the court on December 31, 2025.

== Personal life ==
Yu resides in Seattle and in Olympia. On March 16, 2021, she appeared on Jimmy Kimmel Live! where she was recognized for the appropriateness of her name as she also is a frequent wedding officiant. On May 24, 2022, she threw the ceremonial first pitch for a game between the Seattle Mariners and Oakland Athletics.

== Awards ==
Yu is a Distinguished Jurist in Residence at Seattle University School of Law. In 1984, Yu received the Caritas Veritas award from Dominican University, as an alumna exemplifying a search for truth through charity or service.

== See also ==
- List of Asian American jurists
- List of LGBT jurists in the United States
- List of LGBT state supreme court justices in the United States

Legal offices
Preceded by James Johnson	Justice of the Washington Supreme Court; 2014–2025	Succeeded by Colleen Melody
