= Rita C. Davidson =

American judge

Maryland Court of Appeals Judge
- In office 1978–1984

Personal details
- Born: Rita Charmatz; September 1, 1928 Brooklyn, New York City
- Died: November 11, 1984 (aged 56)
- Education: Goucher College (B.A.); Yale Law School (LL.B.)

Rita C. Davidson (September 1, 1928 – November 11, 1984) was a lawyer and public servant who was the first woman to serve on the Maryland Court of Appeals. Davidson was born in Brooklyn, New York City, the daughter of Lithuanian and Latvian Jewish immigrants by way of Russia. She graduated from Goucher College in 1948 and Yale Law School in 1951.

She worked in private practice in Washington, D.C., and was active in politics in Montgomery County, Maryland. In 1970, Governor Marvin Mandel appointed her as the secretary of Employment and Social Services, the first woman named to a Maryland governor's cabinet.

In 1972, Davidson was appointed to the Maryland Court of Special Appeals. In 1978, acting governor Blair Lee III appointed her to a seat on the Maryland Court of Appeals vacated by the death of Justice Irving A. Levine. Davidson was the first woman appointed to the state's highest court.

Davidson died of cancer on November 11, 1984, at her home in Chevy Chase, Maryland.

== See also ==
- List of female state supreme court justices
