= State v. White =

Washington Supreme Court case

State v. White, 60 Wn.2d 551 (Wash. 1962), was a landmark case before the Washington Supreme Court concerning the insanity defense, capital punishment, and due process rights of defendants in capital cases. The case arose from the prosecution of Don Anthony White, a 22-year-old Black man convicted of two murders in Seattle's Yesler Terrace housing project in 1959.

White’s defense, led by attorneys David W. Weyer and James C. Young, argued that he was legally insane at the time of the killings. The case became one of the first in the United States since the 19th century in which a Black defendant avoided execution through an insanity defense, and it played a nationally recognized role in shaping debate on race, mental health, and the death penalty.

== Background ==
On December 24, 1959, White beat, robbed, and raped Alice Ann Jumper in a laundry room of a Yesler Terrace apartment building, who died from her injuries. Later the same evening, White stabbed longshoreman Willie Dixson to death in his nearby apartment. White was arrested two days later and charged with both murders. White had never met Jumper or Dixson and the murders were spontaneous.

The trial opened in May 1960 in King County Superior Court before Judge Theodore S. Turner. Prosecutors James L. Caplinger and Robert E. Dixon sought the death penalty. Defense attorneys Weyer and Young argued that White was not guilty by reason of mental irresponsibility. The jury convicted White of first-degree murder in the Jumper case and second-degree murder in the Dixson case, recommending execution.

== Washington Supreme Court ruling ==
In September 1961, Weyer and Young appealed to the Washington Supreme Court, challenging the constitutionality of the death penalty. They argued it lacked adequate standards and that White’s mental condition had been insufficiently weighed.

In 1962, the Washington Supreme Court upheld the conviction and sentence, rejecting constitutional challenges. The ruling reaffirmed Washington’s use of the M'Naghten rule to evaluate criminal insanity.

== Federal appeals and clemency efforts ==
In 1964, Weyer and Young sought federal habeas corpus relief, arguing White had been denied due process. The petition was denied, and execution was scheduled.

Governor Albert Rosellini faced mounting pressure over Washington’s use of capital punishment. Civil rights organizations, clergy, and national figures called for clemency in White’s case, citing concerns about racial bias, mental illness, and fairness in capital sentencing.

== Ninth Circuit rulings ==
In 1966, the U.S. Court of Appeals for the Ninth Circuit ruled that White was entitled to a competency hearing, citing doubts about his fitness to stand trial. In 1967, a Ninth Circuit panel affirmed, ordering retrial within 120 days.

== Retrial ==
In 1968, a new jury again convicted White on two counts of murder, but this time imposed two concurrent life sentences rather than the death penalty.

== Media and cultural impact ==
The case received extensive press coverage and was the subject of a Seattle television documentary, A Volcano Named White, produced by Dorothy Bullitt and broadcast without commercial interruption.

Folk musician Bob Dylan later wrote and performed The Ballad of Donald White, inspired in part by the case and the television documentary. The song was first published in Broadside magazine in 1962 under the pseudonym "Blind Boy Grunt."

The case has since been cited in legal scholarship on the insanity defense and capital punishment.
