= Theo Angelis =

American judge (born 1972)

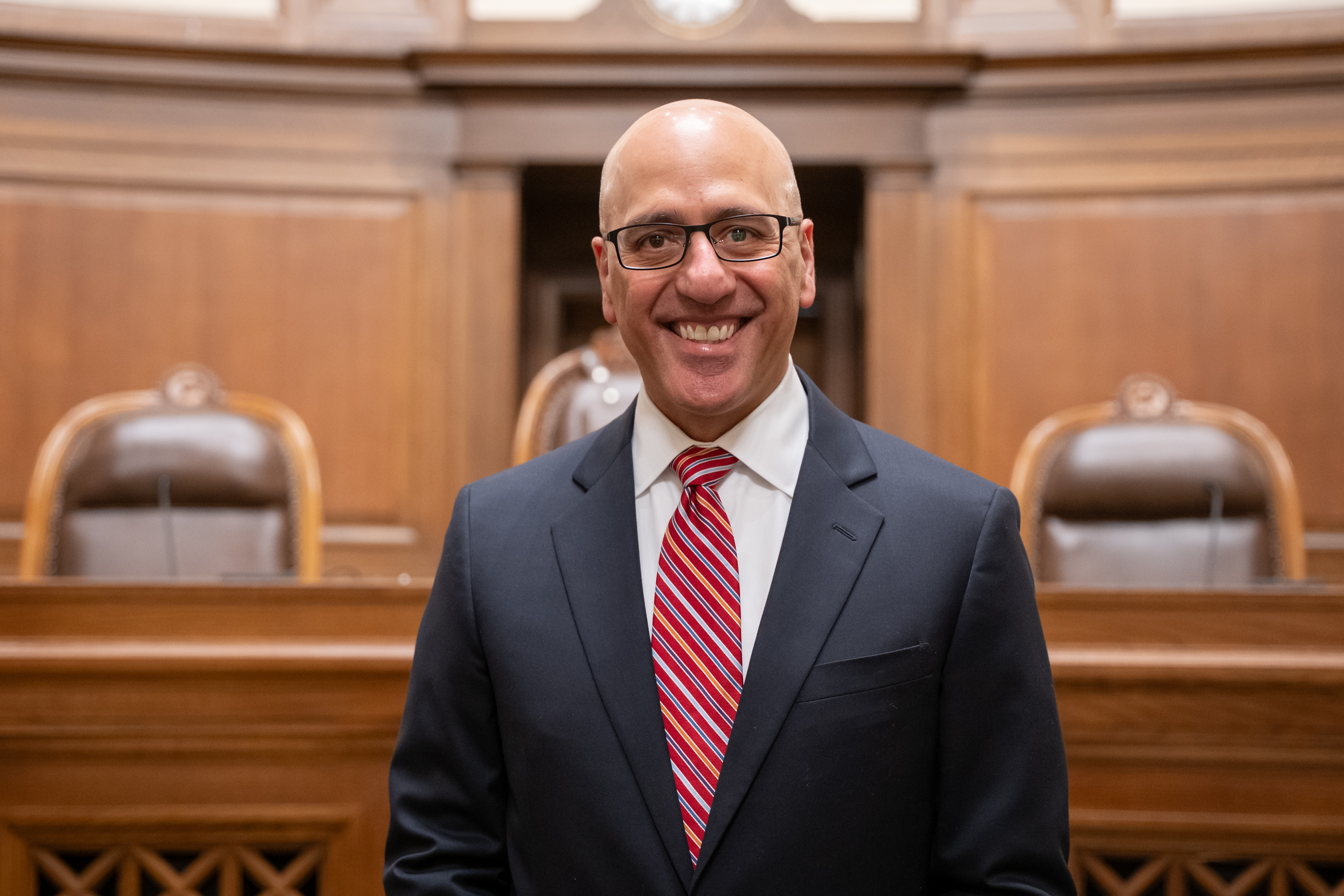

Justice of the Washington Supreme Court
- Incumbent
- Assumed office April 4, 2026
- Appointed by: Bob Ferguson
- Preceded by: Barbara Madsen

Personal details
- Born: Theodore John Angelis; 1972 (age 53–54)
- Education: Claremont McKenna College (BA); London School of Economics (MS); Magdalen College, Oxford (MS); Yale University (JD)

Theodore John Angelis (born 1972) is a justice of the Washington Supreme Court. He is the first person of Middle Eastern descent to serve as a justice on the court. Angelis was appointed by Washington Governor Bob Ferguson and joined the court on April 4, 2026.

== Early life and education ==
Angelis' father immigrated alone from Greece to the United States as a teenager, and his mother's parents were refugees from Turkey. Angelis' father, John became a Greek Orthodox priest, and Theo remains deeply involved in the Greek Orthodox church.

Angelis attended Claremont McKenna College where he graduated summa cum laude with a B.A. in government and psychology in 1994. He won a Marshall Scholarship and attended the London School of Economics for a Master of Science in economics and public policy in 1995 and Magdalen College, Oxford for a Master of Science in comparative social research in 1996. He received his law degree from Yale Law School in 1999, where he was an editor of The Yale Law Journal.

== Career ==
After law school, Angelis served as a law clerk to D.C. Circuit judge Stephen F. Williams. Angelis then joined K&L Gates, a multi-national law firm based in Seattle where Ferguson also worked before being elected to the King County Council. Angelis worked at K&L Gates for 26 years where he focused on intellectual property (IP) law, having argued cases before the International Trade Commission representing companies based in the U.S. and Asia. In that time, he was shortlisted for the 2022 Washington Litigator of the Year award and was recognized as one of the best IP lawyers in the US in several publications.

Angelis has served in various pro bono and advocacy roles receiving several awards for his work. In 2003, he authored a white paper that served as an important founding document for the World Justice Project. He served as the editor of the Washington Lawyers Practice Manual for over a decade. He was a trustee of the King County Bar Association and was named the King County Bar's mentor of the year in 2012. He also served as the president of the Middle Eastern Legal Association of Washington and the Federal Bar Association of the Western District of Washington, also known as the M. Margaret McKeown Bar Association. He was named Citizen of the Year by St. Demetrios Greek Orthodox Church in 2016 for his service to the parish and his legal assistance. He was invested as an Archon of the Ecumenical Patriarchate in 2022 for his research on the legal status of the Patriarchate in international law.

Angelis has done pro bono work on immigrant rights for unaccompanied minors, citing his parent's immigrant experience. In 2011, the Northwest Immigrant Rights Project awarded him their Amicus Award. In 2017, the ACLU awarded his team the Humanitarian Award for their work to ensure children in immigration proceedings were provided with appointed counsel. In 2018, he received the Founders Award from Kids in Need of Defense for his work with their organization representing children in immigration proceedings.

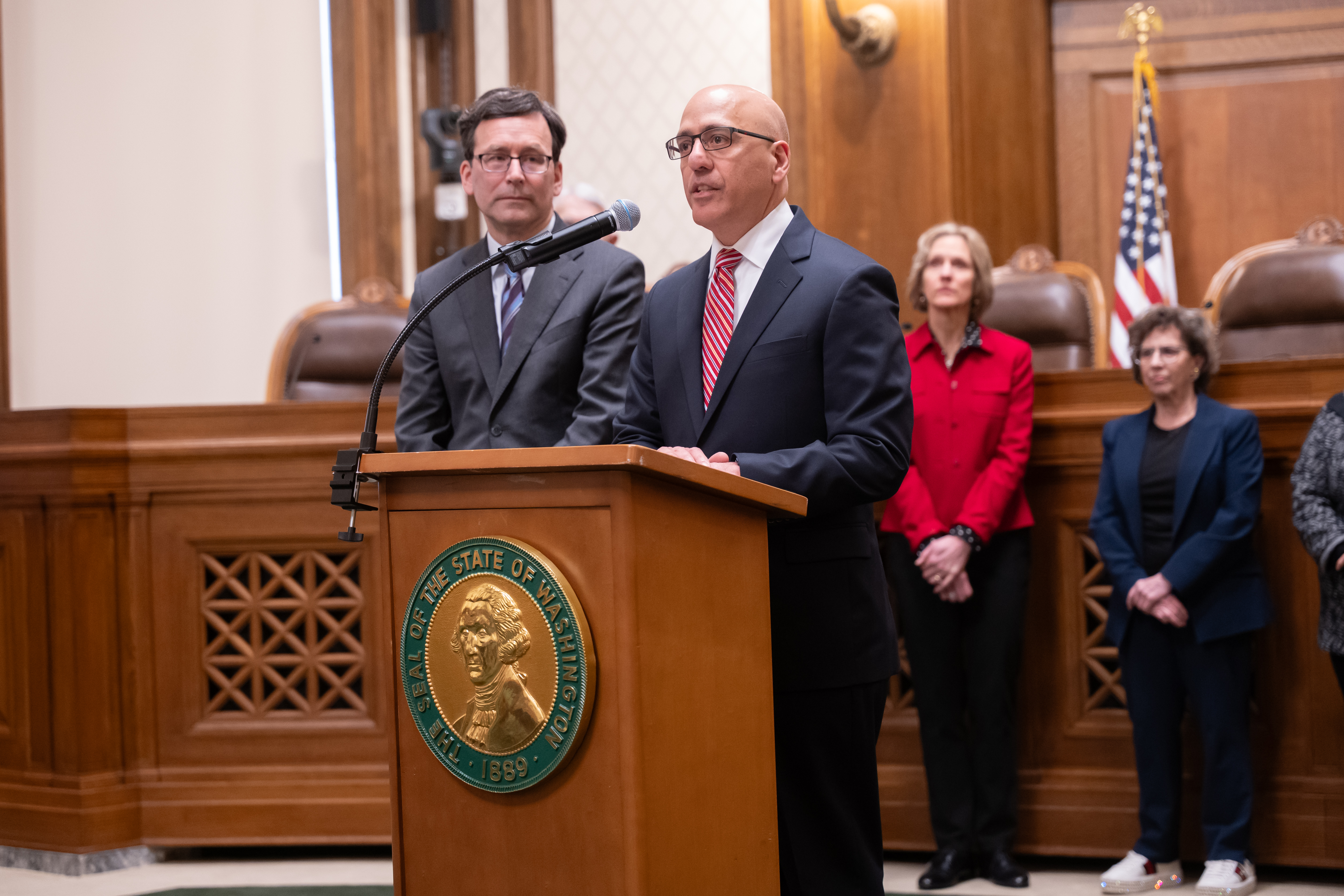
Angelis giving a speech at his appointment ceremony with Bob Ferguson.

=== Appointment to Washington Supreme Court ===
In 2026, associate justice Barbara Madsen announced that she would retire on April 3, 2026. Governor Bob Ferguson appointed Angelis to fill Madsen’s seat through the November 2026 general election, when voters will determine who will serve out the remainder of Madsen’s term which ends in January, 2029. Angelis has not previously served as a judge. Angelis announced his campaign to retain his seat on the court in March, 2026.

Legal offices
Preceded by Barbara Madsen	Justice of the Washington Supreme Court; 2026–present	Incumbent
