= Barbara Durham =

American judge

Chief Justice of the Washington Supreme Court
- In office 1995–1998

Justice of the Washington Supreme Court
- In office 1985–1998
- Appointed by: John Spellman

Judge of the Washington Court of Appeals
- In office January 4, 1980 – January 14, 1985
- Appointed by: Dixy Lee Ray

Judge of the King County Superior Court
- In office 1977–1980

Personal details
- Born: October 6, 1942 Anacortes, Washington, U.S.
- Died: December 30, 2002 (aged 60) Seattle, Washington, U.S.
- Education: Georgetown University (BA); Stanford University (JD)

Barbara M. Durham (October 6, 1942 – December 30, 2002) was the first-ever female chief justice of the Washington Supreme Court. She also was a former federal judicial nominee to the United States Court of Appeals for the Ninth Circuit.

== Early life and education ==
Born in Anacortes, Washington, Durham graduated with a bachelor's degree in finance from Georgetown University. After working for one year at Merrill Lynch, Durham attended Stanford Law School, where she earned a law degree in 1968.

== Professional career ==
Durham began her legal career as a deputy prosecuting attorney in King County, Washington. She later went into private practice.

== Washington state judicial service ==
Durham first became a judge in 1973 when she was appointed to the Mercer Island District Court, a part-time job. She was elected a judge on the King County Superior Court in 1977. In 1980, Washington Governor Dixy Lee Ray appointed Durham to the Washington Court of Appeals. In 1985, Governor John Spellman appointed her to the Washington Supreme Court, to a seat vacated by Carolyn Dimmick, who had resigned to accept an appointment to the United States District Court. Durham was chosen as Chief Justice by her peers in 1995. Durham stepped down as chief justice in 1998.

"I have a personal bias in favor of judges working their way up through the judicial system, so that when one gets to the higher court, one is familiar with the system, bottom to top," Durham once said. Durham was Washington's first judge to ever serve at all four levels of the state's courts.

== Nomination to the Ninth Circuit and withdrawal ==
In January 1999, President Bill Clinton nominated Durham to a seat on the U.S. Court of Appeals for the Ninth Circuit that had been vacated by Judge Betty Binns Fletcher taking senior status. The conservative Durham's nomination by a Democratic president was part of a deal brokered between the White House and Washington's senators at the time, Slade Gorton and Patty Murray. Gorton, a Republican, had insisted on Clinton nominating Durham—a conservative judge—to the Ninth Circuit in exchange for clearing the way for Clinton's nominations of three liberals: Ronald M. Gould, Margaret McKeown and William Fletcher. "This is a very happy day for me," Durham said at the time.

In late May 1999, however, Durham abruptly withdrew her name from consideration, citing her husband's heart problems. The seat later was filled by Clinton's appointment of Seattle lawyer Richard Tallman, a Republican recommended by Gorton.

== Resignation ==
On September 15, 1999, Durham resigned from the Washington Supreme Court more than three years before the end of her term, declining to give any specifics. Durham had had repeated unexplained absences from the court in the months prior to her resignation, and she gave no explanation for them in her resignation letter. Durham had, however, been recovering from eye surgery during the court's spring 1999 term. "The last few years, especially while serving as chief justice, have been taxing and frequently stressful," she wrote in her resignation to Washington Gov. Gary Locke. "Now is the time to take a fresh look at the future." She also told Locke that she was planning to "pursue some other interests related to the law."

After Durham's death, however, it came out that she had been suffering from a variety of medical problems, including early-onset Alzheimer's disease, which were the cause of her absences in her final year on the state supreme court. Durham had applied for and been granted a medical disability retirement. "I don't know how to put this delicately...Things were becoming more difficult for her than they once were," said former state Supreme Court Justice Robert Utter in an article in The Seattle Times. "She had a special kind of courage."

== Death ==
A resident of Oak Harbor, Washington, Durham died in Mount Vernon, Washington on December 30, 2002, of kidney failure, a complication from the early-onset Alzheimer's disease that she had been suffering from. Durham was survived by her physician husband, Charles Divelbiss, who after her death set up the Barbara Durham Memorial Fund for Research in Neurodegenerative Diseases.
