= Colleen Melody =

American judge (born 1981 or 1982)

Justice of the Washington Supreme Court
- Incumbent
- Assumed office January 1, 2026
- Appointed by: Bob Ferguson
- Preceded by: Mary Yu

Personal details
- Born: 1982 (age 43–44) Spokane, Washington, U.S.
- Education: University of Washington (BA, JD)

Colleen M. Melody (born 1982) is a justice of the Washington Supreme Court. Melody was appointed by Governor Bob Ferguson and joined the court on January 1, 2026.

== Early life and education ==
Melody is a native of Spokane, Washington. She received her undergraduate and law degrees from the University of Washington and graduated first in her law school class.

== Career ==
After law school, Melody served as a law clerk to Ninth Circuit judge Ronald M. Gould. Melody began her legal career at the U.S. Department of Justice Civil Rights Division, then returned to Washington to lead the state Attorney General’s Wing Luke Civil Rights Division. As an Assistant Attorney General, Melody helped lead Washington's successful challenge to Executive Order 13769, President Donald Trump's first “Muslim ban."

=== Appointment to Washington Supreme Court ===

In 2025, associate justice Mary Yu announced that she would retire at the end of that year. Governor Bob Ferguson appointed Melody to fill Yu's seat through the November 2026 general election, in which voters elected Melody to serve out the remainder of Yu’s term. Melody had not previously served as a judge.

Legal offices
Preceded by Mary Yu	Justice of the Washington Supreme Court; 2026–present	Incumbent
