= Sean O'Donnell (judge) =

American judge

- O'Donnell in 2026

Justice of the Washington Supreme Court
- Elect
- Assuming office January 11, 2027
- Succeeding: Charles Johnson

Personal details
- Born: Sean Patrick O'Donnell; 1971 or 1972 (age 54–55)
- Education: Georgetown University (BA); Seattle University (JD)

Sean Patrick O'Donnell (born 1971/1972) is an American judge. He is a justice-elect of the Washington Supreme Court.

Legal offices
Preceded by Charles Johnson	Justice of the Washington Supreme Court; Taking office 2027	Elect
