= Jaime Hawk =

American judge

Justice of the Washington Supreme Court
- Elect
- Assuming office January 11, 2027
- Succeeding: Raquel Montoya-Lewis

Personal details
- Born: 1977 (age 48–49)
- Education: Gonzaga University (BA, JD)

Jaime Michelle Hawk (born 1977) is an American lawyer and judge. A current King County Superior Court judge, she is a justice-elect of the Washington Supreme Court.

== Biography ==
Jaime Michelle Hawk was born in 1977, and went to high school in Boise. She studied at Gonzaga University, where she obtained a BA cum laude in political science and women’s studies in 1999. She was then an advocate for victims and survivors of domestic violence and sexual assault. She received her JD cum laude from the Gonzaga School of Law in 2004. She then worked as a Senate Judiciary Committee attorney-fellow for Senator Ted Kennedy and served a Yakima-based federal judge as a law clerk.

Hawk became a public defender on both the federal and state levels and later was an attorney with the American Civil Liberties Union of Washington. She has served as an adjunct law professor.

In 2022, Hawk was appointed King County Superior Court judge by governor Jay Inslee. Hawk was re-elected to the court in 2023 and 2024.

With incumbent Raquel Montoya-Lewis not seeking election, Hawk ran in the 2026 Washington Supreme Court election for Position 3, facing fellow superior court judge David Stevens. She defeated Stevens 57.8% to 41.8%.

Legal offices
Preceded by Raquel Montoya-Lewis	Justice of the Washington Supreme Court; Taking office 2027	Elect
