= Mary Fairhurst =

American judge (1957–2021)

Chief Justice of the Washington Supreme Court
- In office January 9, 2017 – January 5, 2020
- Preceded by: Barbara Madsen
- Succeeded by: Debra L. Stephens

Associate Justice of the Washington Supreme Court
- In office January 13, 2003 – January 5, 2020
- Preceded by: Charles Z. Smith
- Succeeded by: Raquel Montoya-Lewis

Personal details
- Born: Mary Elizabeth Fairhurst; August 13, 1957 Pendleton, Oregon, U.S.
- Died: December 28, 2021 (aged 64) Olympia, Washington, U.S.
- Party: Democratic
- Domestic partner: Bob Douglas
- Education: Gonzaga University (BA, JD)

Mary Elizabeth Fairhurst (August 13, 1957 — December 28, 2021) was an American attorney and jurist who served as a justice and chief justice of the Washington Supreme Court.

== Early life and education ==
A native of Olympia, Washington, Fairhurst earned her undergraduate degree in political science from Gonzaga University in 1979, graduating cum laude. In 1984, she earned her Juris Doctor from Gonzaga University School of Law, graduating magna cum laude.

== Career ==
Fairhurst served in the Attorney General of Washington's office under Christine Gregoire and Ken Eikenberry. Fairhurst worked on a constitutional amendment to increase the rights of crime victims. She also organized statewide conferences on domestic violence.

Fairhurt joined the Washington Supreme Court after a successful election in 2003. In 2008, she won re-election against Michael J. Bond. On November 4, 2016, it was announced that Fairhurst had been elected Chief Justice of the Washington State Supreme Court.

Fairhurst served as the president of the Washington State Bar Association. She also served on the Bar Board of Governors representing Washington's 3rd congressional district and as the President of the Washington Women Lawyers.

In October 2018, Fairhurst wrote the majority opinion on a ruling to abolish state's death penalty. In 2019, Fairhurst received the American Inns of Court Professionalism Award for the Ninth Circuit at the Judicial Conference of the Ninth Circuit in Spokane, Washington.

== Retirement and death ==
In October 2019, Fairhurst announced that she would retire from the court in January 2020, citing health concerns. On December 4, 2019, Governor Jay Inslee nominated Raquel Montoya-Lewis to succeed Fairhurst. Montoya-Lewis is the first Native American to serve on the Washington Supreme Court.

In 2020, Fairhurst received the Charles A. Goldmark Distinguished Service Award. On August 22, 2020, Fairhurst became the seventh Lynn Allen Award recipient.

Fairhurst died from cancer in Olympia, Washington, on December 28, 2021, at the age of 64. She had been treated for colon cancer starting in 2008.

== See also ==
- List of female state supreme court justices

Legal offices
Preceded by Charles Z. Smith	Justice of the Washington Supreme Court; 2003–2020	Succeeded by Raquel Montoya-Lewis
Preceded by Barbara Madsen	Chief Justice of the Washington Supreme Court; 2017–2020	Succeeded by Debra L. Stephens
