= J. Michael Diaz =

American lawyer (born 1974)

Mike Diaz

Judge of the Washington Court of Appeals
- Incumbent
- Assumed office September 2022
- Appointed by: Jay Inslee
- Preceded by: Jim Verellen

Personal details
- Born: November 15, 1974 (age 51) Lima, Peru
- Education: University of Notre Dame (BA); Princeton University (attended); Cornell University (JD)

J. Michael "Mike" Diaz is an American lawyer who has served as a judge of Washington Court of Appeals since 2022. He served as a judge of the King County Superior Court from 2018 to 2022.

== Early life and education ==
Diaz immigrated from Peru to Seattle as an infant. His family settled eventually in the then-working-class neighborhood of Ballard and, in middle school, moved down to the White Center/Burien area. His family spoke Spanish exclusively at home. He was the first lawyer in his large Latino family.

Diaz received his Bachelor of Arts in philosophy, magna cum laude, from the University of Notre Dame in 1996. He then was a graduate student at Princeton University, studying classical philosophy for two years. Diaz received his Juris Doctor from Cornell Law School in 2002, where he was a member of the Cornell International Law Journal.

== Career ==
From 2002 to 2006, Diaz was an associate in the Houston office of the international law firm of Fulbright & Jaworski LLP, litigating complex commercial and white-collar criminal matters. Diaz then returned home and joined the litigation boutique Yarmuth Wilsdon Calfo, litigating the same types of cases.

Diaz was an assistant United States attorney of the United States Attorney's Office for the Western District of Washington from 2008 to 2018, where he founded the office’s Civil Rights Program in 2011.

Diaz was on faculty regularly between 2012 and 2017 at the DOJ's National Advocacy (Training) Center, lecturing on civil rights enforcement. Additionally, in 2016, Diaz lectured on the Rule of Law as part of the DOJ and State Department’s Office of Oversees Prosecutorial Training and Development in East Timor.

=== Expired nomination to district court ===
In 2016 President Obama nominated Diaz to be a United States district judge for the United States District Court for the Western District of Washington. The American Bar Association unanimously rated Diaz "Qualified" for the nomination. The nomination expired at the end of the 114th Congress without Senate action.

=== State judicial service ===
Governor Jay Inslee appointed Diaz to succeed Richard McDermott on the King County Superior Court in December 2017, effective January 22, 2018.

As a judge, Diaz presided over approximately four dozen trials in all types of criminal, civil and domestic matters.

Governor Inslee appointed Diaz to Division I of the Washington Court of Appeals, effective September 2022. He replaced Judge Jim Verellen, who retired.

== Community involvement ==
As an attorney, Diaz regularly volunteered at the King County Bar Association's Neighborhood Legal Clinic Program's Spanish Language Legal Clinic, which he later helped merge with the El Centro de La Raza clinic. He served on KCBA's Pro Bono Service Committee, was chair of its Neighborhood Legal Clinic Program's advisory committee, and chair of its Spanish Clinic Subcommittee.

Diaz is on faculty at the DOJ’s National Advocacy Center, the Washington State Judicial Institute, and the Washington State Judicial College. He is currently the chairperson of the Washington State Supreme Court’s Interpreter Commission. For many years Diaz has helped coach/manage his daughters' school soccer team.
