= Gerry L. Alexander =

American judge

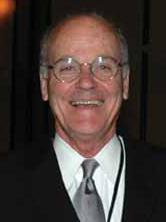
- Alexander in 2006

Chief Justice of the Washington Supreme Court
- In office 2004–2010

Justice of the Washington Supreme Court
- In office 1995 – December 2011

Personal details
- Born: April 28, 1936 (age 88); Aberdeen, Washington, U.S.
- Education: Olympia High School; University of Washington (BA); University of Washington School of Law (JD)

Gerry L. Alexander (/ˈɡɛri/ GHERR-ee; born April 28, 1936) is the former Chief Justice of the Supreme Court of the U.S. state of Washington. He was elected to the court in 1994 and re-elected in 2000. Following this election, his colleagues elected him to a four-year term as chief justice. He was re-elected as chief justice in 2004 and re-elected to the court in 2006. Due to the court's age limit of 75, Alexander was unable to complete his final six-year term. He stepped down as Chief Justice at the beginning of 2010 and retired from the Court in December 2011.

== Early life and education ==
Alexander was born in 1936 in Aberdeen, Washington. He attended Olympia High School in Olympia, Washington, and graduated from the University of Washington with a BA in History in 1958. While a student at UW, he was a member of the Gamma Chi Chapter of the Sigma Nu fraternity. In 1964, Alexander received his JD from the University of Washington Law School.
