= Sheryl Gordon McCloud =

American judge (born 1955)

Justice of the Washington Supreme Court
- Incumbent
- Assumed office January 9, 2013
- Preceded by: Tom Chambers

Personal details
- Born: Sheryl Gordon; October 5, 1955 (age 69); New York City, U.S.
- Spouse: Mike McCloud
- Children: 2
- Education: State University of New York, Buffalo (BA); University of Southern California (JD)

Sheryl Gordon McCloud (born October 5, 1955) is an American lawyer who has served as a justice of the Washington Supreme Court since 2013. She was elected to replace outgoing Associate Justice Tom Chambers on Seat 9 of the Washington Supreme Court, winning 55.24% of the vote and defeating former Associate Justice Richard B. Sanders. When she took the bench in 2013, it gave the Washington Supreme Court a female majority.

McCloud is a 1976 graduate of the University at Buffalo and a 1984 graduate of the USC Gould School of Law. While in law school, she served as an editor of the Southern California Law Review.

In February 2017, Justice McCloud authored the unanimous court's opinion in the Arlene's Flowers lawsuit, finding that the First Amendment to the United States Constitution gave the florist no right to refuse to provide services for a gay wedding, writing "this case is no more about the access to flowers than civil rights cases were about access to sandwiches."

In September 2017, McCloud dissented when, by a vote of 5–3, the court upheld the child pornography trafficking conviction of a seventeen-year-old boy for sexting a picture of himself to an adult woman.

In October 2018, McCloud joined the majority when the court abolished the state's death penalty because they found its racist imposition violated the Constitution of Washington.

In February 2021, McCloud authored the 5-4 majority opinion in State v. Blake, which ruled that the statute criminalizing simple possession of controlled substances was unconstitutional. The statute did not require prosecutors to prove someone knowingly possessed drugs, and McCloud argued that criminalizing passive, unknowing conduct is unconstitutional.

Legal offices
Preceded by Tom Chambers	Justice of the Washington Supreme Court; 2013–present	Incumbent
