= William L. Downing =

American lawyer

William Lansing Downing (born August 1, 1949) is a former judge of the Superior Court of Washington for King County (Seattle) and a former prosecutor. He retired following 28 years of distinguished service as a judge on the King County Superior Court bench. He is recognized for his landmark ruling legalizing same-sex marriage in Washington.

Before embarking on a career in law, Downing graduated from Vassar College, worked in a psychiatric hospital as a conscientious objector during the Vietnam War, and made a living working on fishing boats in Bellingham, Washington. While at Vassar, he met his wife, Laura; after graduating, the two moved to Seattle where they raised their son.

After earning a Doctor of Jurisprudence degree from the University of Washington School of Law in 1978, he served as a prosecutor in King County for 11 years. During his tenure, he successfully prosecuted the individuals responsible for the 1983 Wah Mee massacre.
