= Raquel Montoya-Lewis =

American judge (born 1968)

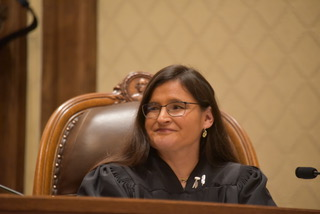

Justice of the Washington Supreme Court
- Incumbent
- Assumed office January 6, 2020
- Appointed by: Jay Inslee
- Preceded by: Mary Fairhurst
- Succeeded by: Jaime Hawk (elect)

Personal details
- Born: Raquel Devahl Montoya; April 3, 1968 (age 58) Spain
- Party: Democratic
- Education: University of New Mexico (BA); University of Washington (MSW, JD)

Raquel Devahl Montoya-Lewis (born April 3, 1968) is an American attorney and jurist serving as an associate justice of the Washington Supreme Court. She was nominated by Governor Jay Inslee on December 4, 2019, to fill the seat of retiring justice Mary Fairhurst.

== Early life and education ==
Montoya-Lewis was born in Spain, where her father was stationed in the United States Air Force. Raised in New Mexico, she is a member of the Pueblo of Isleta and descended from the Pueblo of Laguna. Montoya-Lewis and her mother, who was born in Australia, are Jewish.

Montoya-Lewis earned a Bachelor of Arts degree from the University of New Mexico, a Master of Social Work degree from the University of Washington, and Juris Doctor from the University of Washington School of Law.

== Career ==
Montoya-Lewis was a professor at Fairhaven College of Western Washington University in Bellingham, Washington. From 2008 to 2011 she was chief judge of the Lummi Nation. She also served as chief judge for the Upper Skagit Indian Tribe and the Nooksack Indian Tribe, and served as a trial and appellate judge for numerous tribes around the country. She served on the Whatcom County Superior Court from 2015 to 2020, after being appointed to that seat by Governor Inslee in December 2014; she retained her seat through two elections in 2015 and 2016 She assumed office on the Washington Supreme Court on January 6, 2020. She is the second Native American person to sit on a state supreme court and the first enrolled tribal member.

On November 3, 2020, she was elected for a six-year term, after running against Federal Way municipal court judge Dave Larson, and winning 58 percent of the vote, to his 41 percent.

Montoya-Lewis announced in early 2026 that she would not seek reelection, but she would serve the remainder of her term that is set to end December 31, 2026. Her statements indicated intentions to mentor law students, judges, and lawyers.

== See also ==
- List of Native American jurists
- List of first women lawyers and judges in Washington

Legal offices
Preceded by Mary Fairhurst	Justice of the Washington Supreme Court; 2020–present	Succeeded by Jaime Hawk; Elect
