= Bobbe Bridge =

American judge

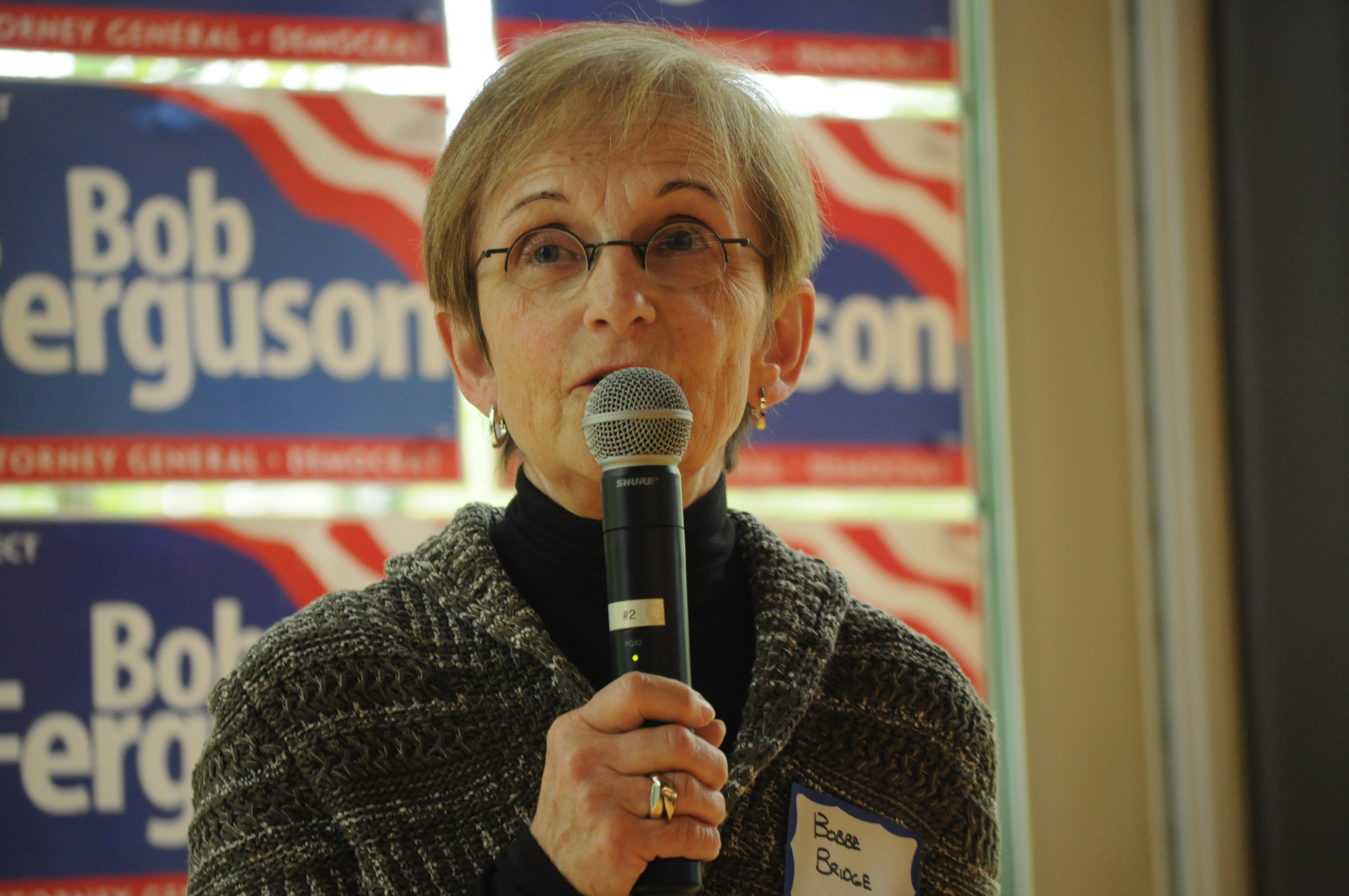
Bobbe Bridge, 2011

Bobbe Jean Bridge (born 1944) is an American former judge who served as Associate Justice of the Washington Supreme Court. After serving 10 years as a King County Superior Court Judge, she was appointed to the Washington State Supreme Court by Governor Gary Locke in 1999. She was elected in 2000 and again in 2002. She resigned her judgeship in 2007.

On February 23, 2003, Justice Bridge was arrested for hit and run and for drunk driving after she hit a parked car near her home and attempted to flee the scene, while intoxicated. Her blood alcohol level tested at .219 and .227.

She retired from the Supreme Court at the end of 2007 to assume the role of Founding President/CEO of the Seattle-based Center for Children & Youth Justice, a private not-for-profit agency advocating juvenile justice, child welfare and related systems reform. Washington Governor Christine Gregoire appointed Debra L. Stephens to replace her in January 2008.

Bridge retired from the Center for Children & Youth Justice in 2019. Since then, she has served on public boards and advisory committees, including the National Advisory Committee on the Sex Trafficking of Children and Youth in the United States.

Bridge received the Advocacy Spirit Award from National Network for Youth in January 2010 for "relentlessly defending the rights and dignity of homeless children in our country." In 2019, she was awarded the Crosscut Courage Award for "a lifetime advocating for youth".
