= Superior Court of Washington for King County =

Largest trial court in Washington State

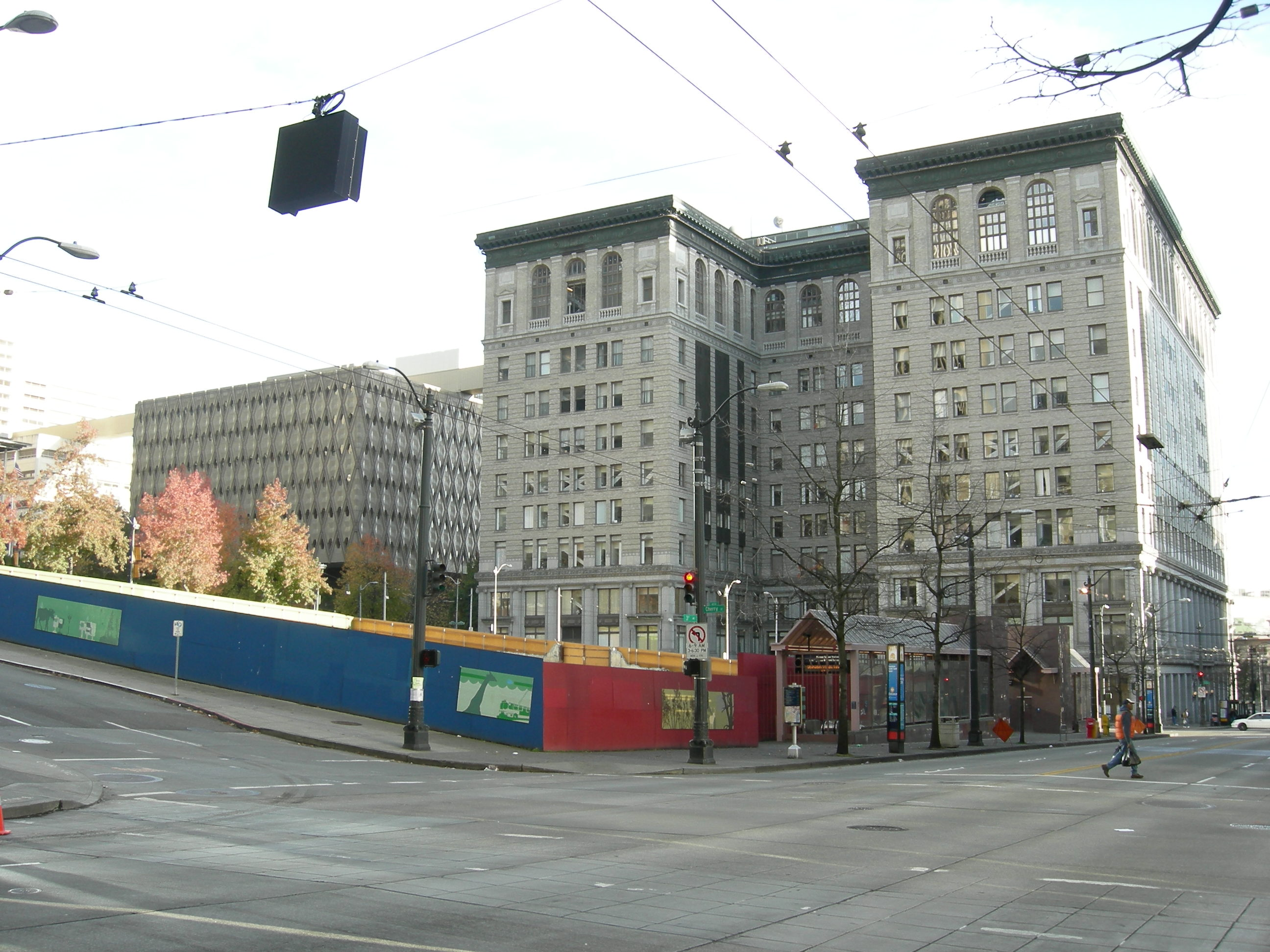
- King County Courthouse, Seattle
- Interactive map of Superior Court of Washington for King County
- Established: 1889
- Jurisdiction: Washington; King County
- Location: King County
- Composition method: Non-partisan election
- Authorised by: Constitution of Washington
- Appeals to: Washington Court of Appeals
- Appeals from: King County District Court
- Number of positions: 56 judges
- Website: kingcounty.gov/courts/superior-court.aspx

Presiding Judge (King County Courthouse)
- Currently: Averil Rothrock

Chief Judge (Maleng Regional Justice Center)
- Currently: Josephine Wiggs-Martin

Chief Judge (Clark Children and Family Justice Center)
- Currently: Veronica Galván

The Superior Court of Washington for King County (informally known as the King County Superior Court) is a state court in Washington state, United States. It is based at the King County Courthouse, 516 Third Avenue, in downtown Seattle, Washington. It also operates a juvenile facility and a Regional Justice Center in Kent, southeast of Seattle.

As of July 2026, the court has 56 judges who have general jurisdiction to hear major civil and criminal cases. The court also has appellate jurisdiction over certain decisions of the district courts, municipal courts, and administrative tribunals.

== Current judges ==
	Name	Assumed office	Current term end	Appointed by	Law school
Judges
Presiding Judge	Averil Rothrock	October 28, 2018	January 9, 2029	Jay Inslee (D)	Willamette University
Assistant Presiding Judge	Tanya Thorp	April 1, 2014	January 9, 2029	Jay Inslee (D)	Seattle University
Chief Judge of the Maleng Regional Justice Center, Kent	Josephine Wiggs-Martin	April 15, 2019	January 9, 2029	Jay Inslee (D)	University of Washington
Chief Judge of the Clark Children and Family Justice Center, Seattle	Veronica Galván	December 19, 2014	January 9, 2029	Jay Inslee (D)	University of Washington
Chief Civil Judge	David Keenan	January 9, 2017	January 9, 2029	Elected	Seattle University
Chief Criminal Judge	Brian McDonald	September 2019	January 9, 2029	Jay Inslee (D)	University of Michigan
Assistant Chief Criminal Judge	Nelson K.H. Lee	February 18, 2020	January 9, 2029	Jay Inslee (D)	Pepperdine University
Chief Unified Family Court Judge	Aimee Sutton	February 10, 2019	January 9, 2029	Elected	University of Washington
Lead Judge, Dependency	Adrienne McCoy	October 1, 2021	January 9, 2029	Jay Inslee (D)	University of Washington
Judge	Kristin Ballinger	December 22, 2021	January 9, 2029	Jay Inslee (D)	Columbia University
Judge	Johanna Bender	November 2, 2015	January 9, 2029	Jay Inslee (D)	University of Washington
Judge	Elizabeth J. Berns	January 2013	January 9, 2029	Elected	Seattle University
Judge	Joe Campagna	August 17, 2022	January 9, 2029	Jay Inslee (D)	Vermont Law School
Judge	Monica Cary	March 18, 2024	January 9, 2029	Jay Inslee (D)	Lewis & Clark College
Judge	Samuel Chung	May 27, 2014	January 9, 2029	Jay Inslee (D)	George Washington University
Judge	Paul M. Crisalli	September 1, 2023	January 9, 2029	Jay Inslee (D)	University of Oregon
Judge	William L. Dixon V	July 1, 2023	January 9, 2029	Jay Inslee (D)	University of Washington
Judge	Marshall Ferguson	July 29, 2018	January 9, 2029	Jay Inslee (D)	University of Washington
Judge	Taki V. Flevaris	February 9, 2023	January 9, 2029	Jay Inslee (D)	Harvard Law School
Judge	Jaime Hawk	January 26, 2023	January 9, 2029	Jay Inslee (D)	Gonzaga University
Judge	Nikole E. Hecklinger	January 13, 2025	January 9, 2029	Elected	Seattle University
Judge	Janet Helson	March 11, 2015	January 9, 2029	Jay Inslee (D)	University of California, Berkeley
Judge	Jason Holloway	February 18, 2022	January 9, 2029	Jay Inslee (D)	Willamette University
Judge	Angela Kaake	March 20, 2024	January 9, 2029	Jay Inslee (D)	Seattle University
Judge	Mark Larrañaga	May 15, 2023	January 9, 2029	Jay Inslee (D)	Gonzaga University
Judge	Matt Lapin	April 30, 2022	January 9, 2029	Jay Inslee (D)	University of Miami
Judge	Kent Liu	June 30, 2025	January 9, 2029	Bob Ferguson (D)	Seattle University
Judge	Susan LLorens	January 24, 2025	January 9, 2029	Jay Inslee (D)	University of Washington
Judge	Hillary Madsen	January 11, 2021	January 9, 2029	Elected	Seattle University
Judge	Jessica Murphy Manca	July 1, 2026	January 9, 2029	Bob Ferguson (D)	University of Washington
Judge	John McHale	January 9, 2017	January 9, 2029	Elected	Seattle University
Judge	Maureen McKee	August 23, 2018	January 9, 2029	Jay Inslee (D)	Cornell Law School
Judge	Sean O'Donnell	January 2013	January 9, 2029	Elected	Seattle University
Judge	Patrick Oishi	January 2011	January 9, 2029	Christine Gregoire (D)	Seattle University
Judge	Suzanne Parisien	January 10, 2013	January 9, 2029	Elected	Villanova University
Judge	Jennifer Petersen	February 10, 2025	January 9, 2029	Jay Inslee (D)	University of Washington
Judge	Nicole Gaines Phelps	January 9, 2017	January 9, 2029	Elected	Indiana University
Judge	Cindi Port	April 1, 2020	January 9, 2029	Jay Inslee (D)	Gonzaga University
Judge	Jason Poydras	July 8, 2021	January 9, 2029	Jay Inslee (D)	Seattle University
Judge	E. Rania Rampersad	August 14, 2023	January 9, 2029	Jay Inslee (D)	Georgetown University
Judge	Andrea Robertson	December 31, 2020	January 9, 2029	Jay Inslee (D)	University of Washington
Judge	Michael K. Ryan	January 10, 2019	January 9, 2029	Jay Inslee (D)	Georgetown University
Judge	Tenaya Scheinman	May 1, 2026	January 9, 2029	Bob Ferguson (D)	University of Virginia
Judge	Benjamin Santos	April 30, 2025	January 9, 2029	Bob Ferguson (D)	American University
Judge	Ken Schubert	January 14, 2013	January 9, 2029	Elected	University of Washington
Judge	Michael Scott	April 2, 2018	January 9, 2029	Jay Inslee (D)	Stanford Law School
Judge	Ketu Shah	May 10, 2019	January 9, 2029	Jay Inslee (D)	University of Minnesota
Judge	Nicholas Straley	March 4, 2024	January 9, 2029	Jay Inslee (D)	Cornell Law School
Judge	Todd D. Tinker	February 18, 2025	January 9, 2029	Jay Inslee (D)	Seattle University
Judge	Haydee Vargas	March 21, 2022	January 9, 2029	Jay Inslee (D)	Seattle University
Judge	David Whedbee	September 16, 2019	January 9, 2029	Jay Inslee (D)	University of Washington
Judge	Sandra Widlan	April 2, 2018	January 9, 2029	Jay Inslee (D)	New York University
Judge	Coreen Wilson	December 16, 2022	January 9, 2029	Jay Inslee (D)	University of Washington
Judge	Wyman Yip	January 9, 2023	January 9, 2029	Jay Inslee (D)	Lewis & Clark College
Judge	Daniel York	January 8, 2026	January 9, 2029	Bob Ferguson (D)	University of Houston
Judge	Melinda Young	January 2, 2019	January 9, 2029	Jay Inslee (D)	University of Washington
Court Commissioners
Commissioner	Paul F. Eagle	June 18, 2018	-	Appointed by Court	Gonzaga University
Commissioner	Heritage Filer	March 18, 2025	-	Appointed by Court	Seattle University
Commissioner	Kate Francis	August 2, 2024	-	Appointed by Court	Seattle University
Commissioner	Kate Francis	August 2, 2024	-	Appointed by Court	Seattle University
Commissioner	Lindsey Goheen	2023	-	Appointed by Court	Seattle University
Commissioner	Mark J. Hillman	July 2018	-	Appointed by Court	Seattle University
Commissioner	Hollis Holman	August 6, 1996	-	Appointed by Court	Gonzaga University
Commissioner	Henry Judson	July 2014	-	Appointed by Court	Lewis & Clark College
Commissioner	Jonathon Lack	June 17, 2019	-	Appointed by Court	University of Richmond School of Law
Commissioner	Sarah L. Moen	March 31, 2026	-	Appointed by Court	Whittier Law School
Commissioner	Heather Muwero	2024	-	Appointed by Court	Seattle University
Commissioner	Javier Ortiz	March 24, 2025	-	Appointed by Court	Seattle University
Commissioner	Jamie Perry	2022	-	Appointed by Court	Seattle University
Commissioner	Camille Schaefer	2018	-	Appointed by Court	Seattle University

== Notable judges ==
- Walter B. Beals
- Adam Beeler
- John H. Chun
- William L. Downing
- Barbara Durham
- Matthew W. Hill
- Faith Ireland
- Richard A. Jones
- Robert S. Lasnik
- Gary Little
- Ricardo S. Martinez
- Marsha Pechman
- John S. Robinson
- Stanley C. Soderland
- James Street
- Mary Yu
