= James M. Johnson (judge) =

American judge

Associate Justice, Washington Supreme Court
- In office 2005–2014
- Preceded by: Faith Ireland
- Succeeded by: Mary Yu

Personal details
- Education: Harvard University; University of Washington

James Martin Johnson is a former Associate Justice of the Washington Supreme Court. He was first elected to the court in 2004. Johnson graduated from Harvard University with a B.A. in economics and obtained his J.D. from the University of Washington. From 1973 to 1993, Johnson worked in the Washington Attorney General's office, during which time he served as Assistant Attorney General responsible for the Fish and Wildlife Division. Johnson served as Washington's first Counsel for the Environment, in this role he led the state's effort to hold hydro and nuclear power generation projects to high environmental and safety standards.

Justice Johnson came under political fire after a Supreme Court employee issued a press release critical of Justice Sanders. During a discussion of budget cuts to various court committees, a court employee argued against cutting a court committee dealing with race and alleged that institutional racism in the courts was the sole reason for the statistically greater rate of incarceration amongst blacks in Washington State. Justice Sanders argued that socio-economic forces were responsible and that Washington's Court System was not racist, but instead "...represents convictions for crimes committed rather than railroading innocent men to prison...". Justice Johnson appeared to agree with Justice Sanders' position.

== Notes ==
Legal offices
| Preceded by Faith Ireland | Associate Justice, Washington Supreme Court; 2005–2014 | Succeeded by Mary Yu |
