= Charles W. Johnson (jurist) =

American judge (born 1951)

Charles Johnson

Justice of the Washington Supreme Court
- Incumbent
- Assumed office January 1, 1991
- Preceded by: Keith M. Callow
- Succeeded by: Sean O'Donnell (elect)

Personal details
- Born: Charles William Johnson; March 16, 1951 (age 75) Tacoma, Washington, U.S.
- Education: University of Washington (BA); Seattle University (JD)

Charles William Johnson (born March 16, 1951) is an American lawyer who has served as a justice of the Washington Supreme Court since 1991.

== Education ==
Johnson graduated from the University of Puget Sound School of Law (now Seattle University School of Law) in 1976, and was the first graduate of that institution to be elected to the Washington Supreme Court. He took his undergraduate degree from the University of Washington in 1974. He is a graduate of Curtis High School in University Place, Washington. He taught State Constitutional Law at Seattle University from 1995 through 2010.

== Tenure on the court ==
Johnson has served on the Washington Supreme Court longer than any other Justice. In September 2023, Johnson surpassed Mark A. Fullerton to become the longest-serving Supreme Court Justice in Washington state history. He was first elected to the Washington Supreme Court in 1990, gaining re-election in 1996, 2002, and 2008. He was re-elected again in 2014 and 2020 and is currently serving his sixth term, which will run until 2027.

In October 2018, Johnson wrote a concurrence when the majority abolished the state's death penalty because they found its racially biased imposition violated the Constitution of Washington. Justice Johnson also wrote Hansen v. Friend, 118 Wn.2d 476 (1992). This case established an adult who gave a child alcohol could be liable for accidents caused in result of the child's intoxication. Two years later, he wrote State v. Young, 123 Wn.2d 173 (1994). This case establishes that the government needs a warrant before conducting thermal imaging of a person's home. In 1999, he wrote CJC v. Corporation of the Catholic Bishop of Yakima, 138 Wn.2d 699 (1999). This case holds a church has a duty of reasonable care to act to prevent foreseeable harm to children.

Justice Johnson co-charged the Washington State Minority and Justice Commission from 1994 to 2018.

== Personal life ==
He was born in Tacoma, Washington, and resides in Gig Harbor, Washington.

Legal offices
Preceded by Keith M. Callow	Justice of the Washington Supreme Court; 1991–present	Succeeded by Sean O'Donnell; Elect
