= Debra L. Stephens =

American judge (born 1965)

Debra Stephens

Chief Justice of the Washington Supreme Court
- Incumbent
- Assumed office January 13, 2025
- Preceded by: Steven González
- In office January 5, 2020 – January 11, 2021
- Preceded by: Mary Fairhurst
- Succeeded by: Steven González

Justice of the Washington Supreme Court
- Incumbent
- Assumed office January 1, 2008
- Appointed by: Christine Gregoire
- Preceded by: Bobbe Bridge

Personal details
- Born: Debra Leigh Williams; 1965 (age 59–60); Spokane, Washington, U.S.
- Spouse: Craig Stephens (m. 1989)
- Children: 2
- Education: Gonzaga University (BA, JD)

Debra Leigh Stephens (née Williams; born 1965) is an American lawyer who has served as the chief justice of the Washington Supreme Court since 2025. She previously served as chief justice from 2020 to 2021. She was appointed to the court in December 2007 by Governor Christine Gregoire and took office on January 1, 2008. She was elected by voters in 2008 and re-elected in 2014 and 2020. Prior to her appointment, Stephens served as a judge for Division Three of the Washington Court of Appeals and as an adjunct professor at Gonzaga University School of Law. She is the first judge from Division Three of the Court of Appeals to serve on the Washington State Supreme Court, and the first woman from Eastern Washington to do so.

== Biography ==
=== Early life and education ===
Debra Leigh Williams grew up in Spokane, Washington. She graduated from West Valley High School, where she was student body president and a national "Century III Leader." In 2012, she was inducted into its alumni Hall of Fame. She graduated from Gonzaga University and taught speech communication and coached the debate team at Spokane Falls Community College before entering Gonzaga University School of Law as a Thomas More Scholar. She earned her J.D. degree with honors, graduating summa cum laude in 1993.

=== Career ===
After completing law school, Stephens served as a staff attorney for the Honorable Frederick L. Van Sickle, United States District Court for the Eastern District of Washington from 1993 to 1995. Stephens then went into private practice. From 1995 until April 2007 she helped coordinate the Amicus Curiae Program of the Washington State Trial Lawyers Association Foundation. She also taught federal and state constitutional law, community property, appellate advocacy, and legal research and writing as an adjunct professor for Gonzaga University School of Law.

In 2007, she was appointed and then elected as a judge for Division Three of the Washington Court of Appeals. Judge Stephens was then appointed to the Washington State Supreme Court effective January 1, 2008. She was then elected in 2008 to the Washington Supreme Court and re-elected in 2014.

In October 2018, Stephens concurred when the majority abolished the state's death penalty because they found its racist imposition violated the Constitution of Washington.

On November 6, 2019, Stephens was unanimously selected to be the next Chief Justice of the Washington Supreme Court, following the retirement of Mary Fairhurst.

Stephens was re-elected as an associate justice in 2020 unopposed. She was succeeded as Chief Justice by Steven González on January 11, 2021.

=== Marriage and children ===
Stephens and her husband, Craig, have been married since 1989, and have two children.

Legal offices
Preceded by Bobbe Bridge	Justice of the Washington Supreme Court; 2008–present	Incumbent
Preceded by Mary Fairhurst	Chief Justice of the Washington Supreme Court; 2020–2021	Succeeded by Steven González
Preceded by Steven González	Chief Justice of the Washington Supreme Court; 2025–present	Incumbent
