= Washington Supreme Court =

Highest court in the U.S. state of Washington

Coordinates: 47°02′13″N 122°54′18″W

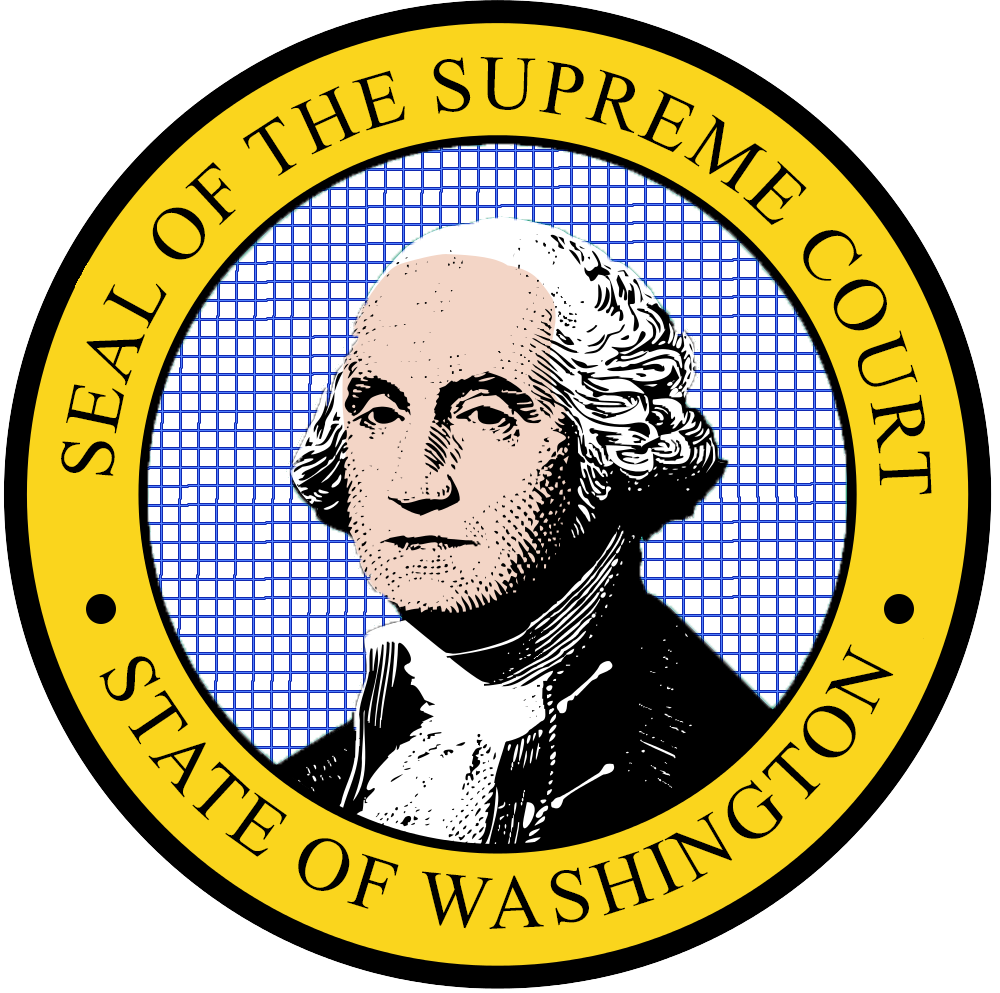
- Interactive map of Washington Supreme Court
- Established: November 9, 1889
- Location: Olympia, Washington, United States
- Composition method: Non-partisan election
- Authorised by: Washington State Constitution
- Appeals to: Supreme Court of the United States
- Judge term length: 6 years
- Number of positions: 9
- Website: Official website

Chief Justice
- Currently: Debra L. Stephens
- Since: January 13, 2025
- Lead position ends: January 8, 2029

Associate Chief Justice
- Currently: Charles W. Johnson

The Washington Supreme Court is the highest court in the state judiciary of the U.S. state of Washington. The court is composed of a chief justice and eight associate justices. Members of the court are elected to six-year terms. Justices must retire at the end of the calendar year in which they reach the age of 75, per the Washington State Constitution.

The chief justice is chosen by secret ballot by the Justices to serve a 4-year term. The current chief justice is Debra L. Stephens, who began her term in January 2025. She previously served as Chief Justice from 2019-2020, serving out the remainder of Chief Justice Mary Fairhurst's term when she retired.

Prior to January 1997 (pursuant to a Constitutional amendment adopted in 1995), the post of chief justice was held for a 2-year term by a justice who (i) was one of the Justices with 2 years left in their term, (ii) was the most senior in years of service of that cohort, and (iii) (generally) had not previously served as chief justice. The last chief justice under the rotation system, Barbara Durham, was the architect of the present internal election system and was the first to be elected under the new procedure, serving until her resignation in 1999.

The court convenes in the Temple of Justice, a historic building on the Washington State Capitol campus in Olympia, Washington.

The persuasiveness of the court's decisions reaches far beyond Washington's borders. A Supreme Court of California study published in 2007 found that the Washington Supreme Court's decisions were the second most widely followed by the appellate courts of all other U.S. states in the period from 1940 to 2005 (second only to California).

== Selection ==
Members of the court are elected to six-year terms, with three justices elected in each even-numbered year in a nonpartisan election with a top-two primary. Judicial elections in Washington, including for the Supreme Court, are frequently uncontested and incumbents typically win reelection. The last time a justice lost reelection was in 2010 when Charles K. Wiggins defeated Richard B. Sanders, who had previously defeated Rosselle Pekelis in 1995. When chief justice Keith M. Callow lost to Charles W. Johnson in 1990, it was the first time in 40 years an incumbent had lost.

The only required qualification for justices is that they are admitted to practice law in Washington.

In case of a vacancy, the Governor of Washington may appoint a replacement who must stand in the next election to fill the unexpired term. Five of the current nine judges were originally appointed.

== Current justices ==
Seat	Name	Born	Start	Chief term	Term ends	Mandatory retirement (Note: Justices must retire by the end of the calendar year (December 31) in which they attain the age of 75.)	Appointer	Law school
7	Debra L. Stephens, Chief Justice	1965 (age 60–61)	January 1, 2008	2025–present 2020–2021	2032	2040	Christine Gregoire (D)	Gonzaga
4	Charles W. Johnson, Associate Chief Justice	March 16, 1951 (age 75)	January 14, 1991	–	2026	2026	—N/a (Note: Took office after being elected in a nonpartisan election.)	Seattle
8	Steven González	October 1, 1963 (age 63)	January 1, 2012	2021–2025	2030	2038	Christine Gregoire (D)	UC Berkeley
9	Sheryl Gordon McCloud	October 5, 1955 (age 71)	January 9, 2013	–	2030	2030	—N/a	USC
3	Raquel Montoya-Lewis	April 3, 1968 (age 58)	January 6, 2020	–	2026	2043	Jay Inslee (D)	UW
6	Helen Whitener	1964 (age 61–62)	April 24, 2020	–	2028	2039	Jay Inslee (D)	Seattle
2	Sal Mungia	February 19, 1959 (age 67)	January 13, 2025	–	2030	2034	—N/a	Georgetown
1	Colleen Melody	1982 (age 43–44)	January 1, 2026	–	2028	2057	Bob Ferguson (D)	UW
5	Theo Angelis	1972 (age 53–54)	April 4, 2026	–	2028	2047	Bob Ferguson (D)	Yale

=== Elected justices ===
Vacator	Reason	Start	Successor
Charles W. Johnson	Term Expired	January 11, 2027	Sean O'Donnell
Raquel Montoya-Lewis	Term Expired	January 11, 2027	Jaime Hawk

== History ==
The early history of the Washington Supreme Court has been described as follows:

The constitution fixed the terms of supreme court judges at six years, and provided that the first judges should determine by lot, two to serve for three years, two for five years, and one for seven years. This was to prevent a too sweeping change of the court at any one time. The judge with the shortest term to serve is elected by the court as chief justice, which allows most of the judges to enjoy that honor in turn. Judge Dunbar is the only one who has served continuously through the life of this court. There are a few irregularities in the length of the terms. Judge Gordon resigned in June, 1900. Governor Rogers appointed William H. White to take his place. In November of the same year Judge White was regularly elected, but the term ended the following January. The Legislature in 1901 provided for the appointment of two judges to serve only until October, 1902. Governor Rogers appointed to these positions William H. White and Hiram E. Hadley. In 1905, the Legislature permanently increased the court from five to seven. Governor Mead appointed Herman D. Crow and Milo A. Root. At the next election, in 1906, those two judges were regularly elected for the terms expiring in 1909. After his election in November, 1908, Judge Root resigned.

Candidates for election were originally nominated at party conventions, but in 1907 it became a direct nonpartisan election.

Carolyn R. Dimmick was the first woman to sit on the court, taking her seat in 1981. Barbara Durham was the first female chief justice, selected in 1995. Charles Z. Smith, appointed 1988, was the first African American to serve on the court. Mary Yu became the first LGBT, Asian American, and Latina member in 2014. A majority of justices have been female since 2013. After the appointment of Helen Whitener in 2020, the court was called "arguably the most diverse court, state or federal, in American history", with various incumbents reflecting the state's white, black, Hispanic, Asian American, Native American, LGBT, immigrant, Jewish, and disabled populations.

== Notable cases ==
- Harland v. Washington (1887) – The territorial supreme court declared women's suffrage unconstitutional in a 2-1 decision.
- State v. White (1962) – Upheld the death penalty in the conviction of Don Anthony White for homicide.
- State v. Gunwall (1986) – The court established a test for when it would turn to the State constitution, rather than the federal one, to resolve a constitutional question.
- McCleary v. Washington (2012) – The state of Washington failed to meet its Constitutional duty to adequately fund education.
- State v. Gregory (2018) – Unanimously decided the death penalty in Washington violated the state constitution, as applied.
- State v. Blake (2021) – Declared in a 5–4 ruling that the statute criminalizing simple possession of controlled substances was unconstitutional.
- Quinn v. Washington Department of Revenue (2021) — The state's tax on capital gains is constitutional.

== Gallery ==
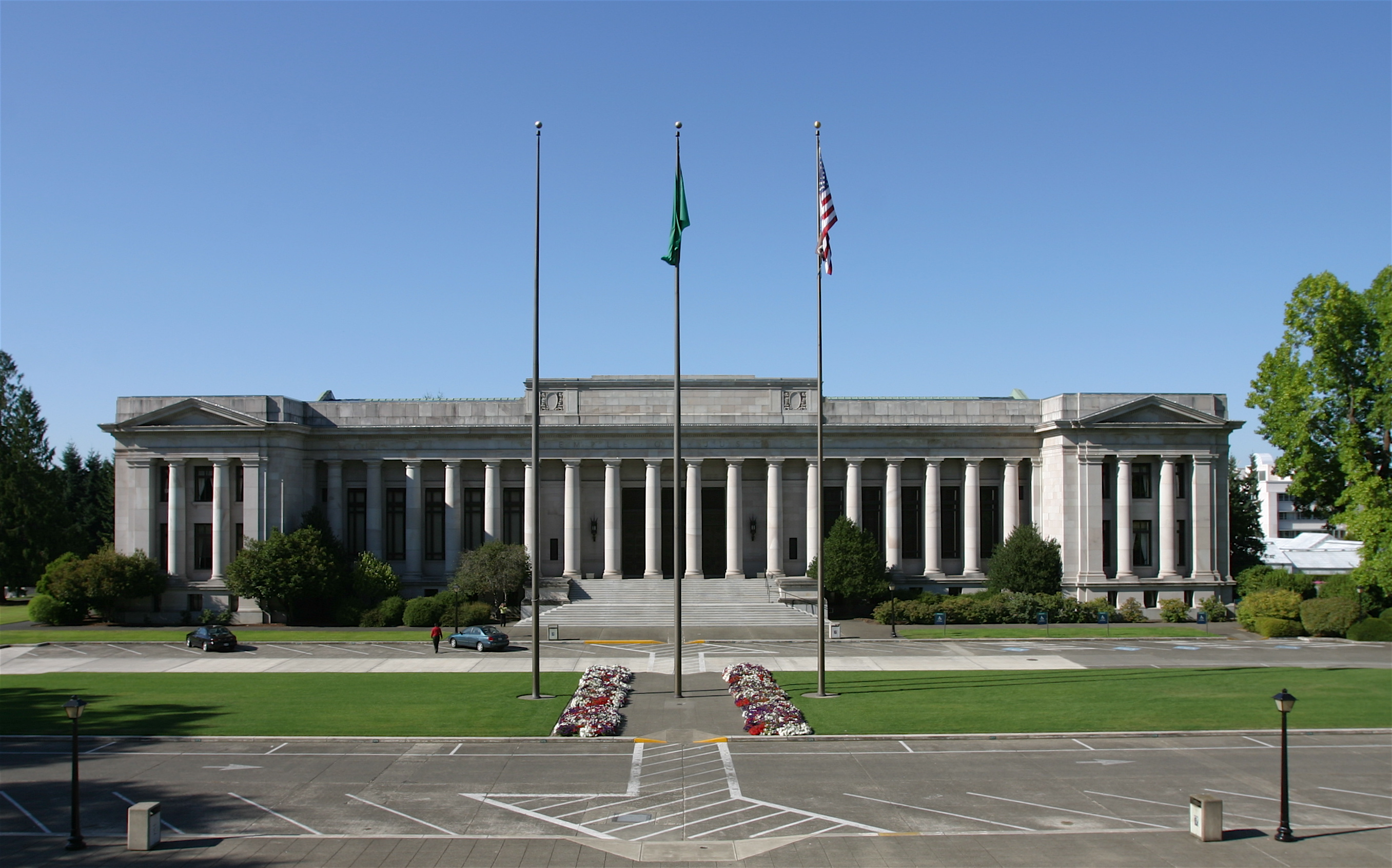
The court meets in the Temple of Justice in Olympia

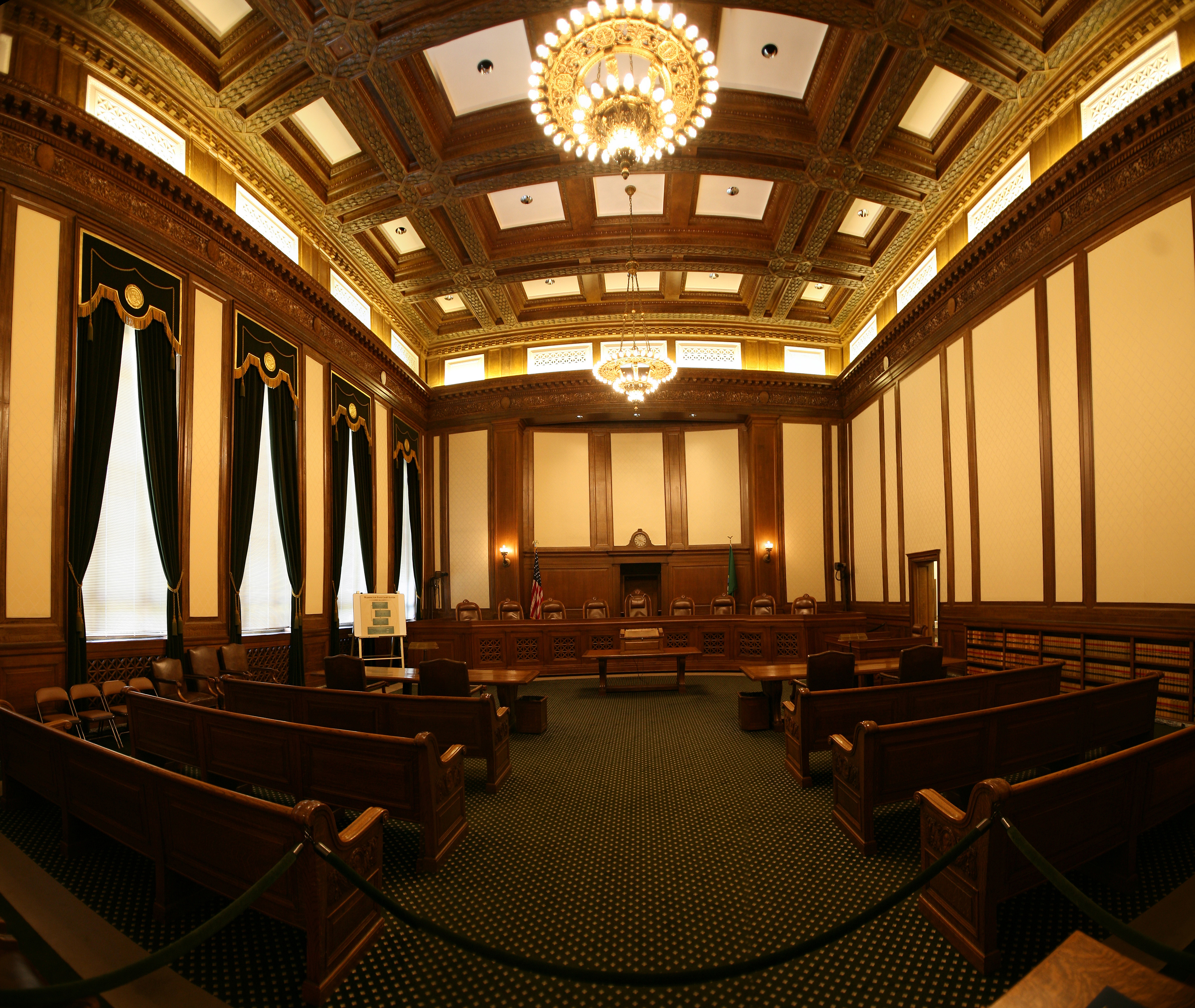
The interior of the Washington State Supreme Court

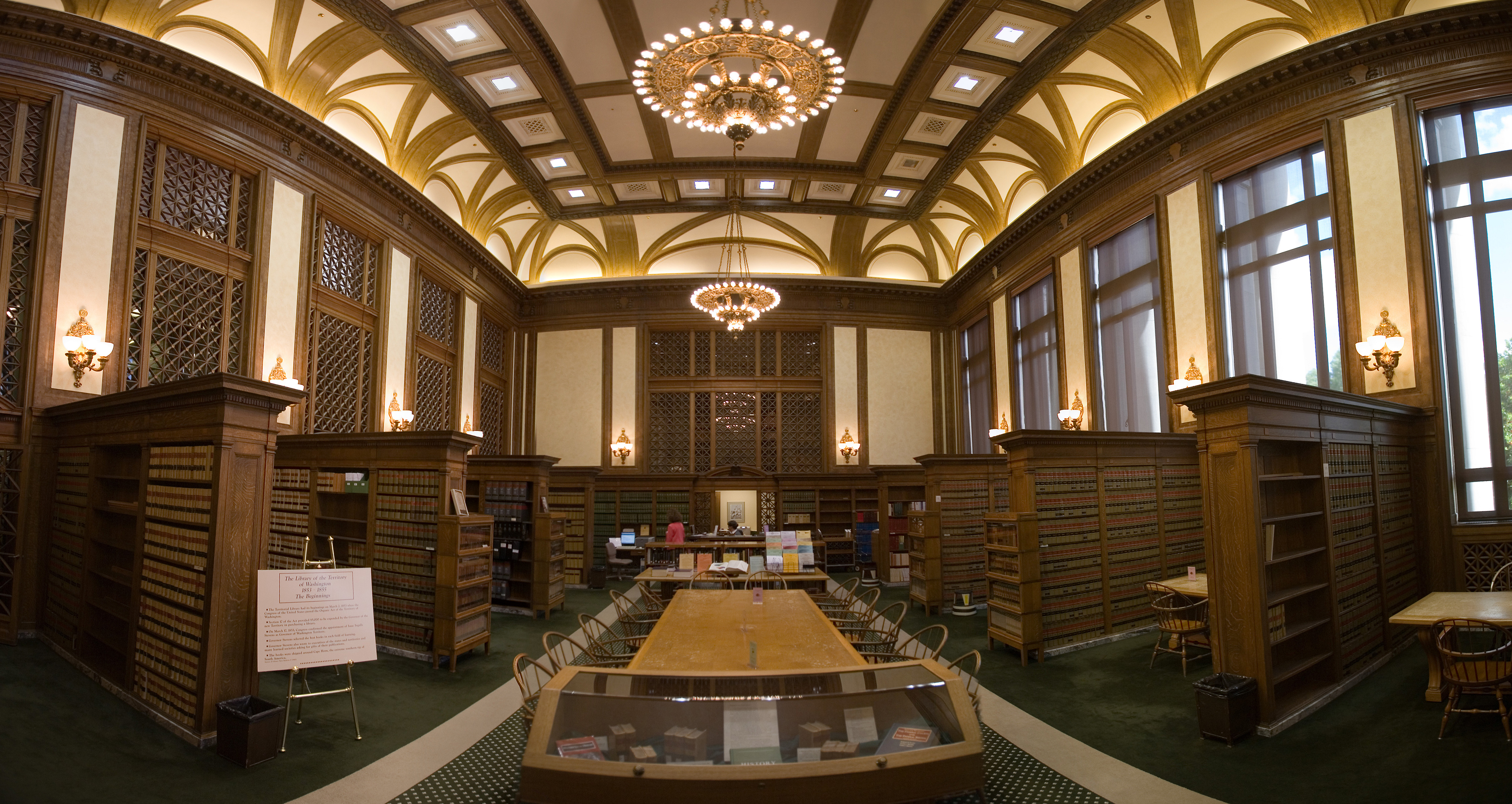
Inside the Law Library

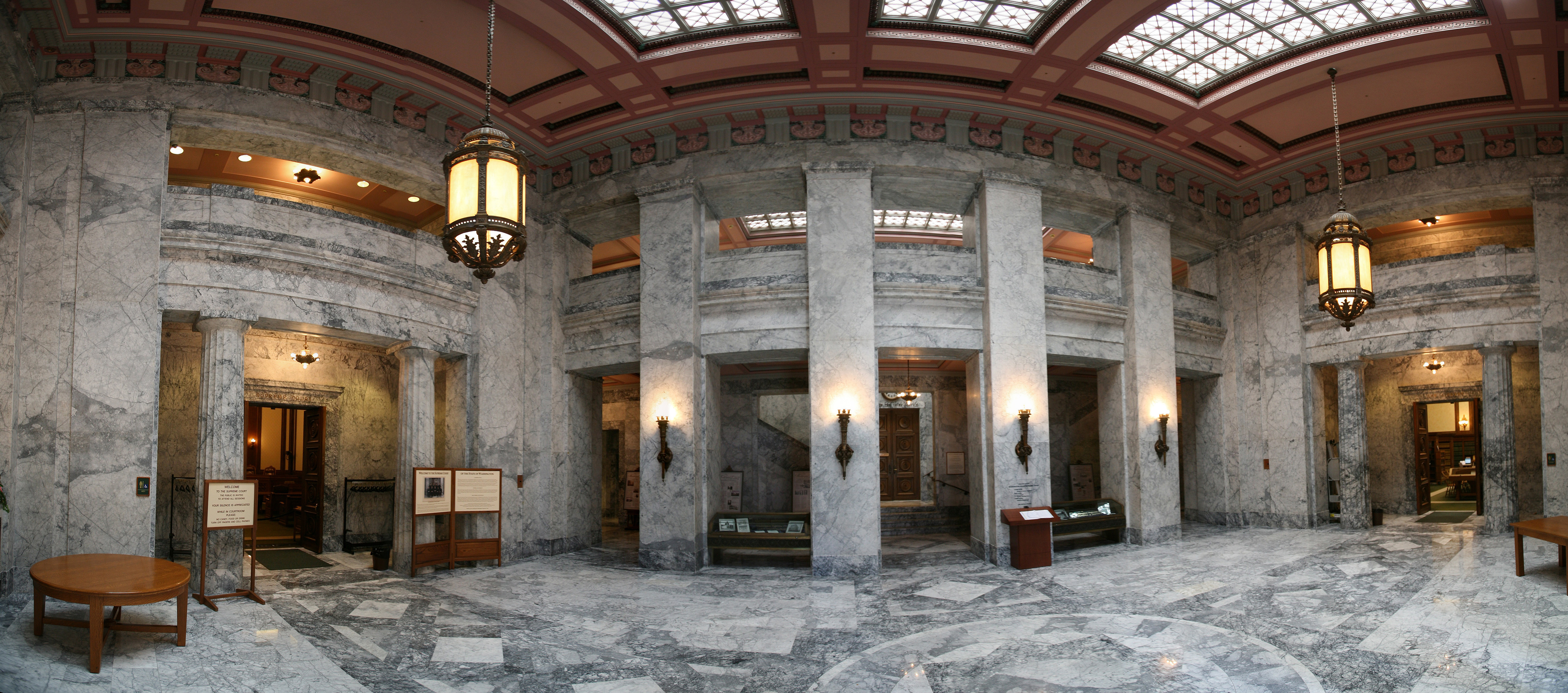
The foyer of the Temple of Justice building
