= Institutional racism in the United States =

Societal factor

California Governor Gavin Newsom speaking about institutional racism in 2020

Within the United States, institutional racism includes policies and practices which are enforced to marginalize minority ethnic and racial groups, particularly Black and Hispanic Americans. Institutional racism against such groups has historically manifested in American systems of criminal justice, health care, immigration policy, education, and other matters.

== In housing and lending ==
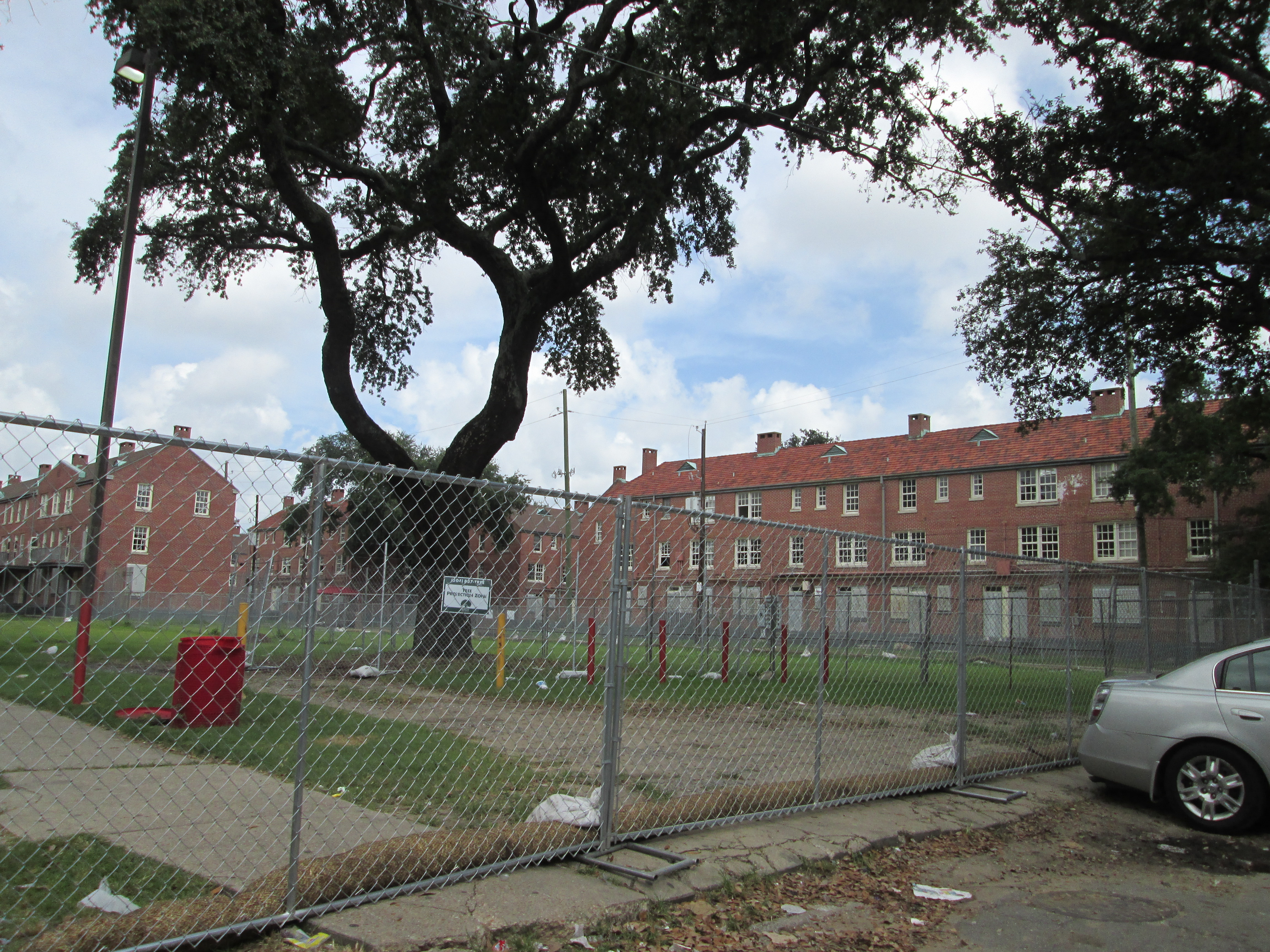
Iberville Housing Projects in New Orleans, Louisiana

Institutional racism in the housing sector could be seen as early as the 1930s with the Home Owners' Loan Corporation. Banks would determine a neighborhood's risk for loan default and redline neighborhoods that were at high risk of crime. These neighborhoods tended to be African-American neighborhoods, whereas whites were able to receive housing loans. Over several decades, as whites left the city to move to nicer houses in the suburbs, predominantly African-American neighborhoods fell apart. Retail stores also started moving to the suburbs to be closer to the customers and to avoid being robbed. Commencing with President Franklin D. Roosevelt's New Deal in the 1930s and through the 1960s, the FHA contributed to the economic growth of the white population by providing loan guarantees to banks, which in turn financed white homeownership and enabled white flight, and it did not make loans available to black people. As minorities were not able to get financing and aid from banks, whites pulled ahead in equity gains. Moreover, many college students were then, in turn, financed with the equity in homeownership that was gained by having gotten the earlier government handout, which was not the same accorded to black and other minority families. The institutional racism of the FHA's 1943 model has been tempered after the Great Recession by President Barack Obama's efforts to stabilize the housing losses of 2008 with his Fair Housing Finance (GSE) reform.

These changes, which were brought on by government-funded programs and projects, have led to a significant change in inner-city markets. Due to robberies, black neighborhoods have been left with fewer food stores, but more liquor stores. The low-income neighborhoods are left with independently owned smaller grocery stores that tend to have higher prices. Poor consumers are left with the option of traveling to middle-income neighborhoods, or spending more for less.

The racial segregation and disparities in wealth between European Americans and African-American people include legacies of historical policies. In the Social Security Act of 1935, agricultural workers and servants, who disproportionately were black, were excluded because key whites did not want governmental assistance to change the agrarian system. In the Wagner Act of 1935, "blacks were blocked by law from challenging the barriers to entry into the newly protected labor unions and securing the right to collective bargaining." In the National Housing Act of 1939, the property appraisal system tied property value and eligibility for government loans to race. The 1936 Underwriting Manual used by the Federal Housing Administration to guide residential mortgages gave 20% weight to a neighborhood's protection, for example, zoning ordinances, deed restrictions and high-speed traffic arteries, from adverse influences, such as infiltration of inharmonious racial groups. Thus, white-majority neighborhoods received the government's highest property value ratings, and whites were eligible for government loans and aid. Richard Rothstein, in his book "The Color of Law," tells of a history of residential segregation in America. He noted that government institutions in all branches and at all levels and were complicit in excluding African Americans from home-ownership. "We have created a caste system in this country, with African Americans kept exploited and geographically separate by racially explicit government policies," he wrote. In covering topics like racial covenants – where loans to developers were contingent on contracts that spelled out specific exclusion of black people, he showed that it was a policy spelled out by the Federal Housing Administration's underwriting manual, which denied any guarantees for a federal bank loan to a developer if they were to sell properties to African Americans in white communities. Homeowners in one such subdivision, Levittown, Long Island, New York, were forbidden to rent or sell to persons "other than members of the Caucasian race". Between 1934 and 1962, less than two percent of government-subsidized housing went to non-white people.

In 1968, the Fair Housing Act (FHA) was signed into law to eliminate the effects of state-sanctioned racial segregation. But it failed to change the status quo as the United States remained nearly segregated as in the 1960s. A newer discriminating lending practice was the subprime lending in the 1990s. Lenders targeted high-interest subprime loans to low-income and minority neighborhoods who might be eligible for fair-interest prime loans. Securitization, mortgage brokers and other non-deposit lenders, and legislative deregulation of the mortgage lending industry all played a role in promoting the subprime lending market.

Numerous audit studies conducted in the 1980s in the United States found consistent evidence of discrimination against African Americans and Hispanics in metropolitan housing markets.

The long-outlawed practice of redlining (in which banks choke off lending to minority communities) recently re-emerged as a concern for federal bank regulators in New York and Connecticut. A settlement with the Justice Department and the Consumer Financial Protection Bureau was the largest in the history of both agencies, topping $33 million in restitution for the practice from New Jersey's largest savings bank. The bank had been accused of steering clear of higher crime neighborhoods and favoring whites in granting loans and mortgages, finding that, of the approximately 1,900 mortgages made in 2014, only 25 went to black applicants. The banks' executives denied bias, and the settlement came with adjustments to the banks' business practices. This followed other successful efforts by the federal, state and city officials in 2014 to expand lending programs directed at minorities, and in some cases to force banks to pay penalties for patterns of redlining in Providence, Rhode Island; St. Louis, Missouri; Milwaukee, Wisconsin; and Buffalo and Rochester, New York. The Justice Department also has more active redlining investigations underway, and officials have stated to reporters that "redlining is not a thing of the past". It has evolved, they explained, into a more politically correct version, where bankers do not talk openly about denying loans to black people. The Justice Department officials noted that some banks quietly had institutionalized bias in their operations. They have moved their operations out of minority communities entirely, while others have moved in to fill the void and compete for clients. Such management decisions are not the stated intent, it is left unspoken so that even the bank's other customers are unaware that it is occurring. The effect on minority communities can be profound as home ownership, a prime source of neighborhood stability and economic mobility can affect its vulnerability to blight and disrepair. In the 1960s and 1970s, laws were passed banning the practice; its return is far less overt, and while the vast majority of banks operate legally, the practice appears to be more widespread as the investigation revealed a vast disparity in loans approved for black people as compared to whites in similar situations.

Studies in major cities, such as Los Angeles and Baltimore, show that communities of color have lower levels of access to parks and green space. Parks are considered an environmental amenity and have social, economic, and health benefits. The public spaces allow for social interactions, increase the likelihood of daily exercise in the community and improve mental health. They can also reduce the urban heat island effect, provide wildlife habitat, control floods, and reduce certain air pollutants. Minority groups have less access to decision-making processes that determine the distribution of parks. A recent study published by Suffolk University found that black renters face discrimination when renting compared to similarly situated white renters.

In 1999, a class action suit (Pigford v. Glickman) was settled between tens of thousands of African-American farmers and USDA for racial discrimination in allocation of farm loans and assistance from 1981 to 1996. In 2010, Congress appropriated $1.2 billion for additional claims up to 2008.

== Racism in health care and environmental racism ==
Institutional racism impacts health care accessibility within non-white minority communities by creating health disparities among racial groups. For example, from 1865 to 1906, many black veterans were unfairly denied disability pension by the Union Army disability pension system. Racism may also account for disproportionate rates of diseases, such as AIDS, among ethnic minorities. In a 1992 article, Janis Hutchinson argues that the federal government has responded slowly to the AIDS epidemic in minority communities and that their attempts have been insensitive to ethnic diversity in preventive medicine, community health maintenance, and AIDS treatment services. In addition, the mass incarceration of black males along, with vectors for addiction in co-relation to the higher number of minority females found infected with the HIV virus after 2000, has been the subject of study, and findings have shown that previous analyses of the rise incorrectly attributed it to male-on-male sex habits, rather than the causal effects found in current studies. Public health studies found incarcerated men, when returned to their communities, raise the risk of infection by passing the virus on to heterosexual partners, having acquired it in prison due to higher than average rates of sexual assault and rape, no access to condoms, injectable drugs and lack of clean needles, along with tattooing, and inadequate access to health care and treatment after being released due to poverty and unemployment. The studies also found that the high rates of incarceration reduced the number of available men in black communities and rupture social relationships, leading each man to have an increase in the number of concurrent sexual partners.

Institutional racism can affect minority health directly through health-related policies, as well as through other factors indirectly. For example, racial segregation disproportionately exposed black communities to chemical substances such as lead paint, respiratory irritants such as diesel fumes, crowding, litter, and noise. Members of racial minority groups that have a disadvantaged status in education and employment are more likely to be uninsured, which significantly impedes them from accessing preventive, diagnostic, or therapeutic health services.

Racial minorities in the United States are exposed to greater health and environmental risks than the general population. In 1982, there was a proposed polychlorinated biphenyl landfill in an African-American community in Warren County, NC. PCBs are toxic chemicals that can leach into the groundwater and contaminate the drinking water supply. The community resisted and said this was an act of environmental racism. This incident is considered to be the beginning of the environmental justice movement: a movement to address the injustice that communities of color face. Research shows that there is racial discrimination in the enforcement of environmental laws and regulations. People of color and the poor are more likely to live, work and play in America's most polluted environments. Communities of color tend to be disproportionately exposed to lead, pesticides, and petrochemical plants. Unfortunately, race and class is a reliable indicator of where industrial plants and waste facilities are located. Institutional environmental racism encompasses these land use decisions that contribute to health issues such as asthma, obesity and diabetes.

The opioid epidemic in the United States is overwhelmingly white, sparing African-American and Latino communities because doctors unconsciously prescribe narcotics more cautiously to their non-white patients. "Racial stereotyping is having a protective effect on non-white populations," according to Dr. Andrew Kolodny, the co-director of the Opioid Policy Research Collaborative at Brandeis.

The COVID-19 pandemic disproportionately affected African Americans, with more dying of the disease during its initial wave than other racial groups. In testifying before Congress, the leading epidemiologist on the U.S. Coronavirus task force, Dr. Anthony Fauci, testified that a combination of factors affect the disproportionate numbers of minorities infected. In responding as to whether institutional racism has played a part in the data gleaned by the CDC, he pointed out the risk of infection along with underlying conditions in certain demographics was a factor, but affirmed his opinion that this was the case. A Queen's University Belfast study found that there is insufficient evidence to attribute the greater susceptibility of black, Middle-Eastern and Asian individuals to the virus.

Black women are two and one-half times more likely to die from maternal causes than are white women. The infant-mortality rate for African Americans is 11 per 1,000 births, which is higher than the 2018 U.S. average of 5.7. There exists a persistent racial gap between black and white Americans in life expectancy; on average this life-expectancy gap is around 4 years. However, this greatly varies depending on both the state and city level. For example, in Wisconsin, the black-white life expectancy gap is about 6 years for females and 7 years for males, and in Washington D.C this gap is about 12 years for females and greater than 17 years among males.

== In criminal conviction ==
Although approximately one third of crack cocaine users are white or Hispanic people (reported past-year use in 2013 of 0.8%, 0.3% and 0.1% for blacks, whites and Hispanics, respectively), a large percentage of people convicted of possession of crack cocaine in federal courts in 1994 were black people. In 1994, 86.3% of the defendants convicted of crack cocaine possession were black people, while 10.3% were whites and 5.2% were Hispanics. Possession of powder cocaine was more racially mixed, with 52% of the offenders being whites, 29.7% blacks, and 17% Hispanics. Within the federal judicial system, a person convicted of possession with intent to distribute powder cocaine carries a five-year sentence for quantities of 500 grams or more, while a person convicted of possession with intent to distribute crack cocaine faces a five-year sentence for quantities of 5 grams or more. With the combination of severe and unbalanced drug-possession laws, along with the rates of conviction in terms of race, the judicial system has created a racial disparity. In 2015, sitting President Barack Obama visited a federal prison (a presidential first) to discuss how disparate sentencing affected prisoners and highlight how, in the United States, excessive sentencing was a detrimental outcome of harsh sentencing laws, as well as to discuss the need to change the approach. In the Senate, top Republican and Democratic senators, in a rare bipartisan effort, negotiated for months to produce concrete fixes to these laws. The law was changed in 2010 to reduce disparity; it affected only new cases. The need, according to Senate, was for a retroactive fix to reduce the thousands serving long sentences after four decades of extreme sentencing policies. Studies have shown it is possible to reduce both prison populations and crime at the same time. The U.S. Sentencing commission announced a retroactive reduction in drug sentences following a year-long review, which will result in a mass release of 6,000 prisoners, all of whom have already served substantial time in prison. This action was done in an effort to reduce overcrowding and provide comfort to wrongfully accused drug offenders who were sent to jail over the past couple of decades. Some of those to be released will be deported, and all will be subject to further judicial review.

The issue of policies that target minority populations in large cities, also known as stop and frisk and arrest quotas, as practiced by the NYPD, have receded from media coverage due to lawsuits that have altered the practice. In Floyd vs City of New York, a ruling that created an independent Inspector General's office to oversee the NYPD, the federal judge called a whistle-blower's recordings of superiors' use of "quotas" the 'smoking gun evidence' that police were racially profiling and violating civilians' civil rights. The police officer at the center of the case settled with the city for $1.1 million and in a separate case won an additional settlement against the hospital where he was involuntarily confined after cops retaliated and unlawfully placed him in a psych ward for reporting fudged stats in his precinct. After taking office in 2014, New York City Mayor Bill de Blasio declined to continue litigating stop-and-frisk practices, and the number of minorities stopped under the practice dropped dramatically. The use of quotas to pad arrest figures also has fallen after lawsuits exposed the practice as carried on by drug enforcement officers.

A Stanford University study that analyzed 93 million traffic stops in the United States revealed that African Americans are twenty percent more likely to be stopped despite being less likely to be in possession of contraband compared to white people. In the state of California, 38% of people halted by police officers in Los Angeles were black people, despite accounting for only 9% of the population. In Washington, D.C., black people make up 46% of the population but composed 72% of the people stopped even though the difference in contraband hit rates between blacks and whites are not statistically significant. In Boston, blacks made up 64% of those stopped despite making up only 24% of the population; even after controlling for alleged gang involvement and prior arrest records, blacks were more likely to experience repeat police encounters and to be frisked or searched during an encounter. In Illinois, minority drivers are stopped 1.5 more times than white drivers, and Latino drivers are nearly 2 times more likely to be subjected to dog-sniff searches than are non-Hispanic whites but are found with contraband 1.6 times less often.

A Harvard University study found that in Massachusetts's criminal justice system minorities face greater risk to be represented across all parts of the criminal justice system in excess of their proportion of the population in that state. The likelihood that they will get arrested and convicted due to drug or weapons charges is eight times greater than for whites. Black people were found to receive average sentences that were 238 days longer, and Latino people 178 days longer, for the same offences. The study concluded that regarding 'stop and frisk' "The disparity in searches was more consistent with racial bias than with differences in criminal conduct,". The 24 percent of the city of Boston's population that was black made up 83 percent of those interrogated or frisked by police.

The Southern Poverty Law Center (SPLC) has found that, since 2008, after Barack Obama's election into office, racist hate groups have increased above 400%. The SPLC asserts that racism at the institutional level dies hard, and is still prevalent in many U.S. institutions, including law enforcement and the criminal justice system. Frequently these institutions use racial profiling along with greater police brutality. Another major disparity between race and capital punishment in the United States is that murder cases with white victims were more likely than those with black victims to result in a death sentence.

A recent report by former Homeland Security secretary Jeh Johnson found both overt and institutional racism to be a pervasive problem in the NYS court system. Citing a "Second class system of justice for people of color in NYS", Johnson's report set out recommendations to combat bias and systematic racism in interactions between the court system and people of color, particularly in New York City. Chief administrative Judge Lawrence K. Marks found the reports findings troubling and said the state would attempt to implement all the report's solutions. The report also highlighted intolerant racism among court officers. The team conducted interviews of over 300 court personnel, including lawyers whom reported instances of discrimination from court officers and Judges. Judges who were interviewed said that the lack of resources in the busiest courts had a disparate impact on minority clients making up the bulk of cases, and judicial diversity failed to mitigate the effect as few black candidates could pass muster in Upstate New York, where connections mattered in their appointment as judges. One judge said the reluctance to provide funding to New York city courts was "the very definition of institutional bias".

== Anti-Drug Abuse Act of 1986 ==
The disparity between the sentences given to black people and white offenders has been most highlighted by that of crack- and powdered-cocaine offenses, which received disparate sentencing pursuant to federal law. Between 1986 and 1997, the number of federal drug prisoners quintupled, with 74% of those minorities convicted of low-level drug offenses and sentenced under mandatory minimum laws and later added conspiracy amendments to the law.

Members of Congress and state legislators believed these harsh, inflexible sentences would catch those at the top of the drug trade and deter others from entering it. Instead, this broad response to the drug problem brought in more low-level offenders, which resulted in overcapacity prison populations and increased burdens for taxpayers. Mandatory sentencing laws disproportionately affected minorities and, because of their severity, families were destroyed. As a result, many states are experiencing efforts to roll back these laws and there are efforts in Congress to end mandatory minimums. (See Mandatory sentencing.)

== Juvenile court ==
A federal investigation initiated before the 2014 Michael Brown shooting in Ferguson, Missouri, found faults with the treatment given youths in the juvenile justice system in St. Louis County, Missouri. The Justice Department, following a 20-month investigation based on 33,000 cases over three years, reported that black youths were treated more harshly than were whites and that all low-income youths, regardless of race, were deprived of their basic constitutional rights. Youths who encountered law enforcement got little or no chance to challenge detention or get any help from lawyers. With only one public defender assigned to juveniles in a county of one million, and that Legal Aid handled 394 cases in 2014. The investigation was unrelated to the notorious case that roiled St. Louis, beginning before the police shooting of the unarmed black youth. The failure to grant access to counsel brought to light the practice of an informal process that could let offenders off with a warning or having them enter into diversion programs in lieu of being charged in court. But to be accepted into the informal process, offenders had to admit to guilt, which runs afoul of the right not to incriminate oneself in criminal proceedings. The investigation following Michael Brown's shooting found an enormous disparity in the way juvenile cases were handled, with black youths being 67% more likely than whites to be put through the formal criminal proceedings. It also found them more likely to be held in detention, and also subsequently sentenced to incarceration once the case was finished. They were also more likely to be detained for violating parole from a previous case.

The county did not cooperate fully with the Justice Department, and the St. Louis Family Court declined to comment, as did the state court system, of which it is a part. A Justice Department official faulted "the role of implicit bias when there are discretionary decisions to be made". They also reported that the court rarely considers the evidence for probable cause and juveniles are illegally denied the opportunity to challenge that evidence or a transfer of the case out of the juvenile justice system to adult court. In most state courts, the public defender's office decides who is poor enough to merit representation; in St. Louis Family Court the judge or court commissioner, sometimes based on different standards, decides who gets access to counsel. Most troubling to the justice official was the continuing use of court officials to recite complicated statutory language about the alleged crimes, then leading the defendants through "formulaic 'do you understand' and yes/no questions." Judges made no effort to find out if the pleas were coerced, whether the child had any criminal intent or especially, did they fully understand the consequences of pleading guilty to the charges. Their competency to take part in their own defense was never established and the legal aide in the cases examined never challenged a probable cause finding, hired an expert witness or challenged hearsay evidence or leading questions and most cases ended with the child pleading guilty. The Civil Rights Division (of the Justice Department) began four investigations beginning in 2013 delving into juvenile justice systems in Mississippi, Tennessee, Texas and Missouri, and, while settlements were reached, it has had to file suit to overcome the disparities in criminal convictions.

Coupled with zero-tolerance discipline in schools, a "one-size-fits-all solution" decried by the American Bar Association, black and Latino youths are more likely to encounter negative contact with law enforcement and accrue violations, which leads to fines and failure to pay, which in turn leads to warrants and/or probation violations. This cycle has been shown to put children, particularly low-income minorities, in the school-to-prison pipeline.

== Judicial misconduct ==
In 2010, two Washington state supreme court justices, Richard B. Sanders and James M. Johnson, were baffled at a court meeting to determine the fate of $25,000 in funding for various boards and commissions. They stated that there was too much African-American representation in the prison population because African Americans are known to commit a number of crimes and not because of their race. A black lawyer said that she was shocked to hear these two justices refer to a former Legal Aid lawyer's assertions in a report using the phrase poverty pimp. Shirley Bondon, a state Administrative Office of the Courts (AOC) manager who oversaw court programs critical of the legal system, told the justices that she believed that there was racial "bias in the criminal-justice system, from the bottom up." The response from Justice Saunders was critical of black people, stating that he did not believe that the barriers existed, except for poverty because it might restrict the ability to afford an attorney. James M. Johnson, who was noted as the most conservative judge on the court, agreed, noting that African Americans commit crimes against their own communities, to which Bondon objected, requesting a closed-door meeting with the court. Within, Justice Debra Stephens said that she heard Sanders and Johnson make the comments, including Johnson using the words "you all" or "you people" when he stated that African Americans commit crimes in their own communities. Others who attended the meeting stated that they were offended by the justices' remarks, saying that the comments showed a lack of knowledge and sensitivity. A Kitsap County District Court judge, James Riehl, concurred, as he was "acutely aware" of barriers to equal treatment in the legal system. In 2010, African Americans represented 4 percent of Washington State's population but 20 percent of the prison population. Nationwide, similar disparities have been attributed by researchers to sentencing practices, inadequate legal representation, drug-enforcement policies and criminal-enforcement procedures that unfairly affect African Americans.

In 2020, an investigation revealed that Oklahoma Judges who violated their judicial oaths and failed to comply with laws faced no sanctions as none had been imposed since 2004. Across the United States, thousands more were privately sanctioned in chambers by Supreme Court Justices and had their cases closed without the public ever being notified of what they were charged with. Some of the cases alleged racist statements, failure to notify defendants in jail of their right to a lawyer and lying to state officials investigating misconduct. The report identified 3,600 cases from 2008 to 2018 where judges were disciplined but had their identities hidden, along with the nature of the offences- from public scrutiny. Many of the justices whom resigned under threat of penalty did not face any sanctions and kept practicing law, as they did not admit to wrongdoing and confidential justice was doled out by other judges. The report found that 9 out of 10 judges sanctioned for misconduct were allowed to return to their duties, revealing a lax oversight and lenient disciplinary system in place for significant transgressions.

== Bisbee Deportation ==
In 1918, the U.S. Department of Justice pursued charges against 21 officers and executives of the Phelps Dodge Mining Company for the kidnapping of 1,200 workers across state lines from Bisbee, Arizona. The men were subsequently released based on a pre-trial motion from the defense, claiming that the federal government had no basis for charging them, as no federal law was broken. Arizona officials never initiated criminal proceedings in state court against those responsible for the deportation of workers and their lost wages and other losses. The Justice Department appealed, but in United States v. Wheeler, 254 U.S. 281 (1920), Chief Justice Edward Douglass White wrote for an 8-to-1 majority that the U.S. Constitution did not empower the federal government to enforce the rights of the deportees. Rather it "necessarily assumed the continued possession by the states of the reserved power to deal with free residence, ingress, and egress." Only in a case of "state discriminatory action" would the federal government have a role to play. By this calculated reasoning, the officials situated at the Supreme Court erred in not taking the side that in today's legal lexicon had every right to seek justice and redress, not only for the stolen wages, union busting, false imprisonment and other crimes, but for the inherent right not to be forcibly removed from your home by men with guns and shipped in cattle cars across state lines as many homeowners were. That 8 of the 9 Supreme Court justices concurred and, based on anti-radical speech sentiment at the time (post WWI anti-union and IWW), leads to the conclusion that the government gave the company cover to remove the workers, many of whom were Mexicans advocating for better pay and working condition, to a place in the next state closer to the border with the admonition never to return. That few deportees returned and those that contested the deportations lost their cases to have their homes returned to necessity, and that in 1966 Finally, in United States v. Guest, 383 U.S. 745 (1966), the Supreme Court overruled Chief Justice White's conclusion that the federal government could protect the right to travel only against state infringement.

At the end of the conflict, Attorney General A. Mitchell Palmer and others advocated for a peacetime equivalent of the Sedition Act, using the Bisbee events as a justification. They stated that the only reason the company representatives and local law enforcement had taken the law into their own hands was that the government lacked the power to suppress radical sentiment directly. If the government was armed with appropriate legislation and the threat of long prison terms, private citizens would not feel the need to act. Writing in 1920, Harvard Professor Zechariah Chafee mocked that view: "Doubtless some governmental action was required to protect pacifists and extreme radicals from mob violence, but incarceration for a period of twenty years seems a very queer kind of protection." That this was considered vigilante actions by private citizens duly deputized by the local sheriff gives no weight to the racist component directed towards those of Mexican descent in Arizona, New Mexico, and Texas, who were being systematically forced from their homes in the United States beginning in 1910.

== Lynching of people of Mexican descent ==
Vigilante actions and other acts of violence against Mexicans in the Southwest were documented from the 1850s to the 1930s. At least hundreds perhaps thousands of Mexicans were killed by white Anglo Americans and government forces, many of the victims were American citizens. Some of them were killed by people who wanted to drive them off their land and others were killed because they were suspected of being bandits or rebels. Many of them were lynched, including some who were taken from jail cells and killed in front of hundreds of people. 571 Mexicans were lynched between 1848 and 1928. Some Mexicans were killed in response to bandit raids, others were killed after they were accused of committing murders, others were killed after they were accused of stealing cattle, others were killed after they were accused of cheating at cards, and others were killed after they protested against injustice. For example, a month after the Brite Ranch raid in Texas, Rangers committed the Porvenir massacre near the Mexican border where 15 men and boys were executed and falsely accused of being involved in the raid. Efforts to increase awareness of the Porvenir massacre were initially stalled by the state commission on historic places, with the chairwoman of the local historical commission opposing the construction of a marker, claiming that it was being used by 'militant Hispanics' who wanted to receive reparations. She was later over-ruled by the head of the State Historical Commission, who brokered a deal by promising to erect a marker at the site of the Porvenir massacre in addition to promising to erect markers at Anglo ranches that were attacked by suspected Mexican Villistas.

== Palmer Raids ==
According to the United States Department of Justice, Palmer violated his oath of office by misusing the Department of Justice to go illegally after those advocating for better wages. Strikers became targets of agent provocateurs who infiltrated meetings of "communist labor" and anti-war activists. After the Bisbee deportations became exposed in the press, Americans were divided about the treatment of illegal aliens, who were purported communists. Former President Theodore Roosevelt opined in the press that the Bisbee miners "had it coming, as they were hell-bent on havoc!" The Department of Justice went from advocating for persons deprived of rights and liberty by state actors to detaining them under dubious warrants and suspicion of radicalism. The Red Scare that fueled institutional racism in the 1920s against Russian Jews and other Eastern European immigrants was a backlash to the 1917 Bolshevik revolution in Russia and a bombing campaign early in 1919 by Italian anarchists advocating the overthrow of the government. The result was the infamous Palmer raids, ostensibly a deportation measure to remove dangerous aliens. In 1919 Attorney General A. Mitchell Palmer began a series of raids cooked up to remove radicals and anarchists from the United States. Warrants were requested from compliant officials in the Labor Department, and a number of foreign nationals caught up in the sweeping raids were eventually deported. As only the department of labor had the legal right to deport aliens, they did object to the methods; nevertheless, under color of law, the raids began on 7 November 1919. It was led by a 24-year-old J. Edgar Hoover heading a new division of the Justice Department's Bureau of Investigation, called the General Intelligence Division. Armed with responsibility for investigating the programs of radical groups and identifying their members, the raids began with agents of the Bureau of Investigation, together with local police, executing a series of well-publicized and violent raids against the Union of Russian Workers in 12 cities.

Newspaper accounts reported some were "badly beaten" during the arrests. Many later swore they were threatened and beaten during questioning. Government agents cast a wide net, bringing in some American citizens, passers-by who admitted being Russian, some not members of the Russian Workers. Others were teachers conducting night school classes in space shared with the targeted radical groups. Arrests far exceeded the number of warrants. Of 650 arrested in New York City, the government managed to deport just 43. Hoover organized the next raids. He successfully persuaded the Department of Labor to ease its insistence on promptly informing those arrested that they had the right to an attorney. Instead, Labor issued instructions that its representatives could wait until after the case against the defendant was established, "in order to protect government interests". Less openly, Hoover decided to interpret Labor's agreement to act against the Communist Party to include a different organization, the Communist Labor Party. Finally, despite the fact that Secretary of Labor William B. Wilson insisted that more than membership in an organization was required for a warrant, Hoover worked with more compliant Labor officials and overwhelmed Labor staff to get the warrants he wanted. Justice Department officials, including Palmer and Hoover, later claimed ignorance of such details.

The Justice Department launched a series of raids on 2 January 1920, with follow-up operations over the next few days. Smaller raids extended over the next six weeks. At least 3,000 were arrested, and many others were held for various lengths of time. The entire enterprise replicated the November action on a larger scale, including arrests and seizures without search warrants, as well as detention in overcrowded and unsanitary holding facilities. Hoover later admitted "clear cases of brutality". Some cases in Boston included torture, where detainees were placed in a 'hot box' above a furnace and given one glass of water and a slice of bread a day and kept there for 50 hours. The raids covered more than 30 cities and towns in 23 states, but those west of the Mississippi and south of Ohio were "publicity gestures" designed to make the effort appear nationwide in scope. Because the raids targeted entire organizations, agents arrested everyone found in organization meeting halls, not only arresting non-radical organization members but also visitors who did not belong to a target organization, and sometimes American citizens not eligible for arrest and deportation. In a few weeks, after changes in personnel at the Department of Labor, Palmer faced a new and very independent-minded Acting Secretary of Labor in Assistant Secretary of Labor Louis Freeland Post, who canceled more than 2,000 warrants as being illegal. Of the 10,000 arrested, 3,500 were held by authorities in detention; 556 resident aliens were eventually deported under the Immigration Act of 1918.

== Other events ==
On 28 May 1920, the ACLU published its "Report Upon the Illegal Practices of the United States Department of Justice", which carefully documented the Justice Department's unlawful arrest of suspected radicals, illegal entrapment by agents provocateurs, and unlawful incommunicado detention. Such prominent lawyers and law professors as Felix Frankfurter, Roscoe Pound and Ernst Freund signed it. Harvard Professor Zechariah Chafee criticized the raids and attempts at deportations and the lack of legal process in his 1920 volume Freedom of speech. He wrote: "That a Quaker should employ prison and exile to counteract evil-thinking is one of the saddest ironies of our time." The Rules Committee gave Palmer a hearing in June, where he attacked Post and other critics whose "tender solicitude for social revolution and perverted sympathy for the criminal anarchists...set at large among the people the very public enemies whom it was the desire and intention of the Congress to be rid of." The press saw the dispute as evidence of the Wilson administration's ineffectiveness and division as it approached its final months.

In June 1920, a decision by Massachusetts District Court Judge George W. Anderson ordered the discharge of 17 arrested aliens and denounced the Department of Justice's actions. He wrote that "a mob is a mob, whether made up of Government officials acting under instructions from the Department of Justice or of criminals and loafers and the vicious classes." His decision effectively prevented any renewal of the raids.

In Montana, copper miners were dissatisfied with the Western Federation of Miners and thus clashes between the miners were formed leading to the detainment of many workers in the field. The U.S. District Court Judge George M. Bourquin, wrote in a decision granting a writ releasing them on 12 February 1920, "The Declaration of Independence, the writings of the Fathers of our Country, the Revolution, the Constitution and the Union, all were inspired to overthrow the like governmental tyranny. They are yet living, vital, potential forces to safeguard all domiciled in the country, aliens as well as citizens. If evidence of the alien's evil advocacy and teaching is so wanting that it exists in only that herein, and as secured herein, he is a far less danger to this country that are the parties who in violation of law and order, of humanity and justice, have brought him to deportation. They are the spirit of intolerance incarnate, and the most alarming manifestation in America today." In so saying, he placed the blame for the actions taken squarely on those creating a hysteria against a primarily Russian ethnic minority, and who managed to sidestep all blame by continuing to call such actions lawful. Hoover went on to head the FBI, which over its history also came to be known for the institutional racism of the COINTELPRO, Martin Luther King Jr. and Malcolm X operations and Palmer lost all support for his bid seeking the Democratic presidential nomination to replace Wilson. The judge summed it up neatly; "Thoughtful men who love this country and its institutions see more danger in them and in their practices and the government by hysteria they stimulate, than in the miserable, hated "Reds" that are the ostensible occasion of them all. Those people may confidently assume that even as the "Reds", they too in due time will pass, and the nation still lives. It is for the courts to deal with both, to hold both in check when brought within the jurisdiction." Zechariah Chafee went on to write many significant works about civil liberties. His first book, Freedom of Speech, established modern First Amendment theory.

== In immigration ==
Many other minority groups were also victims of institutional racism. For example, immigration bans were imposed on Chinese people. On the West Coast during the 1870s, the intensifying competition for jobs between Chinese workers and whites motivated some whites to launch an anti-Chinese movement. The first Chinese Exclusion Act of 1882 was passed to prohibit Chinese from immigrating to the United States, as a result, only ten Chinese immigrants entered the United States in 1887. The 1917 Asiatic Barred Zone Act, sought to block immigration from Turkey to Indonesia and China, eliminating virtually all new arrivals from the South Asian subcontinent and Southeast Asia. There were other anti-immigration policies throughout U.S. history against France and Ireland in the late 1700s, and Southern Europeans, Eastern Europeans, Jews, Africans, Arabs, East Asians and Indians with the Immigration Act of 1924. Anti-immigration sentiment can also affect minorities who have been U.S. citizens for many generations, such as the internment of Japanese Americans during the World War 2 and Mexican Repatriation of the 1930s. The 1965 Immigration Act reversed the national-origins quota system that had been in place since the 1920s, which had discriminated against certain ethnic minorities, particularly those originating in the Eastern Hemisphere.

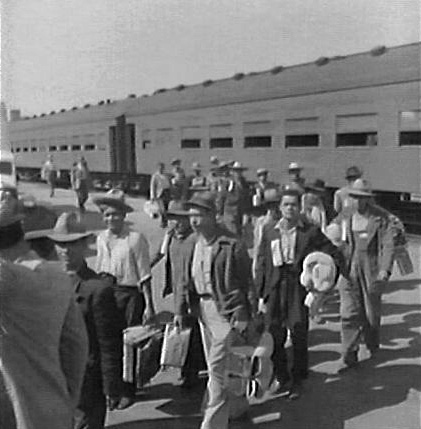
Bracero program

Between 1929 and 1939, during the Great Depression, 355,000 to one million Mexicans and Mexican Americans were repatriated or deported to Mexico, 40 to 60% of whom were U.S. citizens, overwhelmingly children. Voluntary repatriation was more common than formal deportation. The government formally deported at least 82,000 people to Mexico between 1929 and 1935. According to the INS, around 400,000 to 1 million Mexicans and Mexican-Americans moved to Mexico during the 1930s. Few were formally deported, with most going to Mexico from their own towns where officials using threats of deportation coerced them; or were repatriated through voluntary – though often coercive – repatriation programs directed by state and local governments, and charitable aid agencies.

The repatriation campaign was a response to migration west by the Oakies and housing and wage labor shortages in the United States during the Great Depression. Until the Great Depression, many American citizens had seen the value of the Mexicans as cheap labor. With increased poverty and fewer jobs, many Americans and officials scapegoated Mexicans. The Secretary of Labor in the Hoover administration, William N. Doak (Hoovervilles) scapegoated "illegal immigrants" (migrant workers) as taking jobs from Americans. While not specifying Mexicans, repatriation campaigns overwhelmingly targeted Mexicans. In 1931, the National Commission on Law Observance and Enforcement, the Wickersham Commission found the methods employed by Doak's subordinates to be unconstitutional. The policy continued into the administration of Franklin D. Roosevelt.

According to Abraham Hoffman, "from 1931 on, cities and counties across the country intensified and embarked upon repatriation programs, conducted under the auspices of either local welfare bureaus or private charitable agencies". The Los Angeles chairman of the board of supervisors' charities and public welfare committee (and later Los Angeles mayor), Frank L. Shaw had researched the legality of deportation but was advised by that only the federal government was legally allowed to deport people. As a result, the L.A. County supervisors called their campaign "repatriation", which Balderrama asserts was a euphemism for deportation.

C.P. Visel, the spokesman for Los Angeles Citizens Committee for Coordination of Unemployment Relief began his "unemployment relief measure" that would create a "psychological gesture" intended to "scarehead" Mexicans out of Los Angeles, through a series of "publicity releases announcing the deportation campaign, a few arrests would be made 'with all publicity possible and pictures', and both police and deputy sheriffs would assist". The Bureau of Immigration was responsible for many mass raids and deportations, and the local government was responsible for the media attention given to these raids to "scarehead" immigrants, specifically Mexicans, provoking many complaints and criticisms from the Mexican Consulate and the Spanish-language magazine La Opinión.

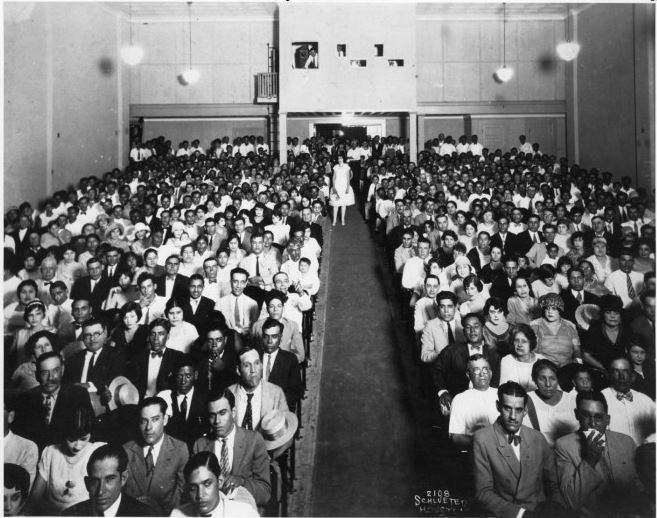
Interior Azteca Theater, Houston, Texas, 15 July 1927

Numerous books have been written about the repatriations including 'Decade of Betrayal', by social history professor Raymond Rodriguez and Francisco Balderrama. In 1995, they wrote a book, which sparked legislative hearings and formal apologies from the state of California and Los Angeles County officials. In 2006, the House of Representatives congresspersons Hilda Solis and Luis Gutierrez called for an apology from the U.S. Government for the Repatriation. The Mexican repatriation campaign is not widely discussed in U.S. textbooks. In a 2006 survey of the nine most commonly used American history textbooks in the United States, four did not mention the topic, and only one devoted more than half a page to the topic. In total, they devoted four pages to the repatriation.

The Mexican labor that supplied U.S. agribusiness has cycled between needing workers and calls to repatriate them. Some calls were by Mexican farmers, because from time to time there were acute labor shortages in Mexico. With the growing diplomatic and security issues surrounding illegal border crossings, the INS increased its raids and apprehensions beginning in the early 1950s leading up to Operation Wetback in 1954 in cooperation with the Mexican government. While the Bracero program was in force, the INS deported one million Mexicans starting in 1954. Those apprehended were often deported without recovering property or contacting family and were often stranded without food or employment when they entered Mexico. Deported Mexicans often faced extreme conditions, and some were left in the desert; 88 deported workers died in 112-degree heat in July 1955. Most deported were sent by ship to Veracruz or transported by land to southern Mexican cities. During the Operation, recruitment of illegal workers by American growers continued due to the inexpensiveness of illegal labor and desire to avoid the bureaucratic obstacles of the Bracero program.

== In the civil service ==
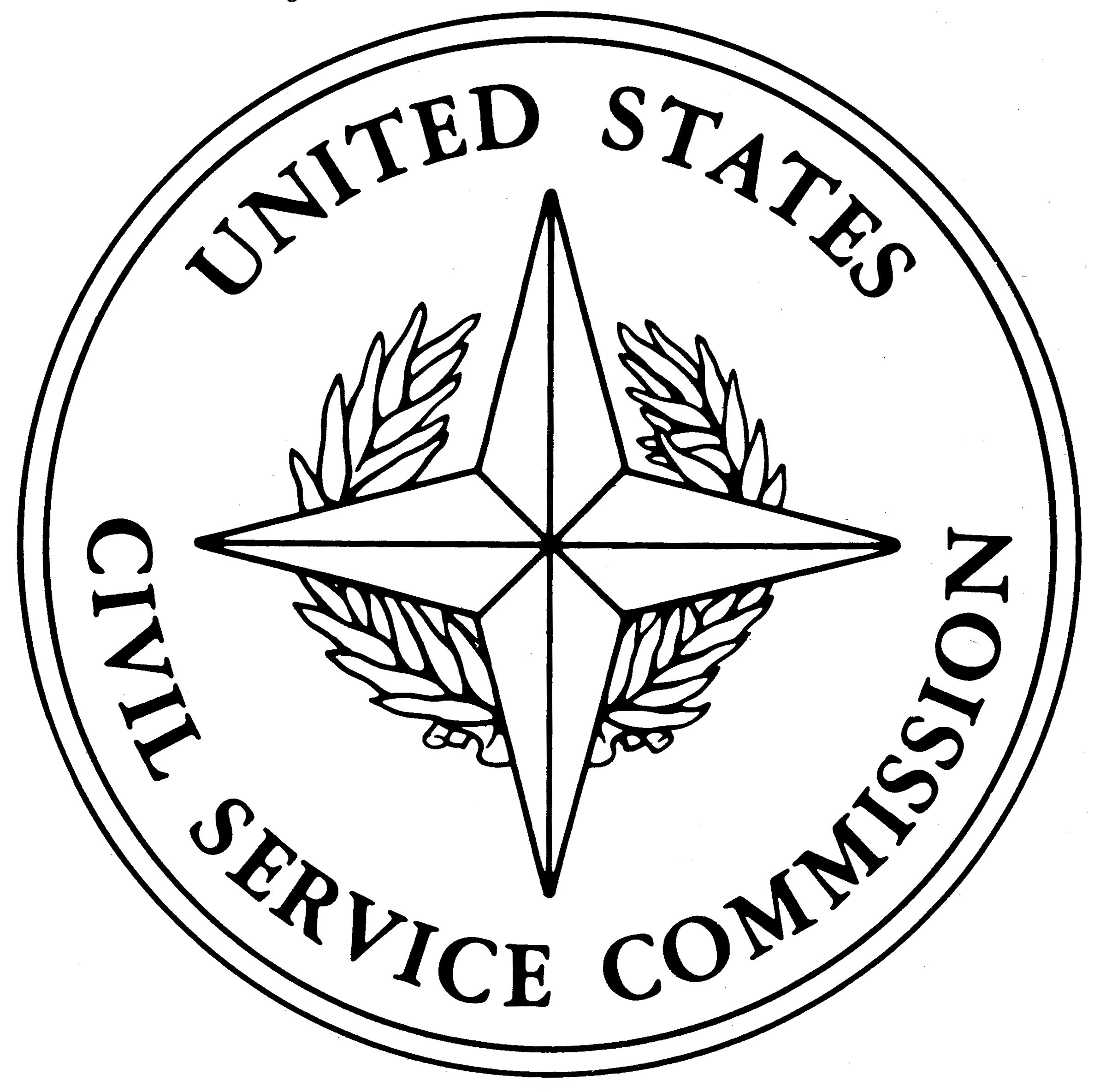
U.S. Civil Service Commission Seal EO11096

Merit-based hiring to civil service titles are race-blind in terms of hiring preferences; in practice, however, there are titles that have resisted integration to the present day. Institutions that resist even past the civil right fights of the 1950s and 1960s resulted in court interventions in the 1970s and even up to the last decade. Many of the Consent Decrees that resulted from court intervention came about as a result of the federal government intervening due to EEOC complaints in hiring or attempts to litigate discrimination that was overt. Until 2007, when the Vulcan Society of the FDNY prevailed in court using the legal theory of disparate impact, many lawsuits resulted in racial quotas being imposed in hiring. Police and Fire Departments across the country have been slow to change the insular culture that kept them lacking in diversity and open to challenges.

Civil Service, as an institution, was traditionally used to prevent nepotism and the influence of politics in appointments to the position. Authorized at the federal level in 1871, it came about due to reforms of the spoils system in place since the 1830s, and abuses of the post-Civil War era, when Congress authorized the president to appoint a Civil Service Commission and prescribe regulations for admission to public service. A dissatisfied office-seeker assassinated President Garfield in 1881, and Congress was motivated to pass the Pendleton Civil Service Reform Act in 1883, which firmly established the Civil Service. During Reconstruction, this enabled the federal government to provide jobs for newly freed black people in the South (primarily the Postal Service) where no other employment opportunities existed for them. Since the inception of the merit system in 1881, the numbers of black people in federal Civil Service positions rose from 0.057 to 5.6% by 1910. Since 1883, the majority of federal employees are placed in positions that are classified by Civil Service designations. (see Also: U.S. Civil Service Reform)

In 1913, with segregation the law of the land, Southern Democrats in Congress under the administration of President Woodrow Wilson had attempted to remove as many minorities as possible from their established position in the federal Civil Service, especially at the Postal Service. This was accomplished by requiring the race of each applicant to a position be shown by a photograph.

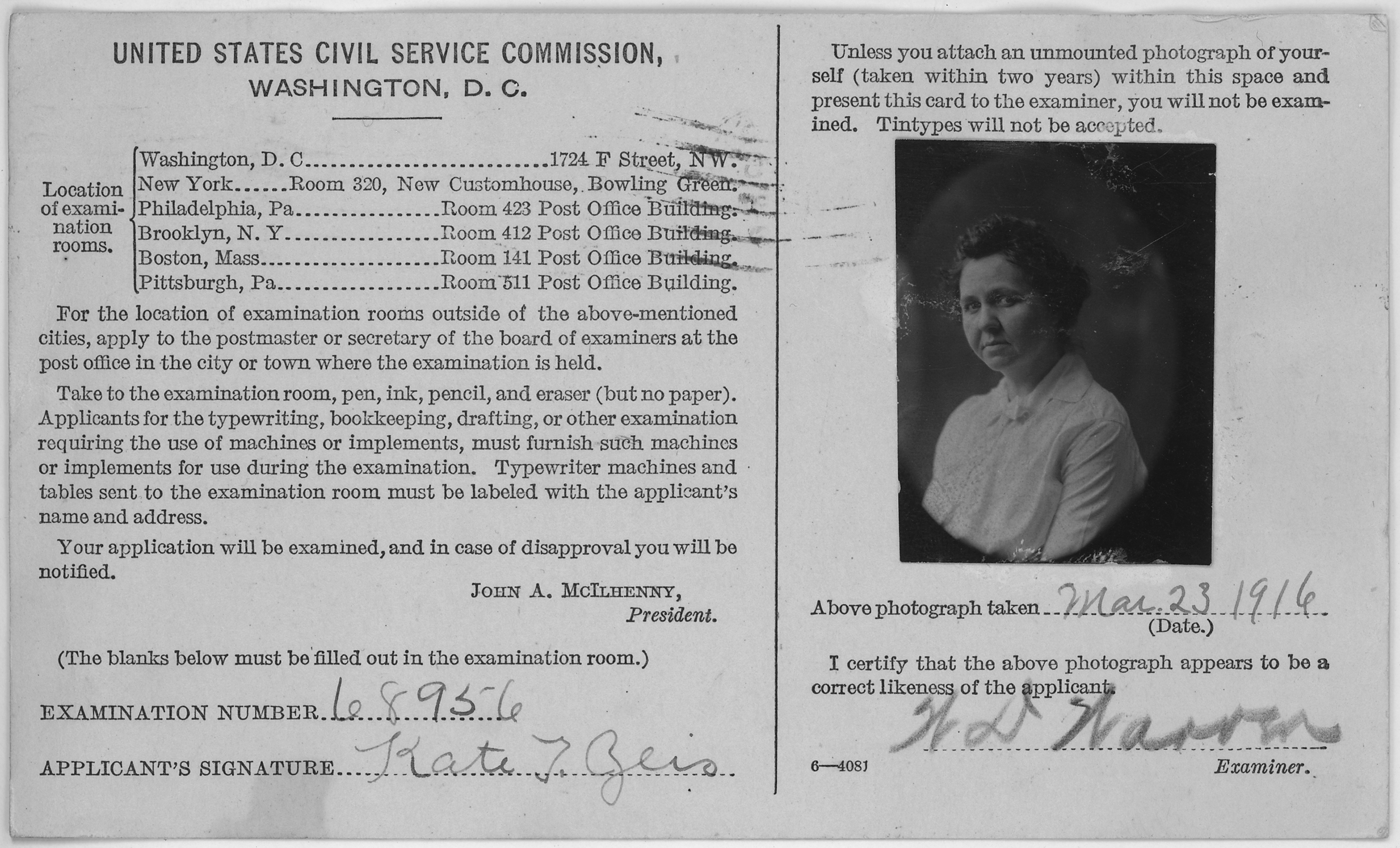
Kate T. Zeis, photo for U.S. Civil Service Commission card – NARA – 285491

This enabled the administration to demote and eliminate black civil servants from positions held in Civil Service and further prevented any new appointments, thus purposefully exacerbating black exclusion from the federal Civil Service. Wilson had campaigned promising to elevate blacks in his administration by matching the patronage offered them by past Republican administrations. Many black newspapers, based on his inaugural speech, supported him, but those Southern Democrats in Congress opposed to integration actively rendered him moot, and patronage appointments fell even lower. Claiming 'friction' among blacks and whites at the post office, they proposed segregating them. This was taken up by the Postmaster General and the Secretary of the Treasury, and when the cabinet and the president did not oppose the measure, Jim Crow practices in some departments was taken up with a vengeance. By 1921, those black postal workers not demoted or fired were behind a wall at the 'Dead Letter Office' in Washington, D.C., or placed behind screens where the other workers did not have to see them. Without any basis in fact or accumulation of complaints to justify segregation, it became unofficial policy. Signs appeared restricting toilets and lunchrooms, whole offices were segregated by room and workers were paired off by race. A virtual flood of proposed discriminatory laws were proposed in Congress ranging from 'Jim Crow' streetcars to excluding blacks from military commissions to officer in the Army or Navy and anti-miscegenation bills. There were also bills to restrict black immigration. This spread to the states where more bills passed restricting black people. Federal Civil Service did not fare well under Wilson, as he held that "it was to their advantage" and "likely to remove many of the difficulties which have surrounded the appointment and advancement of colored men and women", espousing the segregation taking place under his administration.

The next chapter was the Hatch Act of 1939, which prevented state and local civil servants from taking part in political activities or running for office. It was a response to conservative forces in Congress who wanted to prevent administration appointments to certain agencies aligned with the WPA and FDR presidential confidante Harry Hopkins, whom they felt were giving jobs to the 'wrong people'. Until the Brown vs. Board of Education Supreme Court decision and the related cases that ushered in the Civil Rights era, institutional segregation was upheld at the federal level by the Plessy v. Ferguson U.S. Supreme Court case decision, which the court overturned in 1954. Following this, cities consulted with their attorneys and as a result, integration began. This was replaced in turn by institutional racism, the practice of upholding the letter of the law, but not the spirit, in an effort to prevent minority hires from gaining ground in titles where they were disproportionately underrepresented, such as police and fire departments, and in management positions.

== Post-integration period ==
Around the country in the 1950s, black people found common cause in challenging employment discrimination, and the colored newspapers took up the cause. Economically, jobs were becoming scarce for minorities during the post-war years as returning servicemen reclaimed the manufacturing and factory base. Civil Service looked to be a reasonable alternative to black people returning from World War II service overseas and black officers leaving the newly desegregated armed services. In Los Angeles in the 1950s, the NAACP fueled an integration campaign in the California Eagle and petitioned the fire commission to provide more jobs in the LAFD. When the Fire Chief Engineer John Alderson attempted to integrate the department, the resistance to integration created so-called 'Hate Houses' and resulted in the formation of The Stentorians as a protective force of guardians to protect minority firefighters. New York had previously experienced its own revelations when the Vulcan Society appeared before the city council and demanded the elimination of 'the black bed' in firehouses for black firemen. At that hearing in 1944, the NYC council chambers filled with FDNY brass on one side and black firefighters protesting the lack of promotional opportunities and racial harassment on the other.

With that as the backdrop, integration began and segregation was replaced by institutional racism, which took the form much the same way it did when black people first got hired before and during World War II. Black people once appointed to a Civil Service position were subjected to isolation, ostracism, outright hostility and separate quarters. After 1956, the first black hires to the LAFD after integration unfairly failed to finish academy training. The Vulcan Society in New York mentored many blacks, but progress was slow, with hiring not reflected in mirroring the population of the cities served until the passage of the Civil Rights Act of 1964, when the number of minority hirings increased. The U.S. Department of Labor in the 1970s began enforcing racial quotas during the Nixon administration that mandated black hiring, but it was the lawsuits of the 1970s that exploded the imposition of consent decrees across the country forcing the diversity of the hard to integrate titles. In 1971, the Vulcan Blazers of the Baltimore, Maryland fire department filed a groundbreaking lawsuit that resulted in the appointment of blacks to positions of officers up to assistant chief when the court ruled there had been discrimination in promotions. Other minority groups followed their lead and also took to the courts. In 2009, the City of Baltimore paid $4.6 million to settle a case filed by minority policemen alleging racial discrimination. As other recent lawsuits have proved, civil departments have held their heads responsible for cases of institutional racism, an example of which is the case in 2007 of the LAFD Chief, William Bamattre, who was retired by the mayor of Los Angeles after being perceived of kowtowing to racial pandering in responding to lawsuits affecting his department. Payouts to blacks and women had topped $7.5 million for cases alleging racism and harassment, and also the failure to diversify.

== Affirmative action ==
Affirmative action, while originally meant to refer to a set of policies and practices preventing discrimination based on race, creed, color, and ethnicity, now often refers to policies positively supporting members of disadvantaged or underrepresented groups that have in the past suffered discrimination in areas such as education, employment, and housing. Historically and internationally, support for affirmative action has sought to achieve goals such as bridging inequalities in employment and pay, increasing access to education, promoting diversity, and redressing apparent past wrongs, harms, or hindrances.

In the 1990s President George H. W. Bush attempted to eliminate affirmative action during his term of office. Filing a brief against quotas in college admissions, he also stood against the use of quotas, preferences, and set-asides on the basis of race, sex, religion, or national origin, and abolished their use in hiring. Congress responded with the Civil Rights Act of 1991, which only covered the terms for settling cases where discrimination had previously been confirmed. It had been near impossible to prove a case of institutional discrimination in the courts, and many other cases were terminated upon imposition of a consent decree. While President George H. W. Bush's attempt failed, it did give rise to the 1997 California Proposition 209, a ballot initiative abolishing affirmative action in California universities. This closed down the avenues affirmative action initiatives had opened for minorities, as legislation no longer required California universities to actively facilitate the development of ethnically diverse campus populations. Consequently, employment discrimination lawsuits seeking compensation for discriminatory hiring declined, as arguments for redress on account of past wrongs under the 'catchup provisions' no longer worked in favor of claimants. Proposition 209 has withstood challenges such as the 2013 Amendment No. 5, which would have reversed 209 had it not been retracted by its main Senate sponsor prior to passage. In 2014 the UCLA Board of Regents publicly renounced 209 on account of the decline in minority admissions to California universities after 209 was implemented. The regents reaffirmed this in 2020.

Similar ballot initiatives to California 209 spread around the country, primarily in red states. In the 2003 case of Gratz v. Bollinger, the Supreme Court ruled that the University of Michigan's mis-implementation of affirmative action in its point-allocation-based admittance process had resulted in a homogenized statistical advantage for minority applicants and unconstitutionally rendered the university incapable of differentiating between the distinct diversity contributions of each individual. On the same day and concerning another University of Michigan (Law School) applicant, the supreme court ruled in the case of Grutter v. Bollinger that while failing to recognize the distinct contributions of minority groups was unconstitutional, the overall initiative of affirmative action – creating an inclusive, racially diverse demographic – was not.

Efforts to abolish affirmative action were not limited to California and Michigan. In 2008 American Civil Rights Institute chairman Ward Connerly successfully campaigned for the passage of legislation banning affirmative action in Nebraska. Three of the five states that ACRI pushed anti-affirmative action ballots in rejected them and it failed to make the ballot in another. Connerly stated, "I think that in some quarters, many parts of the country, a white male is really disadvantaged... Because we have developed this notion of women and minorities being so disadvantaged and we have to help them, that we have, in many cases, twisted the thing so that it's no longer a case of equal opportunity. It's a case of putting a fist on the scale."

Conservative objections to affirmative action include that although aimed at rectifying discriminatory practices, affirmative action is inherently discriminatory against the majority and the fulfillment of 'racial quotas' precludes employers from hiring the most qualified candidate available for a position. Supporters of affirmative action cite the extent to which past institutionalized racism adversely affected minorities. Their endorsement of measures to aid in the restitution of agency to marginalized and disenfranchised communities has resulted in push back in the form of claims of reverse racism.

In 2020, a study concluded that proposition 209 had caused harm to black and Hispanic students without any tangible gains for white or Asian students replacing them in the University of California system. With repeal of the controversial measure on the California ballot in 2020, the eleven other states that passed similar anti-affirmative action laws are also reviewing its effects on their minority admissions. Conservatives are still at the supreme court challenging race based admissions, with the DOJ under the Trump administration suing Yale university over alleged discrimination.

== In education ==
Standardized testing has also been considered a form of institutional racism, because it is believed to be biased in favor of people from particular socio-cultural backgrounds. Some minorities have consistently tested worse than whites on virtually all standardized tests, even after controlling for socioeconomic status, while others have tested consistently better. The cause of the achievement gaps between black, Hispanic, white and Asian students has yet to be fully elucidated.

Three cases before the SCOTUS have determined whether there is institutional racism in education. Bakke (1978) allowed minorities to gain an edge in university admissions and hiring. Justice O'Connor's swing vote in Grutter (2003) was a rebuke of Proposition 209 and similar initiatives, giving a 25-year timeline where such interventions would no longer be necessary. Schuette (2013) allowed states to ban race-based affirmative action in public university admissions. Through the use of discriminatory ballot initiatives (1997–2008) to bypass the law, gaining public acceptance of anti-affirmative action endeavors, the process of placing undue burdens on minorities seeking advancement has, in this century, become entrenched. In her dissent to Schutte, Associate Justice Sonia Sotomayor wrote that the voters of Michigan had "changed the basic rules of the political process in that State in a manner that uniquely disadvantaged racial minorities." Citing reverse-racism after the effects have been proven deleterious to minority admissions is repeating failed policy and furthers this bias. This offends portions of the Civil Rights Act of 1964, where discrimination on the basis of race, color, religion, sex or national origin was prohibited.

== In higher education ==
In the 1960s, students of color started attending colleges and universities in record numbers after the passage of the Civil Rights and Higher Education Acts. However, the obstacles of integration in predominantly white institutions of higher education led to unforeseen obstacles for faculty and students of color working and studying in such environments. According to a review of educational research, tension and violence followed, one reason being the lack of preparedness of many colleges and universities to teach a diversity of students. Initially, it was also difficult for many black students to attend college due to the poor quality of education in segregated schools.

The 1954 Brown vs. Board of Education decision was the beginning of the process of desegregation and the elimination of de jure discrimination. However, it was hard to determine the challenges that the process would present and the obstacles that would continue to exist. While the concept of "separate but equal" had been overturned by the U.S. Supreme Court, it was clear that the racial divide had not yet been resolved. As the years since Brown v. Board of Education passed, both verbal and physical abuse continued. After Brown v. Board of Education, the desegregated environment proved to be strenuous and was going to require some work. The increase of racial tension and racial incidents in institutes of higher education is said to be due to the "lack of knowledge, experience, and contact with diverse peers; peer-group influence; increased competition and stress; the influence of off-campus groups and the media; alcohol use; changing values; fear of diversity; and the perception of unfair treatment". Although Brown v. Board of Education was ruled in 1954, actual integration did not completely occur until many years later; the U.S. Supreme Court held multiple hearings on the desegregation of schools, continuously they maintained that Brown v. Board of Education must be followed by schools, colleges, and universities. The manner in which Brown v. Board of Education was drawn out years after the decision helped instill racism in education by illustrating the extraordinary lengths some educational institutions would go to avoid integration.

In 2008, the National Center for Education Statistics reported that while enrollment of minorities and students of color had risen, white enrollment still held the majority on average, accounting for 63 percent of undergraduate college and university students; however, 66 percent of the population was white in 2008. While this varies based on the region, state, and elite status, in general the majority of colleges and universities in the United States are predominantly white reflecting the white population percentage. According to the U.S. Department of Education, there had been a rise in hate crimes on college campuses, with 1250 hate crimes in 2016, up 25 percent from 2015; however, in 2019, all reported racial, ethnic, religious, sexual orientation, gender, gender identity, and disability hate crimes totaled 757, while racially motivated intimidation, destruction, damage, vandalism, and simple assault totaled 329.

Preparation for post-secondary education seems to be an issue. According to the U.S. Department of Education, being prepared for college is integral to whether or not a student is successful. While the government offers college preparation programs for minority and low-income students, programs such as GEAR UP and Federal TRIO Programs help prepare students for college to better ensure their success and retention, the access to these programs is relatively limited. While programs such as Federal TRIO Programs have grown since conception, there is still work that needs to be done if more minority students are expected to attend and succeed in a post-secondary institution. Due to availability of Federal TRIO Programs being subjective based on where geographically a student may be, the benefits are not completely being felt be the targeted communities. However, the positive effects of Federal TRIO Programs have been pretty bolstering – more minorities and low-income individuals are prepared when going to post-secondary institutions.

Despite efforts to improve the situation on college and university campuses, such as implementing affirmative action plans, anti-black racism and violence continue to occur. The effects of this violence extend beyond the incident itself. According to a U.S. study in Baltimore, racism has a correlation with health complications, such as high systolic blood pressure. Likewise, a study held from 1997 to 2003 found that racism led to higher rates of breast cancer. While this extends beyond education, it could illustrate why many minorities and students of color would feel uneasy putting themselves into an environment that could potentially garner more racism. While illustrations of institutional racism on college campuses can be found in newspapers and blogs, there are other places to learn more about these incidents. Aside from the media, one source that can be used to keep up to date on institutional racism in higher education is The Journal of Blacks in Higher Education (JBHE). This journal aims to provide as much information as possible about anti-black institutional racism. JBHE publishes resources, statistics, and current reports of race-related actions on college and university campuses. For example, JBHE reported on the 2015 University of Oklahoma Sigma Alpha Epsilon racism incident. Other media resources where reports on racial incidents on college campuses can be found is Inside Higher Ed and the Southern Poverty Law Center

In 2016, the U.S. Department of Education released a report on crime in schools. Of the racial hate crimes reported on college campuses in 2013, 41% were vandalisms, 37% were intimidations, and 38% were simple assaults. According to the U.S. Department of Education, there were 146 reported cases of racial harassment on college and university campuses in 2015. However, this number by no means is a true portrayal of the actual amount of racial harassment that occurs. Research conducted by the Higher Education Research Institute claims that only 13% of these incidents get reported. According to the Center for College Health and Safety, one reason that so few incidents get reported is that there is a lack of awareness about what consists of a hate crime, as well as where one must report such a crime. Although data is limited to what has been reported, the FBI allows public access to numerous tables and statistics about hate crimes reported in 2015. There were 4,029 hate crimes motivated by race/ethnicity/ancestry, 52.7% of which the FBI reports were motivated by anti-black bias. Out of 3,310 racial bias hate crimes, 7.9% occurred at schools/colleges. As of May 2017, the Anti-Defamation League has reported that 107 incidents of white-supremacist posters being posted on American campuses since the beginning of the 2016 school year have been verified. 65 of these reported incidents have occurred since January 2017.

Fakehatecrimes.org provides a database with links to news sources that report hate crimes that have been falsely reported. For example, a student at Capital University claimed to have found a race-related note on his door, and his story was shared on the university newspaper. Later, in another article, the newspaper shared how the student confessed after investigation that he made the story up. Complex, a news source, published an article naming the "most hate-filled colleges in America" based on data from College Stats.

Numerous news sources, including Inside Higher Ed and Southern Poverty Law Center, and the Brookings Institution, reported that there was a spike in racial hate crimes and harassment following the election of Donald Trump as President of the United States. Although each case has not been verified, the SPLC claimed to have counted 201 racial incidents in less than a week. The largest number of incidents are labeled as "anti-black" and account for over 50 of the occurrences, nearly 40 of which took place on college campuses. Kimberly Griffin, a professor at the University of Maryland who studies and has authored numerous publications on campus racial climate, states the following in an Inside Higher Ed article:

We have a president-elect who campaigned on ideas that made what was previously socially unacceptable racism OK by everything from talking about mass deportations and building walls to accepting endorsements from white nationalist groups. The threats students are facing are often directly connected to his rallying cries and campaign promises. I don't think that Trump created these feelings and the rage we see, but his election normalized it and encouraged it

— Kimberly Griffin (PhD, University of California, Los Angeles), "Tensions, Protests, Incidents"

Under Title VI, all higher education institutions that receive federal funding must take certain actions against incidents of racial discrimination that are deemed "sufficiently serious" or that negatively impact a student's education. These actions include investigating the incident, making efforts to stop the current and possible future occurrence, and fixing the issues that have come about due to the incident. Similar to Title VI, the Clery Act is another act that requires higher education institutions that receive federal funding to have certain obligations regarding campus crime. The main requirement is that these institutions must create an annual report that details the crime that has taken place in the past three years on campuses and the efforts made to stop it. These reports must be made available to all students and staff, which allows for greater transparency about the existing crime on campuses.

Students across the nation have worked to end racial discrimination on campuses by organizing and participating in protests. One of the most notable examples is that of the 2015–16 University of Missouri protests, which led to protests at 50 universities. Lists of demands made by students at 80 American universities detailing what should be done to combat racism on campuses have been collected by WeTheProtesters, an advocacy group.

It was found that in California, "medical schools instituted policies restricting admissions of Asian Americans." Nonwhite resident physicians in Massachusetts were studied and "reported experiencing some form of discrimination on the job" and "perceived difficulty in advancing professionally." A study conducted by STAT found that African American resident physicians "either leave or are terminated from training programs at far higher rates than white residents." In 2015, though black resident physicians made up only 5% of the total population of resident physicians, "they accounted for nearly 20% of those who were dismissed" in the same year according to data from the Accreditation Council for Graduate Medical Education. The New England Journal of Medicine published research that demonstrated that Asian American resident physicians and attending physicians "face high levels of harassment and discrimination from peers, supervisors, staff, and patients." Additionally, Asian American trainees and physicians are "likely to be excluded from higher levels of leadership" and "are less likely to be awarded honors."

== Impact on faculty ==
Structural inequality may be ignored under the assumption that racism will disappear within its own time. Racism may be manifest in a variety of ways, including but not limited to, undervaluation of research, unwritten rules and policies regarding the tenure process, and a lack of mentorship for faculty of color. Women of color faculty are often found doubly worse off as they face discrimination based on both race and gender. According to 2020 data, faculty members at institutions of higher education were predominantly white, with faculty of color constituting roughly 26% of total faculty, with 12% Asian, 7% black, 6% Latino, less than 1% American Indian, and 1% two or more races (see chart). Failure to fully implement affirmative action has been identified as another contributing factor to low numbers of representation.

2020 Chronicle of Higher Education Almanac faculty race breakdown
1. White (74.0%)
2. Asian (12.0%)
3. Black (7.00%)
4. Latino (6.00%)
5. American Indian (0.00%)
6. Two or more races (1.00%)

Faculty members of color often engage in research regarding issues of diversity, which many whites deemed "risky". Widespread beliefs founded on the concept of meritocracy, where success is based solely on individual effort, put into question research revealing structural issues that contribute to success. Political undertones of research within the social sciences are used to put the validity and scientific nature of the findings into question, despite the fact that research in these fields is conducted in the same manner as research in less politically contentious areas of interest. Research methodologies long accepted in other disciplines are called into question depending on the implications of findings, particularly when these findings may reveal racial inequities in the general population and/or the institution itself. "Thus, research appearing to be neutral and scholarly, has important political manifestations, including the justification for racial inequalities that are replicated within the student and alumni bodies of institutions that formally state that they value diversity even as all of their internal mechanisms reproduce exclusionary dominance for some racial groups".

This concern is especially glaring in private institutions, where concerns regarding the reception of said research by alumni, corporate interests, and other potential donors play into acceptance of research by faculty. In one case study, race- and diversity-related research deemed valid by the highest level of national disciplinary associations was rejected by faculty and administrators, alluding to the existence and enforcement of unwritten rules regarding research acceptance. The rejection of research by faculty of color is a contributing factor to difficulty attaining tenure, with a higher performance bar set for those whose findings may contradict widely accepted beliefs regarding race relations.

Faculty members of color also face barriers as they work to include topics of diversity in their courses, as whites often resist the inclusion of multicultural perspectives. Challenges in the classroom appear to be connected to issues of gender and age as well as race. For example, African-American women faculty aged 35 and younger are challenged more by whites in their 20s, while those 40 and older face more challenges from students in nontraditional age groups.

== Impact on students ==
American high school student Rufus talks about wanting to see systemic change to end institutional racism in Los Angeles in 2020.

The racial demographics of institutions of higher education in the United States are quickly changing. Institutions of higher education were often traditionally known as "predominantly white institutions" (PWIs). These institutions are now challenged to improve their diversity efforts and create policies that address the root cause of negative racial climates on PWI campuses. It is estimated that by 2010, 40% of high school graduates would be non-white. While racial homogeneity in high schools increased, institutions of higher education were becoming more racially diverse. Due to racial homogeneity in high schools, some college students occasionally find themselves having their first interracial contact in college. Universities and colleges that have identified diversity as one of their priorities should plan how to strategically and in a sensitive manner create a campus climate in which all students, in particular students of color in a PWI, do not have to risk feeling unsafe, discriminated against, marginalized, or tokenized to obtain a post-secondary degree.

Data have shown that students of color and whites have different perceptions of campus racial climates. In a survey of 433 undergraduate students at one institution found that, in comparison to whites, students of color felt differently about campus policies. Whites were more often to describe their campus racial climate as positive, while students of African descent rated it as negative. Findings indicate that students of color experience harassment that is, "offensive, hostile, or intimidating" at higher rates than whites, which interferes with their learning. Further, "students of color perceived the climate as more racist and less accepting than did whites, even though whites recognized racial harassment at similar rates as students of color". In addition, many African-American students have a hard time to fit in at predominantly white colleges because of the fear of "becoming white."

Whites also felt more positive about their classroom experience and the way professors presented various viewpoints in the curriculum, about institutional policies as well as recruitment and retention of Student of Color. Students of African descent and other students of color felt the campus environment was not friendly and that they had been targets of racism. In another study of 5,000 first year students at 93 institutions, whites were more likely to agree with the statement that "racial discrimination is no longer a problem" than students of color. whites were also more likely to feel that the campus climate is improving in comparison to students of color. Whites felt the campus climate was non-racist, friendly, and respectful while students of color felt that it was racist, hostile, and disrespectful. Research has shown that racial diversification in colleges and universities, without intentional education about systemic racism and the history of race in the United States, can lead to creating a racial campus climate that is oppressive towards students of color. History textbooks in the United States generally gloss over the unpleasant portions of history, resulting in many students being unaware of the Trail of Tears, the workers struggles of the 20th century and the removal in the west of the indigenous. There needs to be, "intentional education interventions related to the changing racial composition of college students [which] would likely influence how the climate of an environment changes". If institutional racism is to be addressed in institutes of higher education, different types of interventions need to be created, in particular, interventions created specifically for the academy. Rankin and Reason's research concluded that for intervention to be effective, faculty would need to be used as socializing agents on campus, in particular, because intellectual and behavioral norms on most campuses are set by faculty and, these norms have a heavy impact on campus climate. An example of students trying to change racial campus climate is the Being Black at the University of Michigan #BBUM moment. The Black Student Union is organizing and collaborating with organizations to bring attention to the racial climate at the University of Michigan and how it is affecting all students. To create interventions that lead to sustainable learning about race, institutions of higher education need to equally value the histories and experiences of students of color and whites. One example of this is required coursework through the departments of African/African-American Studies, Chicano studies, Asian-American studies, Arab-American studies, and Native American studies alongside the History department. Research has shown that curricular diversity is positively associated with intergroup attitudes, decreased racial prejudice and intergroup understanding, and attitudes toward campus diversity.

== In politics ==
=== Reconstruction ===
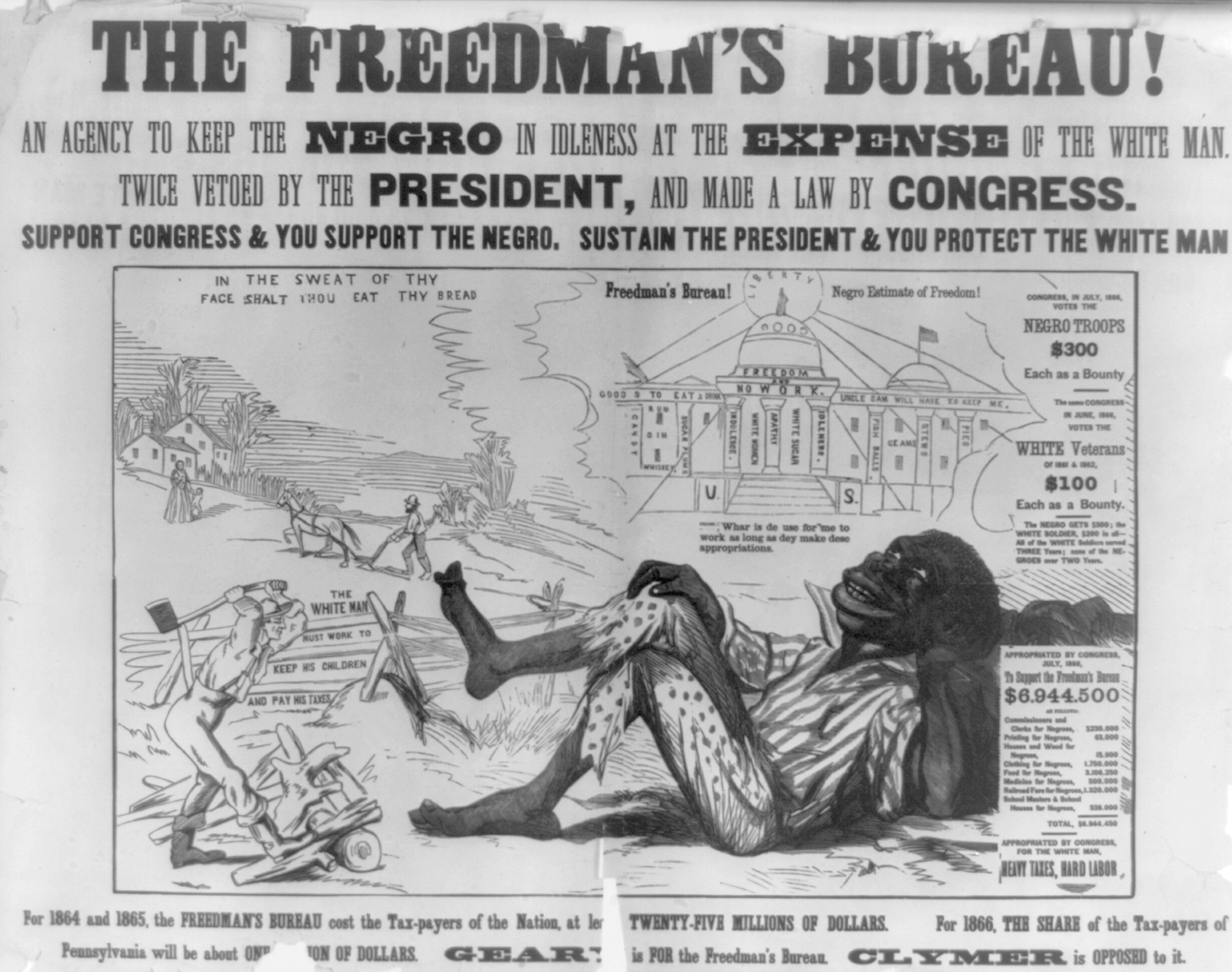
Ad protesting Reconstruction

After slavery was abolished, the government went through a series of changes that reflected the presence of new (black) citizens in the United States. Newly acquired freedom founded a growth in African-American participation in politics. This period of increased African-American participation, from 1867 to 1877, is known as Reconstruction. Despite the increase in African-American participation in politics, Reconstruction is not mentioned as an example of how black politics strive to be. There are very distinct viewpoints concerning this time period. Some believed that corruption had run rampant in the South with the introduction of newly freed slaves into legislatures, and a great deal of attention was given to the negativity that surrounded the introduction of black individuals into government. Reconstruction in South Carolina particularly was under scrutiny as the legislators were predominantly black. The happenings in the South Carolina legislature were described negatively and seen as pro-black and significantly focused on issues that only pertained to black people. Attention was solely focused on the misgivings occurring within the legislature, such as "unethical appropriation of state funds by members of the legislature" and other unethical or illegal acts committed by both black and white legislators in South Carolina. Another set of issues brought up was the multitude of expensive decorative items and embellishments that were purchased for the refurbishment of the State House. Whites were generally left out of the criticisms, despite their own contributions, and were referred to as victims of corruption due to the influence of black people.

Others believed that Reconstruction was not to blame for all corruption in legislation. This faction of people saw the constructive debates and conversations that flowed within the Southern legislatures. They were also more receptive to the positive aspects and characteristics of black legislators that were displayed during their time in office.

Despite the amount of eager participants, this period eventually led to a decline in black participation in politics. The backlash of those against increase of black participation in politics effectively began to cause the number of participants to stop and then decline. In the mid-20th century, despite past involvement, black participation in politics was low. Black participation was not a common occurrence in comparison to overall participation, and it was often celebrated when black candidates or politicians did particularly well in their political endeavors. This decline was attributed to a white counterattack of the Reconstruction movement. Many methods were used to dissuade black people from taking office. One of the most prominent was violence. An example of that would be the Ku Klux Klan, a secretive group whose members believed in white supremacy. The lynching, beatings, and intimidation of black people helped to hasten the decline of black participation in politics. Coercion was also another method used to dissuade black participation in politics, particularly voting. Threats of loss jobs and refusal of medical care are some of the coercion methods employed. Coercion did not play as big of a role as direct physical violence however it did serve to further hinder the growth of black participation in politics. These methods helped to forge a political system that has a scarce amount of minorities in office.

=== Representation ===
Black representation in Congress had been scarce, with fewer than eight blacks in Congress per Congressional periods since the end of the Civil War up until the Nixon era, when there were 11 black members of Congress (ten in the House and one in the Senate). After the 91st Congress, black representation began to increase, particularly among black Democrats.

=== In technology ===
Institutional racism's connections to technology have been an area that has not been sufficiently addressed. In her article "Race and Racism in Internet Studies", Jessie Daniels writes "the role of race in the development of Internet infrastructure and design has largely been obscured. As Sinclair observes, 'The history of race in America has been written as if technologies scarcely existed, and the history of technology as if it were utterly innocent of racial significance.'" Sociologist Ruha Benjamin writes further in her book Race After Technology: Abolitionist Tools for the New Jim Code that researchers "tend to concentrate on how the Internet perpetuates or mediates racial prejudice at the individual level rather than analyze how racism shapes infrastructure and design." Benjamin makes connections between institutional racism and racism in technology and notes the importance of future research on institutionalized racism in technology as well as the "technology of structural racism."

=== In the military ===
In June 2020, the U.S. Army instituted changes to its promotion policy to counteract institutional racism as part of its efforts to counter unconscious bias that caused black officer candidates to be passed over more often than were similarly qualified whites. For instance, photographs of candidates will no longer be part of their promotional packages, which had been found to hinder advancement opportunities for black soldiers.
