= 2008 Colorado Amendment 46 =

Amendment 46
- November 4, 2008
- Discrimination and Preferential Treatment by Governments

Results
Choice	Votes	%
Yes	1,102,046	49.19%
No	1,138,134	50.81%
Total votes	2,240,180	100.00%
County results
For
50–60%
Against
60–70%
50–60%

Amendment 46, also known as the Colorado Civil Rights Initiative, was a proposed initiative on the Colorado ballot for the state during the 2008 U.S general election. If ratified, Article II of the Colorado Constitution would have stated:

The State shall not discriminate against, or grant preferential treatment to, any individual or group on the basis of race, sex, color, ethnicity, or national origin in the operation of public employment, public education, or public contracting.

== Controversy ==
The proposed initiative was sponsored by Californian Ward Connerly. In April, 2008, a Colorado group sued, claiming that over 69,000 signatures on the ballot petition were invalid. Some citizens also claimed that they signed the petition through voter fraud.

Governor Bill Ritter opposed the amendment, along with the Colorado Council of Churches.

== Petition company ==
National Ballot Access was hired to manage this petition drive.

== Result ==
Amendment 46
Choice	Votes	%
For	1,102,046	49.19
Against	1,138,134	50.81
Total	2,240,180	100.00

== Aftermath ==
Initiatives with the same language have been introduced and approved in five other states, including California (1996), Washington (1998), Michigan (2006), Nebraska (2008), and Arizona (2010); Colorado was the first state where it was defeated. On December 17, 2010 the University of Colorado at Boulder released a report analyzing the factors that led to the defeat of Amendment 46. According to the study, "...Coloradans overwhelmingly intended to support affirmative action on Election Day; arguably, were Amendment 46 a clearly worded referendum on attitudes toward affirmative action, it would have failed by a much wider margin: 66 to 34 percent." The report also found that (a) many voters were confused by the initiative, (b) voters who followed the measure in the media were more likely to oppose it, and (c) proposed alternative initiatives in support of equal opportunity contributed to the measure's defeat.
