= Robert F. Utter =

American judge (1930–2014)

- Utter in 1972

Justice of the Washington Supreme Court
- In office December 20, 1971 – March 30, 1995
- Appointed by: Dan Evans
- Succeeded by: Rosselle Pekelis

Chief Justice of the Washington Supreme Court
- In office 1979 – 1981

Personal details
- Born: June 19, 1930 Seattle, Washington, U.S.
- Died: October 15, 2014 (aged 84) Olympia, Washington, U.S.
- Spouse: Betty Stevenson
- Children: 3
- Education: University of Washington (BA, LLB)

Robert French Utter (June 19, 1930 – October 15, 2014) was an American attorney and jurist from Washington. He served as a King County Superior Court judge from 1964 until his appointment to the Washington Court of Appeals in 1969. In 1971, he was appointed to the Washington Supreme Court, where he served for 23 years, including two years as the chief justice. Utter is known for his opposition to the death penalty. He dissented in two dozen cases on capital punishment while on the court and resigned in 1995 in protest of it. After resigning from the court, Utter taught the first state constitutional law course in Washington State at the University of Puget Sound School of Law and traveled around the world to help developing nations create independent judiciaries. He died in 2014.

== Early life and education ==
Utter was born in Seattle, Washington, on June 19, 1930, to Besse and John Utter. His mother died when he was six. He attended West Seattle High School where he participated in the YMCA's Youth Legislature program. Utter attended Linfield College before transferring to the University of Washington. He majored in political science and English literature, graduating with a bachelor's degree in 1951. He then earned his law degree from University of Washington School of Law in 1954. In 1958, Utter founded the Seattle chapter of Big Brothers, the first chapter in the state.

== Career ==
After graduating law school, Utter clerked for Justice Matthew Hill of the Washington Supreme Court from 1954 to 1955. He then joined the King County Prosecutors Office as a deputy prosecutor before going into private practice in 1957. From 1959 to 1964, he served as a court commissioner for the King County Superior Court before being elected to the court as a judge in 1964. In 1969, he was appointed to the Washington Court of Appeals by Governor Dan Evans.

In 1971, following the resignation of Justice Morell Edward Sharp, Evans appointed Utter to the Washington Supreme Court; he was sworn in on December 20, 1971, at the age of 41. Utter served for 23 years on the supreme court, including as chief justice from 1979 to 1981. Utter was 48 years old when he assumed the role of chief justice, making him at the time the youngest chief justice in the history of Washington State. That year, he was criticized by members of the Washington State Prosecuting Attorneys' Association as being overly "soft on crime". The prosecutors felt that Utter was too quick to throw court cases out on technicalities, letting "criminals go free". In 1978, Utter dissented from the majority opinion in State v. Riker, arguing evidence that Riker suffered from "battered woman syndrome" should have been admitted in the case. His dissent was characterized as "establish[ing] a battered woman’s right to self-defense" in The Seattle Times.

Utter's tenure was characterized by support of free speech and freedom of religion, funding education, the environment, social services, and youth programs. He also defended the “criteria approach” used by the supreme court in assessing states rights issues that conflicted with federal laws. Utter voted against a tort reform law and from 1983 to 1984 was involved in the Washington Public Power Supply System's nuclear projects, opining that the failed projects should be discussed in a courtroom. He published Survey of Washington Search and Seizure Law in 1985 and updated it in 1988. In 1987, he was a Distinguished Jurist-in-Residence at the Indiana University School of Law Indianapolis. In 1992, Utter advised on creating a criminal law code for the Central Tibetan Administration.

As a justice, Utter dissented in 24 of the 25 cases that came before the court where capital punishment was upheld. For instance, he considered the 1986 death sentence of Brian Keith Lord to be excessive. In 1994, Utter read Hitler's Justice by Inge Müller, a book profiling cases from the Weimar Republic, Nazi Germany, and West Germany and arguing for a continuity in the German judicial system. He later cited the book as one of the main reasons for his resignation, along with the execution of Westley Allan Dodd. Utter also felt that the death penalty was unfairly given to "poor and racial minorities".

On March 30, 1995, Utter wrote a letter to Governor Mike Lowry announcing that he was resigning from the court in protest of the death penalty, effective on April 24, 1995. In the letter, Utter wrote "I have reached the point where I can no longer participate in a legal system that intentionally takes human life" and that "[w]e continue to demonstrate no human is wise enough to decide who should die." (Note: In 2018, the Washington State Supreme Court declared that the death penalty was unconstitutional.) Lowry appointed Rosselle Pekelis to fill Utter's seat. In April, he wrote that he regretted failing "to provide equal access to justice" to all people in Washington. At the time of his resignation, The News Tribune wrote that Utter was "considered one of the nation's leading scholars on state constitutional issues and the notion that a state's civil rights laws take precedence over the federal Constitution". The Seattle Times wrote that the court lost "a jurist of the highest intellectual caliber" with Utter's resignation.

=== Electoral history ===
In Washington State, judges and supreme court justices are elected in nonpartisan races. After being appointed to the Washington Supreme Court, Utter was required to run in the next election in 1972. He then successfully ran for reelection when his term ended in 1974 and every six years thereafter until 1992. Since he received at least 50% of the vote in each of the primary elections, Utter was the only candidate to appear on the ballot for the general elections.

=== Later work ===
In the 1990s, Utter chaired the American Judicature Society, advocating for appointing judges based on merit rather than electing them. He also taught constitutional law at the University of Puget Sound School of Law, which was the first state constitutional law course taught in Washington State. In 1997, Utter led a task force in King County that resulted in the establishment of therapeutic courts focused on mental health. He wrote law review and magazine articles and a book about the Washington State Constitution. After resigning, he worked on a University of Washington project in Rwanda dealing with how courts tried to approach justice in the aftermath of the Rwandan genocide, including talking with members of the United Nations’ International Criminal Tribunal for Rwanda as part of a team in 2008.

Utter traveled around the world after working to help developing nations create independent judiciaries and was a member of the American Bar Association's Central European & Eurasian Law Initiative. His overseas work began in 1991 when Utter taught at the Russian Judicial Academy. With the American Bar Association's initiative, he taught about judiciary in Albania, advised Mongolia and Moldova, and was asked to help set up a constitutional court in Sarajevo. Utter also worked to develop a criminal code for the Commonwealth of Independent States, advised Kazakhstan on building an independent judiciary, and worked with Iraqi judges for three years. He also worked with the Rural Development Institute and was a pilot and an avid sailor. In 2009, Utter wrote an op-ed in The Seattle Times reaffirming his opposition to the death penalty, writing that "[r]etaining the death penalty fails to serve either justice, public safety or the public purse." After Governor Jay Inslee imposed a moratorium on state executions in 2014, Utter described it as an "overwhelming relief", saying that "all the past effort had not been wasted."

== Personal life ==
While a student at Linfield College, Utter dated Betty Stevenson. The two were married on December 28, 1953. Utter died at his home in Olympia, Washington, on October 15, 2014.

== Legacy ==
Utter has been linked to the rise of New Federalism, "a movement in which state supreme courts began to recognize that state constitutional rights provisions could be applied to provide more protection than recognized by the United States Supreme Court under the federal Constitution", due to his decisions on the supreme court and to his teachings on state constitutional law. Richard B. Sanders called him "the judge's judge". In 2016, Robert F. Williams wrote that "Taken together, Justice Utter's academic writings could have formed the basis for an influential book that would still be useful today in Washington and across the country." Charles W. Johnson said that "Utter's development of an independent interpretation of the State Constitution was probably as strong an influence on this court as could have been achieved by any individual".

In 1997, the YMCA Youth and Government program in Washington named its highest award after him. The "Robert F. Utter Award" is presented to individuals who "show consistent, outstanding and sustained contributions to the cause of civic leadership in Washington." Utter was the first recipient of the award.

== Notes ==
Political offices
Preceded by Morell Edward Sharp	Justice of the Washington Supreme Court; 1971–1995	Succeeded by Rosselle Pekelis
