= Ward Connerly =

American political activist and businessman (born 1939)

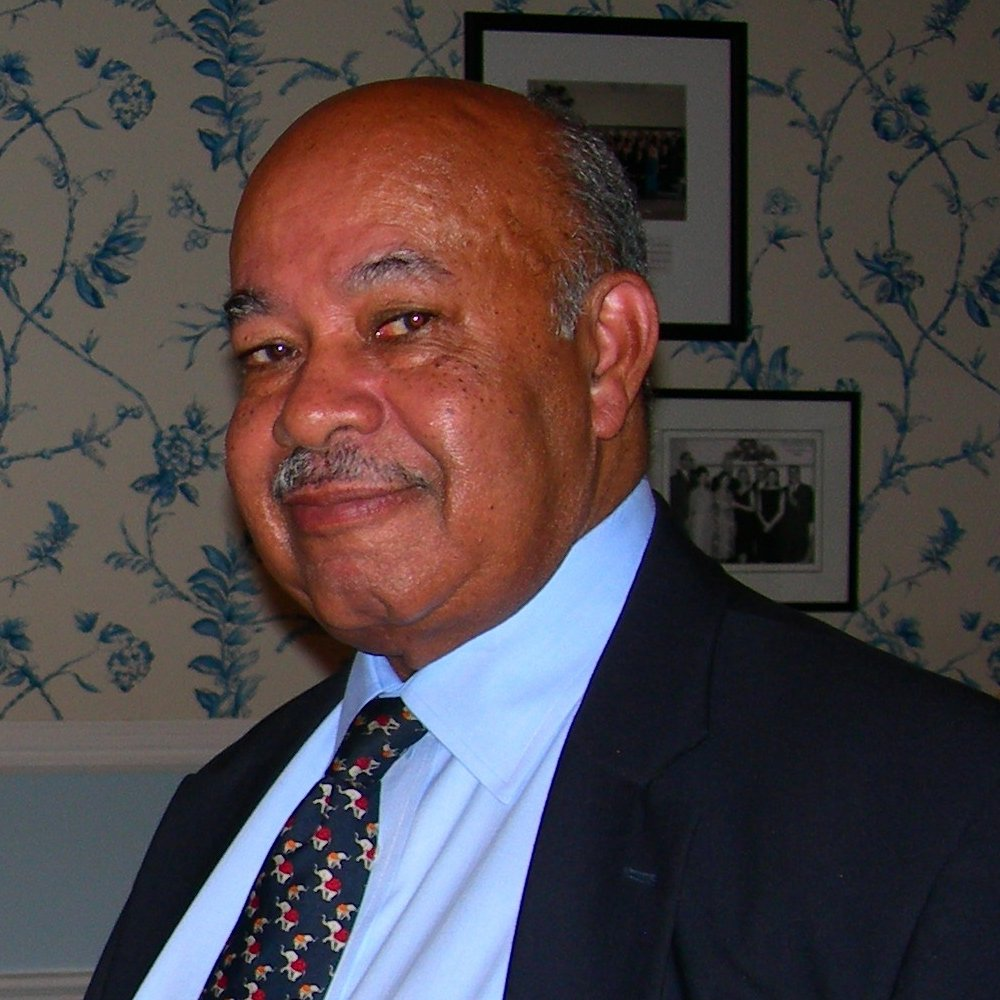
- Born: Wardell Anthony Connerly; June 15, 1939 (age 87); Leesville, Louisiana, U.S.
- Education: California State University, Sacramento (BA)
- Known for: California's Proposition 209; Michigan Civil Rights Initiative
- Political party: Republican
- Spouse: Ilene Crews (m. 1962)
- Children: 2

Wardell Anthony "Ward" Connerly (born June 15, 1939) is an American political and anti-affirmative action activist, businessman, and former member of the Regents of the University of California (1993–2005). He is also the founder and the chairman of the American Civil Rights Institute, a national non-profit organization in opposition to racial and gender preferences, and is the president of Californians for Equal Rights, a non-profit organization active in the state of California with a similar mission. He is considered to be the man behind California's Proposition 209 prohibiting race- and gender-based preferences in state hiring, contracting and state university admissions, a program known as affirmative action.

== Early life ==
Wardell Anthony Connerly was born in Leesville, Louisiana, in 1939. Connerly has said that he is one-fourth black and half-white, with the rest a mix of Irish, French, and Choctaw American Indian. He identifies as multiracial. He grew up in an African-American community, but the children met some discrimination in school because of their light skin. In a Louisiana state census, the family were classified as "colored", a category that historically covered the Louisiana Creole people (other categories were negro and white). His father, Roy Connerly, left the household when Ward was 2, and his mother died when he was 4. The young Connerly lived first with Bertha and James Louis, his maternal aunt and uncle. They moved to Bremerton, Washington and then to Sacramento, California, as part of the Great Migration by millions of blacks out of the South in the first half of the 20th century to seek better opportunities. Connerly next lived with his maternal grandmother, Mary Smith Soneia, who had also moved to Sacramento. (She was the daughter of a Choctaw man and white woman, and she had married a Cajun of mixed heritage.) When she had difficulty supporting the two of them, Ward took many jobs as a boy.

Connerly attended Sacramento State College, where he earned a Bachelor of Arts with honors in political science in 1962. While in college, Connerly was student body president, was active as a Young Democrat, and joined Delta Phi Omega, a white fraternity. Later he was made an honorary member of Sigma Phi Epsilon fraternity. During his college years, Connerly campaigned against housing discrimination and helped to get a bill passed by the state legislature banning the practice.

== Marriage and family ==
Since 1962, Connerly has been married to Ilene Crews, a woman of European-American descent, whom he started dating in college. They have two children. She is his equal partner in the firm of Connerly & Associates.

In addition to his political activities, Connerly is a member of the Rotary Club of Sacramento, California.

== Campaign against racial preferences ==
After his appointment to the University of California board of regents in 1993, Connerly began to learn more about the workings of its affirmative action program. In 1994, he heard from Jerry and Ellan Cook, whose son had been rejected at the UCSF School of Medicine. Connerly became convinced that affirmative action, as practiced by UC, was another kind of racial discrimination. Cook, a statistician, had presented data showing that white and Asian students were being denied admission despite having better grades and test scores than other students who were being admitted. Connerly proposed abolishing the controversial racially based programs, while allowing the university to consider social or economic factors. The regents passed the proposal in January 1996 despite protests from activist Jesse Jackson and other supporters of affirmative action. The year after affirmative action was abolished, the number of Asian students admitted to UC increased markedly.

The UC regents developed a new system, including essay requirements that served to reveal the applicant's race and ethnicity. The new measures, titled "comprehensive review" have not yet been challenged to the California Supreme Court or the Supreme Court of the United States.

In 1995, Connerly became the chairman of the California Civil Rights Initiative Campaign and helped get the initiative on the California ballot as Proposition 209. The Carnegie, Ford, and Rockefeller Foundations, the ACLU, and the California Teachers Association opposed the measure. It passed with 54.6% of the vote.

In 1997, Connerly formed the American Civil Rights Institute. ACRI supported a similar ballot measure in Washington state, Initiative 200, which would later pass with 58.2% of the vote. Connerly had a salary of $314,079 combined from the ACRI and American Civil Rights Coalition in addition to over $400,000 in speaking and consulting fees in 2002; nearly half of his salary reimbursed his Connerly & Associates land and housing consulting firm.

ACRI worked to get a measure on the ballot in the 2000 Florida election. The Florida Supreme Court put restrictions on the petition language. Though Governor Jeb Bush, like the previous governor, opposed the petition as a public initiative, Bush sympathized with its key goals. Bush eventually proposed a program "One Florida" which implemented key portions of Connerly's proposal.

In 2003, Connerly helped place Proposition 54 on the California ballot, which would prohibit the government from classifying any person by race, ethnicity, color, or national origin, with some exceptions, such as for medical research. Critics were concerned that such a measure would make it difficult to track housing discrimination and racial profiling activities. Editorials in newspapers such as the San Francisco Chronicle and Los Angeles Times criticized the measure, saying that the lack of such information would hamper legitimate medical and scientific purposes. The voters did not pass the measure.

In 2003 the Supreme Court ruled on affirmative action programs at the University of Michigan in Gratz v. Bollinger and Grutter v. Bollinger; it ruled the undergraduate affirmative action program was unconstitutional for the way it applied the program, but that the process at the University of Michigan law school could continue. Jennifer Gratz invited Connerly to Michigan to support a referendum measure similar to the 1996 California amendment. The Michigan Civil Rights Initiative appeared on the November 2006 Michigan ballot and was passed 58% to 42%.

For the 2008 elections, Connerly headed a campaign which he called "Super Tuesday for Equal Rights". It was directed at dismantling affirmative action programs in five different states via ballot measures. In three of the states, Connerly's initiatives failed to make it onto the ballot. In Colorado, voters rejected Amendment 46 (or the Colorado Civil Rights Initiative) by a very slim margin. Voters in Nebraska were the only ones to approve a new anti-affirmative action measure, called Initiative 424.

For the 2020 election, Connerly organized the coalition opposing Proposition 16, which would have removed the sections added to the California constitution after Proposition 209 was approved by the voters in 1996. A victory for Proposition 16 would make it legal for the state to give preferences and discriminate based on protected classes like race, sex, color, ethnicity, or national origin. 57% of the votes cast in the election opposed Proposition 16, and it failed to pass. The 57.2% vote against Proposition 16, implies that more Californians support race neutrality than they did in 1996, when Proposition 209 passed with 54.6% votes.

== Political views ==
=== Party identification ===
Ward Connerly identifies as a Republican with a libertarian philosophy. In January 2008, Connerly endorsed Republican presidential candidate Rudy Giuliani.

More recently, Connerly has said he supports Donald Trump and MAGA. In a 2020 interview with EdSource, Connerly praised Trump as the nation’s first truly “color-blind” president, described white nationalists as “super patriots,” and said he feared an increased exodus of whites from California if affirmative action returned.

=== Support for domestic partnership benefits ===
Despite his close political relationship with former California Governor Pete Wilson, and their agreement on the question of affirmative action, Connerly led efforts to grant domestic partner benefits to gay and lesbian domestic partners in all state universities over Wilson's objections. The UC Regents narrowly passed the initiative.

Connerly says his views on gay rights stem from his libertarian viewpoint that governments, including government-run universities, should not discriminate, whether it is by favoring some students because of their race, or by excluding others from spousal benefits based on their sexual orientation.

The conservative advocacy groups Family Research Council and Traditional Values Coalition criticized Connerly's support for domestic partner benefits. In reference to Connerly, Robert H. Knight, Director of Cultural Studies at the Family Research Council, said, "no true conservative would equate homosexual households with marriages, because we believe that without marriage and family as paramount values, hell will break loose."

=== Support of same-sex marriage ===
In response to Proposition 8 on California's November 2008 ballot that would ban same-sex marriage in California, Connerly stated, "For anyone to say that this is an issue for people who are gay and that this isn't about civil rights is sadly mistaken. If you really believe in freedom and limited government, to be intellectually consistent and honest you have to oppose efforts of the majority to impose their will on people."

=== Support of multi-racial category on government forms ===
On July 9, 1997, the American Civil Rights Institute expressed disappointment with the federal government's decision to reject the addition of a multi-racial category on the Census and other government forms that collect racial data. Since 2000, the Census Bureau has allowed individuals to identify more than one racial/ethnic category on the census form, although it does not yet have a multiracial category.

Connerly began to ally with prominent members of what has become known as the multiracial movement. Prior to leading the Racial Privacy Initiative (Proposition 54) in California, Connerly forged ties with the publishers of Interracial Voice and The Multiracial Activist, prominent publications for the multiracial movement. Eventually, Connerly enlisted the help of several outspoken members of the multiracial movement to assist with the campaign for the Racial Privacy Initiative.

== Reception ==
=== Personal ===
In 1995, then California State Senator (and later congresswoman) Diane Watson said about Connerly, "He's married to a white woman. He wants to be white. He wants a colorless society. He has no ethnic pride. He doesn't want to be black." Jeff Jacoby, a columnist for The Boston Globe, characterized this attack as part of the personal abuse conservative blacks received from liberal blacks who opposed their programs.

External videos
- Booknotes interview with Connerly on Creating Equal, April 30, 2000, C-SPAN

After Connerly published his autobiography, Creating Equal: My Fight Against Race Preferences in 2000, some relatives claimed his accounts of an impoverished childhood were exaggerated or false. Connerly's aunt Bertha Louis, whom he had lived with and who was close to his grandmother, confirmed his account and said his detractors "are just lyin' on him. It's jealousy and it's hatred, as low as you can get."

=== Affirmative action and desegregation ===
Asked in 2003 if Proposition 54 could derail school integration efforts in California, Connerly said: "I don't care whether they are segregated or not… kids need to be learning, and I place more value on these kids getting educated than I do on whether we have some racial balancing or not."

Connerly's opposition to affirmative action has generated both opposition and support. Connerly believes affirmative action is a form of racism and that people can achieve success without preferential treatment in college enrollment or in employment. He thinks that selective affirmative action discriminates against minorities such as Asian Indians and South East Asians, as some of their people have experienced discrimination in the past, but they do not receive the benefits of race-based admissions. Critics contend Connerly fails to recognize the damaging extent of past racism for African Americans and Hispanics, that contemporary institutionalized racism is pervasive and powerful, and that affirmative action can overcome the residual effects of past discrimination on people of color.

In 1995, the San Francisco Chronicle reported that as CEO of Connerly & Associates, Inc., Connerly benefited financially from state affirmative action programs in contracting.

BAMN opposed Connerly's efforts to put the Michigan Civil Rights Initiative on the 2006 Michigan Ballot, and disrupted a Michigan Board of Canvassers meeting that year in protest.

In relation to Attacking Affirmative Action, a program on Now on PBS in August 2008, Connerly said,

I think that in some quarters, many parts of the country, a white male is really disadvantaged… Because we have developed this notion of women and minorities being so disadvantaged and we have to help them, that we have, in many cases, twisted the thing so that it's no longer a case of equal opportunity. It's a case of putting a fist on the scale.

== Legacy and honors ==
- He published an autobiography Creating Equal: My Fight Against Race Preference in 2000, ISBN 978-1594032189
- He was made an honorary member of Sigma Phi Epsilon, a fraternity founded at the University of Richmond in 1901.
- Connerly was inducted as a lifetime member into the California Building Industry Hall of Fame.
