= Rosselle Pekelis =

Former Washington Supreme Court judge

- Rosselle Pekelis, from a 1978 newspaper

Justice of the Washington Supreme Court
- In office 1995
- Preceded by: Robert F. Utter
- Succeeded by: Richard B. Sanders

Judge of the King County Superior Court
- In office 1981–1986

Personal details
- Born: 1938 Florence, Kingdom of Italy
- Died: December 9, 2019 (aged 81) Seattle, Washington, U.S.
- Children: 4
- Education: Stephens College (BA); University of Missouri (LLB)

Rosselle Pekelis (1938 – December 9, 2019) was an Italian-born American attorney and jurist who served as a Judge of the Washington Supreme Court. She previously served as a judge on the King County Superior Court from 1981 to 1986, the Court of Appeals from 1986 to 1995, and the Supreme Court in 1995 to fill a vacancy.

== Early life and education ==
Pekelis was born in Florence, Italy, and raised in Larchmont, New York, to a family of Italian Jews who escaped France during the Nazi Germany invasion of 1940. She earned a Bachelor of Arts degree from Stephens College and a Bachelor of Laws from the University of Missouri School of Law.

== Career ==
Pekelis was appointed to the King County Superior Court by Dixy Lee Ray, and later re-elected to that position. While there, she was widely noted for a humorous incident in which she asked a police officer in her court who was chewing gum to throw it away. The officer misunderstood her and began to place his gun in the wastebasket.

Booth Gardner appointed Pekelis to the Washington Court of Appeals, a position to which she was also later re-elected; in total, she served on that court for nine years. Pekelis was appointed to the Washington Supreme Court by Mike Lowry in April 1995 to fill a seat left empty by the departure of Robert Utter. Major cases of hers include a 1992 Court of Appeals ruling that gender-based peremptory challenges violated the Equal Rights Amendment to the Washington Constitution as well as the United States Constitution, as well as a 1995 Supreme Court ruling for the adequacy of existing implied consent warnings given to drunken driving suspects before they took breathalyzer tests.

In her re-election race in November 1995, Pekelis faced Richard B. Sanders, a local land use attorney. Sanders defeated her in the election by about 53% to 47%. Seattle Times columnist Terry Tang decried Sanders' campaign as "boorishly partisan" and wrote that the departure of "an excellent judge like Rosselle Pekelis" would likely fuel further distrust of the judiciary. The race was later analyzed as the start of a trend towards increasing politicization of judicial elections.

After her election defeat, Pekelis joined the Seattle Ethics and Elections Commission in 1996 and formed a mediation firm with other former area judges in 1997.

== Personal life ==
Both her husband and ex-husband practiced law in the Seattle area. She had four children. Pekelis died on December 9, 2019, three months after she was diagnosed with glioblastoma multiforme.
