= Michigan Civil Rights Initiative =

American ballot initiative

Proposal 2
- A proposal to amend the state constitution to ban affirmative action programs that give preferential treatment to groups or individuals based on their race, gender, color, ethnicity or national origin for public employment, education or contracting purposes.

Results
Choice	Votes	%
Yes	2,141,010	57.92%
No	1,555,691	42.08%
Total votes	3,696,701	100.00%
County results
Yes
70–80%
60–70%
50–60%
No
50–60%

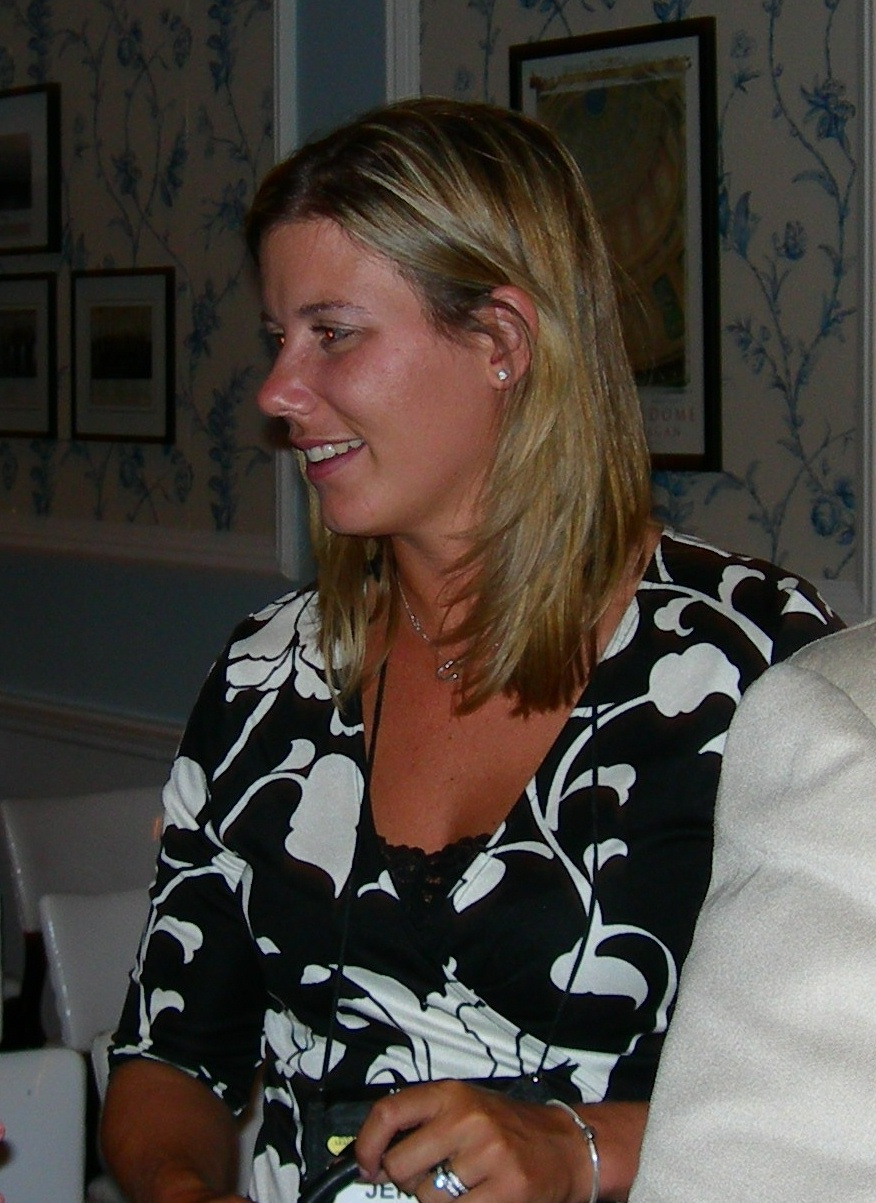
MCRI's executive director Jennifer Gratz

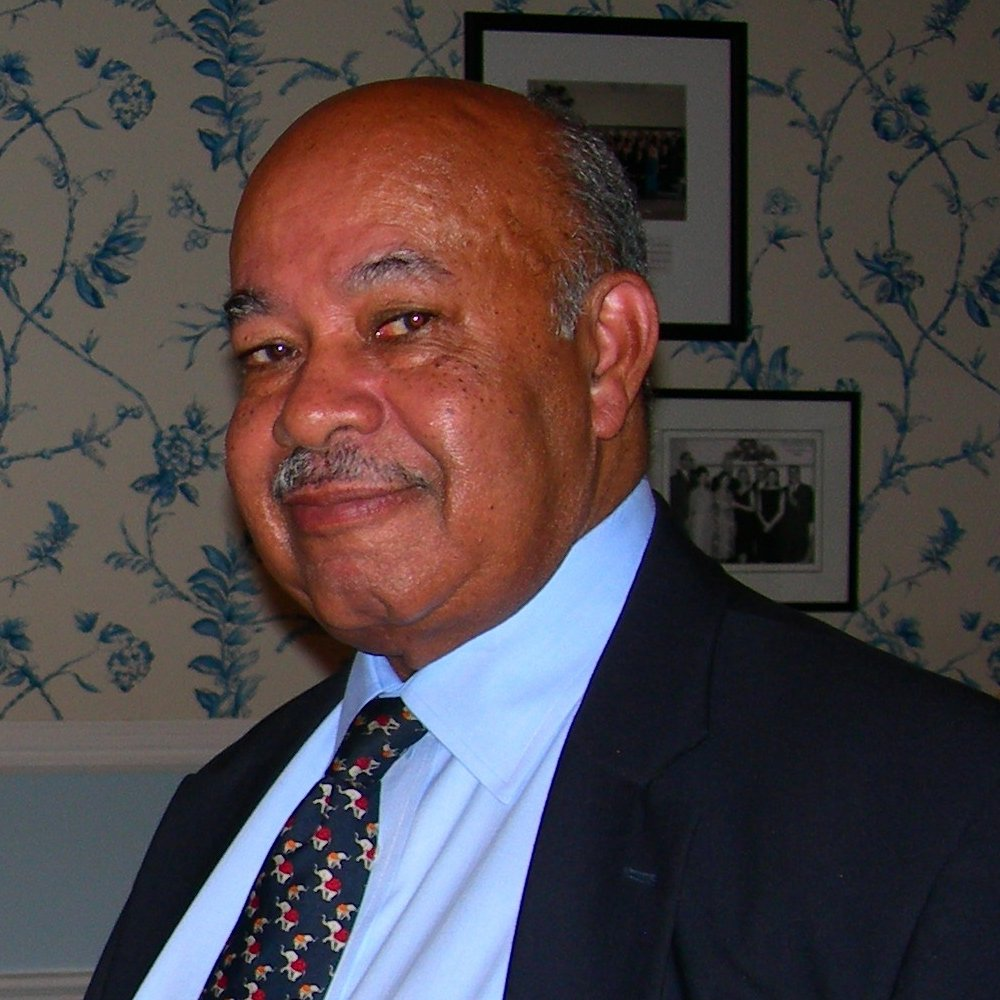
Ward Connerly

The Michigan Civil Rights Initiative (MCRI), or Proposal 2 (Michigan 06–2), was a ballot initiative in the U.S. state of Michigan that passed into Michigan Constitutional law by a 58% to 42% margin on November 7, 2006, according to results officially certified by the Michigan Secretary of State. By Michigan law, the Proposal became law on December 22, 2006. MCRI was a citizen initiative aimed at banning consideration of race, color, sex, or religion in admission to colleges, jobs, and other publicly funded institutions – effectively prohibiting some affirmative action by public institutions based on those factors. The Proposal's constitutionality was challenged in federal court, but its constitutionality was ultimately upheld by the Supreme Court of the United States.

== Summary of Court challenges ==
On 21 March 2008, Judge David M. Lawson of the United States District Court for the Eastern District of Michigan dismissed a case filed by plaintiffs challenging the constitutionality of Proposal 2. Judge Lawson held that Proposal 2 does not violate the United States Constitution.

The United States Court of Appeals for the Sixth Circuit overturned MCRI on July 1, 2011. Judges R. Guy Cole Jr. and Martha Craig Daughtrey said that "Proposal 2 reorders the political process in Michigan to place special burdens on minority interests." Michigan Attorney General Bill Schuette said he would appeal the court ruling.

Bill Schuette, Attorney General for the State of Michigan announced his appeal of the Sixth Circuit's decision on July 28, 2011. The MCRI stood in effect until this appeal was complete.

On November 16, 2012, the Sixth Circuit Court of Appeals, sitting en banc, upheld the earlier ruling that the MCRI was unconstitutional. Schuette then announced his intention to appeal to the Supreme Court. The Supreme Court of the United States granted certiorari in Schuette v. Coalition to Defend Affirmative Action on March 25, 2013. The Court heard arguments in the case on October 15, 2013, and the Court ruled on April 22, 2014 "that there is no authority ... for the judiciary to set aside Michigan laws that commit to the voters the determination whether racial preferences may be considered in governmental decisions, in particular with respect to school decisions." Thereby upholding the Constitutionality of the amendment.

== Text of the Amendment ==
The ballot initiative amended the Michigan Constitution to include a new section (Section 26 of Article I):

Affirmative action programs.

1. The University of Michigan, Michigan State University, Wayne State University, and any other public college or university, community college, or school district shall not discriminate against, or grant preferential treatment to, any individual or group on the basis of race, sex, color, ethnicity, or national origin in the operation of public employment, public education, or public contracting.
2. The state shall not discriminate against, or grant preferential treatment to, any individual or group on the basis of race, sex, color, ethnicity, or national origin in the operation of public employment, public education, or public contracting.
3. For the purposes of this section "state" includes, but is not necessarily limited to, the state itself, any city, county, any public college, university, or community college, school district, or other political subdivision or governmental instrumentality of or within the State of Michigan not included in sub-section 1.
4. This section does not prohibit action that must be taken to establish or maintain eligibility for any federal program if ineligibility would result in a loss of federal funds to the state.
5. Nothing in this section shall be interpreted as prohibiting bona fide qualifications based on sex that are reasonably necessary to the normal operation of public employment, public education, or public contracting.
6. The remedies available for violations of this section shall be the same, regardless of the injured party's race, sex, color, ethnicity, or national origin, as are otherwise available for violations of Michigan anti-discrimination law.
7. This section shall be self-executing. If any part or parts of this section are found to be in conflict with the United States Constitution or federal law, the section shall be implemented to the maximum extent that the United States Constitution and federal law permit. Any provision held invalid shall be severable from the remaining portions of this section.
8. This section applies only to action taken after the effective date of this section.
9. This section does not invalidate any court order or consent decree that is in force as of the effective date of this section.

== Background ==
The subject of the proposal has been hotly debated, with the very definition of what it encompasses at the center of the controversy. Proponents argue that it bans programs in public hiring, public employment, and public education that "give preferential treatment to" or "discriminate against" individuals on the basis of race, gender, ethnicity, or national origin. Opponents argue that Proposal 2 bans all affirmative action programs in the operation of public employment, education, or contracting.

Proponents cite the 1964 Civil Rights Act and the "Equal Protection" clause of the 14th Amendment that forbids the United States or any state from denying "equal protection of the law" to any citizen as models for the proposal. It is a near copy of similar initiatives passed in California (Proposition 209) and Washington (Initiative 200).

In 2004, when the first attempt was made to place the measure on the ballot, Gregory Creswell was MCRI spokesperson, volunteer coordinator, and an organizer. In a pre-kick-off announcement, he articulated some reasons he was working for the amendment: "I believe it is wrong for the government and politicians to dictate to an employer who they must or must not hire, just as I believe Jim Crow is immoral and just as I believe apartheid in South Africa was immoral," said Creswell.

At the petition kick-off meeting affirmative action advocate Rev. Horace Sheffield III clashed with Creswell after being denied entry to the event. Creswell's rivalry with Sheffield dated back to 2000 when Creswell criticized a protest outside the Detroit Police headquarters, following a couple shootings of suspects by police.

After some early court challenges, a state appeals court permitted MCRI petitioners to continue gathering signatures, but the effort was postponed till the 2006 cycle due to time constraints.

During the early debate about the proposal shortly following the collection of signatures (508,282 submitted January 6, 2005), the Michigan Civil Rights Commission, a governmental body charged with investigating civil rights violations in the state of Michigan, concluded an investigation of MCRI and asserted that supporters of the MCRI had committed widespread and systematic racially targeted fraud in their petition campaign to secure ballot access. The proponents of the initiative issued a multi-page refutation of the report, including a notation that it was never signed by the commission and alleging misconduct by the Commission itself.

In September 2006, after opponents filed a federal lawsuit against the MCRI alleging fraud in the collection of petition signatures, a federal judge in Detroit found that some voter fraud had in fact taken place but denied an injunction to have the initiative barred.

== First federal lawsuit against MCRI ==
Oral arguments in a federal lawsuit charging MCRI and the State of Michigan with violating the Voting Rights Act of 1965 were heard on August 17, 2006, with attorneys presenting their closing arguments on the morning of August 18, 2006. The case was heard by U.S. District Court Judge Arthur Tarnow, who promised to rule on the matter by September 8, 2006, to give officials enough time to print up the ballot. During the first day of the hearing, hundreds of protesters picketed outside the courthouse chanting among other things, "Racist fraud, hell no! MCRI has got to go!" The lawsuit was filed by Operation King's Dream, Detroit Mayor Kwame Kilpatrick, Detroit City Council, American-Arab Anti Discrimination Committee, Michigan Legislative Black Caucus, Keep the Vote No Takeover, AFSCME Locals 207, 312, and 2920, and UAW 2200 as well as several individual voters. Michigan Governor Jennifer Granholm submitted an amicus brief in support of the plaintiffs.

On August 29, 2006, the case was decided with Judge Tarnow, a Democratic judicial appointee, refusing to remove the initiative from the ballot. However, Judge Tarnow declared that "MCRI engaged in systematic voter fraud by telling voters that were signing a petition supporting affirmative action." However, because the case was not decided on these grounds, this statement is legally characterized as "dicta"—judicial commentary that is not relevant to the outcome of a case. Tarnow also found the testimony of Jennifer Gratz (MCRI's executive director) in the court to be evasive and misleading. His stated reason for refusing an injunction to remove the MCRI from the ballot was the MCRI "targeted all Michigan voters for deception without regard to race." He ruled that the Voting Rights Act was not violated because it "is not a general anti-voter fraud statute, but rather prohibits practices which result in unequal access to the political process because of race."

Luke Massie, national co-chair of the Coalition to Defend Affirmative Action, Integration, and Immigrant Rights & Fight for Equality By Any Means Necessary (BAMN) announced that the plaintiffs would appeal Tarnow's decision to the U.S. 6th Circuit Court of Appeals, saying "It makes no sense to conclude there was fraud and allow the vote to go forward." The 6th Circuit rejected the appeal in mid-September.

== Voting and poll results ==
On November 27, 2006, Proposal 2 was certified officially by the Michigan Secretary of State to have passed by a margin of 58% to 42% (2,141,010 "Yes" votes to 1,555,691 "No" votes). The last reported poll of October 15, by The Detroit News, showed MCRI to have up to a 50–41% lead. In another Free Press—Local 4 Michigan poll conducted by Selzer & Co. Inc. of Des Moines between October 8 to October 11 of 643 likely voters, it was shown that 41% were in favor of the MCRI, while 44% opposed the measure, and 15% of the voter poll were undecided. The poll had a margin of error of 3.9% making the poll a statistical dead-heat. Another poll, from mid-September 2006, showed MCRI was up 48–37 with 15% undecided, with the pollster admitting that his previous polls had not used the exact language of the proposal until the September poll. The entire polling process highlighted an ongoing debate about the scientific value of modern phone polling on questions of race or controversial social issues where the polled members of the public may be "embarrassed" by social desirability bias to give a truthful response about their intended vote for fear that the interviewer will judge them.

== Board of Canvassers meeting ==
In July 2005, the Michigan State Board of Canvassers declined to certify the MCRI proposal for Michigan's November 2006 ballot after hearing allegations that a significant number of signatures were obtained by telling supporters of affirmative action that the petition was likewise, in support of affirmative action. Counter-allegations were made by MCRI supporters that the allegations were fabricated and that the Board of Canvassers' decision-process itself was being improperly influenced by politics because Michigan Democratic Party Chairman Mark Brewer was "giving orders" to the two members of the Board appointed by Democrats, and backed up by the linked videotape shot by MCRI Treasurer and publisher Chetly Zarko. Despite the deadlocked vote by the Canvassers and their inability to certify the petition as a result, in October of the same year the Michigan Court of Appeals ordered the board to certify the petitions.

On December 14, 2005, in Lansing, Michigan, while attempting to comply with that court order to certify the petitions, the board's four members were scheduled to make the final vote to certify the petitions for the November ballot. However, the meeting attended by hundreds of Detroit high school students. The crowd began to shout "No voter fraud," until they became so loud that the members left the room adjourning until 2pm. Chanting, "They say Jim Crow! We say hell no!," the emotion-surged crowd of students continued until a table was overturned in the commotion and the Lansing police came in to control the situation. Opponents of MCRI labeled their own conduct civil disobedience while proponents argued it crossed the line into outright violence and intentional intimidation. Video of the situation can be seen here.

After the protest, the election panel again failed to certify the petitions with a vote of 2–1, falling short of the required three votes. Republican board members Katherine Degrow and Lyn Banks voted in favor with Democrats Paul Mitchell voting no and Doyle O'Connor not voting.

The meeting received considerable media attention because of the protest. In the months following the controversial board meeting, Mitchell resigned from the board and O'Connor was charged with contempt of court; however the charges were dismissed after O'Connor sought disclosure of improper communications between the chief judge and the Republican leadership of the Legislature. O'Connor later testified against the MCRI at the August 17 federal court hearing, relaying how he had witnessed two African-American women circulating the anti-affirmative action petition in Detroit telling signers that it was in support of affirmative action.

== "Preferential Treatment" ==
Proponents of the MCRI claim that the initiative will make illegal only those programs and policies, affecting university admissions, public employment, and contracting, that grant "preferential treatment" based on gender, race, or ethnicity. These claims were disputed by some opponents who cite California's Proposition 209, alleging that the language of that proposal outlawed "all affirmative action policies" and programs, and MCRI's language is nearly identical. Proponents counter this argument by arguing that while MCRI is nearly identical to California's amendment, neither MCRI or 209 outlawed "all" or any "affirmative action." They point to programs such as California's use of socio-economic indicators, outreach targeted at the 150 lowest scoring high schools, and traditional anti-discrimination enforcement as some among many race-neutral types of "affirmative action". On March 7, 2007, however, the Michigan Civil Rights Commission, which had previously fought against Proposal 2, issued a report at the behest of the Governor, taking the position that Proposal 2 did not eliminate "all" affirmative action. In their summary of a 63-page report, Linda Parker, chair of the commission, now agreed with Proposal 2 advocates, "With this Report, the Commission and Department confirm that Proposal 2 does not mean the end of equal opportunity or diversity in Michigan,". The Report explicitly cites the difference between "preferential treatment" and "affirmative action". Proponent of Proposal 2, Chetly Zarko, argued that this "flip-flop" by the Commission not only proved MCRI was correct all along about the legal issues and difference, but that it disproved the commission's report alleging "fraud" in signature-collection since the commission had previously alleged in its June 2006 fraud-allegation report that petitioners should have used the words "affirmative action" in their presentation..

== Post-election ==
Several groups have challenged the constitutional amendment since its passage.

On November 8, 2006, BAMN called a press conference announcing that they had launched a second lawsuit against Proposal 2 in conjunction with United for Equality and Affirmative Action and Rainbow/PUSH Coalition, claiming that it violates both the Equal Protection clause of the Fourteenth Amendment and the First Amendment as affirmed by the Supreme Court decision, Grutter v. Bollinger.

That same day, about 2,000 students gathered on the diag at the University of Michigan where University President Mary Sue Coleman gave a speech in which she promised U-M would go to court to defend its efforts to promote diversity, despite the majority of Michigan’s electorate voting against affirmative action. Two weeks later, on November 21, Grand Rapids Mayor George Heartwell said he was considering having the city file a federal lawsuit to overturn Proposal 2.

On December 19, U.S. District Court Judge David Lawson ruled that the state's three largest public universities—the University of Michigan, Michigan State University, and Wayne State University—could delay implementation of Proposal until July 1, 2007. The universities had filed a lawsuit seeking the delay, charging fairness in admissions, in response to BAMN's lawsuit in which all three universities were named as defendants. The Center for Individual Rights has asked the U.S. Sixth Circuit Court of Appeals to overturn Judge Lawson's ruling and force the universities to adhere to this amendment, to the Michigan Constitution, immediately.

On December 29, a 3-judge panel of the 6th US Circuit Court of Appeals lifted Judge Lawson's injunction granting the 3 universities the July 1 implementation delay and ordered them to implement Proposal 2 immediately.

The city of Lansing has also filed a lawsuit to delay implementation of Prop 2 until July 2007. In Detroit, Matt Allen, a spokesman for Mayor Kwame Kilpatrick said the city illegally "will continue doing business as it has been" in spite of the passage of the statewide initiative.

Another lawsuit has been filed in federal court by the NAACP and the ACLU to block the Michigan Civil Rights Initiative.

On January 4, 2007, the Center for Individual Rights filed a lawsuit in Washtenaw Circuit Court, asking a judge to order the University of Michigan to immediately comply with Proposal 2, and abandon their affirmative action programs. The case was resolved on January 29 when Eric Russell, whom the Center for Individual Rights was representing voluntarily withdrew the lawsuit.

Jan. 9–10: BAMN held a press conference at Cass Tech High School in Detroit announcing that their appeal of the Federal Appeals Court decision overturning the delay of the ban on affirmative action. The next day, after placing holds on admissions, the University of Michigan announced that they will comply with the ban on affirmative action. Hours later, Supreme Court Justice John Paul Stevens responded to BAMN's appeal of the 6th U.S. Circuit Court of Appeals decision overturning the delay of Proposal 2's implementation and ordered all briefs due by January 17. U-M, Wayne State, MSU, and Michigan Governor Jennifer Granholm all filed briefs in support. Michigan Attorney General Mike Cox urged Stevens to deny the injunction. On January 19, the Supreme Court denied BAMN's appeal without comment.

On Thursday, February 15, BAMN submitted 2,000 petitions to the Board of Regents of the University of Michigan demanding that there be no drop in minority enrollment. The following Tuesday, on February 20, the Michigan Student Assembly, the elected student government of U-M passed a resolution demanding that there be no drop in underrepresented minority student enrollment.

On Friday, July 1, 2011, the Federal Sixth Circuit Court of Appeals held the amendment unconstitutional on the grounds that it "reorders the political process in Michigan to place special burdens on minority interests," and thus violates the 14th Amendment. Attorney General Bill Schuette then announced that he would appeal the ruling and ask to have the case re-heard "en banc," by all active judges rather than a panel of three.

On Thursday, November 3, 2011, the Equal Justice Society and more than a dozen other organizations announced that they had filed an amicus brief in the U.S. Court of Appeals for the Sixth Circuit, urging the court to strike down Michigan's Proposal 2 as unconstitutional. The brief authors argue that Proposal 2 violates the Equal Protection Clause of the 14th Amendment of the Constitution by creating procedural barriers for people of color.

On 16 November 2012, the Sixth Circuit Court of Appeals sitting en banc upheld the earlier ruling that the Initiative is unconstitutional. Supporters announced their intention to appeal to the Supreme Court.

On March 25, 2013, the Supreme Court granted a writ of certiorari, agreeing to hear the case. Arguments were heard during the Supreme Court term beginning in October 2013.

On April 22, 2014, the Supreme Court of the United States upheld the Michigan Civil Rights Initiative as Constitutional.

== Effects ==
On Friday, February 16, 2007, the University of Michigan released admissions data showing that, in a period that includes the time after Proposal 2 was implemented, minority admissions of primarily lower test scores declined 25% from the same period a year before. The data also show that in the period immediately before Proposal 2 was implemented, minority admissions was up 55% from the same period in 2006. A spokeswoman for the university, Julie Peterson, has said that since the numbers aren't final and since so many minority students applied early, the drop cannot necessarily be attributed to the amendment itself.

== Notable endorsers ==
Notable endorsers of the MCRI include:

- Michigan Association of Scholars
- National Association of Scholars
- Ward Connerly: California businessman who led a similar campaign in California with Proposition 209
- Jennifer Gratz: executive director of the MCRI, plaintiff in the Supreme Court case Gratz v. Bollinger
- Barbara Grutter: plaintiff in Grutter v. Bollinger, co-chair of Towards a Fair Michigan
- Michigan Attorney General Michael (Mike) Cox
- Bill Schuette, Mike Cox's successor as Michigan Attorney General
- Michigan State Representative Leon Drolet: steering committee chair of MCRI
- William B. Allen: Michigan State University political science professor, co-chair of Towards a Fair Michigan
- Dr. Carl Cohen: University of Michigan philosophy professor
- Chetly Zarko : former Treasurer/Director of Media, MCRI, political consultant
- Doug Tietz: MCRI campaign manager, former U-M YAF Chair
- Greg Creswell: Libertarian Candidate for Governor of Michigan
- Scotty Boman: Libertarian Candidate for Lt. Governor of Michigan
- Reverend Jerry Zandstra: Republican primary candidate for US Senate, Michigan
- Howard Schwartz: Professor, Oakland University
- Arthur White: Professor, Western Michigan University
- Council of Conservative Citizens
- Libertarian Party of Michigan

== Opposition ==
Notable opponents of the MCRI include:

- One United Michigan
- National Association for the Advancement of Colored People (NAACP)
- Former Michigan Governor Jennifer Granholm
- Former Michigan gubernatorial candidate Dick DeVos
- Former Detroit Mayor Kwame Kilpatrick
- Oakland County sheriff and 2006 Republican U.S. Senate candidate Mike Bouchard.
- By Any Means Necessary (BAMN)
- Grand Rapids Mayor George Heartwell
- Jesse Jackson and the Rainbow/PUSH Coalition
- Association of Michigan Universities (AMU)
- Michigan Civil Rights Commission
- Al Sharpton
- Detroit City Council
- American-Arab Anti Discrimination Committee (ADC)
- American Civil Liberties Union (ACLU)
- Detroit Federation of Teachers
- Arab American Institute
- Green Party of Michigan (GPMI)
- Socialist Party of Michigan (SPMI)

== See also ==
- Affirmative action
- Ward Connerly
- Gratz v. Bollinger
- Grutter v. Bollinger
