= 2012 Washington Supreme Court election =

The Washington Supreme Court justices are elected at large by the voters of the state of Washington on November 6, 2012.

== Supreme Court Position 2 ==
Washington State Supreme Court Position 2 election, 2012
| Party | Candidate | Votes | % |
|---|---|---|---|
| Nonpartisan | Susan Owens | 2,098,447 | 100 |

== Supreme Court Position 8 ==
Washington State Supreme Court Position 8 election, 2012
| Party | Candidate | Votes | % |
|---|---|---|---|
| Nonpartisan | Steven Gonzalez | 2,082,194 | 100 |

== Supreme Court Position 9 ==
2012 Washington Supreme Court Position 9 election
| Candidate | Sheryl Gordon McCloud | Richard B. Sanders |
| Party | Nonpartisan | Nonpartisan |
| Popular vote | 1,355,144 | 1,097,846 |
| Percentage | 55.24% | 44.76% |
- McCloud: 50–60% 60–70% 70–80% Sanders: 50–60% 60–70%
Washington Supreme Court Justice before election
Tom Chambers
Nonpartisan
Elected Washington Supreme Court Justice
Sheryl Gordon McCloud
Nonpartisan

Washington State Supreme Court Position 9 election, 2012
| Party | Candidate | Votes | % |
|---|---|---|---|
| Nonpartisan | Sheryl Gordon McCloud | 1,355,144 | 55.24 |
| Nonpartisan | Richard B. Sanders | 1,097,846 | 44.76 |
