= The Multiracial Activist =

American political journal

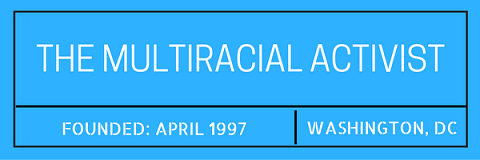
- Logo for "The Multiracial Activist"
- Editor: James Landrith
- Categories: Multiracial, interracial marriage, libertarianism, public policy
- Frequency: Bi-monthly
- Founded: 1997
- Company: Pious Pagan Publishing
- Country: United States
- Based in: Alexandria, Virginia
- Language: English
- Website: www.multiracial.com
- ISSN: 1552-3446

The Multiracial Activist (TMA) is a left-libertarian activist journal covering social and civil liberties issues of interest to individuals who perceive themselves to be biracial or multiracial. In addition, interracial couples and families and transracial adoptees are also constituencies covered. The magazine is based in Alexandria, Virginia.

== History ==
Founded in April 1997 by James A. Landrith, Jr., The Multiracial Activist is registered with the Library of Congress in Washington, DC under ISSN 1552-3446.

In addition to covering news on its core constituencies, The Multiracial Activist is involved in various civil liberties coalitions. Coalition topics include racial classifications, domestic surveillance, racial profiling, financial privacy, national identification cards, immigration reform, and general civil liberties issues. The Multiracial Activist participated as a plaintiff in a controversial lawsuit initiated by the Center for National Security Studies against the Department of Justice in December 2001.

== Advocacy ==
The Multiracial Activist participated in the efforts in the late 1990s to allow respondents to the U.S. Census and other government forms that collect racial classification data to check more than one racial classification box. Beginning in 1998, The Multiracial Activist published a letter from Bob Jones University, which eventually led to the repeal of their long-standing ban on interracial relationships among their student population.

In addition to working on racial classification issues, multiracial identity and interracial marriage, The Multiracial Activist and its founder currently serve on a diverse variety of civil liberties coalitions. Most notable are the Coalition for Patient Privacy, Asylum Working Group (sponsored by Human Rights First), Liberty Coalition and In Defense of Freedom.

== Books ==
The Multiracial Activist has been profiled in numerous books. Most notable are: 2003 The Fundamentals of Extremism, 2004 Social Identities: Multidisciplinary Approaches by Gary Taylor and Spencer Steve, 2004 The Politics of Multiracialism: Challenging Racial Thinking edited by Heather M. Dalmage, and 2006 Race and Multiraciality in Brazil and the United States: Converging Paths? by G. Reginald Daniel.

== See also ==
- Multiracial
- Race of the Future
