= American Civil Rights Institute =

- Established: 1996
- Tax ID no.: 52-2004697 (EIN)
- Key people: Ward Connerly
- Revenue: $266,575 (2017)
- Website: www.acri.org

The American Civil Rights Institute is an American conservative non-profit organization that opposes affirmative action. It was founded by Ward Connerly and Thomas L. "Dusty" Rhodes in 1996 in Sacramento, California. As of 2017 it operates from a mailing address in Coeur d'Alene, Idaho. It has also been called the American Civil Rights Coalition.

The organization's goals are diametrically opposed to those pursued by the majority of civil rights organizations. It describes itself as "a national civil rights organization created to educate the public on the harms of racial and gender preferences." It argues that programs intended to help minorities discriminate against non-miniority people. Ward Connerly describes his work as "fiercely committed to the ideal of a color-blind America."

The organization pays an unusually large amount of money to its executive, at times exceeding half the organization's total revenue. The American Conservative observed that "Connerly cashes in" on affirmative action, making millions of dollars.

== Goal ==
The American Civil Rights Institute (ACRI) was established in 1996 by Ward Connerly and Thomas L. "Dusty" Rhodes (President of Review) after leading the campaign in California to adopt Proposition 209. The organization opposes affirmative action and racial and gender preferences in federal, state and local government programs. It focuses on public education, policy research and supporting constitutional amendments in California, Washington, Florida, Michigan, Nebraska and Arizona that seek to abolish racial and gender preferences. ACRI also assists other anti-affirmative action organizations in various states in opposing racial and gender preferences in government programs and advancing the view that such racial and gender preferences are harmful. ACRI states that its members believe that "civil rights are individual rights and government policies should not uphold group rights over individual rights."

The organization's goals are diametrically opposed to those pursued by the majority of civil rights organizations.

== Funding ==
Ward Connerly takes in donations to help fund ACRI. In 2001, Connerly received $700,000 from Lynde and Harry Bradley Foundation of Milwaukee for his anti-affirmative action campaign in California. Connerly also gained $150,000 from Olin Foundation and $200,000 from Richard Mellon Scaife.

== High executive pay ==
Ward Connerly's personal financial gain from his organization is unusually high for a nonprofit. In 2006, Connerly was paid $1.6 million by the American Civil Rights Institute, 66% of the organization's total revenue, making him the second-highest paid nonprofit executive in greater Sacramento. Some of this pay comes from Connerly hiring himself as a consultant and speaker.

Congressmen John Conyers and Charles Rangel directed the Internal Revenue Service to investigate the possibility that Connerly's compensation violates law against using nonprofits to enrich oneself.
