= 2008 Nebraska Initiative 424 =

Referendum banning affirmative action at the state level

- November 4, 2008
- Nebraska Civil Rights Initiative; A constitutional amendment to prohibit the State, any public institution of higher education, political subdivision or government institution from discriminating against, or granting preferential treatment to, individuals or groups based upon race, sex, color, ethnicity, or national origin in operating public employment, education or contracting.

Results
Choice	Votes	%
Yes	404,766	57.56%
No	298,401	42.44%
Valid votes	703,167	100.00%
Invalid or blank votes	0	0.00%
Total votes	703,167	100.00%
- County results Yes 50%–60% 60%–70% No 50%–60% Tie

The Nebraska Civil Rights Initiative, also known as Initiative 424, was a 2008 ballot measure that proposed a constitutional amendment which would prohibit the state from discriminating against, or granting preferential treatment to, "any individual or group on the basis of race, sex, color, ethnicity, or national origin in the operation of public employment, public education, or public contracting." The measure, in effect, banned affirmative action at the state level. It passed with 58% of the vote.

== Amendment Wording ==
Be it enacted by the people of the State of Nebraska that, Article I of the Constitution of Nebraska be amended by adding a Section 30 as follows:

(1) The state shall not discriminate against, or grant preferential treatment to, any individual or group on the basis of race, sex, color, ethnicity, or national origin in the operation of public employment, public education, or public contracting.
(2) This section shall apply only to action taken after the section's effective date.
(3) Nothing in this section prohibits bona fide qualifications based on sex that are reasonably necessary to the normal operation of public employment, public education, or public contracting.
(4) Nothing in this section shall invalidate any court order or consent decree that is in force as of the effective date of this section.
(5) Nothing in this section prohibits action that must be taken to establish or maintain eligibility for any federal program, if ineligibility would result in a loss of federal funds to the state.
(6) For purposes of this section, state shall include, but not be limited to:

(a) the State of Nebraska;
(b) any agency, department, office, board, commission, committee, division, unit, branch, bureau, council, or subunit of the state;
(c) any public institution of higher education;
(d) any political subdivision of or within the state; and
(e) any government institution or instrumentally of or within the state.

(7) The remedies available for violations of this section shall be the same, regardless of the injured party’s race, sex, color, ethnicity, or national origin, as are otherwise available for violations of Nebraska’s anti-discrimination law.
(8) This section shall be self executing. If any part or parts of this section are found to be in conflict with federal law or the Constitution of the United States, this section shall be implemented to the maximum extent that federal law and the Constitution of the United States permit. Any provision held invalid shall be severable from the remaining portions of this section.

== Ballot Description ==
A Constitutional amendment to prohibit the state from discriminating against, or granting preferential treatment to any individual or group on the basis of race, sex, color, ethnicity, or national origin in public employment, public education or public contracting; to apply the amendment only to action after the amendment's effective date; to allow bona fide qualifications based on sex that are reasonably necessary; to exempt any court order or consent decree that is in force as of the effective date of this amendment; to provide an exception for certain federal programs; to define state for purposes of the amendment; to provide for remedies; to make the amendment self-executing; to make provision in the event of conflict with federal law or the United States Constitution; and to provide for severability.

== Text of Measure ==
Be it enacted by the people of the State of Nebraska that, Article I of the Constitution of Nebraska be amended by adding a Section 30 as follows:

(1) The state shall not discriminate against, or grant preferential treatment to, any individual or group on the basis of race, sex, color, ethnicity, or national origin in the operation of public employment, public education, or public contracting.

(2) This section shall apply only to action taken after the section's effective date.

(3) Nothing in this section prohibits bona fide qualifications based on sex that are reasonably necessary to the normal operation of public employment, public education, or public contracting.

(4) Nothing in this section shall invalidate any court order or consent decree that is in force as of the effective date of this section.

(5) Nothing in this section prohibits action that must be taken to establish or maintain eligibility for any federal program, if ineligibility would result in a loss of federal funds to the state.

(6) For purposes of this section, state shall include, but not be limited to: (a) the State of Nebraska; (b) any agency, department, office, board, commission, committee, division, unit, branch, bureau, council, or sub-unit of the state; (c) any public institution of higher education; (d) any political subdivision of or within the state; and (e) any government institution or instrumentally of or within the state.

(7) The remedies available for violations of this section shall be the same, regardless of the injured party's race, sex, color, ethnicity, or national origin, as are otherwise available for violations of Nebraska's antidiscrimination law.

(8) This section shall be self executing. If any part or parts of this section are found to be in conflict with federal law or the Constitution of the United States, this section shall be implemented to the maximum extent that federal law and the Constitution of the United States permit. Any provision held invalid shall be severable from the remaining portions of this section.

== Support ==
The Nebraska Civil Rights Initiative was one of the anti-preferential-treatment initiatives supported by civil rights activist Ward Connerly during the 2008 elections, in what he called a "Super Tuesday for Equal Rights". While similar measures were voted on in other states, voters in Nebraska were the only ones to approve such a measure in 2008.

== Results ==
Initiative 424
Choice	Votes	%
For	404,766	57.56
Against	298,401	42.44
Total	703,167	100.00
