= Richard B. Sanders =

American judge

- Education: University of Washington
- Occupation: Judge
- Political party: Republican

Richard Browning Sanders is a former justice of the Washington Supreme Court.

== Early life and education ==
Richard Sanders attended Highline High School. In school, he played horn in the band and was a member of the debate team. He graduated from the University of Washington, where he studied political science and wrote for the Daily of the University of Washington, then went on to earn his Juris Doctor degree from the same university.

== Career ==
After law school, Sanders became an active litigation attorney who, according to Seattle Metropolitan was "best known for representing builders and property owners battling land-use constraints. But he also represented many poor and minority clients in discrimination and injury suits." In 1976, he was one of the first lawyers to defy the American Bar Association's Code of Professional Responsibility that proscribed public advertising.

Sanders became a dues-paying member of the Libertarian Party in 1984. He was elected in 1995 to a partial term to fill a vacancy on the Washington Supreme Court, defeating Rosselle Pekelis despite a "not qualified" rating from the King County Bar Association. He was re-elected to two additional full six-year terms in 1998 and 2004. During his tenure on the court, Sanders wrote more dissenting opinions than any other justice in the court's history. He surprised the conservatives who had backed his first bid by adopting strong civil libertarian positions, casting the sole dissent against Washington's three-strikes law and frequently siding with criminal defendants in appellate cases, including one case in which he was the sole justice to posit that a Black motorist wrongfully arrested for a traffic violation had a right to resist arrest.

Sanders attracted national headlines when, during a 2008 banquet of the Federalist Society in Washington, D.C., he shouted "Tyrant! You are a tyrant!" at U.S. Attorney General Michael Mukasey, after which Mukasey fainted. Two years later, he let his society membership lapse, declaring he felt closer to the ACLU than the Federalist Society.

In 2010, Sanders ran for reelection and lost to Charlie Wiggins in one of the closer elections in Washington State. Sanders attracted controversy over a statement he made, and later retracted, that certain minority groups "have a crime problem", as well as his vote upholding a ban on gay marriage. In 2012 he ran and lost a bid to return to the Washington Supreme Court.

== Personal life ==
Sanders has been twice married, and twice divorced.
