= Initiative 200 =

1998 anti-affirmative action in Washington

Initiative 200 was a successful Washington state initiative to stop racial discrimination and sex discrimination by state and local government, including within university admissions. It was filed by Scott Smith and Tim Eyman. It was on the Washington ballot in November 1998 and passed with 58.22% of the vote. It added to Washington's law (not its constitution) the following language:

The state shall not discriminate against, or grant preferential treatment to, any individual or group on the basis of race, sex, color, ethnicity, or national origin in the operation of public employment, public education, or public contracting.

Initiative 200 effectively curtailed any form of affirmative action in the state. In April 2019, the Washington Legislature passed Initiative 1000, attempting to override the will of the voters by ending the ban on affirmative action; in November 2019, voters had the opportunity to stop the legislature, and succeeded, as Referendum 88 blocked Initiative 1000 from going into effect.

== Background ==
In the late 1960s and early 1970s, as the civil rights movement came to an end, states nationwide developed policies as a form of remedy aimed to help mitigate the impact of institutionalized racism, sexism, etc. The policies were created to give special consideration to underrepresented minorities when state contracts and hiring where involved. In doing so the state believed that the availability of opportunities would help in the advancement of underrepresented minorities. Chapter 49.60 RCW, which prohibited discrimination against any person on basis of race, color, creed, national origin, family and marital statute, sex, age, or disability, was the standing Washington law prior to the enactment of Initiative 200, and had been upheld previously by courts and the Human Rights Commission. Included in the statute was a provision requiring state agencies access to affirmative action strategies to increase opportunities amongst racial minorities, including women, and veterans. State funded schools and universities were granted authority to establish their own entrance and admissions program with entrance requirements. The requirements outlined in the admission program must have complied with all federal laws prohibiting discrimination. Some universities had admissions policies in which the objective was to select students who had demonstrated capacity, high quality work, and who would contribute to a diverse student body.

== Initiative ==
Initiative 200, a Washington State statute enacted by direct public vote took place in November 1998. The voting took place statewide, with approximately 1.9 million voters taking to the polls. 58.2 percent, or a grand total of 1,099,410 voters supported the measure. Statewide, all counties passed the statute, with only one exception, King County, in all places but Seattle.

Following the initiative's passage, Washington Governor Gary Locke, who had opposed the initiative, issued a directive to guide state agencies in its implementation. The governor's directive was criticized as "timid" by the free-market think tank Washington Policy Center.

== Opposition ==
Proponents of I-200 said it was a step toward a "colorblind" society, a promise of the equality of merit and the limited role of government to make that so. However, opponents have noted that colorblind ideologies individualize conflicts and shortcomings, rather than examining the larger picture with cultural differences, stereotypes, and values placed into context. Among the outspoken opponents of the measure included former Governor Gary Locke. The Seattle Post-Intelligencer's Editorial Board also noted:

Initiative 200 proponents forget where we've been and misjudge where we are. They try to equate the wretched, hateful use of government in the past with the present use of government as a tool of equality. The comparison will not wash. The former had as its goal the primacy of a single race and gender and the consolidation of power and wealth along those lines. The latter has as its goal the diffusion and sharing of power. Until the goal is met, it is a worthy role for government.

Opponents have criticized Tim Eyman, the Initiative's sponsor, for diverting campaign funds meant for several ballot initiatives he sponsored for personal use. In 2000 and 2001, it was discovered that Eyman diverted as much as $200,000 in campaign funds for several of his initiatives.

== Outcomes ==
The impact of I-200 on higher education, particularly in the face of the State's substantial growth of minority groups and the demand for an educated workforce, continues to be debated.

While I-200 was enacted, more than half of all American Indians who graduated from high school were college bound. In 2003, those numbers dropped to 38 percent. One year after I-200 was passed, minority enrollment fell from 8.2% to 7%. In 2003 minority enrollment surpassed rates before I-200, which was partially due to an increase in the number of minorities in Washington state. By 2013, minority enrollment at the University of Washington rose from 8.2% to 12.6% in 2013,

In 2015, minorities represented roughly 50% of total students in each of the three University of Washington campuses, individually. These numbers exclude international students and students who did not self-report race or ethnic data. In 2023, the total enrollment across University of Washington campuses was 34% White and 66% minorities, with "traditionally underrepresented" (in other words, "non-Asian") minorities at 17%. The three campuses ranged from 55-69% non-White students, not accounting for international students or students who did not self-report racial or ethnic data.
