= Chambers =

Chambers commonly refers to:

- Chambers (surname), including a list of people with the name
- Chambers (TV series), a 2019 American supernatural horror show

Chambers may also refer to:

== Places ==
=== Canada ===
- Chambers Township, Ontario

=== United States ===
- Chambers, Arizona
- Chambers, Nebraska
- Chambers, West Virginia
- Chambers Branch, a stream in Kansas
- Chambers County, Alabama
- Chambers County, Texas
- Chambers Township, Holt County, Nebraska

== Businesses and products ==
- Chambers (publisher), formerly W. & R. Chambers Publishers
  - Chambers Dictionary, first published 1872
  - Chambers Biographical Dictionary, first published in 1897
  - Chambers's Encyclopaedia, 1859–1979
- Chambers Communications, an American broadcasting company
- Chambers and Partners, producing rankings for the legal industry
- Chambers stove, cooking appliances sold under the Chambers brand

== Other uses ==
- Chambers (album), by Steady & Co., 2001
- Chambers (series), a British radio and TV sitcom
- Chambers (ship), the name of several ships
- Barristers' chambers, rooms used by barristers
- Judge's chambers, the office of a judge

== See also ==
- Chamber (disambiguation)
- Chambers Building (disambiguation)
- Chambers House (disambiguation)
- Chambers Lake (disambiguation)
- Chambers Street (disambiguation)
- Justice Chambers (disambiguation)
- Hedingham & Chambers, an English bus company
