= Chambers House =

Chambers House, or Chambers Farmstead, or Chambers Farm, or Chambers Barn or variations, may refer to the following in the United States:

- Chambers-Robinson House, Sheffield, Alabama, listed on the National Register of Historic Places (NRHP) in Colbert County, Alabama
- Chambers Ranch, Colorado Springs, Colorado, listed on the National Register of Historic Places (NRHP) in El Paso County, Colorado
- Chambers House (College Avenue, Newark, Delaware), listed on the NRHP in New Castle County, Delaware
- Chambers House (Hopkins Bridge Road, Newark, Delaware), listed on the NRHP in New Castle County, Delaware
- William Chambers House, Carnesville, Georgia, listed on the NRHP in Banks County, Georgia
- Robert Chambers House, Burlington, Kentucky, listed on the NRHP in Boone County, Kentucky
- A. E. Chambers Octagonal Barn, Petersburg, Kentucky, listed on the NRHP in Boone County, Kentucky
- C. Scott Chambers House and Funeral Parlor, Walton, Kentucky, listed on the NRHP in Boone County, Kentucky
- Whittaker Chambers Farm, Westminster, Maryland, NRHP-listed
- John Chambers House, St. Ignace, Michigan, NRHP-listed
- Maxwell Chambers House, Salisbury, North Carolina, listed on the NRHP in Rowan County, North Carolina
- Chambers-Morgan Farm, White Store, North Carolina, listed on the NRHP in Anson County, North Carolina
- Brigman-Chambers House, Weaverville, North Carolina, listed on the NRHP in Buncombe County, North Carolina
- Matthew C. Chambers Barn, Albany, Oregon, listed on the NRHP in Linn County, Oregon
- Frank L. and Ida H. Chambers House, Eugene, Oregon, NRHP-listed
- Fred E. Chambers House and Grounds, Eugene, Oregon, NRHP-listed
- Joseph and Virginia Chambers Farmstead, Newberg, Oregon, listed on the NRHP in Yamhill County, Oregon
- C. E. Chambers House, Mitchell, South Dakota, listed on the NRHP in Davison County, South Dakota
- Samuel A. Chambers House, Abilene, Texas, listed on the NRHP in Taylor County, Texas
- Chambers House (Beaumont, Texas), a historic house museum of Texas
- Hodges-Hardy-Chambers House, Wichita Falls, Texas, listed on the NRHP in Wichita County, Texas
- Pearl and Eva Chambers House, Eau Claire, Wisconsin, listed on the NRHP in Eau Claire County, Wisconsin
- Chambers-Markle Farmstead, La Crosse, Wisconsin, listed on the NRHP in La Crosse County, Wisconsin
- Andy Chambers Ranch Historic District, Moose, Wyoming, NRHP-listed

== See also ==
- Chambers Building (disambiguation)
