= Judge Chambers =

Judge Chambers may refer to:

- Richard Harvey Chambers (1906–1994), judge of the United States Court of Appeals for the Ninth Circuit
- Robert Chambers (English judge) (1737–1803), chief justice of the Supreme Court of Judicature at Fort William, Bengal
- Robert Charles Chambers (born 1952), judge of the United States District Court for the Southern District of West Virginia
- Tom Chambers (judge) (1943–2013), associate justice of the Washington State Supreme Court
- William Lea Chambers (1852–1933), United States-appointed chief justice of Samoa

== See also ==
- Judge's chambers
- Justice Chambers (disambiguation)
