= Jay Inslee =

American politician and attorney (born 1951)

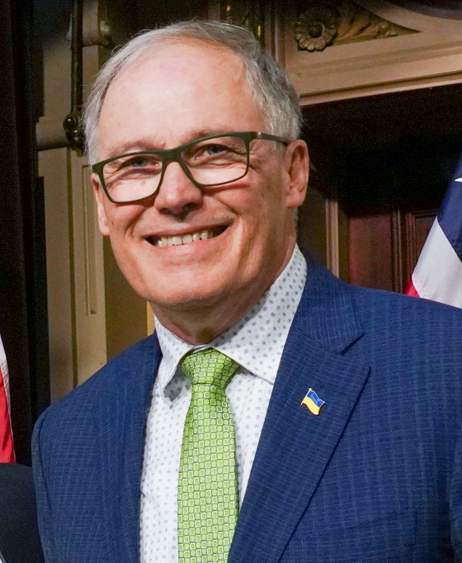
- Inslee in 2024

23rd Governor of Washington
- In office January 16, 2013 – January 15, 2025
- Lieutenant: Brad Owen; Cyrus Habib; Denny Heck
- Preceded by: Christine Gregoire
- Succeeded by: Bob Ferguson

Member of the U.S. House of Representatives from Washington
- In office January 3, 1999 – March 20, 2012
- Preceded by: Rick White
- Succeeded by: Suzan DelBene
- Constituency: 1st district
- In office January 3, 1993 – January 3, 1995
- Preceded by: Sid Morrison
- Succeeded by: Doc Hastings
- Constituency: 4th district

Member of the Washington House of Representatives from the 14th district
- In office January 9, 1989 – January 11, 1993
- Preceded by: Jim Lewis
- Succeeded by: Dave Lemmon

Personal details
- Born: Jay Robert Inslee; February 9, 1951 (age 75) Seattle, Washington, U.S.
- Party: Democratic
- Spouse: Trudi Tindall (m. 1972)
- Children: 3
- Education: Stanford University (attended); University of Washington (BA); Willamette University (JD)
- Jay Inslee's voice Inslee opposing a bill to increase offshore fracking off the Virginia coast and the Gulf of Mexico.. Recorded May 5, 2011

Jay Robert Inslee (/ˈɪnzli/ INZ-lee; born February 9, 1951) is an American politician and attorney who served as the 23rd governor of Washington from 2013 to 2025. A member of the Democratic Party, he previously served in the United States House of Representatives from 1993 to 1995 and from 1999 to 2012. Inslee was also a candidate in the 2020 Democratic Party presidential primaries.

Born and raised in Seattle, Inslee graduated from the University of Washington and Willamette University College of Law. He served in the Washington House of Representatives from 1989 to 1993. In 1992, Inslee was elected to represent Washington's 4th congressional district, based around Central Washington, in the U.S. House of Representatives. Defeated for reelection in 1994, Inslee briefly returned to private legal practice. He made his first run for governor of Washington in 1996, coming in fifth in the blanket primary with 10% of the vote. Inslee then served as regional director for the United States Department of Health and Human Services under President Bill Clinton.

Inslee returned to the U.S. House of Representatives in 1999 representing Washington's 1st congressional district. The new district included Seattle's northern suburbs in King County, Snohomish County, and Kitsap County. He was re-elected six times before announcing that he would make another run for the governorship in the 2012 election. He defeated Republican Rob McKenna, the state attorney general, 52% to 48%, in the general election. Inslee was reelected to a second term in 2016. He was briefly a candidate for the Democratic nomination for the 2020 presidential election before being reelected to a third term as governor that year. On May 1, 2023, he announced that he would not run for a fourth term.

As governor, Inslee emphasized climate change, education, criminal justice reform, and drug policy reform. He garnered national attention for his critiques of President Donald Trump. Inslee joined then state attorney general Bob Ferguson and state solicitor general Noah Purcell in suing the first Trump administration over Executive Order 13769, which halted travel for 90 days from seven Muslim-majority countries and imposed a total ban on Syrian refugees entering the United States. The case, Washington v. Trump, led to the order being blocked by the courts; other executive orders later superseded it.

== Early life, education, legal career, and personal life ==
Jay Robert Inslee was born February 9, 1951, in Seattle, Washington, the oldest of three sons of Adele A. (née Brown; d. 2007) and Frank E. Inslee (1926–2014). Inslee is a fifth-generation Washingtonian. Inslee describes his family as being of English and Welsh descent.

Inslee attended Seattle's Ingraham High School, where he was an honor-roll student and star athlete, graduating in 1969. He played center on his high school basketball team and was also the starting quarterback on his football team.

Inslee's interest in environmental issues originated at an early age, with his parents leading groups of high school students on trips cleaning Mount Rainier. He met his future wife, Trudi Tindall, at Ingraham during his sophomore year. Graduating at the height of the Vietnam War, Inslee received student deferments from the draft.

Inslee began college at Stanford University, where he initially intended on studying medicine. After a year, he was forced to drop out because he was unable to get a scholarship. He returned home and, living in his parents' basement, attended the University of Washington. He received a Bachelor of Arts with a major in economics in 1973. He then attended the Willamette University College of Law in Salem, Oregon, receiving a Juris Doctor in 1976.

Inslee and his wife were married on August 27, 1972, and have three sons: Jack, Connor, and Joseph. After Inslee finished law school, they moved to Selah, a suburb of Yakima. Inslee joined the law firm Peters, Schmalz, Leadon & Fowler, working as a city prosecutor. He practiced in Selah for 10 years. He first became politically active in 1985, while advocating for the construction of a new high school. The experience sparked Inslee's interest in politics, emboldening him to run for political office.

== Washington House of Representatives (1989–1993) ==
=== Elections ===
Inslee ran for the Washington House of Representatives in 1988 after incumbent Republican State Representative Jim Lewis left office. His opponent, Lynn Carmichael, was the former mayor of Yakima and considered the front-runner in the race. Inslee also struggled to balance his more progressive ideology with the conservative leanings of Central Washington. His campaign attempted to rectify this by emphasizing his rural upbringing and legal experience supporting local average people, farms and businesses. The Washington State Trial Lawyers Association became Inslee's biggest contributor.

When presented with a potential state budget surplus, Inslee called for a tax cut for the middle class, which Carmichael called irresponsible. Inslee claimed Carmichael had supported a sales tax, which she denied. Inslee was an energetic and active campaigner, benefiting from retail politics.

In the blanket primary, Carmichael ranked first with 43% and Inslee ranked second with 40%. Republican Glen Blomgren ranked third with 17%. In the general election, Inslee defeated Carmichael 52%-48%. In 1990, Inslee was reelected with 62% of the vote against Republican Ted Mellotte.

=== Tenure ===
In the Washington state legislature, Inslee pursued a bill to provide initial funding to build five branch campuses of the Washington State University system. Although the bill failed, his tenacity made an impression on House Speaker Joe King, who said, "He's not afraid to incur the wrath of the speaker or the caucus." Inslee also focused on preventing steroid usage among high school athletes and pushed for a bill requiring all drivers to carry auto insurance. In 1991, he voted for a bill that required the state to devise a cost-effective energy strategy and state agencies and school districts to pursue and maintain energy-efficient operations.

=== Committee assignments ===
Inslee served on the Higher Education and Housing Committees.

== Congress (1993–1995) ==
=== Elections ===
1992

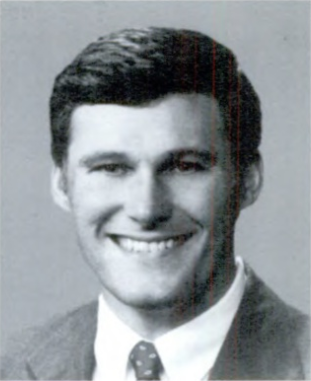
Inslee during the 103rd Congress

In 1992, six-term incumbent U.S. Representative Sid Morrison chose not to run for reelection representing Washington's 4th congressional district, instead mounting a campaign for governor. Morrison was a popular moderate Republican incumbent who was considered successful and well-liked in the Democratic-controlled Congress. Despite initially declining to run, Inslee launched a campaign for the open Congressional seat, based in the central-eastern part of the state. His home area of the district, anchored by Yakima, is relatively rural and agriculture-based, while the southeastern part is more focused on research and nuclear waste disposal, anchored by the Tri-Cities. Inslee defeated a favored state senator to win the Democratic primary by 1%. Despite the district's conservative lean, Inslee won the general election in an extremely close race.

1994

He lost his bid for reelection in the Republican Revolution of 1994 in a rematch against his 1992 opponent, Doc Hastings. Inslee attributed his 1994 defeat in large part to his vote for the Federal Assault Weapons Ban.

=== Tenure ===
In Congress, Inslee passed the Yakima River Enhancement Act, a bill long held up in Congress, by brokering a breakthrough with irrigators and wildlife advocates. He also helped to open Japanese markets to American apples and to fund and oversee the nation's biggest nuclear waste site at the Hanford Nuclear Reservation near Richland, Washington.

=== Committee assignments ===
- United States House Committee on Agriculture
- United States House Committee on Science, Space, and Technology

== Inter-congressional years (1995–1999) ==
Inslee moved to Bainbridge Island, a suburb of Seattle, and briefly resumed the practice of law.

=== 1996 gubernatorial election ===
Inslee ran for governor of Washington in 1996, losing in the blanket primary. Democratic King County Executive and former State Representative Gary Locke ranked first with 23.65% of the vote. Democratic Mayor of Seattle Norm Rice ranked second with 17.5%, but did not qualify for the general election. Republican State Senator Ellen Craswell ranked third with 15.26%, and became the Republican candidate in the general election. Republican State Senator and Senate Majority Leader Dale Foreman ranked fourth with 13.37%. Inslee ranked fifth with 9.75%. No other candidate on the ballot received double digits.

After his failed gubernatorial bid, Inslee was appointed regional director for the United States Department of Health and Human Services by then-President Bill Clinton.

== Congress (1999–2012) ==
=== Elections ===
Inslee ran again for Congress in 1998, this time in the 1st congressional district against two-term incumbent Rick White. His campaign attracted national attention when he became the first Democratic candidate to air television ads attacking his opponent and the Republican congressional leadership for the Lewinsky scandal. Inslee won with 49.8% of the vote to White's 44.1%; he had an unintentional assist in his successful return by the conservative third-party candidacy of Bruce Craswell, husband of 1996 GOP gubernatorial nominee Ellen Craswell.

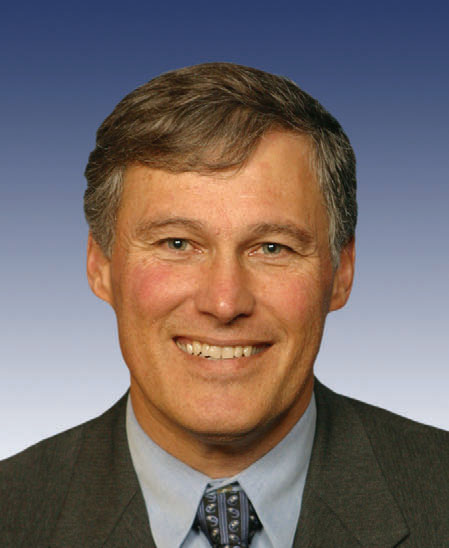
Inslee during the 109th U.S. Congress

Inslee was reelected six times. In 2000, he defeated State Senate Minority Leader Dan McDonald with 54.6% of the vote. In 2002, Inslee defeated former state representative Joe Marine with 55.6% of the vote after the district was made more Democratic by redistricting. He never faced another contest that close, and was reelected three more times with over 60% of the vote.

In July 2003, after Gary Locke announced he would not seek a third term as Washington's governor, Inslee briefly flirted with a gubernatorial bid before deciding to remain in Congress.

During the 2009-2010 campaign cycle, Inslee raised $1,140,025. In data compiled for the period 2005 to 2007 and excluding individual contributions of less than $200, 64 percent of Inslee's donations were from outside the state of Washington and 86 percent came from outside his district (compared to 79 percent for the average House member). 43 percent of Inslee's donations came from Washington, D.C., Virginia and Maryland. The largest interests funding Inslee's campaign were pharmaceutical and health-related companies, lawyers and law firms, and high-tech companies.

In 2010 he won by a 15-point margin, with 57.67% of the votes cast in his favor.

=== Tenure ===
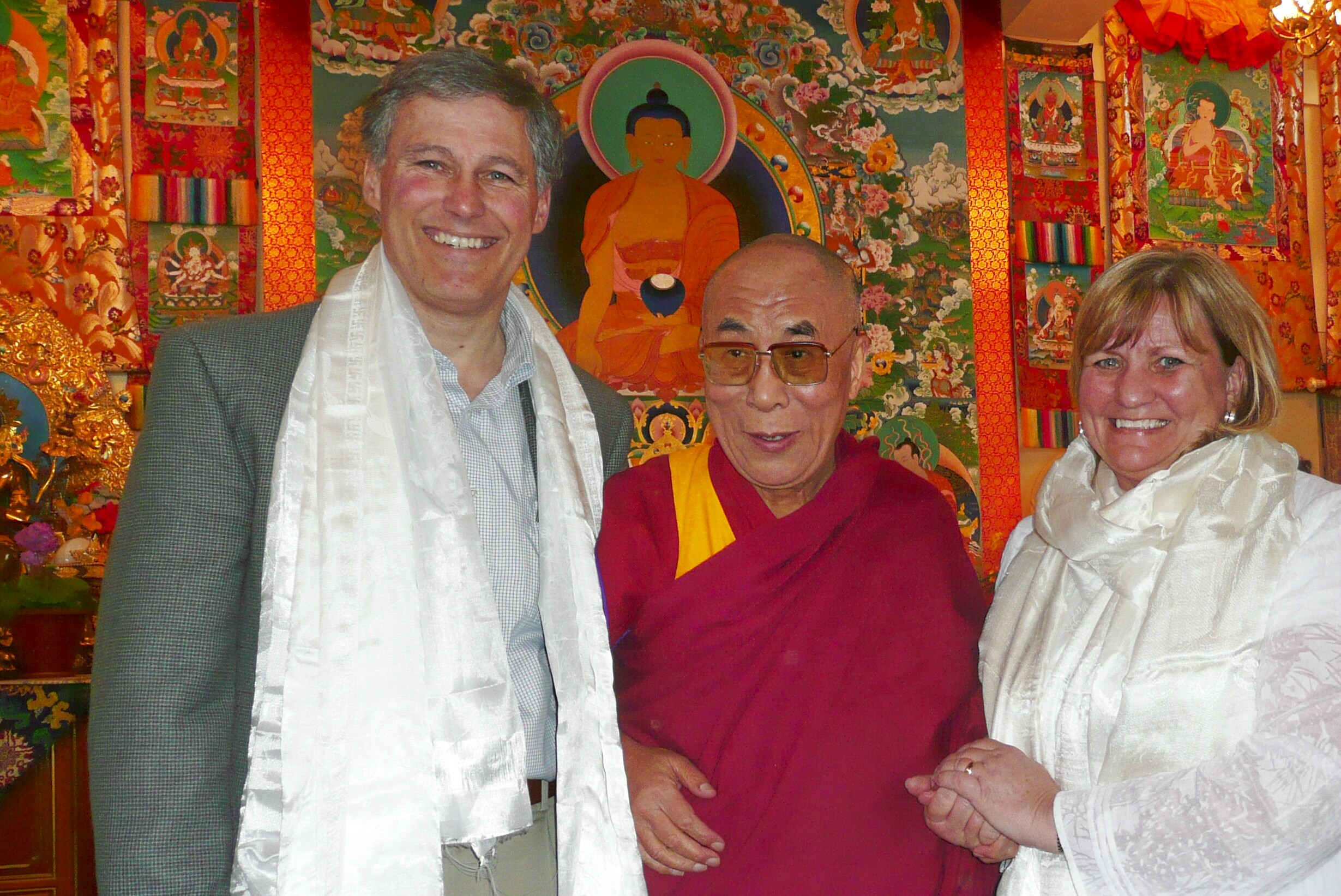
Jay Inslee and his wife Trudi Inslee met with the Dalai Lama in 2008.

As a member of the centrist New Democrat Coalition, Inslee vocally supported policies combating climate change.

Inslee was awarded a "Friend of the National Parks" award by the National Parks Conservation Association (NPCA) in 2001 for his support of legislation protecting the integrity and quality of the National Park System.

Inslee was "one of Congress's most ardent advocates of strong action to combat global warming," according to The New York Times. He was the first public figure to propose an Apollo-like energy program, in an opinion editorial in the Seattle Post-Intelligencer on December 19, 2002, and a series of similar pieces in other publications. Inslee co-authored Apollo's Fire: Igniting America's Clean Energy Economy, in which he argues that through improved federal policies the United States can wean itself off foreign oil and fossil fuel, create millions of green-collar jobs, and stop global warming. He has been a prominent supporter of the Apollo Alliance. Inslee strongly believes the Environmental Protection Agency should remain authorized to regulate greenhouse gas emissions. In a 2011 House hearing on the Energy Tax Prevention Act, he said Republicans have "an allergy to science and scientists" during a discussion of whether the regulation of greenhouse gases under the Clean Air Act should remain in place following a controversial court finding on the issue.

Inslee was an outspoken critic of the George W. Bush administration's 2003 invasion of Iraq. On July 31, 2007, he introduced legislation calling for an inquiry to determine whether then United States Attorney General Alberto Gonzales should be impeached. Gonzales eventually resigned.

Still an avid basketball player and fan, Inslee identified as a member of "Hoopaholics", a charity group dedicated to "treatment of old guys addicted to basketball and who can no longer jump", as Inslee has often joked. In October 2009, he played basketball at the White House in a series of games featuring members of Congress on one team and members of the administration, including President Obama, on the other.

Inslee voted for the Patient Protection and Affordable Care Act, the federal health care law.

In 2011, Inslee voted in favor of authorizing the use of U.S. armed forces in the 2011 Libyan civil war and against limiting the use of funds to support NATO's 2011 military intervention in Libya.

Inslee was once touted as a candidate for United States Secretary of the Interior and for United States Secretary of Energy during the Presidential transition of Barack Obama.

On March 20, 2012, Inslee left Congress to focus on his campaign for governor of Washington.

=== Committee assignments ===
- United States House Committee on Energy and Commerce
  - United States House Energy Subcommittee on Energy and Power

=== Caucus memberships ===
- Congressional Friends of Animals Caucus
- Congressional Internet Caucus
- House Medicare and Medicaid Fairness Caucus
- House Oceans Caucus
- United States Congressional International Conservation Caucus
- Congressional Arts Caucus
- Sustainable Energy and Environment Coalition
- New Democrat Coalition

== Governor of Washington (2013–2025) ==
=== 2012 gubernatorial election ===
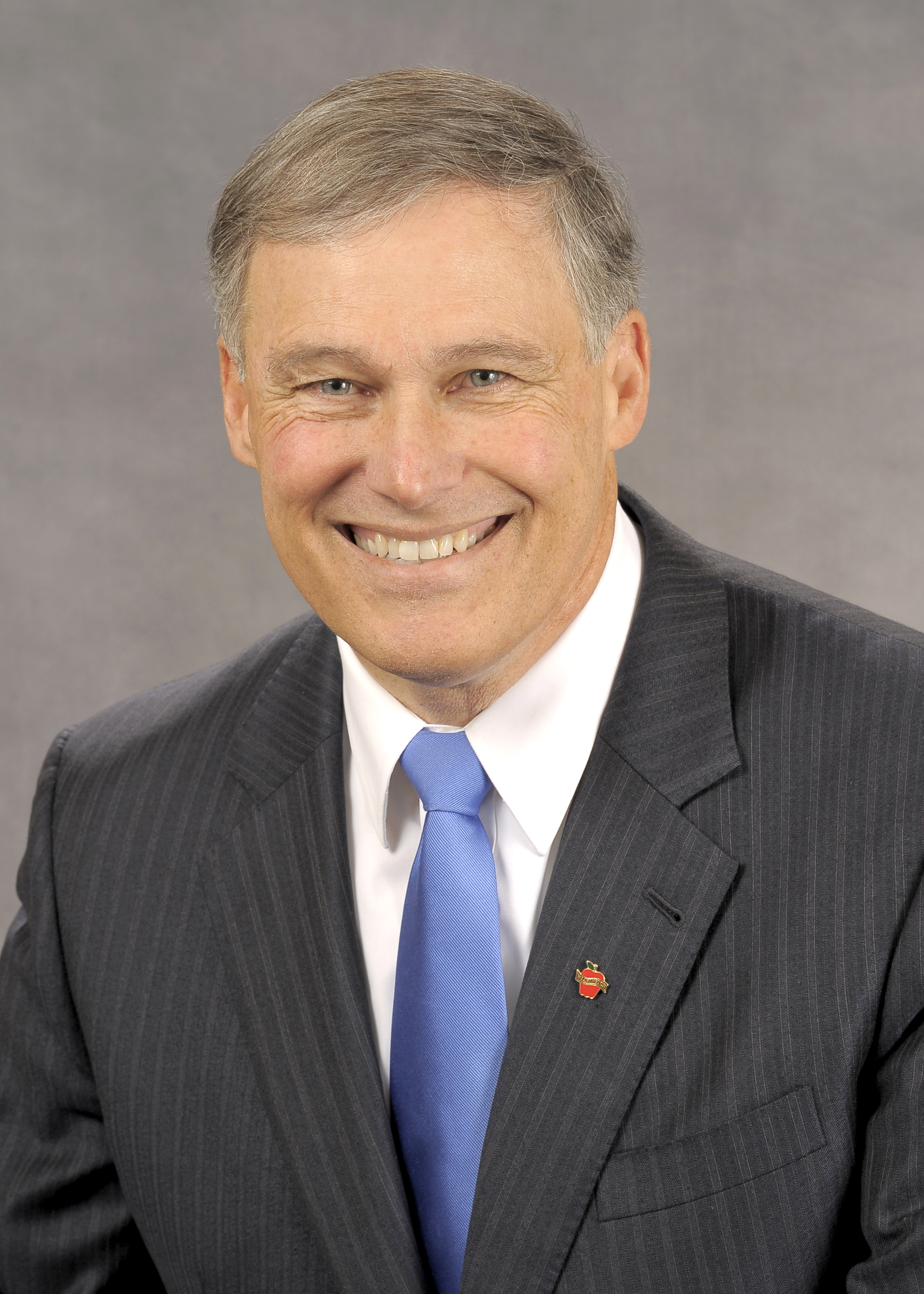
Official portrait, 2013

On June 27, 2011, Inslee announced his candidacy for governor of Washington. His campaign focused on job creation, outlining dozens of proposals to increase job growth in clean energy, the aerospace industry, and biotechnology. He also supported a ballot measure to legalize gay marriage, which passed, and opposed tax increases. Though trailing in early polls, he won election with 52% of the vote, a three-point margin over his Republican opponent, state attorney general Rob McKenna.

=== 2016 gubernatorial election ===
In December 2015, Inslee announced on Washington's public affairs television channel TVW that he would run for a second term as governor. He emphasized increased spending on transportation and education as his primary first-term accomplishment, though he had struggled to work with the Republican-controlled Majority Coalition Caucus in the State Senate.

In the general election Inslee faced former Port of Seattle Commissioner Bill Bryant. The primary issues of the campaign were climate change, job creation, minimum wage, and capital gains taxes. Inslee far outraised Bryant, and was reelected in November with 54% of the vote.

=== 2020 gubernatorial election ===
On March 1, 2019, Inslee announced he would run for president, but kept open the possibility of running for a third term if his presidential campaign failed. Several potential Democratic gubernatorial candidates, including state Attorney General Bob Ferguson, Commissioner of Public Lands Hilary Franz, and King County Executive Dow Constantine, were all waiting to announce campaigns until Inslee made his decision. As Inslee's presidential campaign failed to gain traction during the summer of 2019, he was pressured to drop out and make his gubernatorial plans clear to the other potential candidates. On August 21, 2019, Inslee dropped out of the presidential campaign and announced the next day he would run for reelection as governor.

Inslee's major opponents in the election were State Senator Phil Fortunato, Republic, Washington police chief Loren Culp, Yakima physician Raul Garcia, activist Tim Eyman and former Bothell mayor Joshua Freed. Inslee finished first in the primary, with 50% of the vote. Culp finished a distant second, with 17%. Inslee and Culp advanced to the general election, which Inslee won with 57% of the vote. His margin of victory was the largest in a gubernatorial election in Washington since Gary Locke's in 2000 and he also became the first Democrat in two decades to win a county in Eastern Washington, winning Whitman County.

Inslee became the first Washington governor elected to a third term since Dan Evans was reelected in 1972.

=== First term: 2013–2017 ===
During the 2013 session, the legislature failed to create a fiscal budget plan during the initial session, and Inslee was forced to call two special sessions to provide time for a budget to be created. The Republican-controlled Senate and Democratic-controlled House each passed its own budget and could not agree on one. Finally, in June 2013, Inslee signed a $33.6 billion budget to which both houses had agreed as a compromise. The budget increased funding for education by $1 billion. It also adjusted property taxes and tax breaks in order to increase state revenue by $1 billion.

On June 13, 2013, Inslee signed an additional estate tax into law. The tax had bipartisan support, and passed the Senate, 30–19.

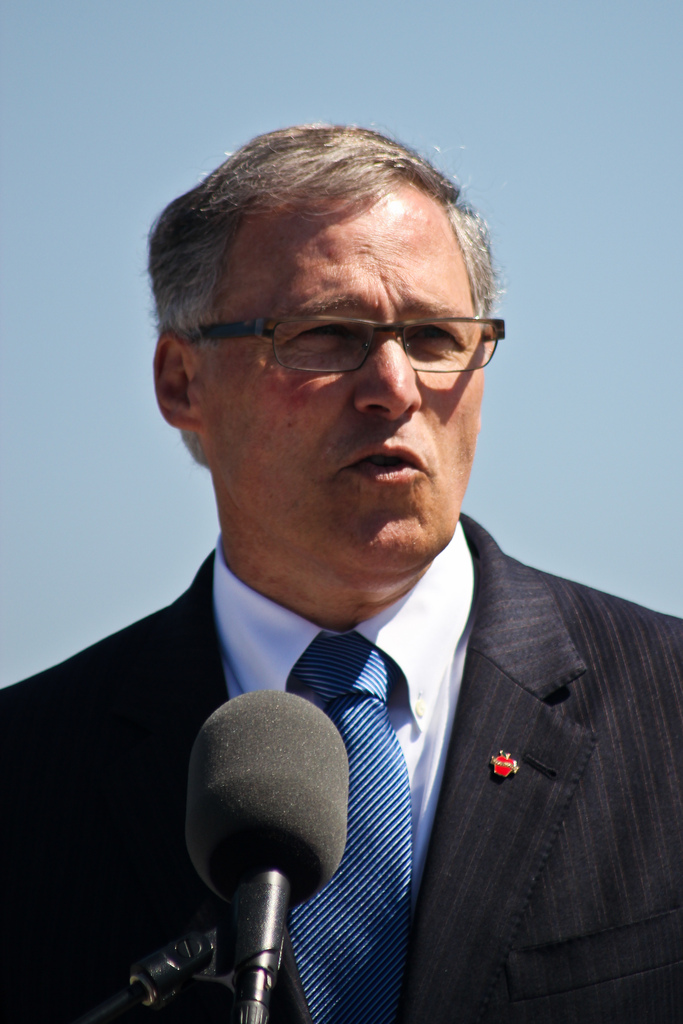
Inslee giving a speech regarding Boeing in May 2013

In December 2013, Inslee was elected to serve as finance chair of the Democratic Governors Association.

In January 2014, Inslee gave a speech commending machinists who voted to renew Boeing's contract with Seattle area union employees, allowing the company to build its Boeing 777x aircraft in Everett. He said the contract would bring Washington to a new industrial plateau and be a turning point for Washington jobs:

These jobs are in the thousands and it is not only on the 777X, the first model of the 777X, but all the subsequent derivative models as well.

The plan was to prevent Boeing from building part of the aircraft in Washington and part of it elsewhere, as they did with the Boeing 787, which was partially constructed in South Carolina.

On February 11, 2014, Inslee announced a moratorium on executions in Washington:

There have been too many doubts raised about capital punishment, there are too many flaws in this system today. There is too much at stake to accept an imperfect system.

Inslee cited the high cost of pursuing the death penalty, the randomness with which it is sought, and the lack of evidence that it is a deterrent.

=== Second term: 2017–2021 ===
Inslee began his second term on January 11, 2017, proposing full funding of state education (in compliance with the McCleary decision) and addressing mental health needs while also raising worker pay. After newly inaugurated President Donald Trump signed an executive order on January 27 banning people from seven Muslim-majority countries from entering the United States, Inslee and Attorney General Bob Ferguson announced their intention to sue Trump, alleging his order was unconstitutional. The civil action, Washington v. Trump, was filed on January 30 and on February 3 successfully earned a temporary restraining order to forbid federal enforcement of some of the ban's provisions. An appeal and request to stay filed by the federal government was subsequently denied by the United States Court of Appeals for the Ninth Circuit. Inslee and Ferguson declared victory over Trump on February 16, after his administration announced it would revise the travel ban to comply with the court decisions. Inslee garnered national media attention during the lawsuit.

During the 2017 legislative session, the Washington State Legislature failed to pass a state operating budget by the end of its regular session on April 25, so Inslee called for a 30-day special session. The legislature again failed to pass a budget during that session, forcing Inslee to call a third one, beginning June 22. As the state's fiscal year ends on June 30, a partial government shutdown was feared. Conflict over resource allocation between rural areas and urban areas was a major reason for the impasse. The State Senate passed a budget on June 30 and Inslee signed it into law shortly after 11 pm. Its specifics were still being released several hours after it was enacted. Lawmakers critiqued the haste with which the budget was considered and passed, having received the 616-page document only that day. By the end of the third session on July 20, the legislature had still failed to pass a capital budget concerning long-term goals and improvements. This was the third time during Inslee's tenure the state's budget was passed in the last week of the legislative session.

In December 2017 Inslee awarded $6.4 million in grant funding for apprenticeships and career connections to 29,000 youth in 11 communities. He called this initiative Career Connect Washington. It includes a Task Force and several prominent stakeholder groups including Alaska Airlines, Amazon, Boeing, Microsoft, and Kaiser Permanente. Career Connect Washington has established new apprenticeship opportunities, including the Aerospace Joint Apprenticeship Committee's registered Youth Apprenticeship program for high school students.

Inslee served as chair of the Democratic Governors Association for the 2018 election cycle, in which Democrats gained seven net governorships nationwide.

In December 2018, Inslee announced new legislation aimed at reducing the state's carbon emissions over approximately two decades. It would effectively require Washington utilities to end the use of fossil fuels by mid-century, making Washington "adopt a clean fuel standard", "promote electric and low-emission vehicles", and "provide incentives to renovate existing buildings to reduce" emissions.

In January 2019, Inslee said he would provide an expedited process for approximately 3,500 people convicted of small-time cannabis possession to apply for and receive pardons.

In May 2019, Inslee introduced major restrictions on firearm ownership in Washington State. This included a ban on homemade firearms made with 3D-printers. Other firearm legislation signed tightened the process for obtaining a concealed carry permit and the ability to strip gun-rights of those deemed by authorities to be a harm to themselves or others.

In March and April 2020, Inslee ordered significant social distancing measures statewide, including banning large events, a stay-at-home order, and the closing of all schools due to the COVID-19 pandemic.

On June 8, 2020, in the wake of protests over police brutality, a group of protesters established the Capitol Hill Autonomous Zone (also known as the Zone or the CHAZ) in Seattle. The Zone prided itself on offering free food and being free of police. However, it also experienced internal violence and vandalism, including four shootings in ten days. President Donald Trump condemned the Zone, saying that Seattle had been taken over by anarchists, and called on Inslee and the mayor of Seattle to "take back" the neighborhood from protesters. Inslee responded that he was unaware of the Zone's existence, but called on Trump to "stay out of Washington State's business".

In November 2020, Inslee was named a candidate for Secretary of Energy, Secretary of the Interior and the administrator of the Environmental Protection Agency in the Biden Administration.

=== Third term: 2021–2025 ===
Inslee began his third term on January 13, 2021.

On April 8, 2021, Inslee signed a bill restoring voting rights to convicted felons after they finish serving their sentences. This made Washington the 20th state to have such laws, and it was primarily sponsored by representative Tarra Simmons, who was formerly incarcerated herself.

On May 4, 2021, Inslee signed a new capital gains tax into law. The tax narrowly passed the Senate, 25–24. It affects certain investments, such as the sale of stocks and bonds, and taxes profits that total $250,000 or more at 7%. It includes many exemptions, including retirement accounts, livestock, timber, and real estate. This was followed by two lawsuits, which were later consolidated into one, led by former state attorney general and Inslee's 2012 gubernatorial opponent Rob McKenna. The lawsuit alleges that the tax is a state income tax in disguise and is unconstitutional due to precedent, with a graduated state income tax being declared unconstitutional in 1933. In September 2021, Grant County superior court judge Brian Huber allowed this lawsuit to proceed. In March 2023, the Washington Supreme Court dismissed the lawsuit and upheld the new capital gains tax, which took effect in April 2023.

In August 2021, Inslee mandated vaccinations for state and health care workers by October 18 without a weekly testing alternative.

Upon the resignation of New York governor Andrew Cuomo on August 23, 2021, Inslee became the longest-serving current governor in the United States. Inslee filed initial paperwork to run for a fourth term in the 2024 election, but announced in May 2023 that he would not run for a fourth term. Although some governors have run for a fourth term, none has been elected to a fourth term in the state's history.

Following the resignation of Republican Secretary of State Kim Wyman, to take a job in the Biden administration, Inslee was tasked with appointing her replacement. He appointed state senator Steve Hobbs, a Democrat, noting that former Republican governor John Spellman appointed Republican Dan Evans to fill the vacancy created by the death of Democratic U.S. Senator Scoop Jackson in 1983. Hobbs is a moderate who opposed many of Inslee's priorities while in the state senate, including abolishing the death penalty, gun control, reducing carbon emissions, expanding voting rights to parolees, and a state income tax. These positions put him at odds with Inslee and were widely seen as a prime reason for his appointment. The appointment led to the Washington State Democratic Party holding all nine statewide executive offices for the first time since the Great Depression.

In March 2022, Governor Jay Inslee supported the shipment of 32 tons of emergency medical supplies—valued at $3.5 million—from Seattle-Tacoma International Airport to Ukraine via Poland. This humanitarian airlift, organized by Nova Ukraine and regional partners, included vital hospital equipment, various medical supplies, and first aid kits. At the send-off event at Seattle-Tacoma International Airport with Consul General of Ukraine Dmytro Kushneruk and leaders of local Ukrainian communities, Inslee highlighted Washington's commitment to aiding Ukraine and welcomed Ukrainian refugees to the state.

In 2023, Inslee praised the Washington House of Representatives' passage of a bill banning assault weapons. In 2023, several conservative organizations sued the Washington state government over SB5599, a bill Inslee signed into law that permits youth shelters to notify state authorities instead of parents when a minor seeks medical treatments such as abortion, puberty blockers, or gender-reassignment surgery. Critics of the bill argue that it infringes on parental rights protected by the First and Fourteenth Amendments, claiming it deprives parents of their "fundamental right to direct the care and upbringing of their children" and their rights to the free exercise of religion, due process, free speech, and equal protection.

In March 2024, Inslee signed legislation supported by animal rights and welfare activists making Washington the first state to ban the commercial farming of octopuses. Legislation to ban octopus farming was later adopted in California and proposed in the U.S. Senate.

On his last day in office, Inslee granted triple murderer Timothy Pauley parole after previously rejecting Pauley's parole in 2022; this decision was later reversed by his successor, fellow Democratic Governor Bob Ferguson.

== 2020 presidential campaign ==
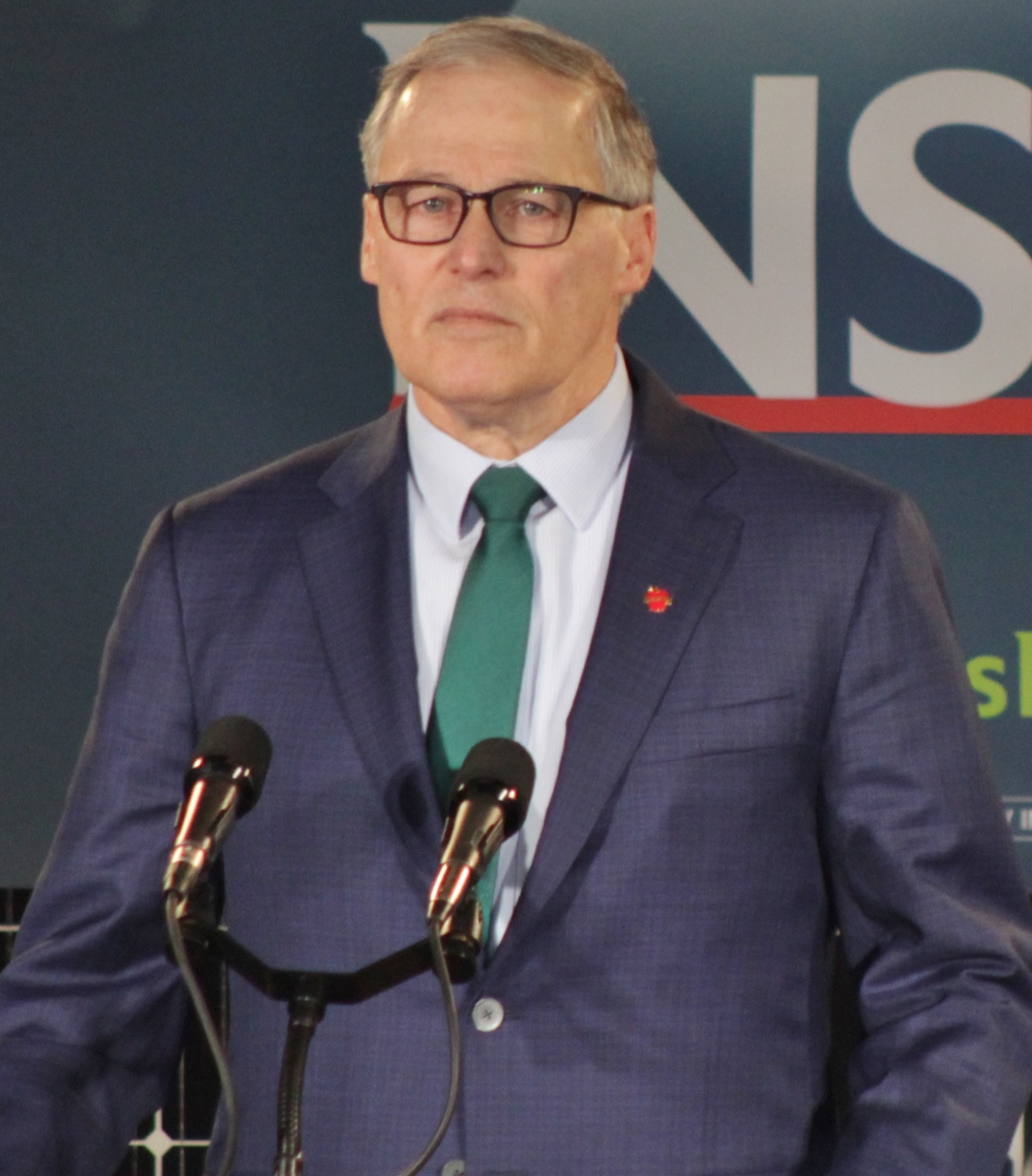
Inslee declaring his candidacy for president

Throughout 2018, speculation rose that Inslee might run for president of the United States in the 2020 election. He garnered national attention because of Washington v. Trump, a lawsuit challenging the first Trump Administration's order to ban people from seven Muslim-majority countries from entering the United States. While Inslee was chair of the Democratic Governors Association, Democrats gained seven net governorships in the 2018 gubernatorial elections, further propelling him into the national spotlight and fueling speculation that he would run. Inslee cited climate change as his primary motivation for running, strongly criticizing the Trump Administration's policies.

In January 2019, reports surfaced that Inslee was beginning to form an exploratory committee, the first step in a campaign. Inslee was a dark-horse candidate; initially, he was rarely included in polling for the primary, was not well known outside Washington, and made few trips to early primary states such as Iowa and New Hampshire. But he pointed to former Presidents Jimmy Carter and Bill Clinton, calling them "pretty much unknown governors of small states" and adding, "this is a wide-open field. No one has a lock on this. No one has a total crystal ball as to what the nation wants."

Inslee announced his candidacy for president on March 1, 2019, saying he would focus on combating climate change. His campaign requested a debate focused on climate change. The Democratic National Committee denied the request, but 53 of its voting members wrote an open letter protesting that decision.

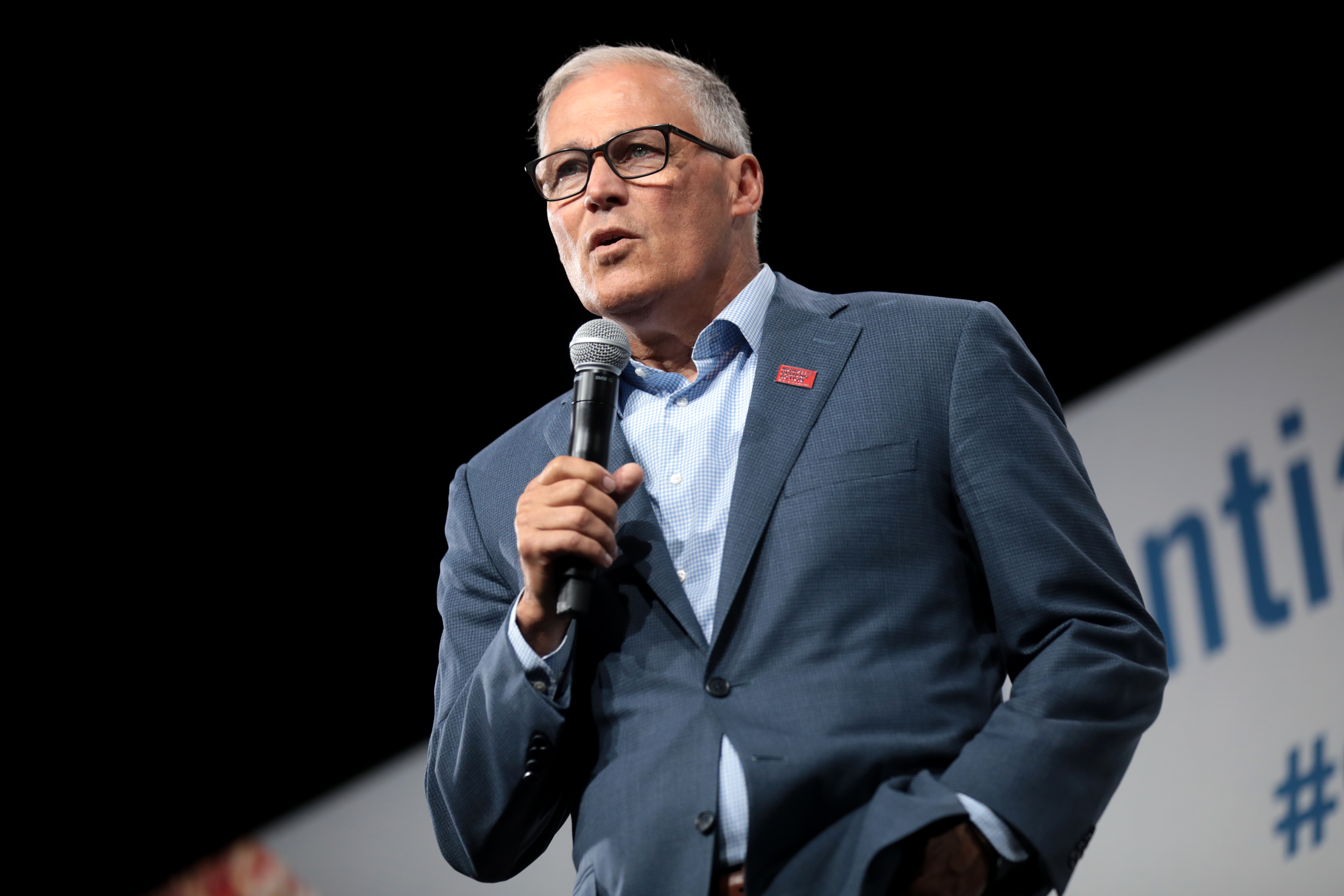
Inslee speaking at the Presidential Gun Sense Forum in Iowa in 2019

Facing poor polling numbers and seeing no path to victory, Inslee announced the suspension of his campaign on The Rachel Maddow Show on August 21, 2019, and announced the following day that he would run for a third term as governor in the 2020 election. Inslee endorsed Joe Biden for the presidency on April 22, 2020.

== Electoral history ==
| Date | Position | Status | Opponent | Result | Vote share | Opponent vote share |
|---|---|---|---|---|---|---|
| 1988 | WA Representative | Open seat | Lynn Carmichael (R) | Elected | 52% | 48% |
| 1990 | WA Representative | Incumbent | Ted Mellotte (R) | Re-elected | 62% | 38% |
| 1992 | U.S. Representative | Open seat | Doc Hastings (R) | Elected | 51% | 49% |
| 1994 | U.S. Representative | Incumbent | Doc Hastings (R) | Defeated | 47% | 53% |
| 1996 | WA Governor | Open seat primary | Gary Locke (D), others | Defeated | 10% | |
| 1998 | U.S. Representative | Challenger | Rick White (R) | Elected | 50% | 44% |
| 2000 | U.S. Representative | Incumbent | Dan McDonald (R) | Re-elected | 55% | 43% |
| 2002 | U.S. Representative | Incumbent | Joe Marine (R) | Re-elected | 56% | 41% |
| 2004 | U.S. Representative | Incumbent | Randy Eastwood (R) | Re-elected | 62% | 36% |
| 2006 | U.S. Representative | Incumbent | Larry W. Ishmael (R) | Re-elected | 68% | 32% |
| 2008 | U.S. Representative | Incumbent | Larry W. Ishmael (R) | Re-elected | 68% | 32% |
| 2010 | U.S. Representative | Incumbent | James Watkins (R) | Re-elected | 58% | 42% |
| 2012 | WA Governor | Open seat | Rob McKenna (R) | Elected | 52% | 48% |
| 2016 | WA Governor | Incumbent | Bill Bryant (R) | Re-elected | 54% | 45% |
| 2020 | WA Governor | Incumbent | Loren Culp (R) | Re-elected | 57% | 43% |

== Publications ==
=== Books ===
- Jay Inslee and Bracken Hendricks, Apollo's Fire: Igniting America's Clean Energy Economy, Island Press (October 1, 2007), ISBN 978-1-59726-175-3

=== Articles ===
- "Climate Change Is a Winning Campaign Issue—and President Trump Knows It", The New York Times, July 28, 2019

U.S. House of Representatives
| Preceded by Sid Morrison | Member of the U.S. House of Representatives from Washington's 4th congressional district 1993–1995 | Succeeded by Doc Hastings |
| Preceded by Rick White | Member of the U.S. House of Representatives from Washington's 1st congressional district 1999–2012 | Succeeded by Suzan DelBene |
Party political offices
| Preceded by Christine Gregoire | Democratic nominee for Governor of Washington; 2012, 2016, 2020 | Succeeded by Bob Ferguson |
| Preceded by Dan Malloy | Chair of the Democratic Governors Association; 2017–2018 | Succeeded by Gina Raimondo |
Political offices
| Preceded by Christine Gregoire | Governor of Washington; 2013–2025 | Succeeded by Bob Ferguson |
U.S. order of precedence (ceremonial)
| Preceded by Christine Gregoire as Former Governor | Order of precedence of the United States; Within Washington | Succeeded by Jack Markell as Former Governor |
| Preceded by Christine Gregoire as Former Governor | Order of precedence of the United States; Outside Washington | Succeeded by Butch Otter as Former Governor |
