= Chambers Building =

Chambers Building may refer to:

== Australia ==
- Central Chambers (Fremantle), Western Australia

== Canada ==
- Central Chambers (Ottawa), Ontario, a National Historic Site

== Pakistan ==
- KHCAA Golden Jubilee Chamber Complex, Kochi

== United Kingdom ==
- Oriel Chambers, Liverpool, England
- Crypt Chambers, Chester, England
- Dunfermline City Chambers, Scotland
- Glasgow City Chambers, Glasgow, Scotland
- Chambers Institution, Peebles, Scotland, home to the Tweeddale Museum and Gallery

== United States ==
- Richard H. Chambers United States Court of Appeals, Pasadena, California
- Chambers Building (Kansas City, Missouri), listed on the National Register of Historic Places (NRHP)
- Wilson–Chambers Mortuary, Portland, Oregon, NRHP-listed
- Chambers Building (Penn State), one of Penn State's academic buildings
- Farnsworth & Chambers Building, Houston, Texas, listed on the NRHP in Harris County, Texas
- Broadway–Chambers Building, 277 Broadway, New York City, designed by Cass Gilbert
- Chambers Building, a historic building of Davidson College

== See also ==
- Central Chambers (disambiguation)
- City Chambers (disambiguation)
- Chambers House (disambiguation)
- Chambers Island Light, Fish Creek, Wisconsin, U.S., NRHP-listed
- Andy Chambers Ranch Historic District, Grand Teton Park, Wyoming, U.S., NRHP-listed
