= Apollo's Fire (book) =

Book by Jay Inslee

- Author: Jay Inslee; Bracken Hendricks
- Publisher: Island Press
- Publication date: 2007
- Pages: 387 pp.
- ISBN: 978-1-59726-175-3
- OCLC: 150255581

Apollo's Fire: Igniting America's Clean Energy Economy is a 2007 book by Washington State Governor Jay Inslee and researcher Bracken Hendricks. Inslee first proposed an Apollo-scale program, designed to galvanize the nation around the urgent goal of solving the environmental and energy crises, in the Seattle Post-Intelligencer in 2002. Eventually, Inslee co-authored Apollo's Fire, in which he says that through improved federal policies, the United States can wean itself off of its dependence on foreign oil and fossil fuel, create millions of green-collar worker jobs, and stop global warming. Along these lines, he has been a prominent supporter of the Apollo Alliance.

In "Chapter 2: Reinventing the car", Apollo's Fire highlights innovative efforts such as CalCars, founded in 2002 to promote plug-in hybrid electric vehicles (PHEVs), charged by off-peak electricity from renewable energy sources, as a key to addressing oil dependence and global warming worldwide.

Former U.S. president Bill Clinton wrote the foreword of the book.

== Reception ==
A review of the book in Publishers Weekly described the book as an "energetic articulation of a clean-energy future." A review of the book in Whatcom Watch wrote that "First, we owe Inslee and Hendricks standing applause for undertaking the effort to collect data and write this book. For organization, background, writing and inspiration I’d give them an A+. For motivation and detailed recommendations, they still have some work to do." Michael McGinn credited the book for establishing Inslee as a "serious thinker on climate."

== See also ==
- List of books about renewable energy
- List of books about energy issues
- Renewable energy commercialization
- Sustainable business
