= Justice Chambers (disambiguation) =

Justice M. Chambers (1908–1982) was a World War II United States Marine Corps officer and Medal of Honor recipient.

Justice Chambers may also refer to:

- Ezekiel F. Chambers (1788–1867), judge of the Maryland Court of Appeals
- George Chambers (Pennsylvania politician) (1786–1866), associate justice of the Pennsylvania Supreme Court
- Robert Chambers (English judge) (1737–1803), chief justice of the Supreme Court of Judicature at Fort William, Bengal
- Tom Chambers (judge) (1943–2013), associate justice of the Washington Supreme Court
- William Lea Chambers (1852–1933), United States-appointed chief justice of Samoa

== See also ==
- Judge Chambers (disambiguation)
