= City Chambers =

City Chambers can refer to:

- Dundee City Chambers
- Dunfermline City Chambers
- Edinburgh City Chambers
- Glasgow City Chambers

== See also ==
- Chambers Building (disambiguation)
