= Dmytro Kushneruk =

Ukrainian diplomat (born 1983)

- Дмитро́ Володи́мирович Кушнеру́к

Consul General of Ukraine in San Francisco
- Incumbent
- Assumed office July 2020
- Preceded by: Oleksandr Krotenko

Personal details
- Born: 16 January 1983 (age 43) Odesa, Ukrainian SSR, Soviet Union
- Citizenship: Ukraine
- Spouse: married
- Children: 2
- Education: Taras Shevchenko National University of Kyiv, National University Odesa Law Academy

Dmytro Kushneruk (Ukrainian: Дмитро́ Володи́мирович Кушнеру́к; born January 16, 1983) is a Ukrainian diplomat, currently serving as Consul General of Ukraine in San Francisco. Kushneruk holds the diplomatic rank of Extraordinary and Plenipotentiary Envoy First class. During Russian invasion of Ukraine, Kushneruk successfully negotiated and coordinated material support to Ukraine from several U.S. States: with the Governors of California, Washington State and Utah, with the Arizona House of Representatives and with the Californian city of Sacramento. He also negotiated political support for U.S. military aid with U.S. representative Ro Khanna from California.

== Education ==
Kushneruk is a graduate of Taras Shevchenko National University of Kyiv, holding a Master's degree in International Law.

== Diplomatic career ==
Kushneruk joined diplomatic service in 2006 and worked at Office of the President of Ukraine. In 2012-2014 Kushneruk was posted as Counsellor at the Permanent mission of Ukraine to the United Nations in New York City. In 2014-2020 Kushneruk served as Deputy Chief of Protocol to the President of Ukraine. Kushneruk was appointed Consul General of Ukraine in San Francisco in July 2020.

== Activities during Russia's invasion of Ukraine ==
During Russia's invasion of Ukraine, Kushneruk coordinated with Governor Gavin Newsom the scope and extent of California's efforts to support the people and government of Ukraine. Kushneruk also coordinated aid to Ukraine with Governor Jay Inslee of Washington State and the City of Seattle, with Arizona lawmakers as well as with Governor Spencer Cox and church leaders of Utah. In a March 2022 meeting with the US Congressman Ro Khanna, Kushneruk successfully advocated for greater US military aid for Ukraine, particularly anti-tank weapons, anti-aircraft missiles and aircraft, but found disagreement on establishing a no-fly zone over Ukraine. Kushneruk personally received shipments of aid to Ukraine from California government agencies.

Kushneruk participated in street rallies and other events in the San Francisco Bay Area that bolstered support for Ukraine. He also contributed to sister-city relations between Ukrainian and Californian cities.

== See also ==
- Oksana Markarova
