= Jenkins Music Company Building =

- U.S. National Register of Historic Places
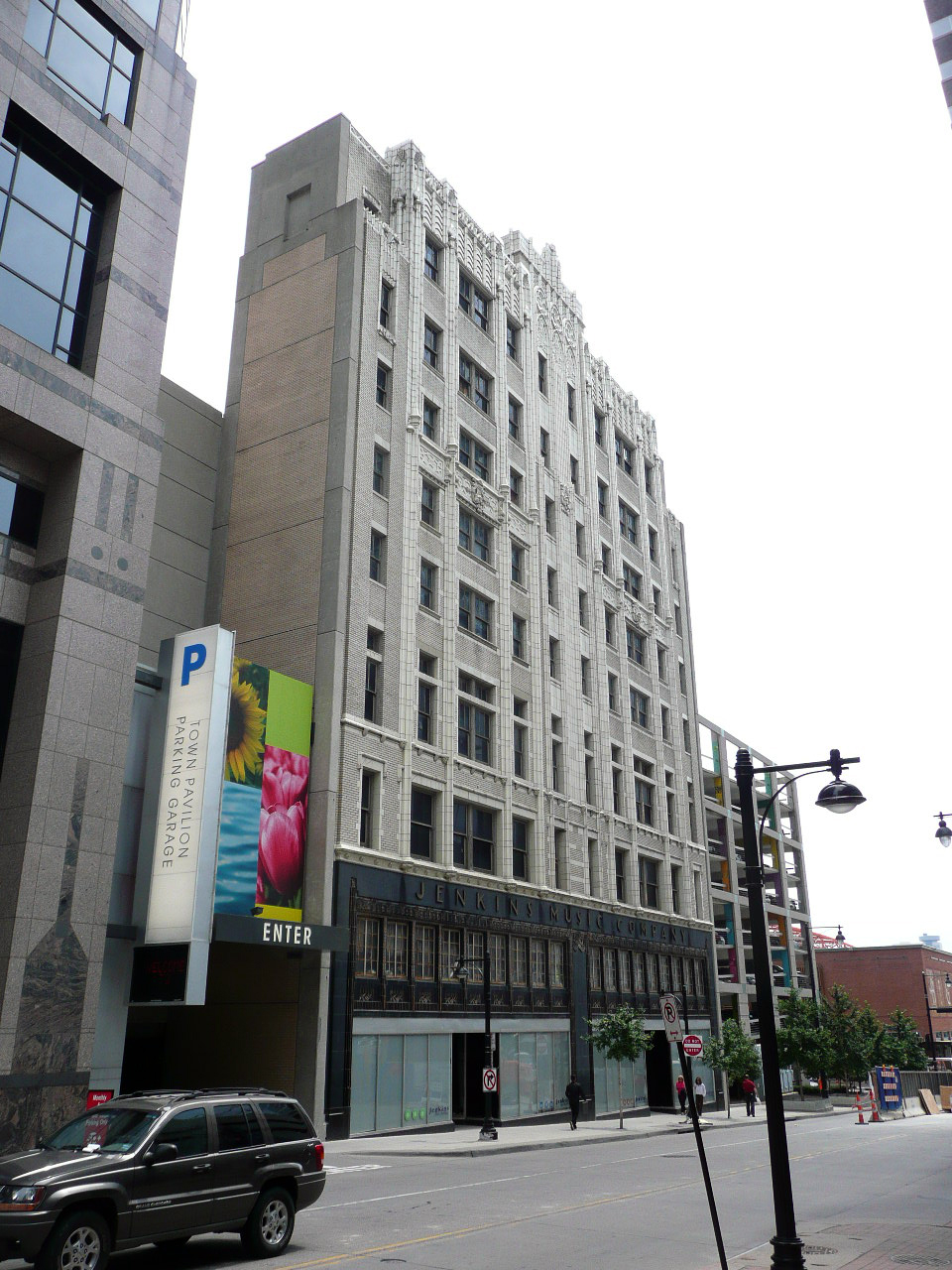
- Historic Jenkins Music Building in Kansas City, Missouri

- Location within Missouri Location within the United States
- Location: 1217–1223 Walnut St. Kansas City, Missouri
- Coordinates: 39°5′58″N 94°34′53″W
- Area: less than one acre
- Built: 1911
- Architect: Smith, Rea & Lovitt; Charles A. Smith
- Architectural style: Late Gothic Revival, Art Deco
- NRHP reference No.: 79001370
- Added to NRHP: March 2, 1979

The Jenkins Music Company Building is a historic building in the Kansas City Power and Light District in Kansas City, Missouri. Built in 1911, it is a significant example of unaltered, Modernistic style commercial architecture, combining Late Gothic Revival and Art Deco decorative elements. It was listed on the National Register of Historic Places in 1979.

The building was constructed in two phases. A six-story building, built in 1911–12, was enlarged in 1931–1932 with an eight-story, south unit. Two additional stories were added atop the 1911-1912 unit as part of the enlargement. The building, constructed on a level grade, faces west onto Walnut Street. Modernistic in style, the building is an amalgam of Late Gothic Revival and Art Deco design elements. The most ornate area of the building's exterior; is the west facade, with embellishments and eighth story step-backs creating a strong vertical and rectilinear effect.

The building is currently controlled by Kansas City-based real estate firm Copaken Brooks and is planned to be used as a mixed commercial and residential property sometime in the future.

== History ==
The Jenkins Music Company has been a musical institution in Kansas City since its founding in 1878 by John Woodward Jenkins. During the 1880s Jenkins brought in his son, John Wesley Jenkins to form the J.W. Jenkins and Son Music Company.

Apparently following the death of Jenkins Sr, in approximately 1890, J.W. Jenkins Jr., with his brothers, Frederick B. and Clifford W., formed the J.W. Jenkins' Sons Music Company. During the decade of the 1890s, the Jenkins Company became one of the largest manufacturers of guitars and mandolins in the world and one of the most distinguished publishers of sheet music in the nation. By 1931, the firm reorganized and became the Jenkins Music Company. Following three successive moves, the firm completed in 1912, a six-story fireproof building at 1217 Walnut Street, designed by Smith, Rea & Lovitt and built by Harvey Stiver.

In 1932, the enlargement of the 1912 unit was completed from plans by Charles A. Smith and the construction was executed by A. J. Rector Construction Company. The newly expanded building boasted of an intricate ventilation and air condition system, plus several interior features that enhanced the business aspects of the music company. Each floor was utilized for the merchandising of musical instruments and supplies. One unusual feature of the building was a small space on the fifth floor devoted to a remote control broadcasting studio. The eighth floor contained Steinway Hall, an auditorium and recital hall, which had a seating capacity for approximately 240 people.

In 1947, the Jenkins Music Company sponsored the first summer conference of new music, which brought several hundred of the nation's leading music teachers, composers, and performers to the event. The participants of the Jenkins Conferences, held in the building, discussed musical composition, materials, instruction and new trends in music. The conference was held for eight successive years.

At its height, during the 1950s, the Jenkins Music Company employed nearly 700 persons and operated throughout Kansas, Missouri, Oklahoma, Texas and Arkansas under the management of the Jenkins family. By August 1971, due to financial difficulties caused by strong competition, the Jenkins Company filed for bankruptcy. In July, 1973, David Richardson, founder of Rich Music Inc., acquired the Jenkins Company, later closing a majority of the former Jenkins Music Stores in the city and the surrounding area.

== Facade (1972–1978) ==
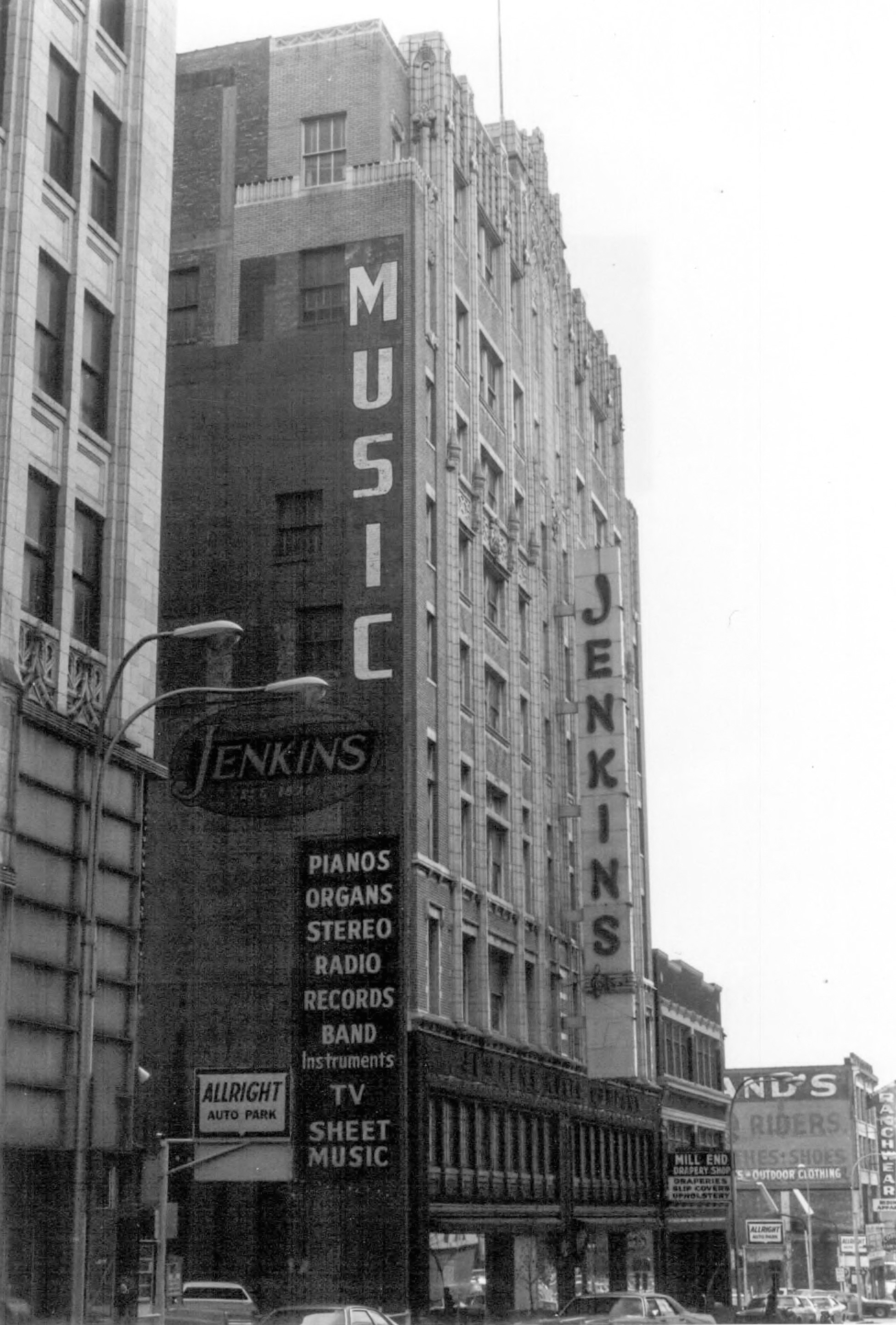
Northwest Corner

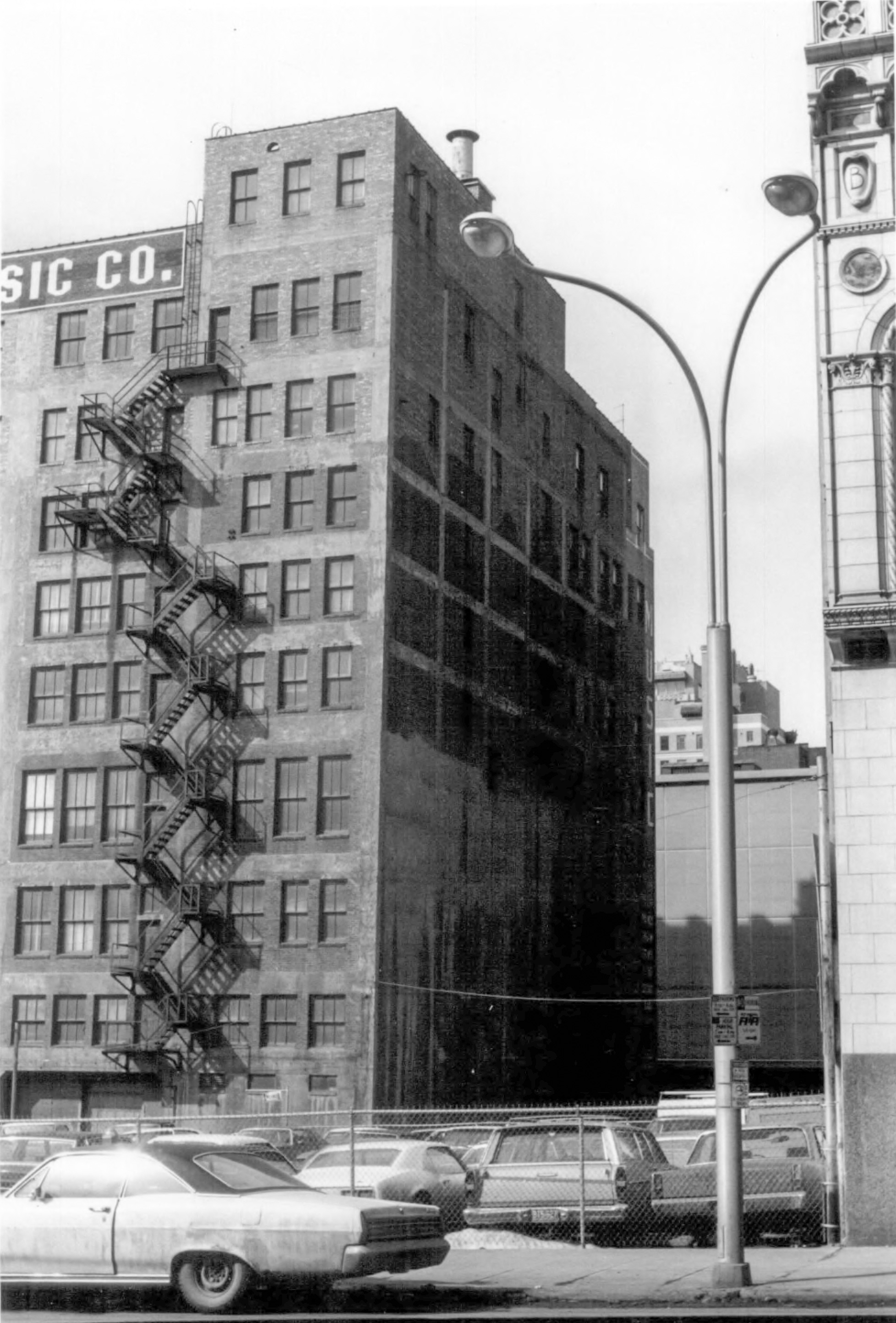
Northeast Facade

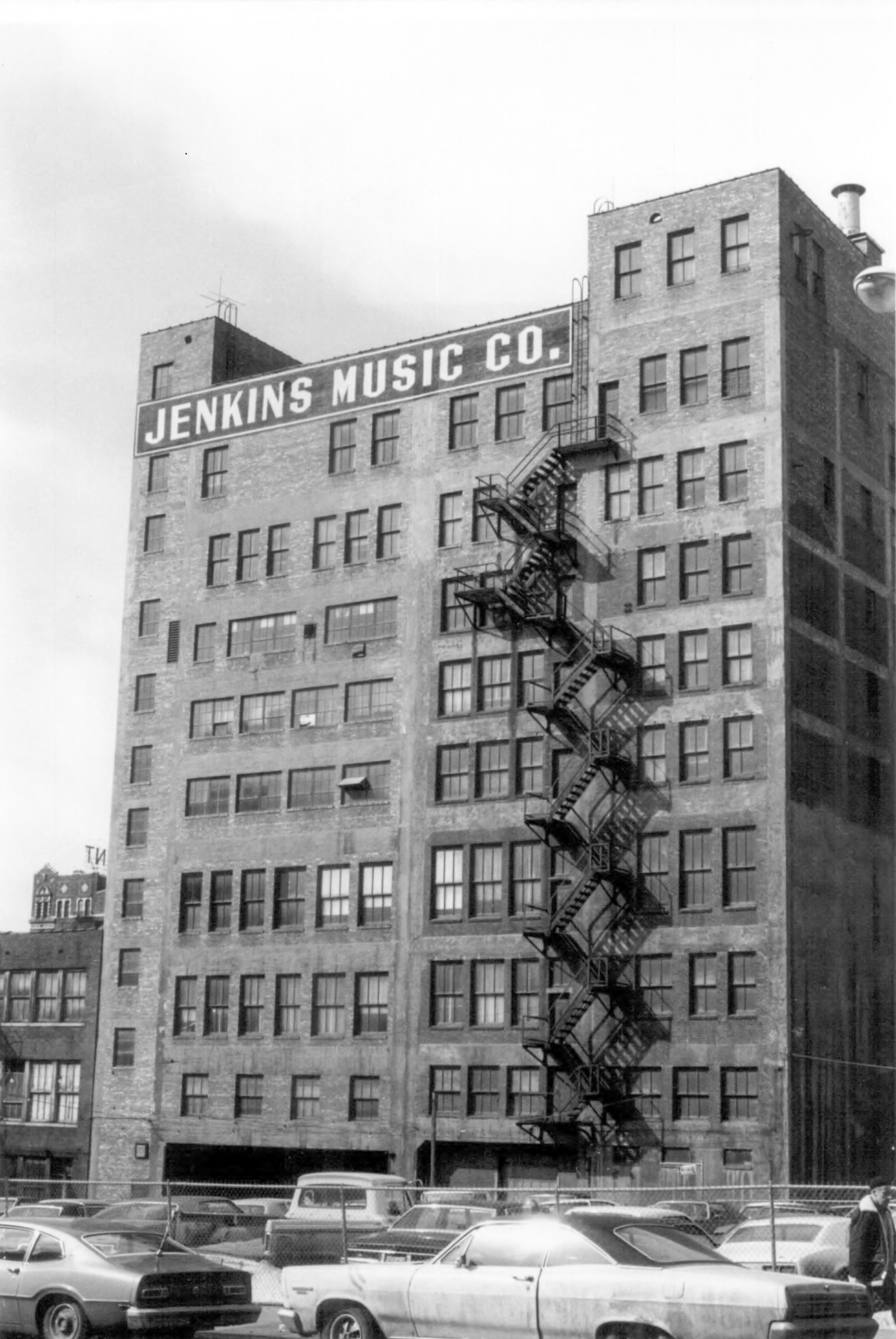
East Facade

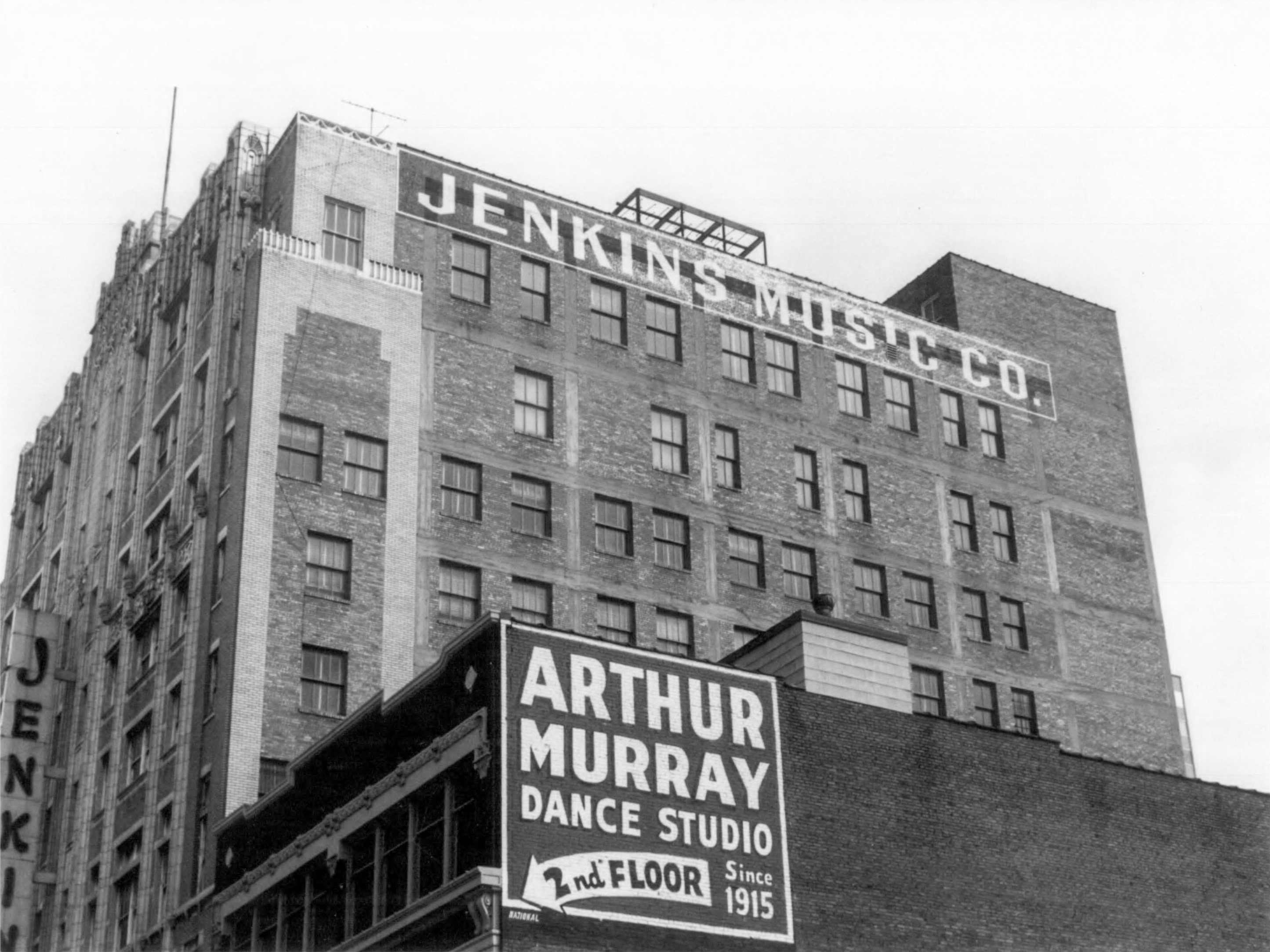
South Facade

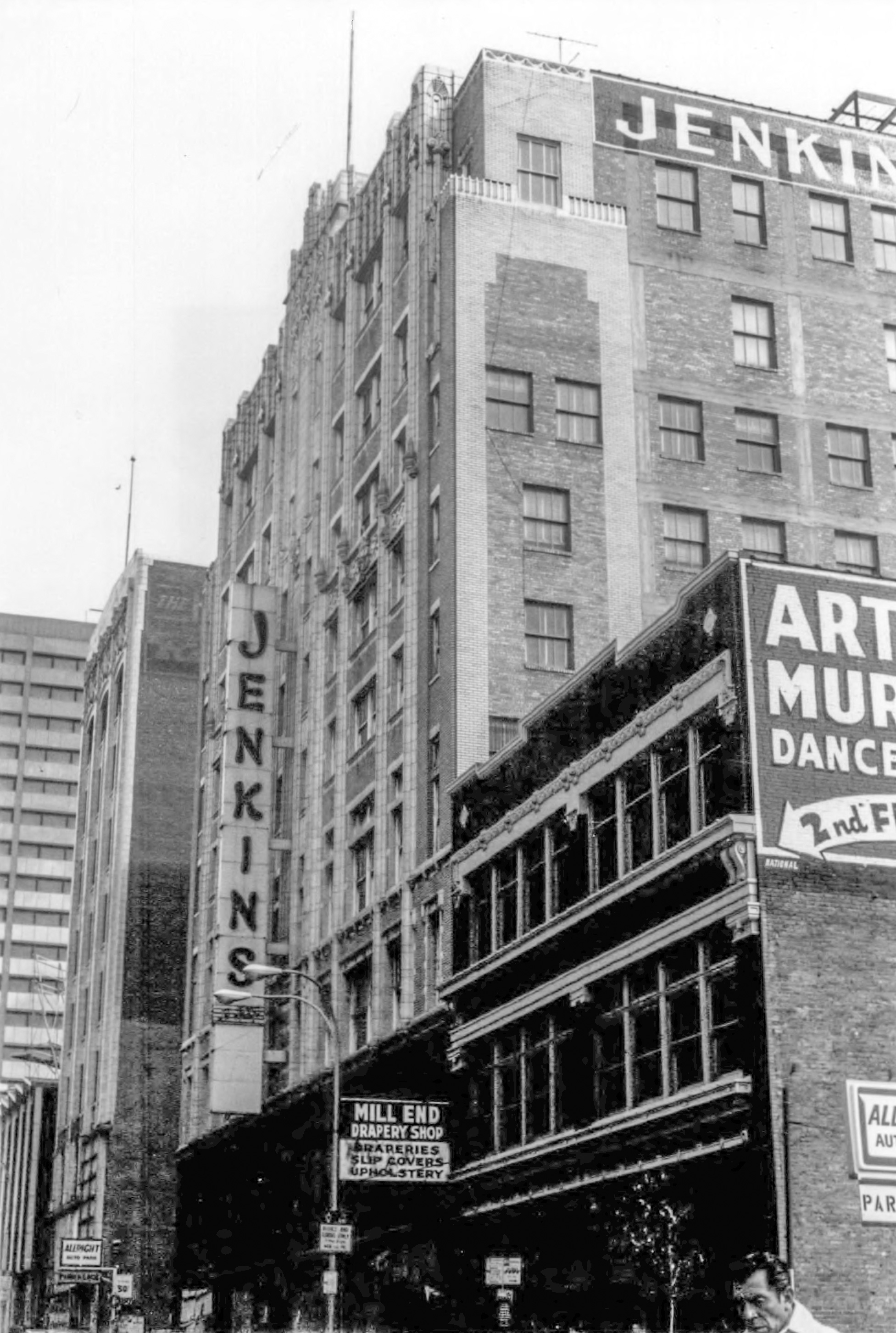
Southwest Corner

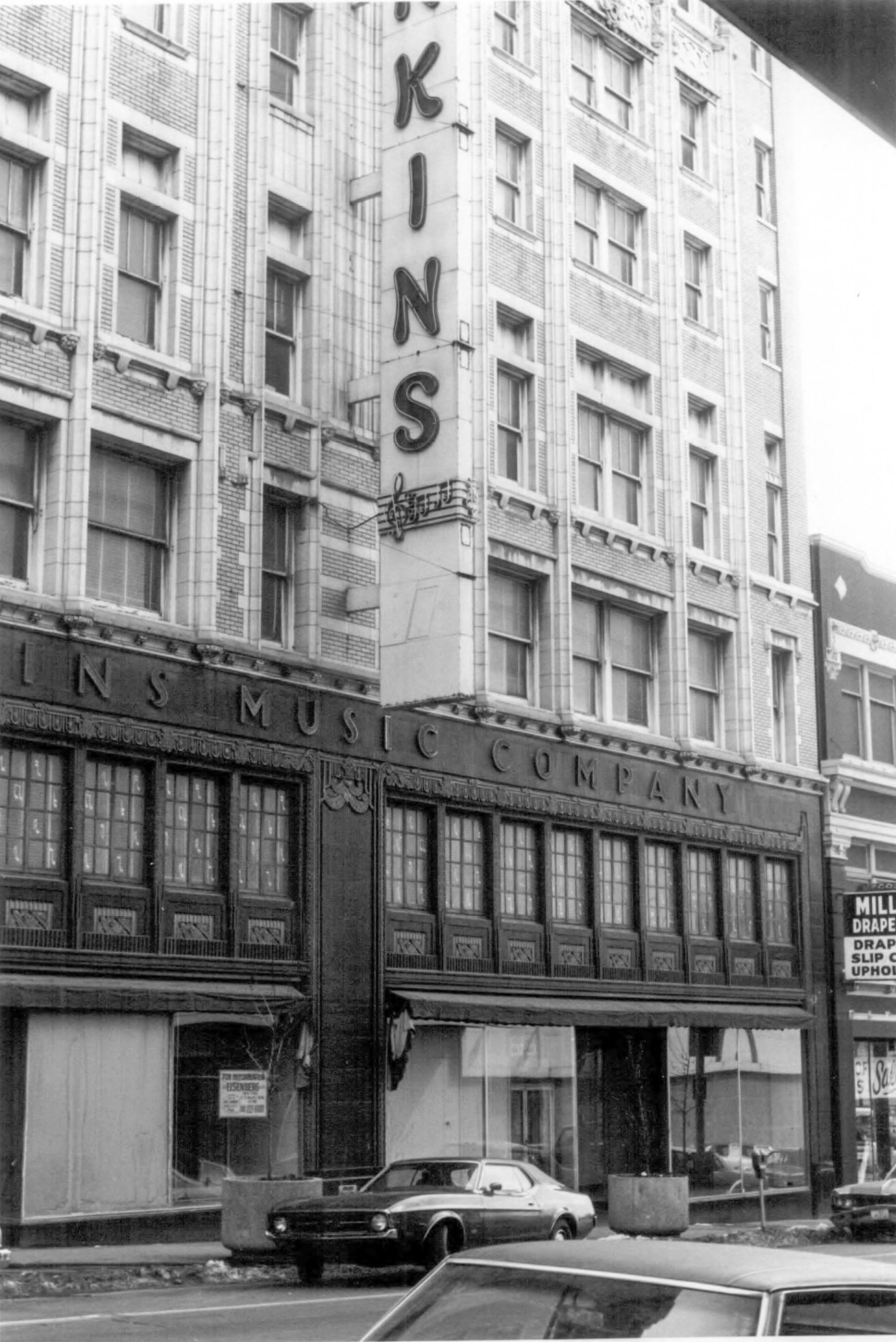
West Facade

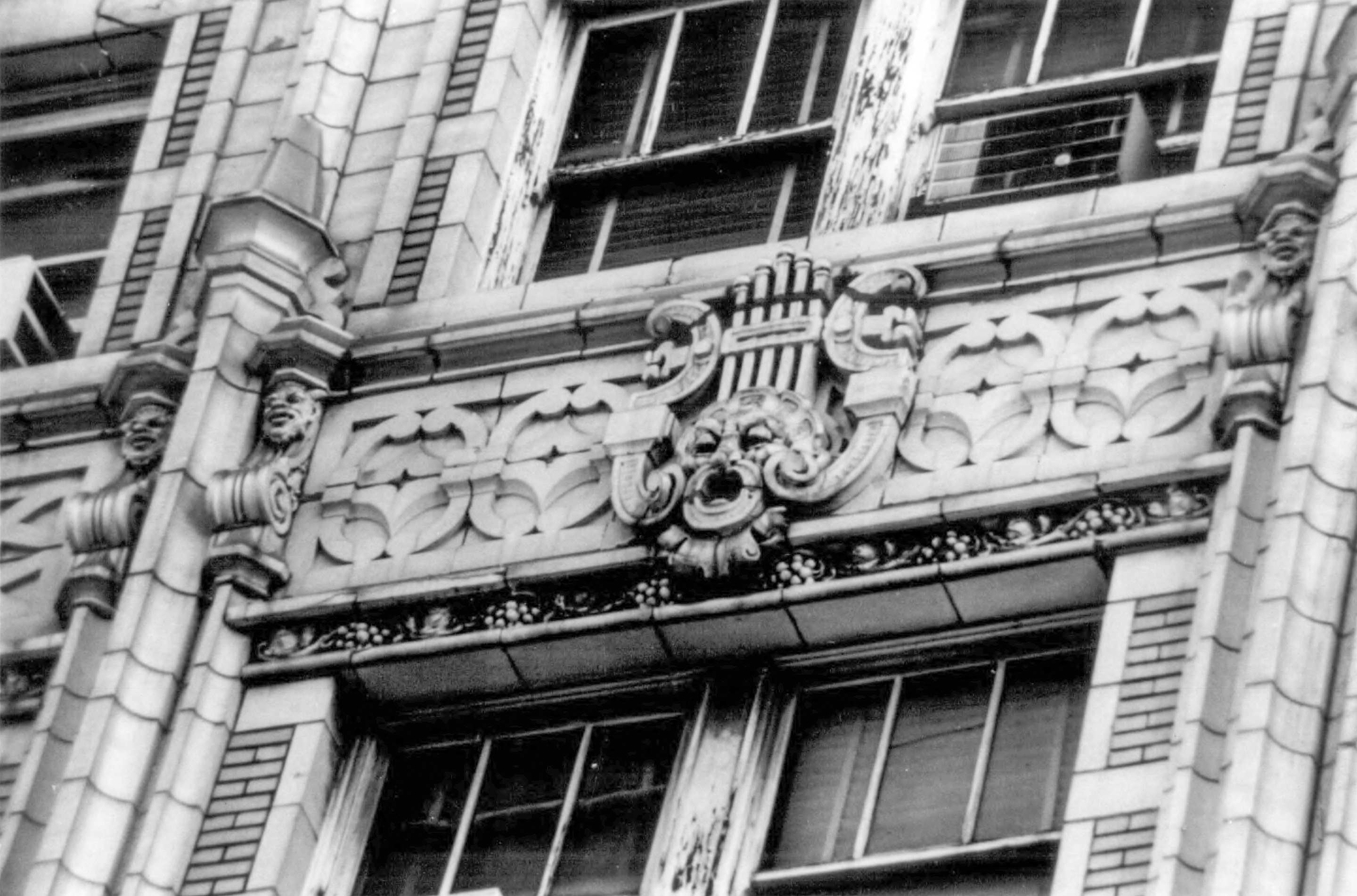
West Facade, Spandrel Detail

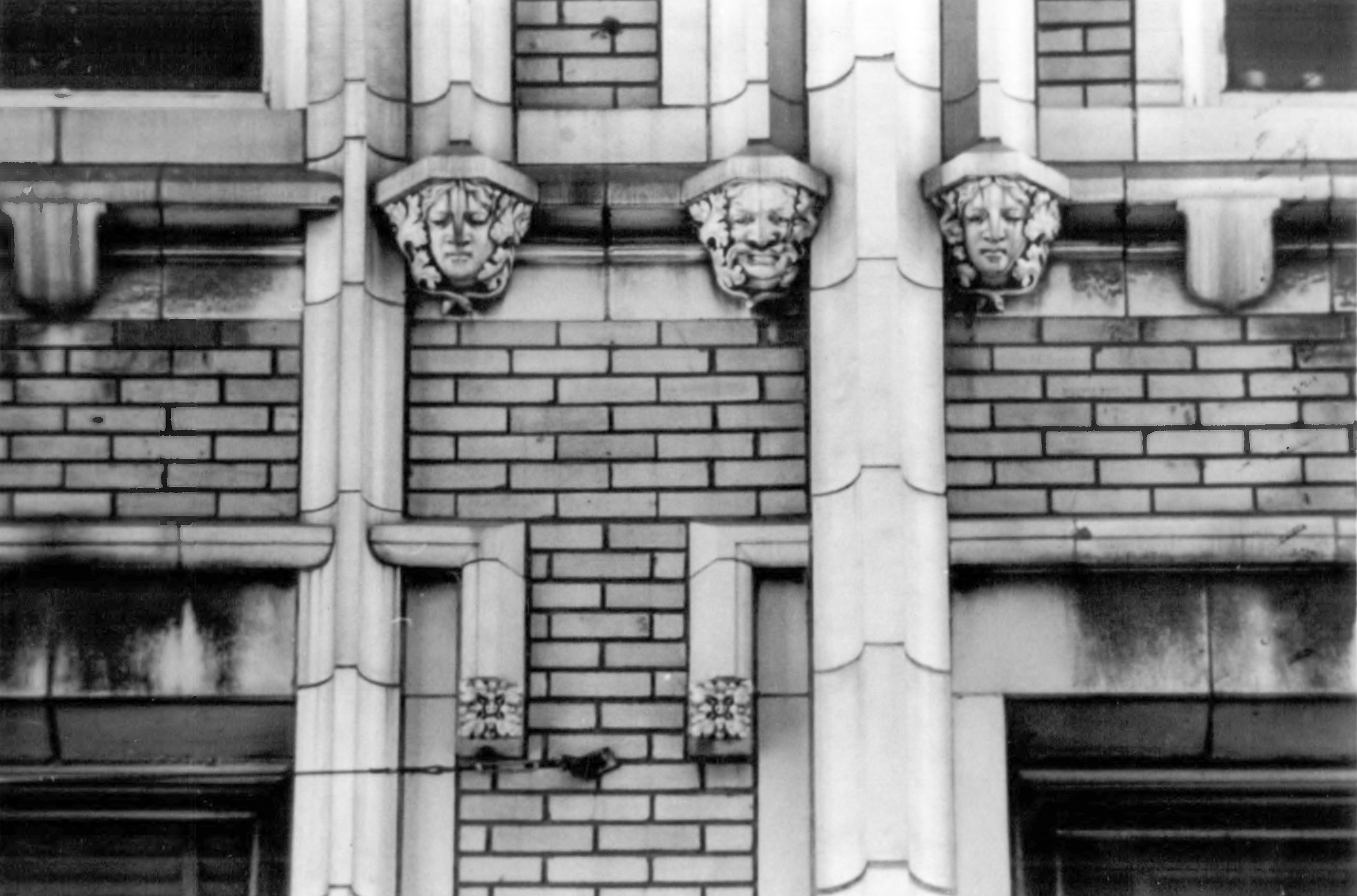
West Facade, Spandrel Detail 2

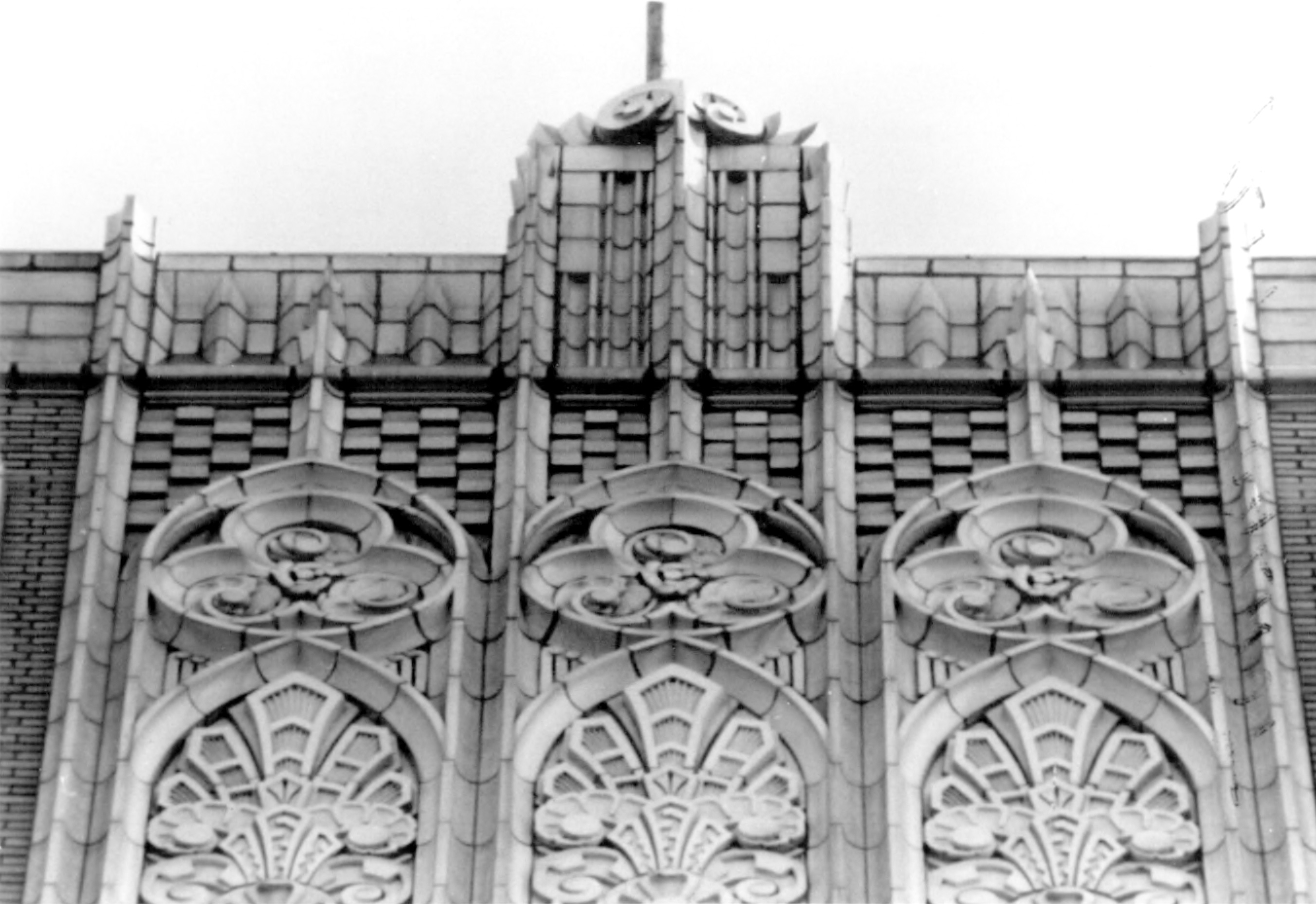
West Facade, Parapet Detail

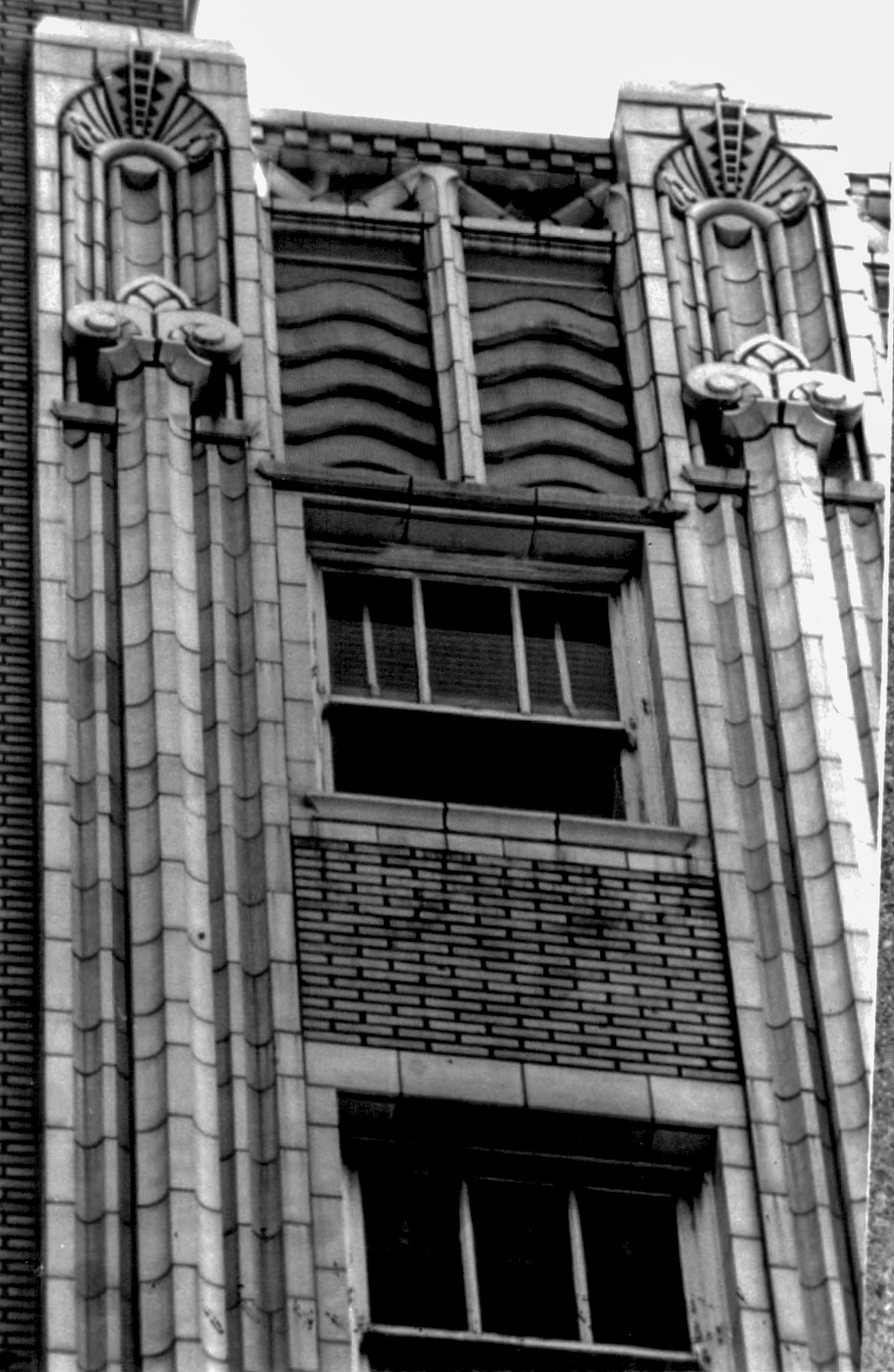
West Facade, Parapet Detail 2
