= Charles A. Smith (architect) =

American architect (1866–1948)

Charles Ashley Smith
- Born: 1866; Ohio
- Died: 1948 (aged 81–82); Kansas City, Missouri

Charles Ashley Smith (March 22, 1866 – 1948), was an American architect who worked mainly in Kansas City, Missouri.

He is given credit for architectural innovations in schools that improved ventilation and cleanliness, and which were adopted widely elsewhere.

He was born in Steubenville, Ohio. His father Augustine L. Smith was a building contractor. Charles worked for architect William F. Hackney of the firm Bell & Hackney in Des Moines, Iowa. In 1898, Smith became the official architect for Kansas City's School Board.

== Career ==
The firm of Smith, Rea & Lovitt has been a major contributor to the creation of some of Kansas City's important buildings, since their formation in 1910. The firm initially consisted of Charles A. Smith, Frank S. Rea and Walter U. Lovitt Jr.

As senior partner of the firm, Smith distinguished himself as an architect of national repute. Following Smith's arrival in Kansas City in 1893, he became a junior partner with William F. Hackney, architect for the School District of Kansas City. Smith acquired the position as School Board Architect, following Hackney's death in 1898. For nearly forty years until his retirement in 1936, Smith designed all of the school buildings in the city, whose innovations, particularly in ventilation and sanitation, were adopted by other school systems throughout the country.

In approximately 1902, Smith was joined by architect Frank S. Rea and later, in about 1910, by architect Walter U. Lovitt Jr. During the ten years of the firm's existence, Smith, Rea & Lovitt designed such notable Kansas City buildings as the Rialto Building, the Ridge Arcade, the Ivanhoe Temple, the Isis Theater/Wirthnam Building, the Firestone Building and the Rothenberg & Schloss Company Building. All of these structures still survive.

The firm of Smith, Rea &, Lovitt dissolved in 1920. Afterwards, Smith practiced alone, outliving Rea and Lovitt. Smith died in Kansas City in 1948.

== Works ==
Smith was involved with a number of buildings listed on the U.S. National Register of Historic Places. These include (and attribution with variations):

- Attucks School, 1815 Woodland Ave. Kansas City, Missouri (Smith, Charles A.)
- Bonner Springs High School, 200 East Third Bonner Springs, Kansas (Smith, Charles A.)
- Chambers Building, 25 E. 12th St. Kansas City, Missouri (Smith, Charles A.)
- Hiland Telephone Exchange Building, 1020 E. 63rd St. Kansas City, Missouri (Smith, Charles)
- IOOF Liberty Lodge No. 49, 16-18 E. Franklin St. Liberty, Missouri (Smith, Charles A.)
- Jenkins Music Company Building, 1217-1223 Walnut St. Kansas City, Missouri (Smith Charles A.)
- Kansas City, Missouri Western Union Telegraph Building, 100-114 E. 7th St. Kansas City, Missouri (Smith, Charles A.)
- Osceola Public School Building, at the junction of Fifth and Pine Sts. Osceola, Missouri (Smith, Charles A.)
- Professional Building, 1101-1107 Grand Ave. Kansas City, Missouri (Smith, Charles A.)
- Switzer School Buildings, generally bounded by Madison Ave. and Summit St., 18th to 20th Sts. Kansas City, Missouri (Smith, Charles A.)
- Tower of Memories, 8500 W. Twenty-ninth Ave. Denver, Colorado (Charles A. Smith, Fisher & Fisher, (John Monroe)
- One or more buildings in Howard Neighborhood Historic District, roughly bounded by SE 5th St., SE Green St., SE 7th St., and SE Miller St. Lee's Summit, Missouri (Smith, Charles A.)
- Liberty High School now Heritage Middle School, 600 W Kansas St, Liberty, Missouri. This building was re-built after a fire burned down the historic Women's Collage, a new High School was built in the same location. (Charles A. Smith)

== Titanic salvage ==
In 1914, Smith proposed a salvage idea regarding the Titanic. The plan involved a custom designed unmanned submarine which would have featured electromagnets that would attach themselves to the hull of the liner. Upon attaching to the hull the apparatus would release a buoy showing the location of the ship. Once this was done other magnets would do the same thing. His thought was that with enough magnets he could then raise the ship with winches attached to barges. Most consider Smith's idea to be the most plausible of all ideas to raise the lost Titanic.
