= IOOF Liberty Lodge No. 49 =

- U.S. National Register of Historic Places
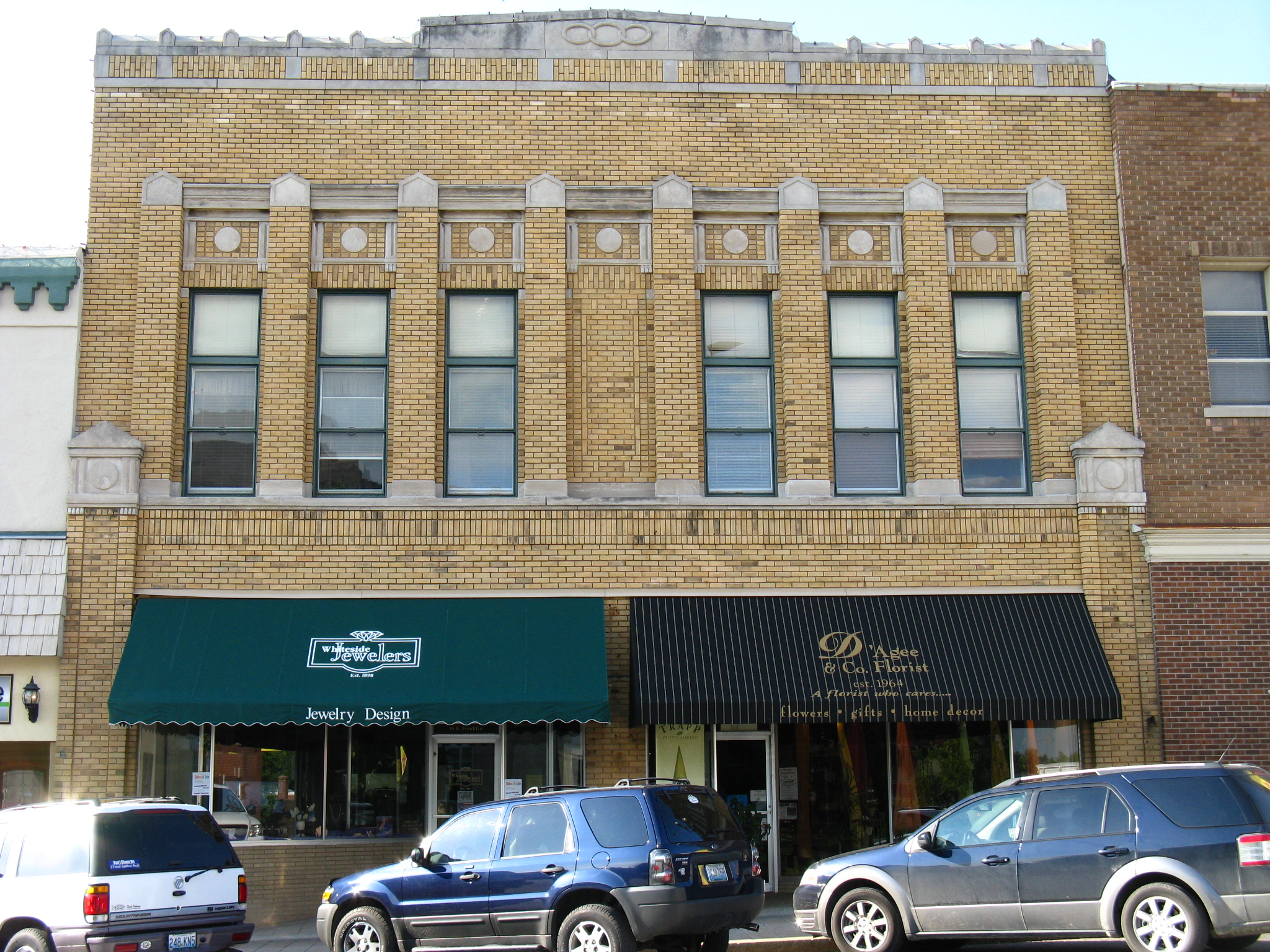
- The lodge, seen from East Franklin Street

- Location within Missouri Location within the United States
- Location: 16--18 E. Franklin St., Liberty, Missouri
- Coordinates: 39.2470°N 94.4197°W
- Area: less than one acre
- Built: 1923
- Built by: Miller-Stauch Construction Co.
- Architect: Charles A. Smith
- Architectural style: Moderne, Early 20th-century commercial
- MPS: Liberty MPS
- NRHP reference No.: 92001677
- Added to NRHP: December 28, 1992

The IOOF Liberty Lodge No. 49, built in 1923, is a historic commercial building in Liberty, Missouri. It served historically as an Independent Order of Odd Fellows meeting hall and as a specialty store. The building was listed on the National Register of Historic Places in 1992.

== History ==
The Liberty Odd Fellows lodge had been using the building at 20 East Franklin for its meetings since 1889. In need of more space, they constructed a second building next door at 16-18 East Franklin, and like its first building, leased the first floor to commercial businesses and used the second floor as a meeting hall. The original building was then used as a banquet hall.

The store at 16 East Franklin storefront has housed the Whiteside Jewelry since the 1920s. The other store front in the building has also held long term tenants, including a variety store and a florist.

== Architecture ==
The Liberty Lodge building is a two-story brick rectangular structure with a parapet top and a flat roof. It is clad in light-colored glazed brick. The center of the parapet has the Odd Fellows interlocking ring symbol carved into the stone. The second floor has been altered into several individual offices.

The building's design is Moderne architecture, early 20th-century commercial. It was designed by architect Charles A. Smith. Smith, a well known local architect, designed over fifty schools in the Kansan city area, as well as some buildings at William Jewell College in Liberty.

The building was added to the National Register of Historic Places as an example of combination of building uses typical to small towns, and for its association with architect Charles A. Smith.
