= Chambers (ship) =

Several vessels have been named Chambers:

- Chambers (1776 ship) was launched in Bristol in 1776. She spent most of her brief career as a West Indiaman. An American privateer captured her in October 1782.
- Chambers (1781 ship) was launched in America in 1781, possibly under the same name. Chambers first appeared in Lloyd's Register in 1783. She traded between Liverpool and Africa, but is not listed as a slave ship. She foundered in 1792.
- Chambers (1794 ship) was launched at Liverpool in 1794. She was lost in 1795 as she was returning to Liverpool from Jamaica.

== See also ==
- USS Chambers (DE-391) was an Edsall-class destroyer escort in service with the United States Navy from 1943 to 1946 and from 1955 to 1960. From 1952 to 1954, she was loaned to the United States Coast Guard where she served as USCGC Chambers (WDE-491). She was finally scrapped in 1975.
