= Tom Chambers (judge) =

American judge

- Born: October 11, 1943; Wapato, Washington, U.S.
- Died: December 11, 2013 (aged 70); Olympia, Washington, U.S.
- Education: Yakima Valley Community College; Washington State University (BA); University of Washington School of Law (JD)
- Occupations: Lawyer, Washington Supreme Court justice
- Spouse: Judy
- Children: 3

Thomas Jefferson Chambers (October 11, 1943 – December 11, 2013) was an American lawyer who served as an associate justice of the Washington Supreme Court from 2000 to 2012.

== Early life and education ==
Chambers grew up in Yakima, where he worked at his father's automobile repair garage. He graduated from Wapato High School in 1962, and then attended Yakima Valley Community College. In 1966, he graduated with a B.A. degree from Washington State University, and in 1969 received a J.D. degree from the University of Washington School of Law. Father of Jolie, Jana and Tom Chambers. Grandfather of Zariya, Taliya, Siyana, Alanna, Spencer, and Rylee.

== Legal and judicial career ==
While in private practice, Chambers practiced personal injury law. On the bench, he continued his commitment to individual rights. Among his notable Supreme Court cases are Braam v. State of Washington (2003), concerning foster children's constitutional rights, State v. Monday, which held that it is prosecutorial misconduct for a prosecutor to appeal to racial bias, and State v. A.N.J. (2010), setting standards for public defender case loads.

Chambers served as president of both the Washington State Bar Association, 1996–1997, and the Washington State Trial Lawyers Association, 1985–1986.

Justice Chambers succeeded Justice Phil Talmadge on the court and was succeeded by Justice Sheryl Gordon McCloud.
