= Whatcom Watch =

- Type: Monthly newspaper
- Managing editor: Sally Hewitt
- Founded: May 1992
- Language: English
- Website: whatcomwatch.org

Whatcom Watch is a monthly volunteer-run newspaper in Whatcom County, Washington. The newspaper focuses on community and environmental issues along with political activism.

== History ==
The Whatcom Watch first published as a newsletter in May 1992. One of the organizers described it as "a giant written phone tree." Most of the free 650 copies, printed on green paper, were circulated by hand. The newspaper launched its own website in 1999.

== Awards ==
Articles in Whatcom Watch have won awards from the Washington Press Association Awards and the Society of Professional Journalists.
