= Chambers (1794 ship) =

18th century ship of Great Britain

History

Great Britain
- Name: Chambers
- Builder: Liverpool
- Launched: 1794
- Fate: Foundered March 1795

General characteristics
- Tons burthen: 198 (bm)
- Complement: 20
- Armament: 14 × 4-pounder guns

Chambers was a ship launched in 1794 in Liverpool. Captain Theophilus Bent acquired a letter of marque on 10 February 1794. Chambers first appeared in Lloyd's Register in 1794.

Year	Master	Owner	Trade	Source
1794	T.Bent	Rt.Bent	Liverpool–Africa	LR

A trade of Liverpool to Africa often signals participation in the Atlantic triangular slave trade. On the one hand, Chambers does not appear the pre-eminent database of trans-Atlantic slave voyages. On the other hand, Chambers, Bent, master, was lost off Wexford, Ireland in 1795 while sailing from Jamaica to Liverpool, which would represent the third segment of the triangular trade. She had arrived in Jamaica, from Africa, circa October 1794, a voyage that would represent the second leg of the trade.
