= Chambers Building (Kansas City, Missouri) =

- U.S. National Register of Historic Places
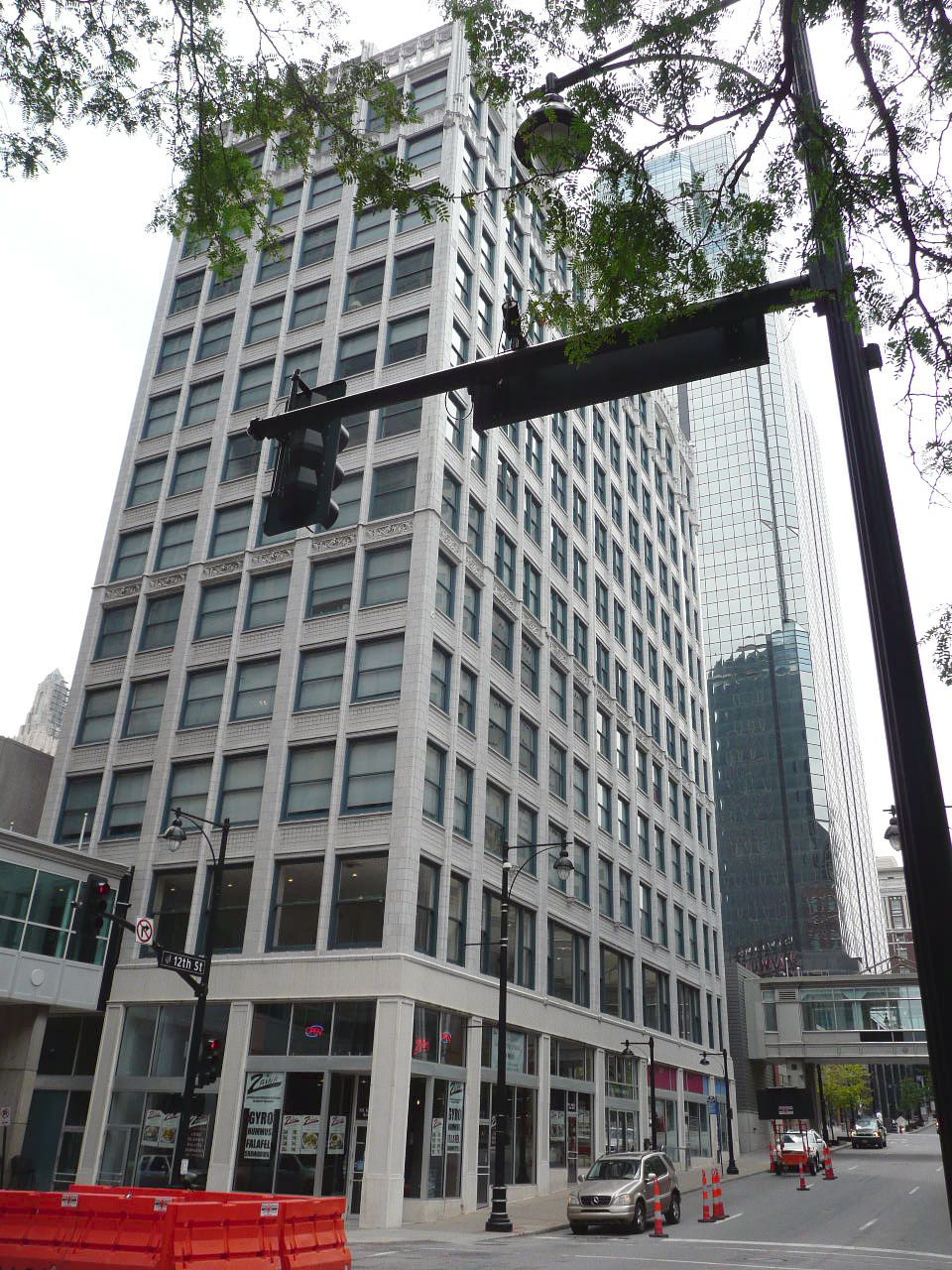
- Chambers Building in 2015

- Location within Missouri Location within the United States
- Location: 25 E. 12th St., Kansas City, Missouri
- Coordinates: 39°6′8″N 94°34′56″W
- Area: less than one acre
- Built: 1915
- Architect: Smith, Rae and Lovitt (1915 original); Charles A. Smith (1923 expansion)
- Architectural style: Early Commercial architecture
- NRHP reference No.: 01001379
- Added to NRHP: December 28, 2001

The Chambers Building in Kansas City, Missouri was built in 1915 and 1923. It was designed in Early Commercial style by architect Charles A. Smith. Smith, Rae and Lovitt is also associated with the building.

It has been marketed as Chambers Lofts. A renovation received low-income housing tax credits.

The building was listed on the U.S. National Register of Historic Places in 2001.

It is a 12-story building built of structural steel with a brick and terra cotta exterior. It was built in two phases: 1915 construction of first five stories, and 1923 addition of top seven stories.
