= Chambers–Robinson House =

Historic house in Alabama, United States

- U.S. National Register of Historic Places
- Alabama Register of Landmarks and Heritage
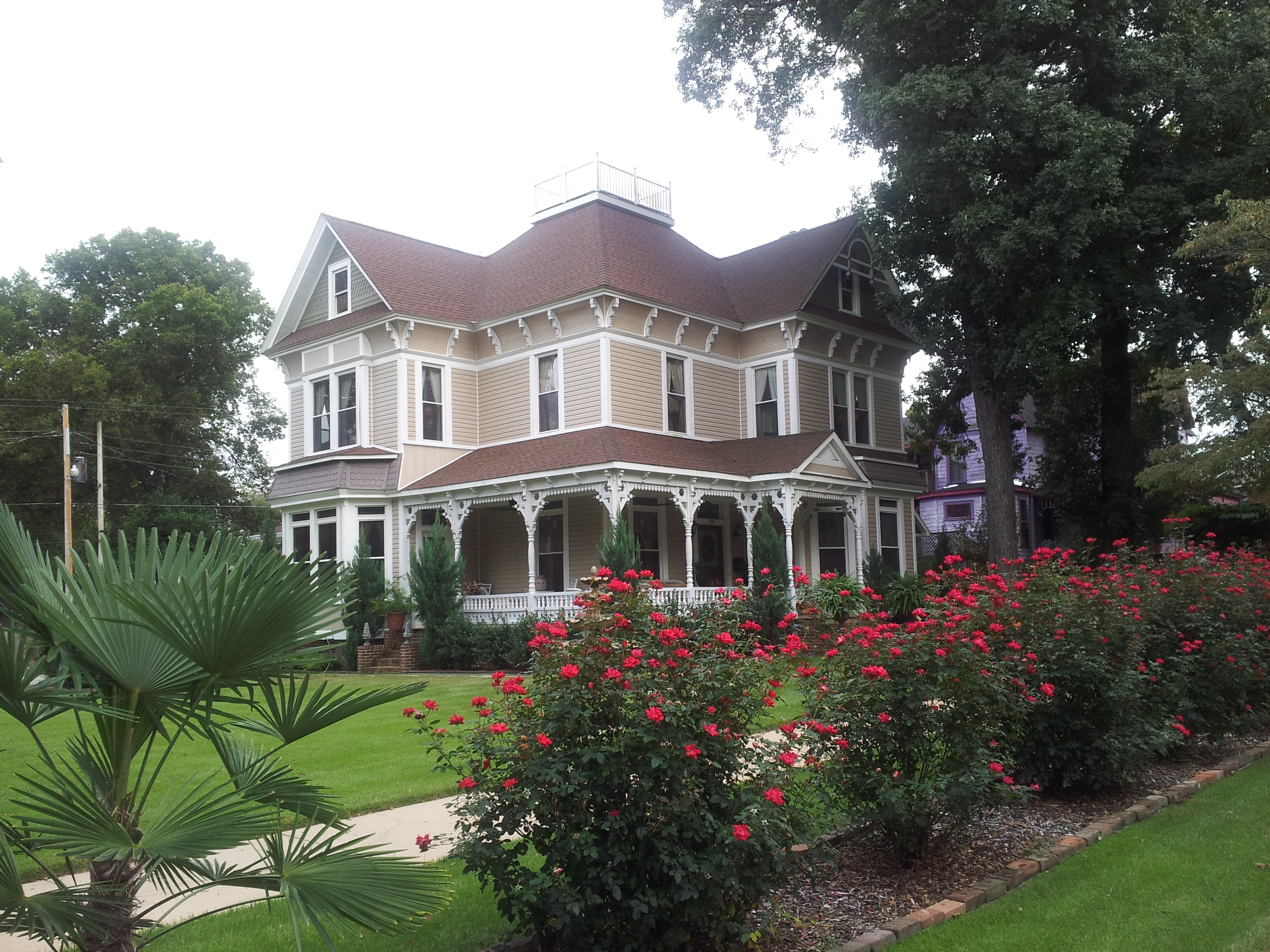
- The house in September 2012

- Location within Alabama Location within the United States
- Location: 910 Montgomery Ave., Sheffield, Alabama
- Coordinates: 34°46′0″N 87°41′50″W
- Area: less than one acre
- Built: 1890
- Architectural style: Queen Anne
- NRHP reference No.: 93000419

Significant dates
- Added to NRHP: May 14, 1993
- Designated ARLH: April 14, 1992

The Chambers–Robinson House (also known as the Samuel Cooke House) is a historic house located at 910 Montgomery Avenue in Sheffield, Alabama, United States.

== Description and history ==
The house was built in 1890 by Judson G. Chambers, and sold to Charles and Dora Robinson in 1898. In 1923, the Robinsons' daughter Caroline and her husband Samuel Cooke built a house one block away, and converted the original house to apartments. They sold the new house in 1940, and lived in the original house until their deaths. The Cookes' daughter sold the house in 1962, and it has remained outside the family since. The house was built in Queen Anne style with some Eastlake details. The two-story frame house has a steeply pitched hipped roof supported by decorative brackets and pierced by several dormers. A porch wraps around the left corner of the house, and features elaborate posts, brackets, and latticework. The entry hall features a grand Eastlake staircase.

The house was listed on the Alabama Register of Landmarks and Heritage in 1992, and on the National Register of Historic Places on May 14, 1993.
