= Pearl and Eva Chambers House =

Historic house in Wisconsin, United States

- U.S. National Register of Historic Places
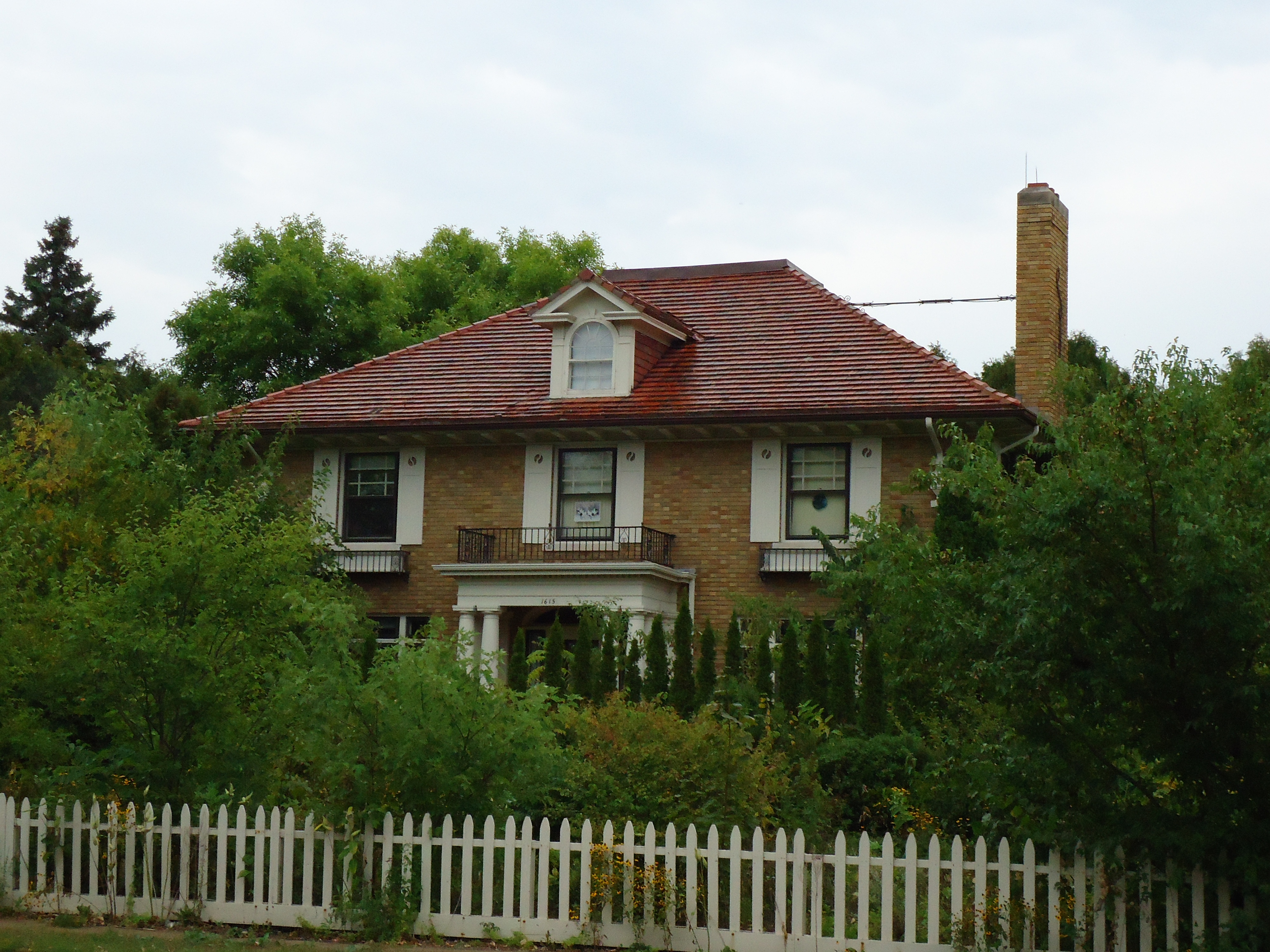

- Location within Wisconsin Location within the United States
- Location: 1615 State St. Eau Claire, Wisconsin
- Coordinates: 44°47′53″N 91°29′40″W
- Built: 1928
- Architect: Edward J. Hancock
- NRHP reference No.: 11001027
- Added to NRHP: January 12, 2012

The Pearl and Eva Chambers House is a historic house located at 1615 State Street in Eau Claire, Wisconsin. It was added to the National Register of Historic Places on January 12, 2012.

== History ==
The house was owned by lumberman Pearl Chambers. After Pearl's death in 1941, his widow, Eva, lived in the house until it was sold in 1953.
