= Central Chambers =

Central Chambers may refer to:

- Central Chambers (Ottawa), a building in Ottawa, Canada
- Central Chambers (Fremantle), a building in Fremantle, Western Australia
- Central Chambers, a listed building on Hope Street in Glasgow, Scotland
- Central Chambers, a 2008 music album by Winterpills
