= Chambers–Morgan Farm =

Historic farm in North Carolina, United States

- U.S. National Register of Historic Places
- U.S. Historic district
- Location within North Carolina Location within the United States
- Location: West side of NC 1228, 0.1 miles (0.16 km) north of NC 1225, near White Store, North Carolina
- Coordinates: 34°52′17″N 80°17′30″W
- Area: 273 acres (110 ha)
- Built: 1829
- Architectural style: Greek Revival, traditional front gable
- NRHP reference No.: 96001526
- Added to NRHP: December 27, 1996

The Chambers–Morgan Farm is a historic farm and national historic district located near White Store, Anson County, North Carolina, United States. It includes four contributing buildings, three contributing sites, and six contributing structures. They include the Greek Revival style Chambers–Morgan House (1829); blacksmith shop, "light house", car shed (1930s), two corn cribs (c. 1910), barn (c. 1910), cemetery (1830–1866), well, pump house (c. 1940), two ponds, and the farm landscape.

It was listed on the National Register of Historic Places in 1996.
