= Chambers Lake =

Chambers Lake may refer to:

- Chambers Lake (Colorado)
- Chambers Lake (New York)
- Chambers Lake (Thurston County, Washington)
