= Chambers Street =

Chambers Street may refer to:

== Streets ==
- Chambers Street, Edinburgh, Scotland
- Chambers Street (Manhattan), New York City, U.S.
- Chamber Street, once known as Chambers Street, London Borough of Tower Hamlets, England

== New York City Subway stations ==
- Chambers Street (BMT Nassau Street Line), serving the J and Z trains
- Chambers Street–World Trade Center (IND Eighth Avenue Line), serving the A, C, and E trains
- Chambers Street station (IRT Broadway–Seventh Avenue Line), serving the 1, 2, and 3 trains
- Chambers Street station (IRT Sixth Avenue Line), on the demolished IRT Sixth Avenue Line

== See also ==
- Chambers Street Ferry Terminal, formerly in Manhattan, New York, U.S.
- Chambers Street Theatre, formerly in Manhattan, New York, U.S.
