= John Chambers House =

Historic house in Michigan, United States

- U.S. National Register of Historic Places
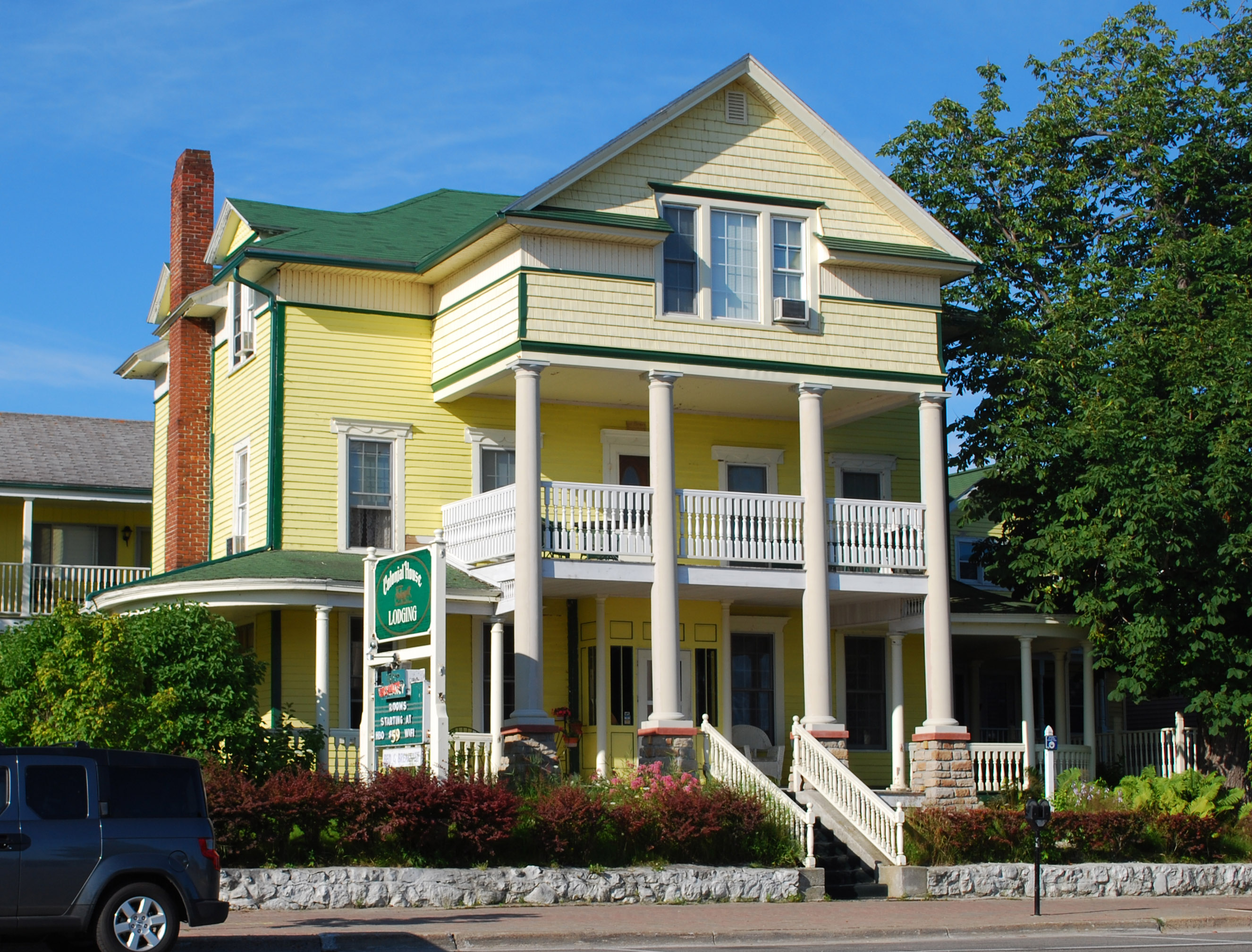
- Interactive map
- Location: 90 North State St., St. Ignace, Michigan
- Coordinates: 45°52′2″N 84°43′24″W
- Built: 1870
- Architectural style: Colonial Revival
- NRHP reference No.: 82002849
- Added to NRHP: April 22, 1982

The John Chambers House is an originally residential building located at 90 North State Street in St. Ignace, Michigan. The house is currently operated as the Colonial House Inn. It was listed on the National Register of Historic Places in 1982.

== History ==
John Chambers Sr. was born in Ireland in 1801, and emigrated from Ireland to Philadelphia in 1846. He moved from Philadelphia to Illinois, and then in 1849 to Mackinac Island where he was joined by his wife and children. Chambers supported himself by fishing and farming, reclaiming a farm near Castle Rock, and eventually increased his wealth to a comfortable level. In 1870 the family moved to St. Ignace, where Chambers built a two-story house on State Street. John Chambers Sr. died in 1890 in St. Ignace.

John Chambers had eight children; three of his sons, John Jr., Michael, and Patrick, opened a prosperous general store in St. Ignace in 1870 under the name "Chambers Brothers." The three pooled their money and invested heavily in local real estate, including the first dock built in the city. John Jr. died in 1891, but the other two Chambers continued a prosperous business, opening branch stores in other towns.

Michael Chambers, born in 1850, was particularly prominent. He served in 1889–90 in the Michigan House of Representatives two terms as mayor of St. Ignace in 1890 and 1891. He also served on the board of Michigan Technological University, then the Michigan School of Mines. Patrick Chambers also entered politics at a local level, serving as Supervisor of Ignace Township and County Treasurer in the 1870s and 80s.

In 1910, Michael and Patrick built a Colonial Revival front section onto their family home. Patrick died in 1916 and Michael in 1918; the house stayed in the family until 1945, when it was sold to a retired ship captain, who used it as an inn from 1947 to 1978. The inn was renovated in 1978–1981, and reopened that year. As of 2010, the house is used as the Colonial House Inn.

== Description ==
The older section of the Chambers House is located in the rear; it is a two-story, hipped-roof structure sitting on a rubble foundation. The front addition is three stories, covered with yellow fish-scale shingles and clapboards. A two-story entrance portico is supported by Doric columns.
