= Washington State Association for Justice =

Legal trade association in the State of Washington

The Washington State Association for Justice is a trade association of over 2,200 plaintiff's attorneys and staff, with offices in Seattle, Olympia and Spokane.

WSAJ provides members with professional networking, online listserves, a data bank of relevant court documents and legal experts, and a member directory. The organization also provides an extensive continuing legal education (CLE) program in locations throughout Washington. Additionally, WSAJ's Olympia-based government affairs staff lobbies legislators and state agencies to advance a pro-civil justice legislative agenda, intended to preserve and enhance the rights of injured people.

== History ==
The Washington State Association for Justice was originally formed in 1953 as the National Association of Claimants Compensation Attorneys - NACCA; it became the Washington State Trial Lawyers Association (WSTLA) in 1967 and the Washington State Association for Justice (WSAJ) in 2008. WSAJ current statewide membership comprises over 2,400 attorneys and staff.

== Membership and governance ==
The 2024-25 WSAJ President is Elizabeth Hanley, and the President-Elect is Hardeep S. Rekhi. Sara Crumb is WSAJ's Executive Director, chief executive of the organization since 2020. Larry Shannon has been the Government Affairs Director since 1994.

The organization is governed by an approximately 35-member Board of Governors, elected by voting members. Voting members must be lawyers who have represented the plaintiff in at least 50 percent of their cases. WSAJ's attorney members practice a broad range of legal practice areas, including personal injury, wrongful death, medical malpractice, worker's compensation, insurance litigation, consumer protection, employment litigation, nursing home abuse, and product liability.
