= List of tallest buildings in Bellevue, Washington =

Skyline of Bellevue
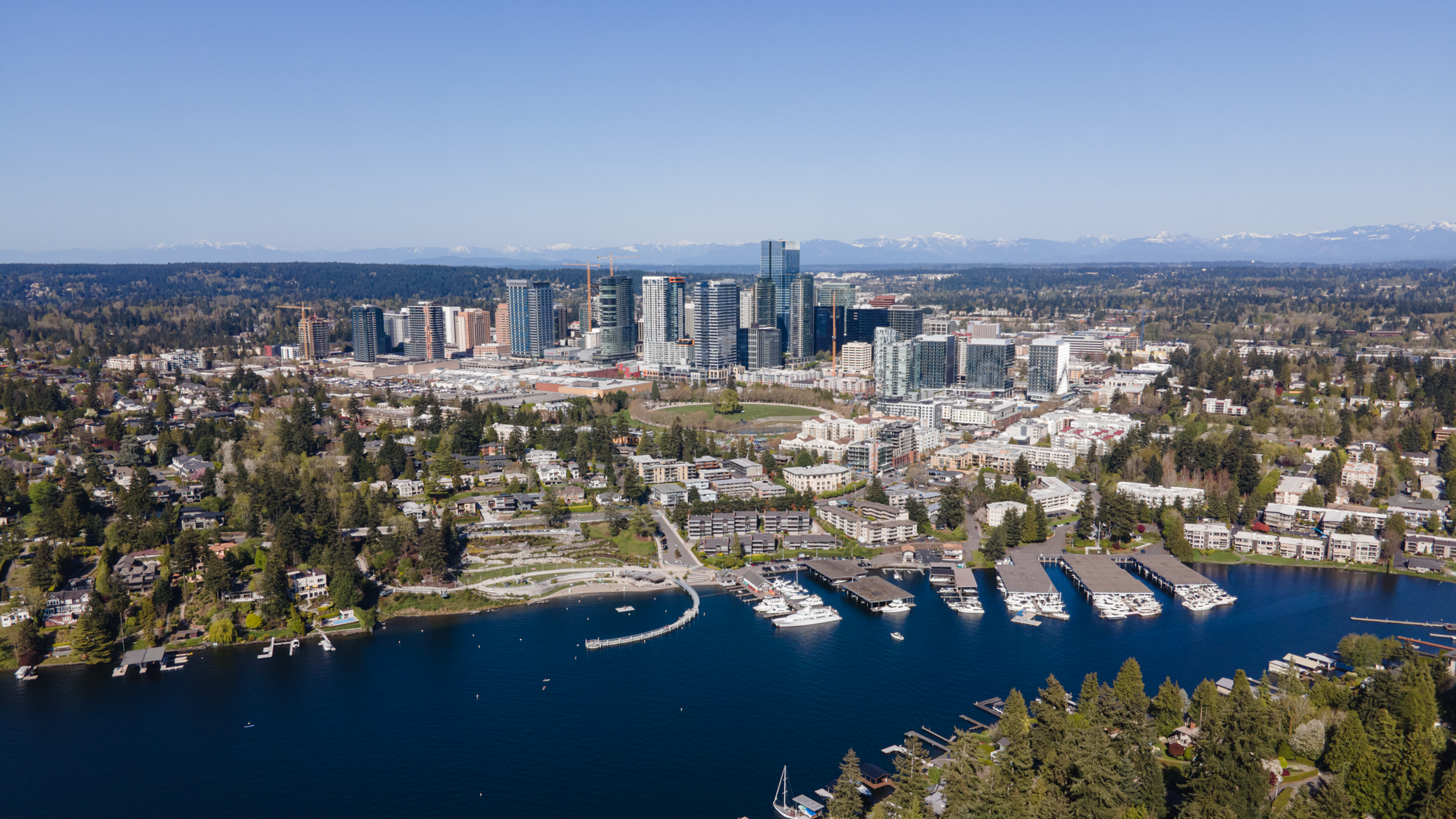
- The Downtown Bellevue skyline seen from the west in 2023
- Tallest building: Sonic (2023)
- Tallest building height: 600 feet (183 m)
- First 150 m+ building: Sonic (2023)

Number of tall buildings (2025)
- Taller than 100 m (328 ft): 10

Number of tall buildings — feet
- Taller than 300 ft (91.4 m): 17

The city of Bellevue, Washington, part of the Seattle metropolitan area, has at least 41 high-rise buildings, 23 of which stand 250 feet (76 m) or taller in height. Downtown Bellevue started to develop into a high-rise office district in the 1970s and continues to grow, with new residential buildings being added in the late 2000s. The tallest building in the city, measuring 600 feet (180 m) in height, is the 42-story Amazon Sonic. Amazon Sonic, formerly known as the 555 Tower during construction, was the first skyscraper to reach the city's 600-foot (180 m) height limit, which was raised in 2017, upon its completion in 2023.

Bellevue's history of high-rise development began with the completion of the Paccar Tower in 1970; this structure is regarded as the city's first high-rise. High-rise building construction remained slow until 1982, when the city's first building boom took place. Eight of the city's 24 tallest buildings were completed over the next seven years, including City Center Bellevue, which was the tallest building in the city for almost two decades. The high-rise construction boom ended in 1989, and only one high-rise which ranked among the city's tallest structures was completed during the 1990s. From 2000, Bellevue entered into a second, much larger building boom that continued for the next decade. More than half of Bellevue's twenty tallest buildings were completed from then on; nine projects were completed in 2008 alone, including Bellevue Towers. With the groundbreaking of the SoMa Towers project in 2012, the city entered another period of heavy building construction. The largest recent developments under construction are the W Bellevue Hotel (500 Lincoln Square) and 400 Lincoln Square; both of these buildings constitute the southward expansion of Lincoln Square and stand approximately 450 feet (140 m) tall. In 2017, the city raised height limits to allow for buildings as tall as 600 feet (180 m) in some areas of the downtown core. The 2 Line of Link light rail opened in 2024 with a station in downtown Bellevue, incentivizing a new round of development along the eastern edge of downtown.

== Cityscape ==
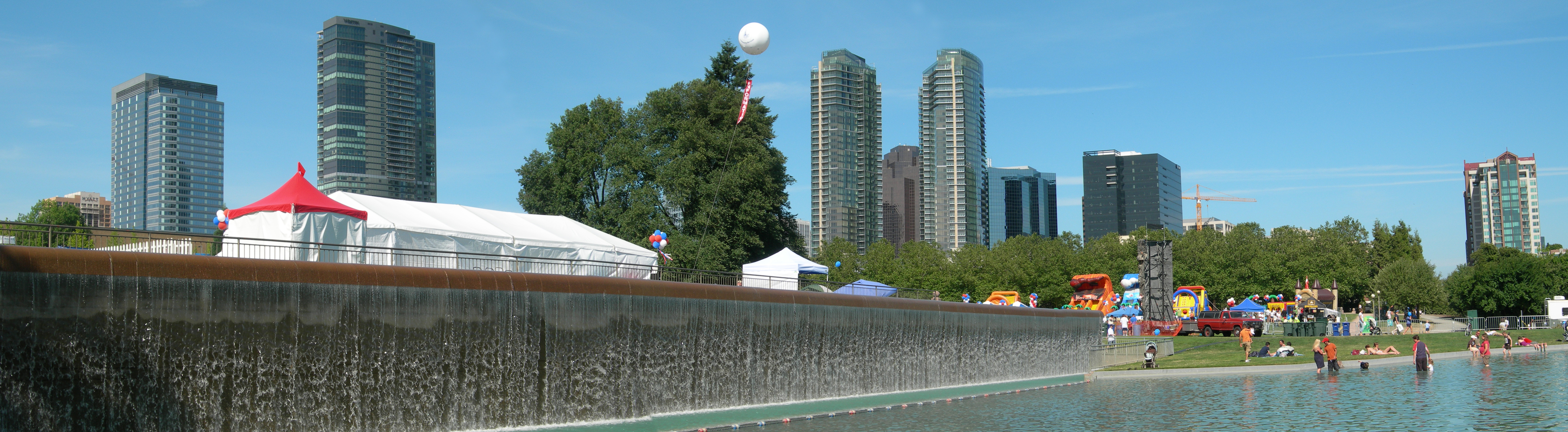
A panoramic of Bellevue's skyline from Downtown Park in 2007.
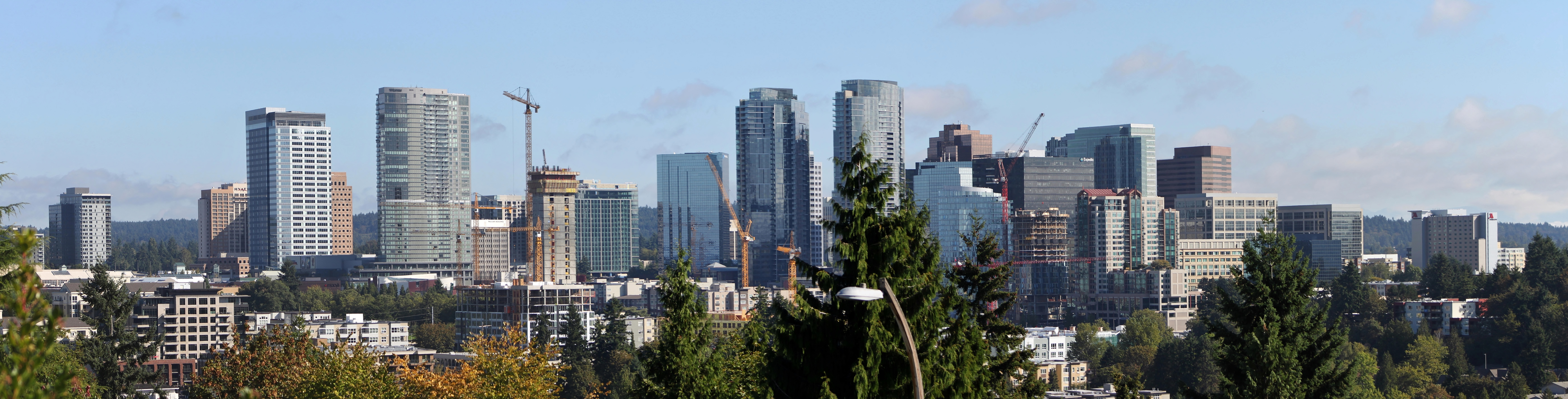
A panoramic of Bellevue's skyline from the southwest in 2015

== Tallest completed buildings ==
This list ranks Bellevue's buildings that stand at least 250 feet (76 m) tall, based on standard height measurement. This includes spires and architectural details but does not include antenna masts. The "Year" column indicates the year in which a building was completed.

Rank	Name	Image	Height ft (m)	Floors	Use	Year	Coordinates	Notes
1	Amazon Sonic		600 (183)	42	Office	2023	47°36′55″N 122°11′48.5″W	This building was formerly known as the 555 Tower.
1	Bellevue 600		600 (183)	43	Office	2025	47°36′57.7″N 122°11′39.6″W	Topped out in September 2024
3	Bellevue Towers - South Tower		450 (140)	43	Residential	2008	47°36′50.94″N 122°11′52.04″W	The tallest all-residential building in the city.
3	One Lincoln Tower		450 (140)	42	Hotel, Residential	2005	47°36′56.95″N 122°12′2.80″W	
3	Two Lincoln Tower		450 (140)	42	Hotel, Residential	2017	47°36′54.58″N 122°12′2.09″W	Houses apartments and the W Bellevue hotel.
5	400 Lincoln Square		449 (137)	31	Office	2017	47°36′51.18″N 122°12′2.84″W	This building has 710,000 square feet of Class A office space.
6	Bellevue Towers - North Tower		430 (130)	42	Residential	2008	47°36′52.28″N 122°11′53.83″W	
8	Lincoln Square North		412 (126)	28	Office	2007	47°37′1.49″N 122°12′3.88″W	This building was formerly known as Eddie Bauer at Lincoln Square.
9	The Eight		396 (121)	25	Office	2024	47°37′04.1″N 122°11′49.1″W	Developed by Skanska
10	City Center East		360 (110)	26	Office	2009	47°36′53.65″N 122°11′37.77″W	The building was originally planned to rise 34 floors and 450 feet but was downsized in December 2005.
11	City Center Bellevue		358 (109)	27	Office	1986	47°36′54.26″N 122°11′44.68″W	Tallest building completed in the 1980s.
12	The Artise		352 (107)	25	Office	2024	47°37′04.4″N 122°11′53.4″W	To be leased by Amazon
13	The Bravern - North Tower		325 (99)	33	Residential	2009	47°36′58.79″N 122°11′33.73″W	This building is also known as The Bravern Residence Tower I.
13	The Bravern - South Tower		325 (99)	33	Residential	2009	47°36′56.86″N 122°11′35.02″W	This building is also known as The Bravern Residence Tower II.
15	Symetra Financial Center		324 (99)	25	Office	1986	47°37′1.21″N 122°11′48.23″W	This building was formerly known as Rainier Plaza.
16	Key Center		322 (98)	22	Office	2000	47°36′57.70″N 122°11′48.23″W	This building is also known as Three Bellevue Center.
17	Skyline Tower		318 (97)	24	Office	1983	47°36′50.59″N 122°11′38.25″W	
18	Avenue Bellevue South Tower	Upload image	308 (94)	26	Hotel/Residential	2024	47°37′04.1″N 122°12′09.9″W	Hotel portion operated by InterContinental
19	Elements Apartments - Building 989		288 (88)	26	Residential	2006	47°37′8.80″N 122°11′29.63″W	This building was the first rental apartment high-rise building in Bellevue.
20	Avenue Bellevue West Tower	Upload image	284 (87)	25	Hotel/Residential	2024	47°37′05.2″N 122°12′11.7″W	
21	The Bravern Building 2		280 (85)	23	Office	2009	47°37′1.25″N 122°11′34.71″W	It is also known as The Bravern Office Commons–Tower II.
22	Tower 333		272 (83)	20	Office	2008	47°36′48.54″N 122°11′48.47″W	This building is also known as Tower 333.
23	Bank of America Tower		270 (82)	21	Office	1988	47°37′4.29″N 122°12′0.94″W	
24	Hyatt Regency Bellevue		265 (81)	25	Hotel	1989	47°37′5.70″N 122°12′3.24″W	This structure is the tallest all-hotel building in the city.
25	One Bellevue Center	Upload image	260 (79)	22	Office	1983	47°36′51.01″N 122°11′48.16″W	
25	Two Washington Square		260 (79)	25	Residential	2008	47°37′7.47″N 122°11′51.20″W	
27	Bellevue Pacific Tower		259 (79)	23	Office, Residential	1995	47°36′42.44″N 122°11′53.46″W	This structure was the tallest building completed in the 1990s.
28	One Washington Square		250 (76)	24	Residential	2008	47°37′7.52″N 122°11′54.84″W	
28	929 Tower	Upload image	250 (76)	19	Office	2015	47°37′5.72″N 122°11′48.43″W	
28	West Main Tower I		250 (76)	19	Office	2024	47°36′37.9″N 122°11′58″W	Leased by Amazon
28	West Main Tower II		250 (76)	16	Office	2026	47°36′42.2″N 122°11′58.8″W	Planned by Vulcan Real Estate; development paused in 2022 and resumed in 2026.
28	West Main Tower III		250 (76)	17	Office	2026	47°36′39.9″N 122°11′58″W	Planned by Vulcan Real Estate; development paused in 2022 and resumed in 2026.

== Timeline of tallest buildings ==
Name	Image	Years as tallest	Height ft (m)	Floors	Location	Notes
Puget Power Building	—	1956–1967 (11 years)	52 (16)	4	10607 NE 4th Street; 47°36′49.30″N 122°11′55.10″W	
400 Building		1967–1970 (3 years)	92 (28)	7	400 108th Avenue NE; 47°36′50.40″N 122°11′45.60″W	
Paccar Tower		1970–1982 (12 years)	170 (52)	13	777 106th Ave NE; 47°37′0.01″N 122°11′58.64″W	
Plaza Center		1982–1983 (2 years)	223 (68)	16	10900 NE 8th Street; 47°37′4.36″N 122°11′38.28″W	
Skyline Tower		1983–1986 (3 years)	318 (97)	24	10900 NE 4th Street; 47°36′50.59″N 122°11′38.25″W	
City Center Bellevue		1986–2005 (19 years)	358 (109)	27	500 108th Avenue NE; 47°36′54.26″N 122°11′44.68″W	
One Lincoln Tower		2005–2023 (18 years)	450 (137)	42	604 Bellevue Way; 47°36′56.95″N 122°12′2.80″W	
Bellevue Towers - South Tower		2008–2023 (15 years)	450 (137)	43	10655 4th Street; 47°36′50.94″N 122°11′52.04″W	
Two Lincoln Tower		2017–2023 (6 years)	450 (137)	42	10485 NE 6th St 47°36′54.58″N 122°12′2.09″W	
Amazon Sonic		2023–present	600 (183)	42	555 108th Ave NE 47°36′55″N 122°11′48.5″W	

== See also ==
- List of tallest buildings in Seattle
- List of tallest buildings in Tacoma, Washington

== Notes ==
A. Based on SkyscraperPage diagrams of Seattle, Portland, and Bellevue.
