= 2024 Washington Supreme Court election =

The 2024 Washington Supreme Court election was held on November 5, 2024, to elect three members of the Washington Supreme Court, concurrently with the 2024 U.S. presidential election, as well as elections to the U.S. Senate and various state and local elections, including for U.S. House and governor of Washington. Incumbent Supreme Court justices Steven González and Sheryl Gordon McCloud were each re-elected unopposed. Justice Susan Owens reached mandatory retirement and was succeeded by Sal Mungia.

== Position 2 ==
2024 Washington Supreme Court Position 2 election

Candidate	Sal Mungia	Dave Larson
Party	Nonpartisan	Nonpartisan
Popular vote	1,644,253	1,624,309
Percentage	50.05%	49.44%
- Mungia: 40–50% 50–60% 60–70% 70–80% 80–90% 90–100% Larson: 40–50% 50–60% 60–70% 70–80% 80–90% 90–100% Tie: 40–50% 50% No votes
Washington Supreme Court Justice before election
Susan Owens
Nonpartisan
Elected Washington Supreme Court Justice
Sal Mungia
Nonpartisan

Associate Justice Susan Owens reached the mandatory retirement age of 75 in 2024 and was therefore ineligible to seek re-election. Attorney Sal Mungia received the endorsements of many elected Democrats as well as the state Democratic Party while Federal Way Municipal Court Judge Dave Larson was endorsed by the state Republican Party and spoke at Republican events.

=== Primary election ===
Washington is one of two states that holds a top-two primary, meaning all candidates are listed on the same ballot regardless of party affiliation, and the top two advance to the general election.

==== Advanced to general ====
- Dave Larson, Judge of the Federal Way Municipal Court
- Salvador Mungia, appellate lawyer, ACLU cooperating lawyer

==== Eliminated in primary ====
- Todd Bloom, tax attorney, Republican candidate for Washington's 6th congressional district in 2016 and 2022
- David Shelvey, family law attorney

==== Endorsements ====
Dave Larson

Political parties

- Washington State Republican Party

Newspapers and other media

- The Columbian
Sal Mungia

State officials

- Bob Ferguson, incumbent attorney general
- Jay Inslee, incumbent governor

Political parties

- Washington State Democratic Party

Newspapers and other media

- The Everett Herald
- The Seattle Times
- The Stranger

==== Polling ====
Poll source	Date(s) administered	Sample size (Note: Key: A – all adults RV – registered voters LV – likely voters V – unclear)	Margin of error	Todd Bloom	David Larson	Sal Mungia	David Shelvey	Undecided
Public Policy Polling (D) (Note: Poll sponsored by the Northwest Progressive Institute)	July 24–25, 2024	581 (LV)	± 4.0%	3%	8%	8%	3%	78%

==== Results ====
County results Mungia: 30–40%; 40–50%; 50–60%; Larson: 30–40%; 40–50%; 50–60%

County results Mungia: 40–50%; 50–60%; 70–80%; Larson: 40–50%

Blanket primary election results
Party	Candidate	Votes	%
Nonpartisan	Sal Mungia	762,797	43.43%
Nonpartisan	Dave Larson	640,116	36.45%
Nonpartisan	Todd Bloom	286,298	16.30%
Nonpartisan	David Shelvey	59,676	3.40%
Write-in		7,347	0.42%
Total votes		1,756,234	100.00%

=== General election ===
==== Polling ====
Poll source	Date(s) administered	Sample size	Margin of error	Sal Mungia	David Larson	Undecided
Public Policy Polling (D)	October 16–17, 2024	571 (LV)	± 4.1%	10%	14%	76%

==== Results ====
2024 Washington Supreme Court Position 2 election
Party	Candidate	Votes	%
Nonpartisan	Sal Mungia	1,644,253	50.05%
Nonpartisan	Dave Larson	1,624,309	49.44%
Write-in		16,654	0.51%
Total votes		3,285,216	100.00%
Democratic hold			

==== By county ====
County results
County	Sal Mungia Democratic		Dave Larson Republican		Write-in Various		Margin		Total votes
County	#	%	#	%	#	%	#	%	Total votes
Adams	1,588	35.41%	2,833	63.18%	63	1.40%	-1,245	-27.77%	4,484
Asotin	2,954	31.50%	6,362	67.85%	61	0.65%	-3,408	-36.34%	9,377
Benton	32,608	37.45%	54,089	62.13%	364	0.42%	-21,481	-24.67%	87,061
Chelan	13,814	40.55%	20,145	59.13%	109	0.32%	-6,331	-18.58%	34,068
Clallam	17,737	44.95%	21,594	54.73%	126	0.32%	-3,857	-9.78%	39,457
Clark	103,335	45.71%	121,088	53.56%	1,652	0.73%	-17,753	-7.85%	226,075
Columbia	532	26.56%	1,454	72.59%	17	0.85%	-922	-46.03%	2,003
Cowlitz	15,290	30.81%	34,033	68.59%	296	0.60%	-18,743	-37.77%	49,619
Douglas	5,799	33.19%	11,587	66.31%	88	0.50%	-5,788	-33.12%	17,474
Ferry	893	26.83%	2,419	72.69%	16	0.48%	-1,526	-45.85%	3,328
Franklin	11,297	40.70%	16,390	59.04%	72	0.26%	-5,093	-18.35%	27,759
Garfield	221	20.07%	873	79.29%	7	0.64%	-652	-59.22%	1,101
Grant	9,301	30.27%	21,299	69.33%	122	0.40%	-11,998	-39.05%	30,722
Grays Harbor	10,693	34.74%	19,886	64.60%	203	0.66%	-9,193	-29.86%	30,782
Island	20,159	47.24%	22,193	52.00%	325	0.76%	-2,034	-4.77%	42,677
Jefferson	12,166	59.39%	8,235	40.20%	83	0.41%	3,931	19.19%	20,484
King	617,164	64.96%	329,084	34.64%	3,775	0.40%	288,080	30.32%	950,023
Kitsap	64,235	48.98%	66,188	50.47%	719	0.55%	-1,953	-1.49%	131,142
Kittitas	7,585	36.08%	13,307	63.29%	132	0.63%	-5,722	-27.22%	21,024
Klickitat	4,488	41.30%	6,327	58.22%	53	0.49%	-1,839	-16.92%	10,868
Lewis	9,905	27.40%	26,057	72.07%	192	0.53%	-16,152	-44.68%	36,154
Lincoln	1,403	23.76%	4,466	75.62%	37	0.63%	-3,063	-51.86%	5,906
Mason	11,125	37.32%	18,419	61.80%	262	0.88%	-7,294	-24.47%	29,806
Okanogan	7,000	40.04%	10,408	59.53%	76	0.43%	-3,408	-19.49%	17,484
Pacific	4,341	38.45%	6,889	61.02%	60	0.53%	-2,548	-22.57%	11,290
Pend Oreille	2,084	29.26%	4,970	69.78%	68	0.95%	-2,886	-40.52%	7,122
Pierce	170,508	46.04%	198,369	53.56%	1,507	0.41%	-27,861	-7.52%	370,384
San Juan	6,608	64.23%	3,647	35.45%	33	0.32%	2,961	28.78%	10,288
Skagit	24,421	42.64%	32,591	56.91%	255	0.45%	-8,170	-14.27%	57,267
Skamania	2,224	37.78%	3,628	61.64%	34	0.58%	-1,404	-23.85%	5,886
Snohomish	163,814	46.73%	185,176	52.82%	1,585	0.45%	-21,362	-6.09%	350,575
Spokane	98,174	40.90%	140,225	58.41%	1,655	0.69%	-42,051	-17.52%	240,054
Stevens	5,923	24.71%	17,913	74.74%	131	0.55%	-11,990	-50.03%	23,967
Thurston	72,935	52.13%	65,865	47.08%	1,099	0.79%	7,070	5.05%	139,899
Wahkiakum	792	33.21%	1,576	66.08%	17	0.71%	-784	-32.87%	2,385
Walla Walla	10,305	41.10%	14,683	58.55%	88	0.35%	-4,378	-17.46%	25,076
Whatcom	62,239	53.26%	54,234	46.41%	385	0.33%	8,005	6.85%	116,858
Whitman	7,405	44.38%	9,192	55.09%	89	0.53%	-1,787	-10.71%	16,686
Yakima	31,188	39.68%	46,615	59.31%	798	1.02%	-15,427	-19.63%	78,601
Totals	1,644,253	50.05%	1,624,309	49.44%	16,654	0.51%	19,944	0.61%	3,285,216

==== By congressional district ====
Despite losing the state, Larson won six of ten congressional districts, including four that elected Democrats.

District	Mungia	Larson	Representative
1st	52%	48%	Suzan DelBene
2nd	50%	49%	Rick Larsen
3rd	41%	59%	Marie Gluesenkamp Perez
4th	38%	62%	Dan Newhouse
5th	39%	61%	Cathy McMorris Rodgers (118th Congress)
5th	39%	61%	Michael Baumgartner (119th Congress)
6th	49%	51%	Derek Kilmer (118th Congress)
6th	49%	51%	Emily Randall (119th Congress)
7th	78%	22%	Pramila Jayapal
8th	44%	56%	Kim Schrier
9th	59%	41%	Adam Smith
10th	49%	50%	Marilyn Strickland

== Position 8 ==
2024 Washington Supreme Court Position 8 election
Candidate	Steven González
Party	Nonpartisan
Popular vote	2,564,372
Percentage	97.64%
- González: 60–70% 70–80% 80–90% 90–100% Write-in: 90–100% No Votes
Washington Supreme Court Justice before election
Steven González
Nonpartisan
Elected Washington Supreme Court Justice
Steven González
Nonpartisan

=== Candidates ===
==== Advanced to general ====
- Steven González, incumbent justice

=== Results ===
2024 Washington Supreme Court Position 8 election
Party	Candidate	Votes	%
Nonpartisan	Steven González (incumbent)	2,564,372	97.64%
Write-in		61,866	2.36%
Total votes		2,626,238	100.00%
Democratic hold			

== Position 9 ==
2024 Washington Supreme Court Position 9 election
Candidate	Sheryl Gordon McCloud
Party	Nonpartisan
Popular vote	2,534,783
Percentage	97.48%
- Gordon McCloud: 70–80% 80–90% 90–100% Write-in: 90–100% No Votes
Washington Supreme Court Justice before election
Sheryl Gordon McCloud
Nonpartisan
Elected Washington Supreme Court Justice
Sheryl Gordon McCloud
Nonpartisan

=== Candidates ===
==== Advanced to general ====
- Sheryl Gordon McCloud, incumbent justice

=== Results ===
2024 Washington Supreme Court Position 9 election
Party	Candidate	Votes	%
Nonpartisan	Sheryl Gordon McCloud (incumbent)	2,534,783	97.48%
Write-in		65,479	2.52%
Total votes		2,600,262	100.00%
Democratic hold			

== Notes ==
Partisan clients
