= Blue C Sushi =

American sushi restaurant chain

- Type: Private
- Founded: 2003
- Area served: Seattle, San Francisco, Los Angeles

Blue C Sushi was a Seattle-based sushi restaurant chain that operated between 2003 and 2018. Focused around conveyor belt sushi, it expanded rapidly in the early 2010s. Due to mismanagement, all locations abruptly shuttered in October 2018.

== History ==
=== Early years ===
Blue C Sushi was founded by Steve Rosen, James Allard, Rusell Horowitz, and along with chef Shinichi Miura. The company's original Fremont location opened in 2003, followed by University Village in 2005. The founders created a parent company, Madison Holdings Inc. to oversee both Blue C Sushi, Kaisho and their ramen business, Boom Noodle. Allard and Rosen departed from the company in 2012. After an executive reshuffle, the new leadership were tasked with expanding into California. In 2016, Madison closed the last Boom Noodle shop.

=== Bankruptcy ===
On January 6, 2018, Madison Holdings Inc. sent out an email to all staff announcing the closure of all of the company's restaurants, and the termination of over a hundred staff. A representative of the company cited "unexpected financial and other circumstances" as the reasons behind the closure. A report from Eater Seattle found that Blue C Sushi was more than $34 million in debt due to rapid expansion and poor management by the remaining co-founder Rusell Horowitz. Soon after the parent company went bankrupt.

== Operation ==
Each location had a conveyor belt, surrounded by booths where customers could sit and grab food. The conveyor belt used RFID technology to provide information about how long the plate had been on the belt, the chef that made it, and when it was taken off.

Themed around the Tokyo Metro, each tier of dish was named after a line, with the cheapest being the Shinjuku Line, ($1.50) going up to the Mita Line ($4).

== Restaurants ==
At the time of bankruptcy, Blue C Sushi operated nine restaurants throughout the United States, six in Washington State, and another three in California.

Washington:

- Alderwood Mall
- Bellevue Square
- Downtown Seattle
- Fremont
- Southcenter
- University Village

California:

- Hollywood (Sunset and Vine)
- Newport Beach (Fashion Island)
- San Francisco (Stonestown Galleria)
