= James A. Andersen =

American judge (1924–2022)

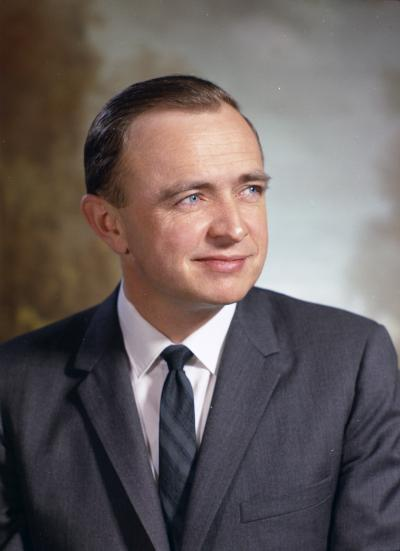
- Andersen in 1969

Justice of the Washington State Supreme Court
- In office July 3, 1984 – 1995
- Preceded by: Charles F. Stafford Jr.
- Succeeded by: Phil Talmadge

Minority Leader of the Washington Senate
- In office January 11, 1971 – January 8, 1973
- Preceded by: R. Frank Atwood
- Succeeded by: Harry B. Lewis

Member of the Washington Senate from the 48th district
- In office January 9, 1967 – January 8, 1973
- Preceded by: Albert C. Thompson Jr.
- Succeeded by: John D. Jones

Member of the Washington House of Representatives from the 48th district
- In office January 12, 1959 – January 9, 1967
- Preceded by: Vacant
- Succeeded by: Richard U. Chapin

Personal details
- Born: September 21, 1924 Auburn, Washington, U.S.
- Died: May 1, 2022 (aged 97) Seattle, Washington, U.S.
- Party: Republican
- Education: University of Washington (BA, LLB)
- Occupation: Attorney, politician, judge

James A. Andersen (September 21, 1924 – May 1, 2022) was an American politician and judge in the state of Washington, serving as a justice of the Washington Supreme Court from 1984 to 1995.

The son of a coal miner, and one himself for a time, Anderson had served in the United States Army as a combat infantryman in World War II, where he was wounded in the Battle of the Bulge near Bastogne. He then attended the University of Washington, receiving his Arts degree in 1949, and law degree from the University of Washington School of Law in 1951.

Anderson served in the Washington House of Representatives from District 48 from 1959 to 1967. In 1968, Anderson was elected as a Republican to the Washington State Senate from the same district, running unopposed. Andersen served in the state senate until 1972. He served in the state legislature for a total of 13 years.

From 1975 to 1984, he was a judge on the Court of Appeals, Division One. In 1981, Anderson was named by the Washington State Bar Association as one of three choices for a seat on the state supreme court. Following the death of Justice Charles F. Stafford in 1984, Andersen again was named for consideration, and was chosen by Governor John Spellman for appointment to the seat. He then ran unopposed in the 1984 election to retain office. From July 9, 1984 to January 9, 1995, he was a justice of the Washington Supreme Court, including a stint as chief justice in 1993. Anderson announced his resignation from the court in 1994, taking effect in 1995.

Andersen married Billiette, with whom he had two children. He died on May 1, 2022, at the age of 97.
