= Senator Buffington =

Senator Buffington may refer to:

- Nancy Buffington (1939–2021), Washington State Senate
- Sherri Smith Buffington (fl. 2000s–2010s), Louisiana State Senate
