= Richard U. Chapin =

American politician

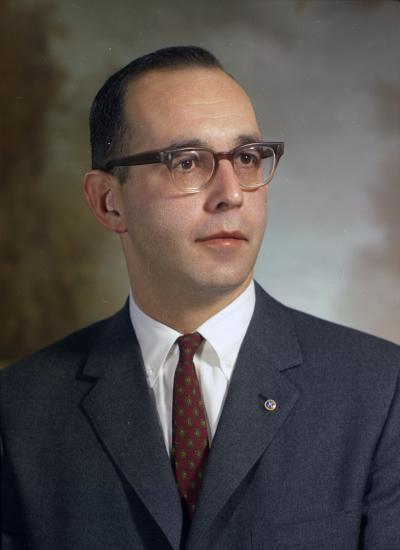
- Chapin in 1967

Member of the Washington House of Representatives from the 48th district
- In office January 9, 1967 – December 29, 1970
- Preceded by: James A. Andersen
- Succeeded by: John D. Jones

Personal details
- Born: Richard Udell Chapin; July 3, 1929 New York City, New York, U.S.
- Died: February 5, 2015 (aged 85)
- Party: Republican
- Occupation: Lawyer

Richard Udell Chapin (July 3, 1929 – February 5, 2015) was an American lawyer and politician in the state of Washington. He served the 34th district from 1967 to 1970. An attorney, he was an alumnus of Columbia University and the University of Michigan College of Literature, Science, and the Arts.
