= Senator Tallmadge =

Senator Tallmadge or Talmadge may refer to:

- Frederick A. Tallmadge (1792–1869), New York State Senate
- Herman Talmadge (1913–2002), U.S. Senator from Georgia from 1957 to 1981
- Matthias B. Tallmadge (1774–1819), New York State Senate
- Nathaniel P. Tallmadge (1795–1864), U.S. Senator from New York from 1833 to 1844
- Phil Talmadge (born 1952), Washington State Senate
