= Puget Power Building =

Building in Bellevue, Washington State (1956–2006)

Coordinates: 47°36′49.3″N 122°11′55.1″W

Record height
- Tallest in Bellevue from 1956 to 1967^{[I]}
- Surpassed by: 400 Building

General information
- Status: Demolished
- Architectural style: Modernist
- Location: 10607 NE 4th, Bellevue, Washington, United States
- Construction started: 1955
- Completed: 1956
- Demolished: February–March 2006
- Owner: Puget Sound Power and Light (Puget Power)

Height
- Height: 52 feet (16 m)

Technical details
- Floor count: 4

Design and construction
- Architecture firm: Harmon, Pray and Detrich
- Designations: Most Endangered Historic Properties (Wash. Trust for Historic Pres.)

The Puget Power Building was a four story tall building in Bellevue, Washington. When it was built in 1956 as the corporate headquarters for Puget Sound Power and Light (popularly known as Puget Power), it was the tallest building in Bellevue and on the Eastside. It was described by conservationists as "the best example of the International Style on the Eastside".

The property was sold to a developer by Puget Sound Energy, the successor to Puget Power. The same day the sale was recorded, the building appeared on the annual list of most endangered historic properties compiled by Washington Trust for Historic Preservation.

The building was demolished in 2006 to make way for a new high-rise development that was to become Bellevue Towers, one of which shared the title of highest building in Bellevue.

Records
Preceded by	Tallest building in Bellevue, Washington; 1956–1967	Succeeded by 400 Building
