= Bellevue Towers =

High rise condominium complex in downtown Bellevue, Washington

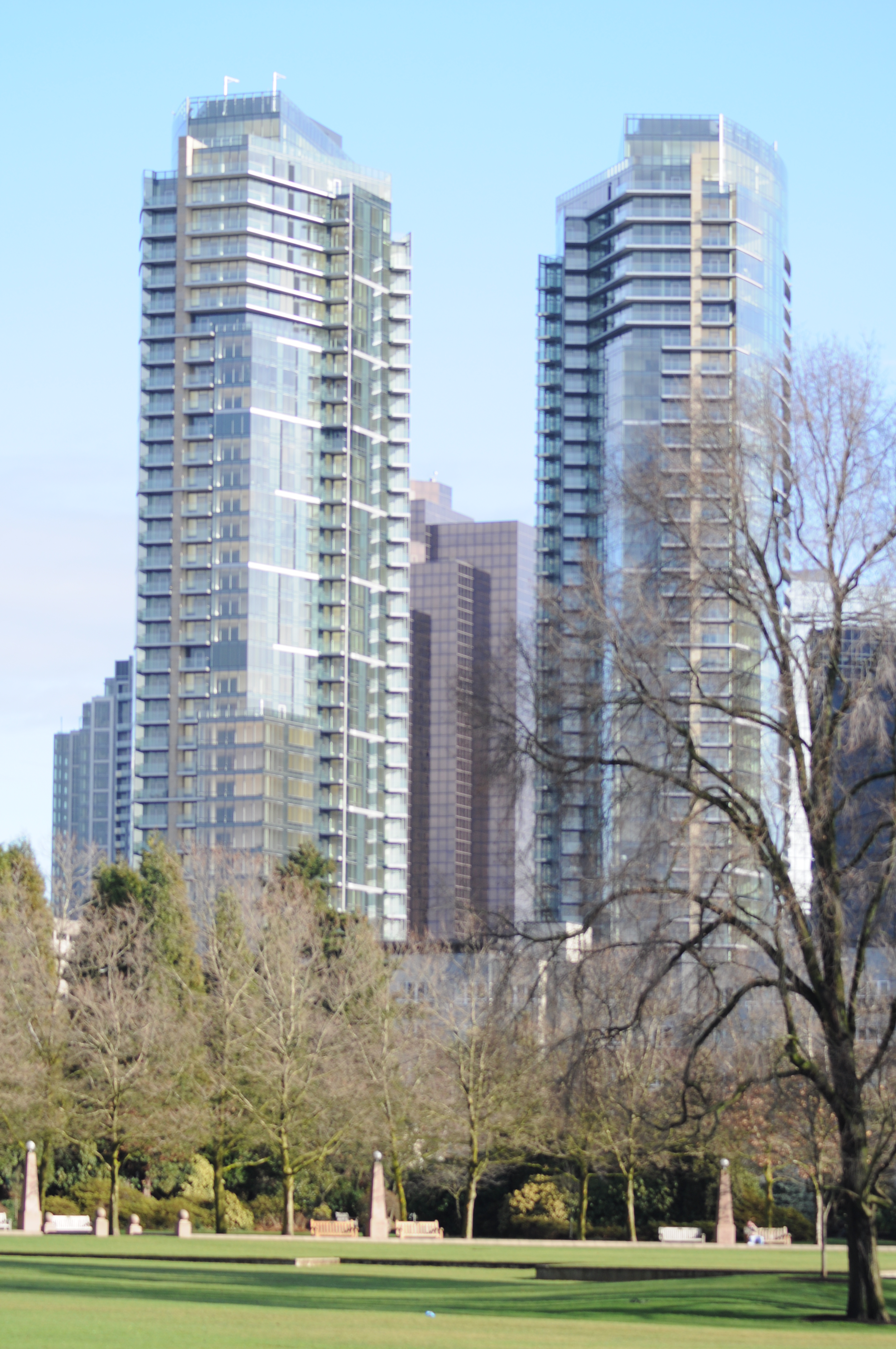
- Bellevue Towers as seen from Bellevue Downtown Park in 2010
- Interactive map of the Bellevue Towers area

General information
- Status: Completed
- Location: 500 106th Ave. NE, Bellevue, Washington, United States
- Coordinates: 47.614°N 122.198°W
- Construction started: 2006
- Completed: 2009

Height
- Height: 450 ft (140 m)

Technical details
- Floor count: 42 and 43

Design and construction
- Architecture firm: MulvannyG2, GBD Architects
- Main contractor: Hoffman Construction
- Designations: LEED Gold

Other information
- Parking: 8 floors, underground

References
- "Bellevue Towers One". Emporis.com. Archived from the original on January 1, 2007. "Projects: Bellevue Towers". McKinstry.

Bellevue Towers is a high rise condominium complex in downtown Bellevue, Washington. Construction began in 2006 and was completed in 2009. The 42 and 43 story towers have 539 condo units, 17,000 square feet (1,580 m^{2}) of retail space, and eight levels of underground parking. The project is 85% sold as of January 2013. Bellevue Towers stands on a 2.43-acre (9,800 m^{2}) site.

Bellevue Towers is the largest Leadership in Energy and Environmental Design (LEED) Gold certified residential development in the Pacific Northwest with its energy-efficient glass facade, low-flow plumbing fixtures, dual-flush toilets, rooftop garden between the towers, and efficient condensing boiler. The $436 million project was developed by Gerding Edlen and built by Hoffman Construction Company. The project was not a financial success: Gerding Edlen could not pay off its loans, and had to turn the project over to their lender in 2011.

== See also ==
- List of tallest buildings in Bellevue, Washington

== Notes and references ==
Records
| Preceded by City Center Bellevue | Tallest building in Bellevue, Washington; 2005–present^{1} | Succeeded by Current record |
Notes and references
1. Tied with One Lincoln Tower
