= Washington Square (Bellevue, Washington) =

Mixed-use neighborhood in downtown Bellevue, Washington

Coordinates: 47°37′08″N 122°11′53″W

Washington Square is a mixed-use neighborhood currently under construction in downtown Bellevue, Washington, United States. The project encompasses a 10.5-acre (42,000 m^{2}) area. It consists of four or five high-rise towers with residential, office, and hotels, as well as 160,000 square feet (15,000 m^{2}) of ground-level retail space.

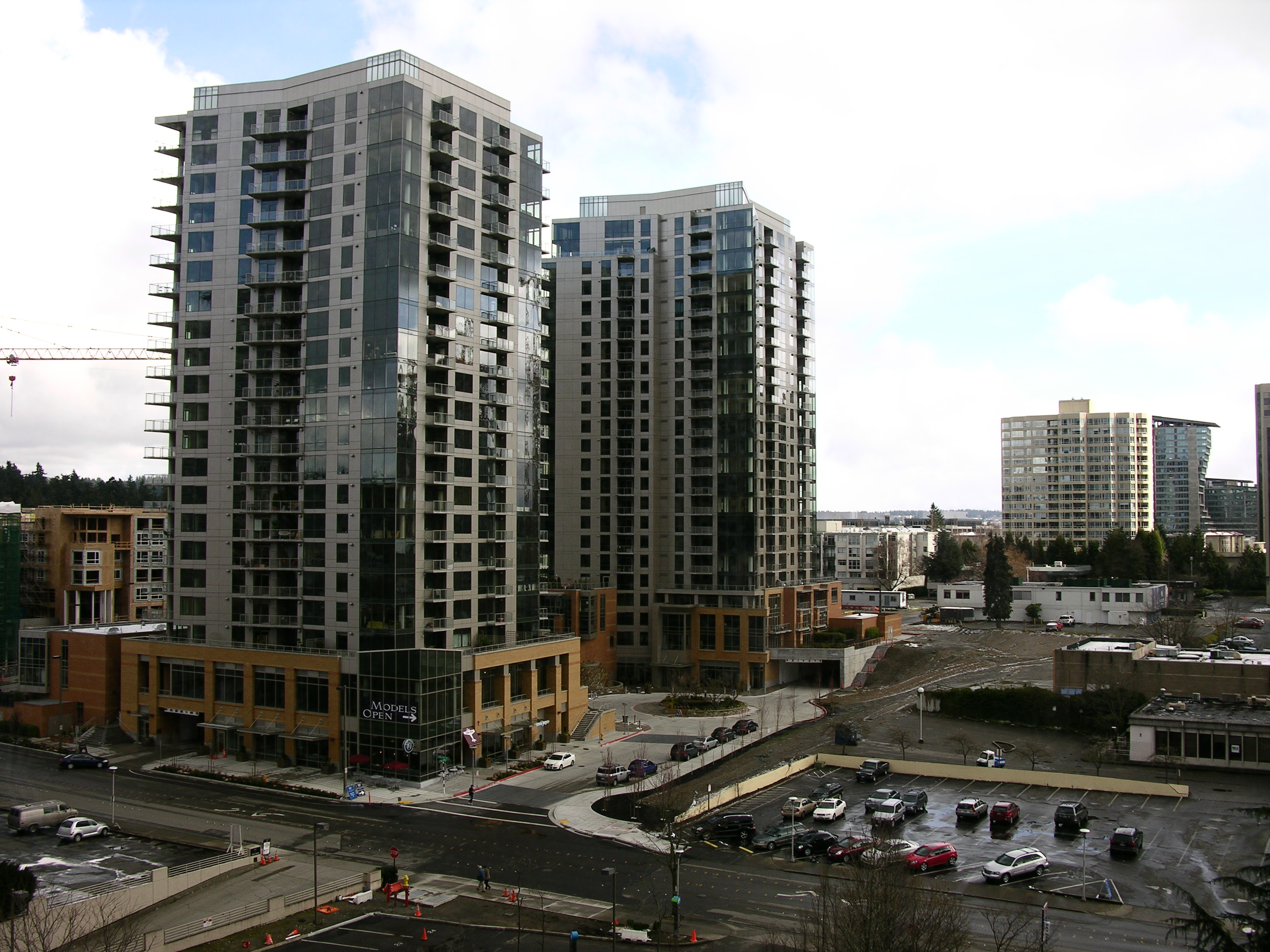
Washington Square as seen from The Bank of America Building across the street

== Location and history ==
The development aims to create a "pedestrian-friendly" community with amenities such as a dog park, fountain, landscaping, and walkways. The first phase, which involved the construction of two residential towers standing at 24 and 26 stories, was completed in the fall of 2008. These towers, reaching a height of 260 feet (79 m), contain a total of 353 condominium units and 26 townhomes. Washington Square represents the third phase of the Bellevue redesign, following the Bellevue Square and Lincoln Square projects. Further construction phases for the superblock have yet to be scheduled.

The site, measuring 10.5 acres (42,000 m^{2}), is bounded by NE 8th and NE 10th Streets to the north and south, and 108th Avenue NE and 106th Avenue NE to the east and west. Over a period of 17 years spanning the 1980s, 1990s, and 2000s, developer Eugene Horback acquired the properties that make up the block. However, following the technology recession in the late 1990s, the project encountered financial difficulties and faced the risk of bankruptcy. To prevent foreclosure, Horback enlisted the assistance of Dell Loy Hansen and his company, Wasatch Development Associates, based in Utah. In September 2002, BV Holdings acquired the superblock from E&H Properties Inc., the company owned by Eugene Horbach, for a total of $30 million. Horback died in 2004, shortly after development activities had commenced.

== Retail space ==
Washington Square is planned to include approximately 180,000 square feet (17,000 m2) of retail space.

== Column spacing ==
Washington Square comprises two towers constructed using steel-reinforced concrete, classified as "Type I Construction". Each tower encompasses 24 stories and is designed with slab thicknesses and column spacing capable of withstanding the seismic and wind loading common in the Northwest region. By implementing post-tensioning techniques for the tower floor slabs, the weight has been minimized, allowing for increased column spacing and improved unit layouts that offer enhanced circulation and exterior views compared to configurations with closer columns.

== Seismic structure ==
DCI, the structural engineers responsible for the Washington Square project, proposed an innovative structural system that enhanced the efficiency of the concrete tower and improved its ability to meet the seismic requirements outlined in the building code. Instead of positioning the concrete "shear core" around the elevator shaft as typically done in high-rise construction, it was relocated to the perimeter of the interior hallway. This relocation resulted in a stronger structure due to the increased cross-section of the shear core. Additionally, this modification eliminated the need for extra columns and created quieter residential units by introducing a 24-inch-thick (610 mm) wall of dense concrete to separate the public corridor from the individual units. Washington Square was constructed to meet seismic category "D," which is among the most stringent categories and ensures the building's capacity to withstand earthquakes measuring 7-8 on the Richter Scale.

== Exterior curtain wall and windows ==
The curtain wall system of the Washington Square project underwent a $6 million upgrade. Due to the absence of rectangular columns on the exterior, it allows for the application of a "curtain wall system." This system consists of metal panels with built-in insulation. The curtain wall is attached to the building's edge, further enhancing thermal isolation within the interior. Apart from providing a sleek exterior appearance, the curtain wall system minimizes the presence of ledges or caulk joints that could allow moisture penetration. The use of low-E glass coating aids in blocking UV rays during the summer and retaining heat in the winter.
