= Kemper Freeman =

American politician

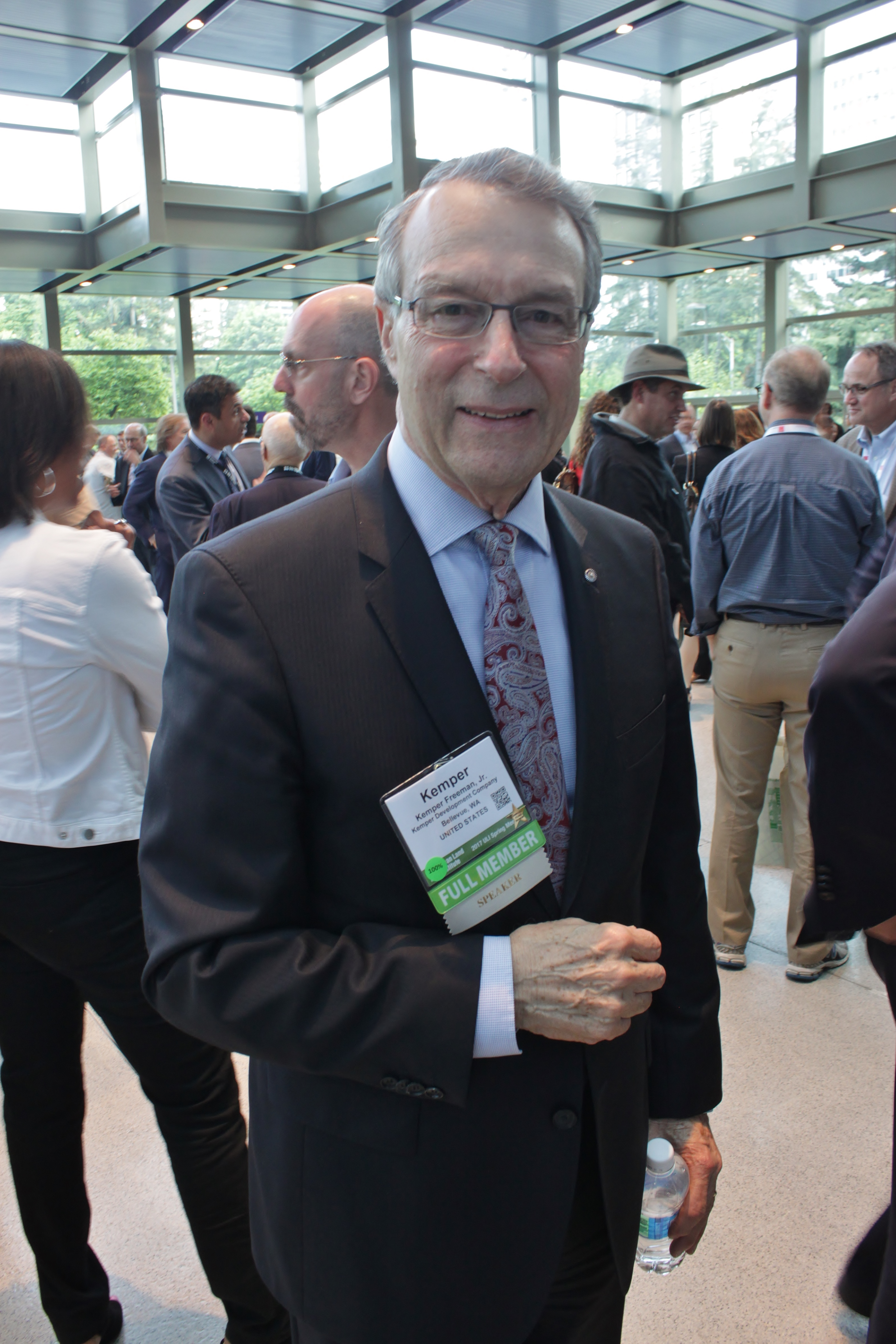
- Freeman in 2017

Member of the Washington House of Representatives from the 48th district
- In office January 8, 1973 – December 31, 1976
- Preceded by: John D. Jones
- Succeeded by: Paul Sanders

Personal details
- Born: Frederick Kemper Freeman Jr. October 23, 1941 (age 85)
- Party: Independent
- Spouse: Betty Austin
- Children: Amy Schreck and Suzanne McQuaid
- Parent(s): Frederick Kemper Freeman Sr. and Clotilde Freeman (née Duryee)
- Education: Bellevue High School
- Profession: Real estate developer
- Known for: Kemper Development Company

Frederick Kemper Freeman Jr. (born October 23, 1941) is the active chairman and CEO of Kemper Development Company, which built and operates Bellevue Square, Bellevue Place, and Lincoln Square, all located in Bellevue, Washington. Kemper represents the third generation of the Freeman family, who have been involved in the growth of the Bellevue community since 1897. He is a former Republican member of the Washington State House of Representatives from the 48th district and publicly active in conversations about traffic and transportation in Bellevue, opposing the development of light rail.

== Freeman family ==
Kemper Freeman Jr. is a third-generation resident of Bellevue, Washington. His grandfather, Miller Freeman, was active in state politics and public affairs, including promoting the development of a bridge connecting Seattle, Mercer Island, and Bellevue, and acting as a driving force in anti-Japanese discrimination, agitating for what he called a "white man's Pacific coast". Beginning in 1907, Miller Freeman was a prominent voice calling for the segregation or deportation of Japanese immigrants, whom he saw as a threat to white prosperity. He founded the Anti-Japanese League of Washington in 1916 and was a vocal proponent for the state's 1921 alien land laws, the 1924 Immigration Act, and the 1942 incarceration of American citizens of Japanese ancestry in concentration camps during World War II, during which he developed the land confiscated from those interned.

Freeman Jr.'s father, Frederick Kemper Freeman Sr., led the development of what is now Bellevue Square, which opened in 1946. He also was involved in building Bellevue's first hospital, Overlake Hospital Medical Center. Kemper Freeman Jr. was born on October 23, 1941. He married Betty Austin in 1965 and has two daughters, Amy Schreck and Suzanne Razwick.

== Career ==
In 1973, Freeman Jr. was appointed to a vacant seat in the Washington State House of Representatives as a Democratic representing the 48th district. After serving for three years, he resigned from the seat to focus on his business in building and development. He then began working full-time on the expansion and enclosure of Bellevue Square with his father, which re-opened in 1981. In early-1980, Freeman Jr. founded the Kemper Development Company, which has overseen the continued expansion of Bellevue Square as well as development of:

- Bellevue Place, a mixed use property that opened in 1988, housing office space, retail, dining options, and the Hyatt Regency Bellevue.
- Lincoln Square, which opened in 2005 with condominiums, a movie theater, a bowling alley, restaurants, retail, office space, and the Westin Bellevue.

In total, the three properties (Bellevue Square, Bellevue Place, Lincoln Square) makeup the Bellevue Collection, covering approximately 50 acres of land in downtown Bellevue. In 2016, Bloomberg reported all of Freeman's holdings had a worth of "about $2 billion" of which Freeman and his two daughters owned a majority stake.

In 2025, Freeman “stepped back” as CEO of Kemper Development Co. In 2026, former company President James Melby took over the role.

== Political involvement ==
Freeman Jr. often speaks out against mass transit. In 1995 and 1996, Freeman Jr. led a campaign opposing the creation of a regional transit authority which later became Sound Transit, arguing "the automobile has won". In 2004 and 2008, Freeman backed state initiatives to convert HOV lanes and bus lanes to general traffic.

Freeman has been a consistent opponent of Sound Transit's light rail plans. In 2002, the Freeman-backed group Sane Transit sued Sound Transit after the 1 Line was reduced in scope, alleging that a reduction in project scope required the agency to put the issue to another public vote. In 2008, Freeman campaigned against the plan to bring light rail to downtown Bellevue, and backed city council candidates in an effort to route the new light rail line alongside the I-405 freeway, away from population centers. Freeman sued Sound Transit in 2009, arguing that the use of the I-90 HOV lanes for light rail was illegal. The suit was ultimately rejected after being appealed to the Washington State Supreme Court. In 2011, Freeman supported Tim Eyman's Initiative 1125, a proposed tolling measure containing a subtle clause prohibiting any "non-highway purpose" for I-90. In 2016, Freeman spent $210,000 in opposition to Sound Transit 3, making up two-thirds of the nearly $316,000 donated to the "No on ST3" campaign. Freeman called the plan a "major calamity", criticizing the plan's timeline, cost, and scope.

Freeman's motivations stem from a belief that cars provide significantly more personal freedom than transit. He believes that socialist nations have failed in part due to their reliance on public transportation. Critics have accused him of being motivated by classism, arguing that a 2005 comment about the Southcenter mall indicates his disdain for those who can't afford to shop at Bellevue Square: "When you walk through the [Southcenter] mall, the way the customer dresses just to shop there—the light blue and pink hair curlers, the shoes that flop, flop, flop along—it’s a completely different customer," said Freeman. "Yet we are 12 miles apart."

== Community involvement ==
Freeman Jr. holds leadership appointments in several community and economic development organizations in the Bellevue area, including:

- Co-chair of the capital campaign and member of the Executive Committee for the Performing Arts Center Eastside (PACE), a series of five venues under construction in Bellevue that will feature theater, dance, and music when complete. The land for PACE was donated by Freeman Jr., who has also made a joint commitment with Microsoft to provide additional funding.
- Trustee for Overlake Hospital Medical Center
- Former Board Member of Bellevue LifeSpring, formerly Overlake Service League
