= Bellevue 600 =

Proposed high-rise office building in Bellevue, Washington, United States

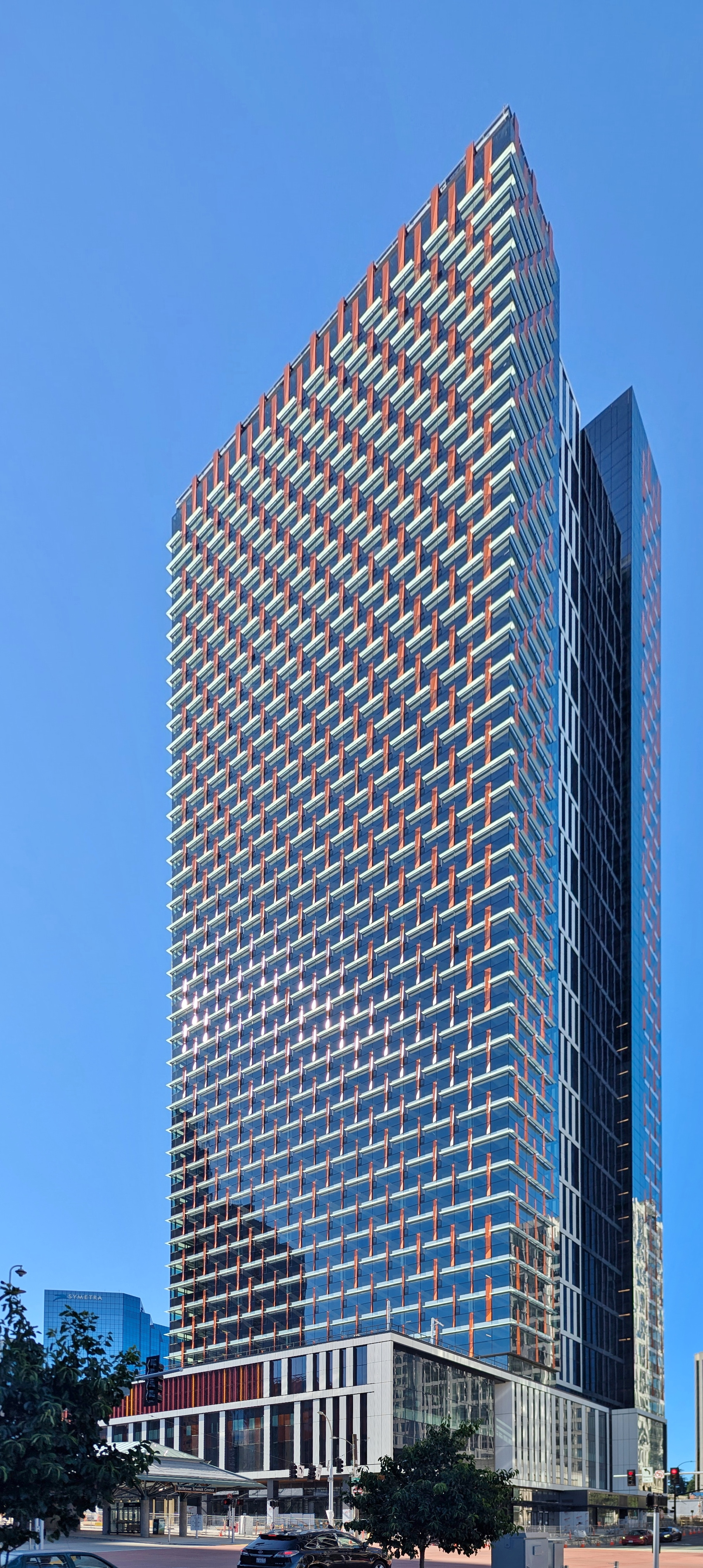
- Under construction in July 2025
- Interactive map of the Bellevue 600 area

General information
- Status: Topped-out
- Type: Office and retail
- Location: 600 108th Avenue Northeast; Bellevue, Washington, U.S.
- Coordinates: 47°36′57″N 122°11′42″W
- Construction started: March 2021
- Topped-out: September 2024
- Estimated completion: 2027
- Owner: Amazon

Height
- Architectural: 600 ft (180 m)

Technical details
- Floor count: 43
- Floor area: 1,036,000 square feet (96,200 m^{2})

Design and construction
- Architecture firm: NBBJ
- Developer: Amazon
- Structural engineer: Magnusson Klemencic Associates
- Main contractor: Sellen Construction

Other information
- Parking: 1,175 spaces

Bellevue 600 is a future high-rise office building developed by Amazon in Bellevue, Washington, United States. It began construction in 2021 and is scheduled to be completed in 2027. The 43-story, 600-foot-tall (180 m) building would join 555 Tower as the tallest building in Bellevue. The project is located in Downtown Bellevue at the intersection of Northeast 6th Street and 110th Avenue Northeast, adjacent to the Bellevue Transit Center and its Bellevue Downtown Link light rail station. A second phase would construct a 27-story tower to the west, replacing an existing office building.

== History ==
Bellevue 600 is planned to be located on a block bound to the south by Northeast 6th Street, to the west by 108th Avenue Northeast, and to the east by 110th Avenue Northeast. The Bellevue Corporate Center, a 10-story office building on the southwest corner of the block, was built in 1980 to serve as the regional office of Honeywell. A three-story parking garage with 650 stalls was built on the southeast corner of the block and was later joined by a customer service center for the Bellevue Transit Center that opened in 2006. The north half of the block is occupied by a church and a surface parking lot, both of which were sold in 2014 and 2015 to a developer planning a three-tower residential complex.

In February 2016, Seattle developer Touchstone and Chicago developer Equity Group Investments applied for permits to build a 34-story office building and 41-story hotel with 500 rooms on the south half of the block, which would retain the Bellevue Corporate Center. The master development plan for the project, named "Bellevue 600", was approved by the city government in April 2017 with minor conditions, but Touchstone and Equity did not plan to begin construction. The approved design included a shared podium between the two towers, an underground parking garage with 1,960 stalls, and a pedestrian bridge connecting to a future development on the north side of the block.

Equity Commonwealth, a sister company to Equity Group, retained ownership of the Bellevue Corporate Center and the full 3.5-acre (1.4 ha) property and renovated the building in 2016. The property and project rights were sold to Amazon in April 2019 for $194.9 million through a shell corporation named Acorn Development. A revised design plan from NBBJ for a 43-story office building was filed for permitting in July 2019, taking advantage of a city zoning change in 2017 that allows buildings with heights of up to 600 feet (180 m). Amazon announced that it planned to begin construction in 2021 and open the building by 2024 as part of a major expansion into Bellevue with 15,000 total employees in the city.

The Bellevue city government granted planning approval for the first phase of the Bellevue 600 project in January 2021. Construction began in March 2021 with demolition of the parking garage on the site. The tower topped out in September 2024 and interior construction resumed in early 2026 with a completion date of 2027 for the first portions of Bellevue 600.

== Design ==
The 43-story, 600-foot-tall (180 m) tower would be the tallest building in Bellevue and the tallest to be built by Amazon, surpassing its Seattle campus. It is planned to include 885,000 square feet (82,200 m^{2}) of office space, 121,000 square feet (11,200 m^{2}) of office amenities, and 14,000 square feet (1,300 m^{2}) of retail space, including a potential daycare. The complex would have an underground parking garage with 1,175 stalls that would be shared with a potential 33-story, 430-foot (130 m) tower on the southwest corner of the block. A four-story, 16,000-square-foot (1,500 m^{2}) meeting center and public plaza would be located at the southeast corner of the block, facing the Bellevue Downtown light rail station. It is designed by Seattle-based NBBJ and is planned to be built by Sellen Construction, working with various contractors and consultants; both companies previously worked with Amazon on their Seattle campus.

A second tower on the southwest corner of the block, replacing the Bellevue Corporate Center, is also planned as part of the Bellevue 600 project. It was initially proposed as a 33-story, 571-foot (174 m) office building, but was later reduced to 27 stories and 392 feet (119 m). The second tower will have 764,000 square feet (71,000 m^{2}) of office space, 13,800 square feet (1,280 m^{2}) of retail and exhibition space on the ground floor, and a childcare center. Its underground parking garage—connected to the first building's garage—will have six levels with 718 stalls for cars and 1,000 stalls for bicycles. Excavation for the second tower began in June 2023 and the 1.75-acre (0.71 ha) site was topped with a temporary parkspace that opened in April 2026.

== See also ==
- List of tallest buildings in Bellevue, Washington
