= Phil Talmadge =

American judge

Justice of the Washington Supreme Court
- In office 1995–2001
- Preceded by: James A. Andersen
- Succeeded by: Susan Owens

Member of the Washington State Senate from the 34th district
- In office 1979–1995
- Preceded by: Nancy Buffington
- Succeeded by: Michael Heavey

Personal details
- Born: April 23, 1952 (age 74) Seattle, Washington, U.S.
- Party: Democratic

Philip Albert Talmadge (born April 23, 1952) is an American politician, attorney, and jurist, who is currently a partner at the Seattle, Washington law firm Talmadge/Fitzpatrick. Talmadge graduated from Yale University and received a J.D. from the University of Washington. From 1979 to 1995 he represented West Seattle in the Washington State Senate, earning a reputation as a liberal reformer. After leaving the legislature, Talmadge served a single six-year term on the Supreme Court of Washington. In 2004 he was a candidate for the Democratic Party nomination for Governor of Washington, but withdrew from the race in the face of lackluster polling and personal health problems.
