= List of tallest buildings in Tacoma =

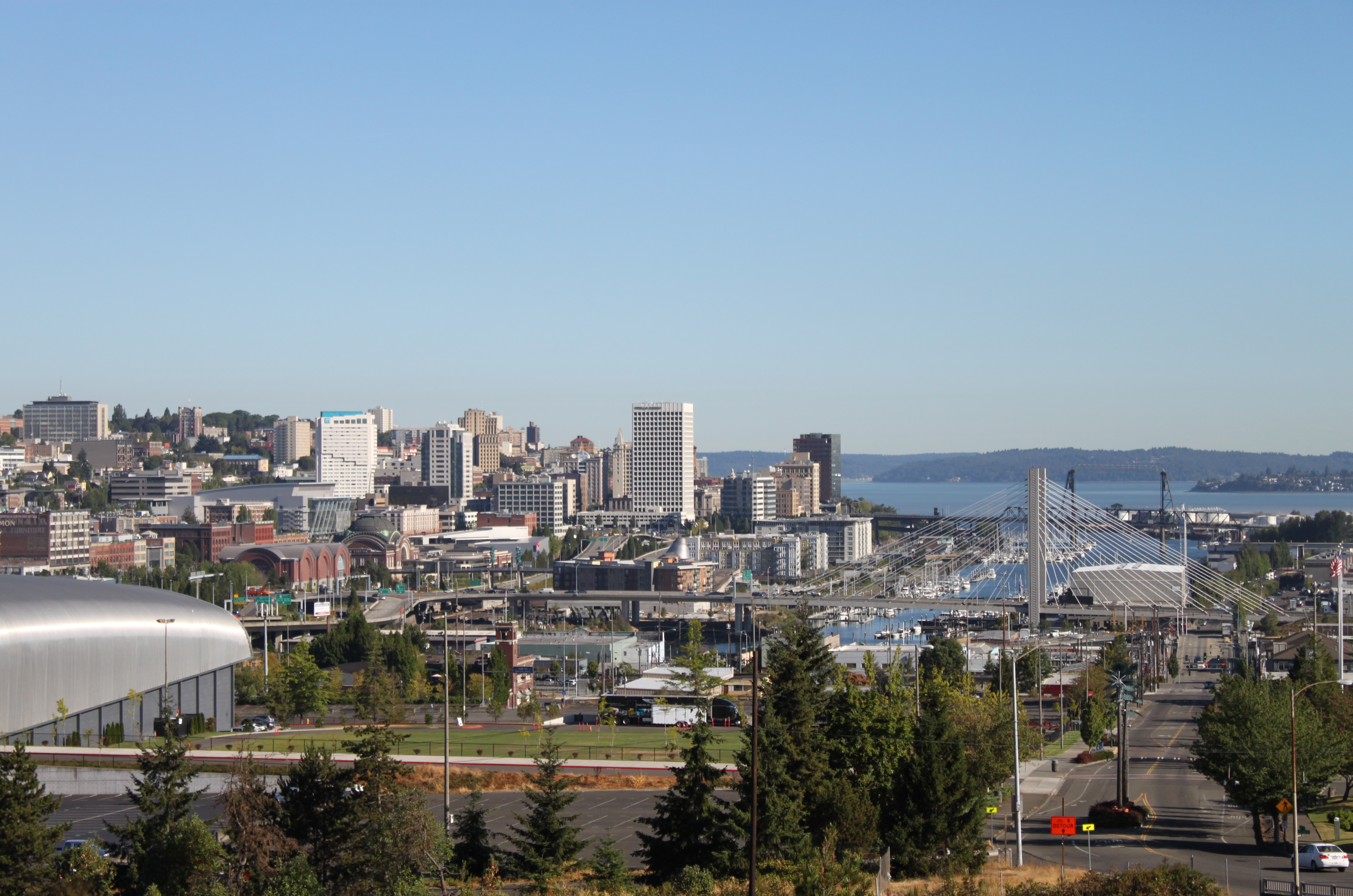
View of Downtown Tacoma from the south

This list of the tallest buildings in Tacoma ranks the tallest buildings in Tacoma, Washington, by height. The tallest building in Tacoma is the 338-foot (103 m) 1201 Pacific (formerly Wells Fargo Plaza). Tacoma is the 3rd largest city in Washington and part of the Seattle metropolitan area; its buildings rank below those in Seattle and Bellevue. The city has two buildings that are over 240 feet (73 m) in height.

== Tallest buildings ==
The following list ranks the tallest buildings in Tacoma by height. All the buildings on this list stand at least 200 ft (61 m) tall. The list includes the rank of the building, the name of the building, the height of the building in feet and meters, the amount of floors the building has, the year the building built, and notes.

Rank	Name	Image	Height ft (m)	Floors	Year	Notes	Ref
1	1201 Pacific		338 (103)	25	1970	Tallest building in Tacoma. Formerly Wells Fargo Plaza.	
2	Hotel Murano		278 (84.7)	26	1984		
3	Marriott Tacoma Downtown		264 (80.5)	21	2019		
4	Washington Building		237 (72.3)	17	1925		
5	Tacoma Municipal Building		233 (71)	15	1931	Originally the Rhodes Medical Arts Building; purchased by the city in 1977. Now houses city hall and is a registered city landmark. Art deco exterior and interior, marble lobby with three-story spiral staircase.	
6	Key Bank Tower		232 (70.7)	17	1911	Tallest building in Tacoma from 1911 to 1925. This building was renovated between 1999 and 2001.	
7	Tacoma Financial Center		230 (70.1)	17	1983		

== See also ==
- List of tallest buildings in Seattle
