= Tower 12 =

Apartment building in Seattle, Washington, U.S.

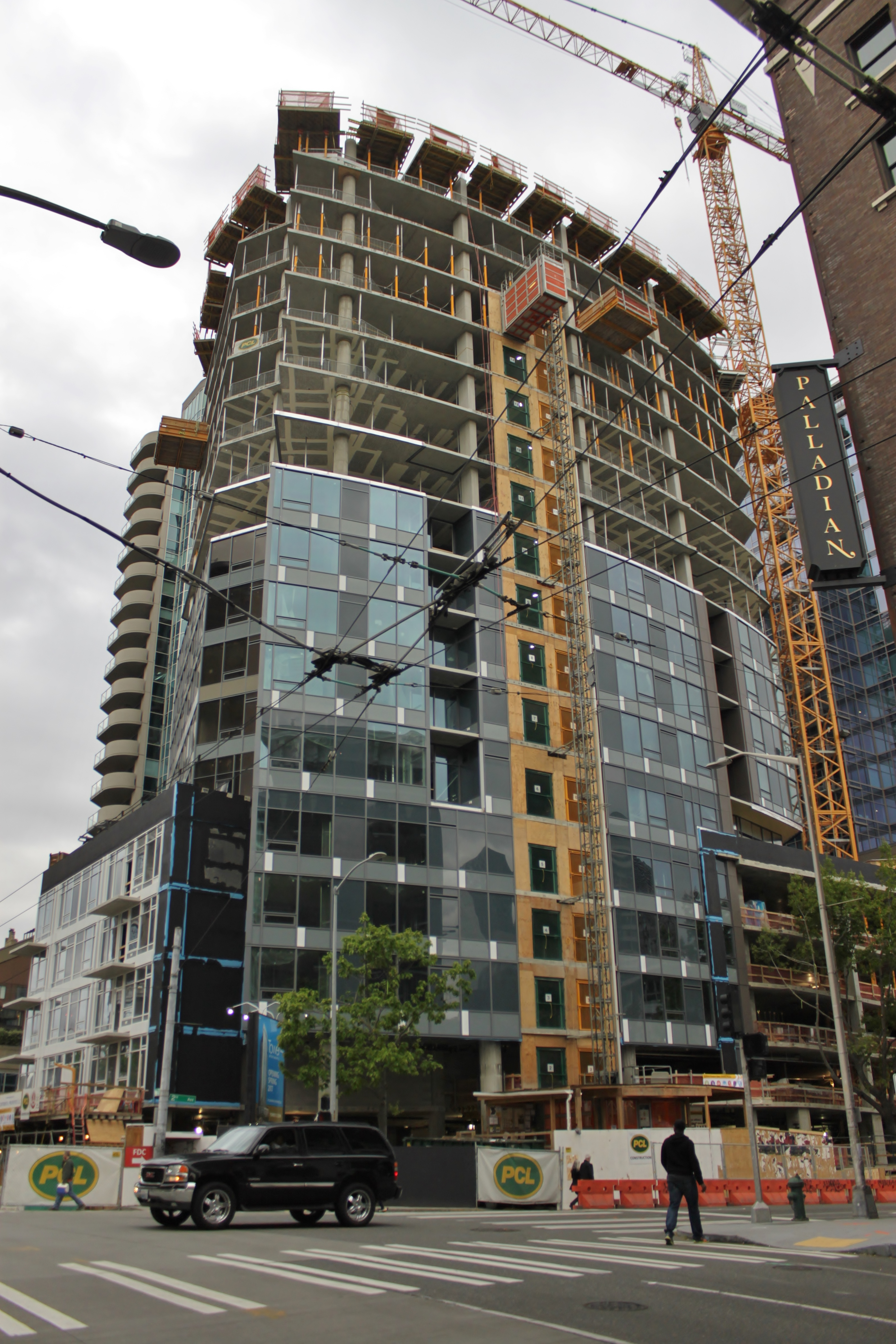
- Under construction in April 2016

- Location within Downtown Seattle
- Alternative names: Tower 12 Apartments

General information
- Status: Completed
- Type: Residential
- Location: 2015 2nd Avenue; Seattle, Washington
- Coordinates: 47°36′42.28″N 122°20′32.60″W
- Groundbreaking: March 27, 2015
- Opened: May 2017
- Cost: $75 million

Height
- Architectural: 392 feet (119 m)

Technical details
- Floor count: 34

Design and construction
- Architecture firm: MG2
- Developer: Continental Properties
- Main contractor: PCL Construction

Other information
- Number of units: 314 apartments
- Parking: 336 parking stalls

Website
- tower12.com

Tower 12 is an apartment building in Seattle, Washington. The 34-story, 392-foot-tall (119 m) skyscraper has 314 apartments as well as 7,000 square feet (650 m^{2}) of ground-level retail space. It is located at the northwest corner of 2nd Avenue and Virginia Street near Pike Place Market and Victor Steinbrueck Park at the southwestern edge of the Belltown neighborhood.

The project's name, Tower 12, is a reference to the "12th man", a nickname for fans of the Seattle Seahawks football team.

== History ==
The 2nd & Virginia site was formerly proposed as part of a $67 million condominium project in the early 1990s called "One Pacific Towers", which would have had two 27-story towers with 145 units in each, that was later cancelled. In 2008, developer Justen Company submitted proposals to build a 39-story, 234-unit condominium building on the same site, part of a two-tower project spanning Virginia Street, but did not move further on into the design review process.

Bellevue-based developer Continental Properties bought the quarter-block property and master-use permit in March 2014 for $16 million, and announced plans to build a 324-unit residential building on the site using the previously-approved master-use permit. Initially planning to build condominiums, Continental instead opted to build apartments (later named "Tower 12") because of the higher value and lower risk involved.

Construction of the building began on March 27, 2015 and the building opened on May 1, 2017. The building was topped out in August 2016. Tower 12 was completed in mid-2017 and acquired by Weidner Apartment Homes for $225 million in October.
