= 1201 Pacific =

Tallest building in Tacoma, Washington

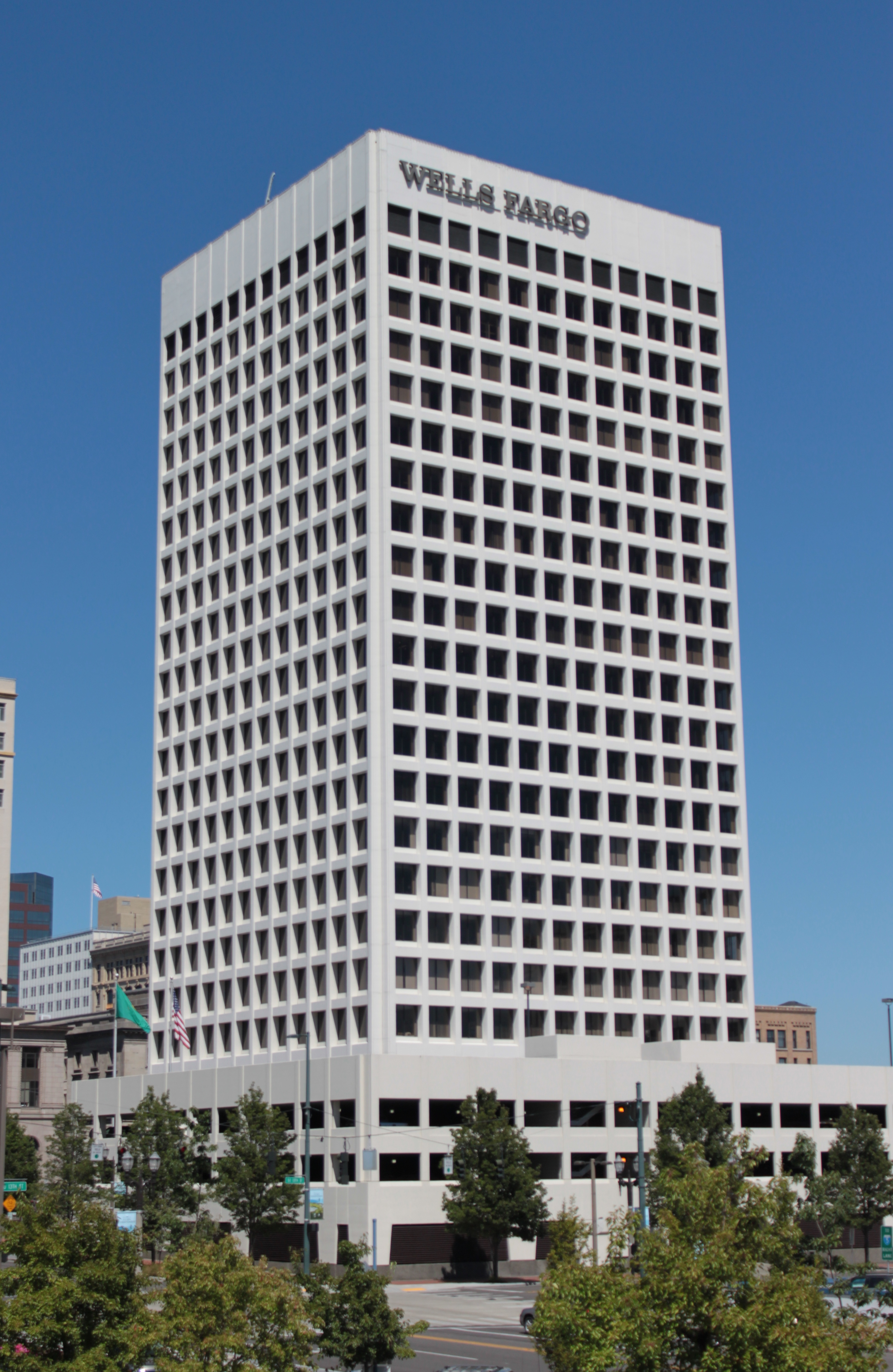
- Wells Fargo Plaza from Commerce Street
- Interactive map of the 1201 Pacific area
- Former names: Wells Fargo Plaza, Bank of Washington Plaza, First Interstate Plaza

General information
- Status: Completed
- Type: Commercial offices
- Location: 1201 Pacific Avenue; Tacoma, Washington
- Coordinates: 47.252194°N 122.437429°W
- Construction started: 1969
- Completed: 1970
- Renovated: 1988
- Cost: $14 million
- Owner: Unico Properties

Height
- Architectural: 338 ft (103 m)
- Roof: 290 ft (88 m)

Technical details
- Floor count: 25
- Floor area: 308,000 sq ft (28,600 m^{2})

Design and construction
- Architect: Skidmore, Owings and Merrill

Other information
- Parking: 418

1201 Pacific, formerly the Wells Fargo Plaza, is the tallest building in Tacoma, Washington, and was completed in 1970. It was built with help from investors such as George Weyerhaeuser and Ben Cheney, and was designed by Skidmore, Owings and Merrill.

The $14 million building was announced in 1968 and uses land that was cleared under Tacoma's urban renewal program. It was originally built for the National Bank of Washington, which was acquired in 1970 by Pacific National Bank (later First Interstate Bank of Washington), in turn acquired in 1996 by Wells Fargo. It was known as the Wells Fargo Center until 2016, when it lost its naming rights.

The building, now owned by Unico Properties, was awarded LEED Silver certification in 2011.

== See also ==
- List of tallest buildings in Tacoma
