= City Center East (Bellevue) =

High-rise office building in Bellevue, Washington

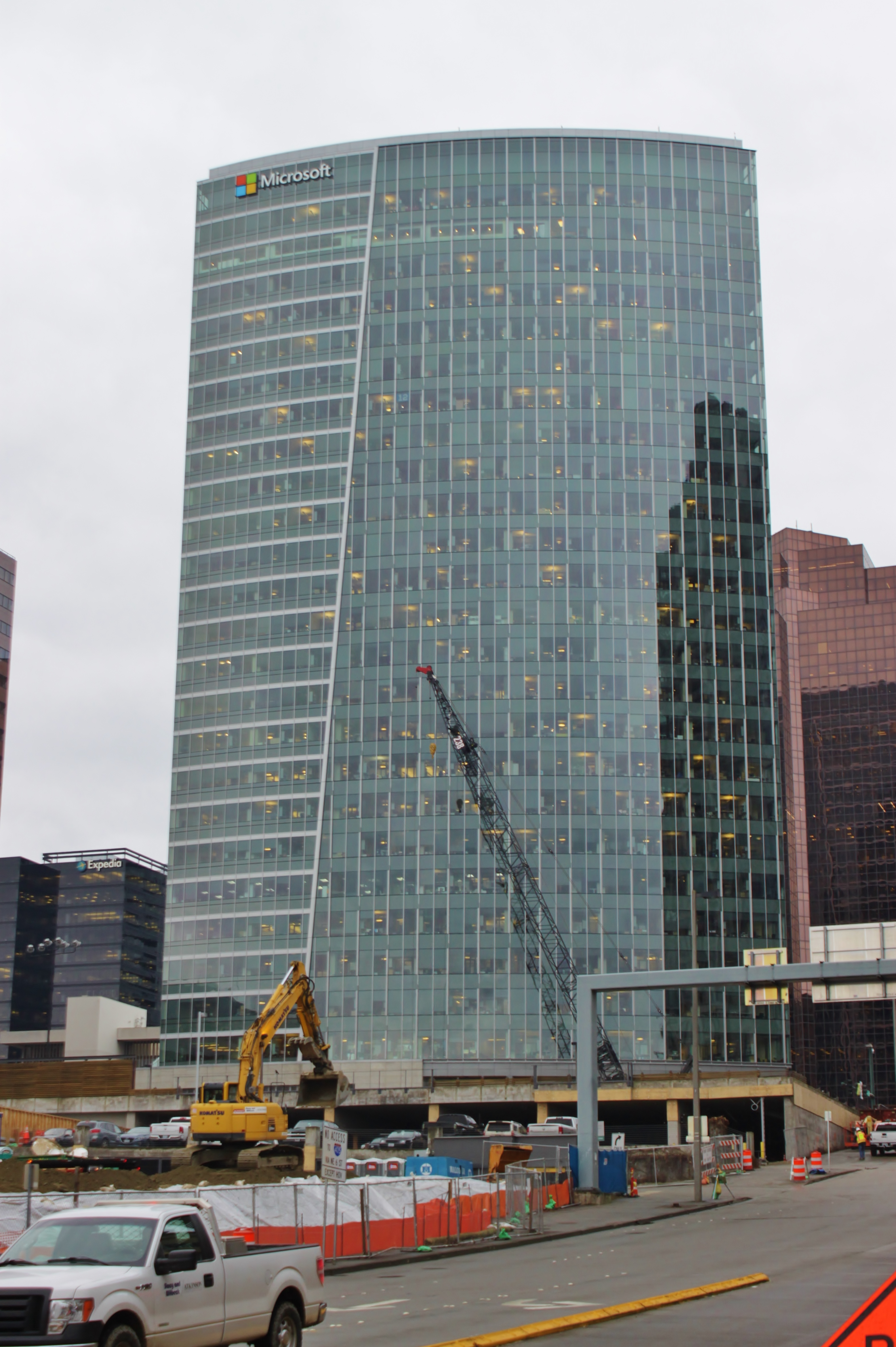
- Interactive map of the City Center East area

General information
- Type: Office building
- Architectural style: Modernist
- Location: 555 110th Avenue NE; Bellevue, Washington, US
- Coordinates: 47°36′54″N 122°11′39″W
- Construction started: 2006
- Completed: 2009

Height
- Height: 360 ft (110 m)

Technical details
- Floor count: 26
- Floor area: 583,000 sq ft (54,200 m^{2})

Design and construction
- Architect: Zimmer Gunsul Frasca Partnership

Other information
- Parking: 1,145 stalls

City Center East, also known as City Center Plaza, is a high-rise office building in Bellevue, Washington, US. The 26-story, 360-foot (110 m) tower was completed in 2009 and entirely leased by Microsoft until 2023. Microsoft's Bing development team as well as many AI teams were headquartered there. It is located adjacent to the Bellevue Transit Center and its sister building, City Center Bellevue, which was completed in 1986.

The building was originally proposed as a 34-story, 450-foot (140 m) office tower prior to its downsizing in 2005. City Center East was originally owned by Beacon Capital Partners before it was sold to Cole Real Estate Investments for $310 million in 2010. It was sold again to CommonWealth Partners in 2012, for $347.7 million, a 21 percent increase.
