= MG2 (company) =

American architecture firm

- Industry: Architecture
- Founded: 1971
- Headquarters: Seattle, Washington, United States
- Key people: Mitch Smith (CEO); Russ Hazzard (President)
- Number of employees: 400+
- Website: mg2.com

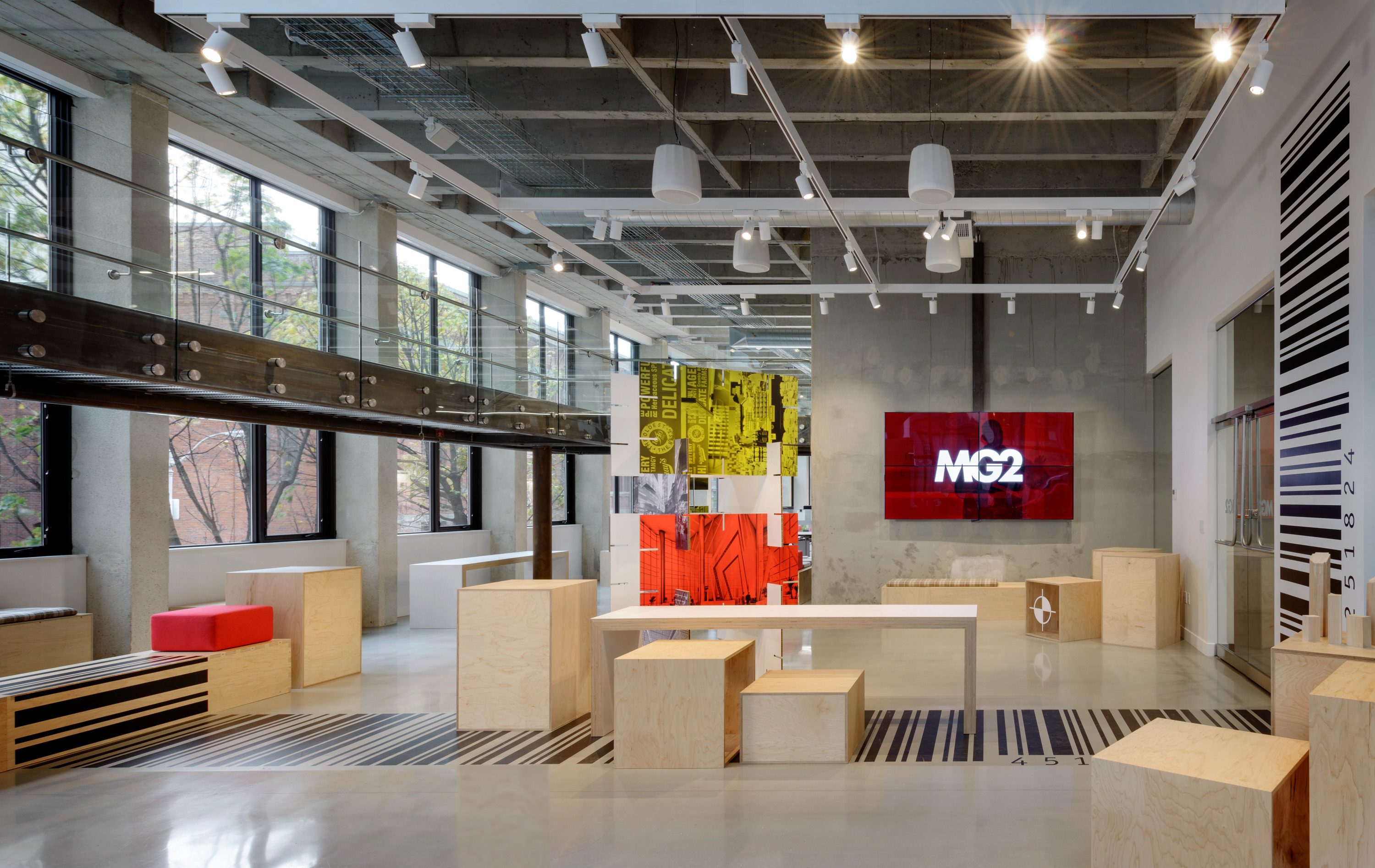
First floor exhibit space in MG2's headquarters in Seattle

MG2 (formerly MulvannyG2 Architecture) is an architecture firm based in Seattle, Washington, United States. MG2 is ranked among the 50 largest architectural firms and top two retail designers in the world. The firm designs retail stores and centers, corporate offices and interiors, and mixed-use destinations for clients and brands of global significance. Clients include seven of the top 20 Fortune 100 retailers.

Founded in 1971, the firm employs over 400 in six offices located in: Seattle, Washington; Irvine, California; Washington, D.C.; New York City, NY; Minneapolis, MN; and Shanghai, China. Since 2015, it has been led by CEO and chairman Mitch Smith and president Russ Hazzard. As of 2013, MG2 is the third-largest architecture firm in the Puget Sound region by annual revenue, behind Callison and NBBJ. Among its major clients is Costco, which has contracted with MG2 for the design of over 800 locations globally.

In May 2015, the firm changed its name to MG2 and moved its headquarters from Bellevue, Washington to 1101 Second Avenue in Downtown Seattle. In December 2024, MG2 announced that it would enter a partnership with Colliers International and eventually rename itself to Colliers Engineering & Design.

== Notable projects ==
- Tower 12, Seattle, Washington, 2017
- 1101 Westlake, Seattle, Washington, 2016
- MG2 Headquarters, Seattle, Washington, 2015
- Uniqlo flagship store, Boston, Massachusetts, 2015
- Emerald City Commons, Seattle, Washington, 2013
- Tonkon Torp, LLP, Portland, Oregon, 2011
- Trolley Square, Salt Lake City, Utah, 2011
- Bellevue Towers, Bellevue, Washington, 2009
- Hyatt at Olive 8, Seattle, Washington, 2009
- Escala at 4th & Virginia, Seattle, Washington, 2009
- Fashion Place, Murray, Utah, 2007
- Fujian Provincial Electric and Power Company Headquarters, Fuzhou, China, 2007
- Redmond City Hall, Redmond, Washington, 2006
- Greater Tacoma Convention Center, Tacoma, Washington, 2004
- Shanghai Fudan Crown Plaza Hotel, Shanghai, China, 2005
- China Construction Bank, Xiamen, China, 2003
- Seattle Grand Hyatt Hotel, Seattle, Washington, 2001
