= Paul Sanders (politician) =

American politician from Washington

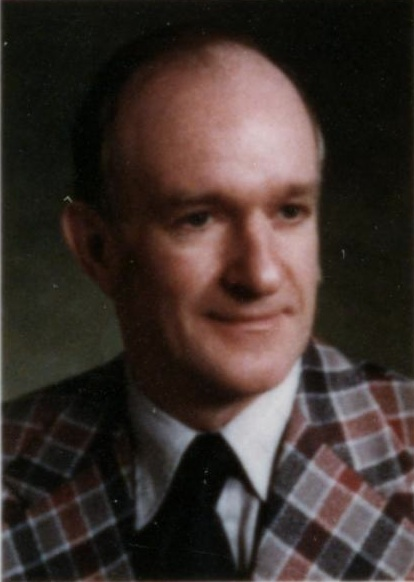
- Sanders in 1977

Member of the Washington House of Representatives from the 48th district
- In office December 31, 1976 – January 9, 1989
- Preceded by: Kemper Freeman
- Succeeded by: Steve Van Luven

Personal details
- Born: September 5, 1927 Kittery Point, Maine, U.S.
- Party: Republican
- Spouse: Helen

Paul F. Sanders (born September 5, 1927) is a former American politician in the state of Washington. He served the 48th district from 1976 to 1989.
