= 400 Building =

Building in Bellevue, Washington, United States

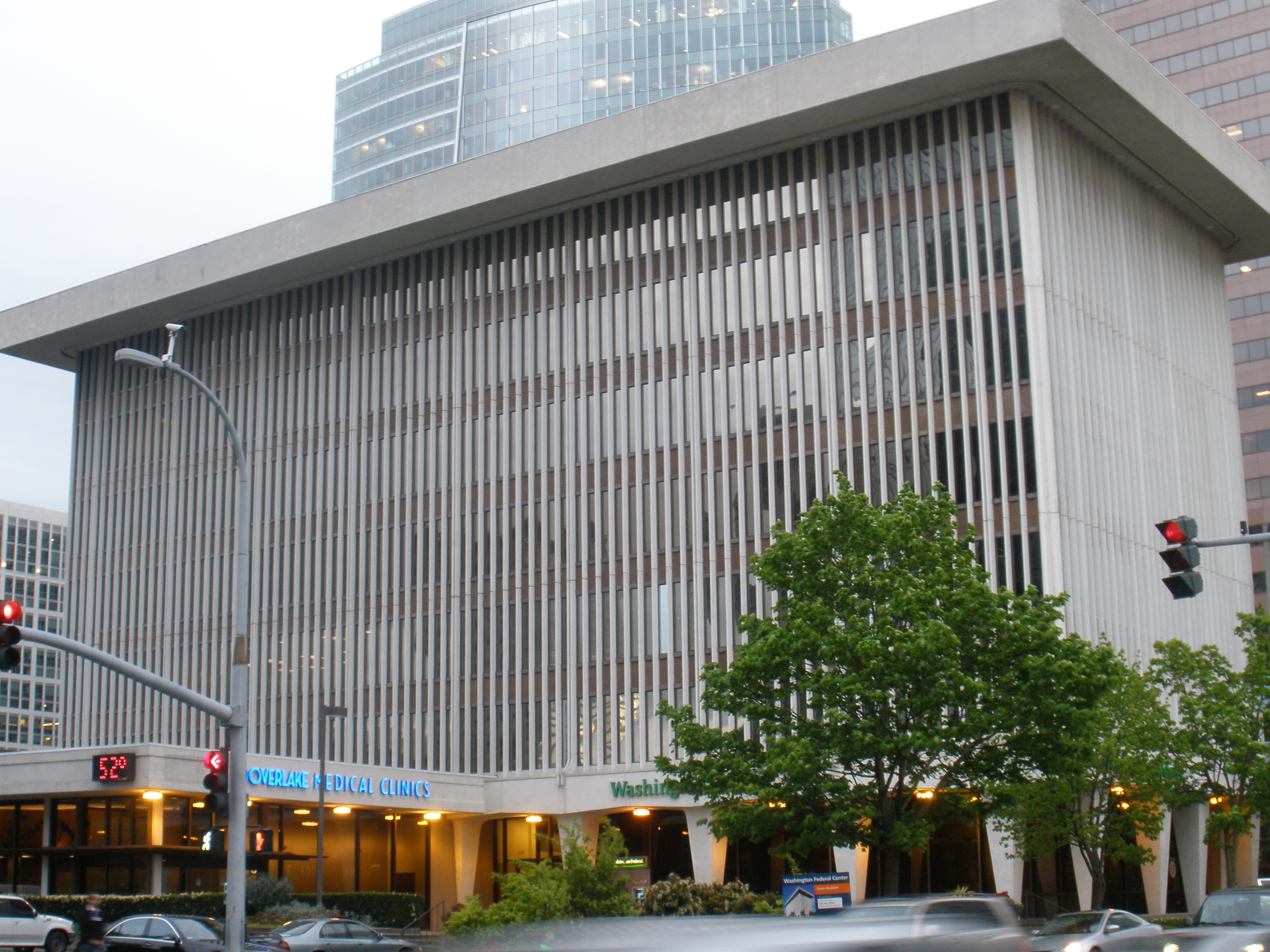
- Interactive map of the 400 Building area

Record height
- Tallest in Bellevue from 1967 to 1970^{[I]}
- Preceded by: Puget Power Building
- Surpassed by: Paccar Tower

General information
- Status: Completed
- Location: 400 108th Avenue NE, Bellevue, Washington, United States
- Coordinates: 47.614°N 122.196°W
- Construction started: 1966
- Completed: 1967
- Renovated: 2007–2010
- Renovation cost: > $1 million
- Owner: Washington Federal Bank
- Landlord: Unico Properties

Height
- Height: 92 feet (28 m)

Technical details
- Structural system: Reinforced concrete
- Floor count: 7
- Floor area: 75,000 ft^{2} (7,000 m^{2})

Design and construction
- Architecture firm: Parr, Roderick, and Associates

The 400 Building, also known as the First Mutual Center and Washington Federal Center, is a seven story tall building in Bellevue, Washington. When it was completed in 1967, it was the tallest building in Bellevue.

Records
Preceded by Puget Power Building	Tallest building in Bellevue, Washington; 1967–1970	Succeeded by Paccar Tower
