= Steven González =

American judge (born 1963)

Chief Justice of the Washington Supreme Court
- In office January 11, 2021 – January 13, 2025
- Preceded by: Debra L. Stephens
- Succeeded by: Debra L. Stephens

Associate Justice of the Washington Supreme Court
- Incumbent
- Assumed office January 1, 2012
- Appointed by: Christine Gregoire
- Preceded by: Gerry L. Alexander

Personal details
- Born: October 1, 1963 (age 62) Los Angeles, California, U.S.
- Relatives: Ben Harper (cousin)
- Education: Pitzer College (BA); University of California, Berkeley (JD)

Steven Charles González (born October 1, 1963) is an American lawyer who served as the chief justice of the Washington Supreme Court from 2021 to 2025. He was appointed as an associate justice by Governor Christine Gregoire and took office on January 1, 2012. González replaced Justice Gerry L. Alexander, who retired upon reaching the mandatory retirement age of 75.

== Biography ==
Born and raised in Los Angeles, González is descended on his father's side from refugees from the Mexican Revolution; his maternal ancestors immigrated at the turn of the 20th century from eastern Europe. González was raised by his mother, who is Jewish.

González graduated with honors from Pitzer College in Claremont, California, with a Bachelor of Arts in East Asian studies in 1985. While at Pitzer, he studied abroad at Waseda University in Tokyo and Nanjing University in China. He worked as a paralegal in Century City after graduation from college. Before law school, González received a Rotary International scholarship to study international trade in Japan for 21 months. After studying economics at Hokkaido University, he enrolled at the University of California, Berkeley, School of Law, where he earned his Juris Doctor and met his wife, Michelle Gonzalez. After graduating in 1991, Gonzalez passed the Washington State bar exam and was admitted to practice in November 1991.

After a career in private practice, González served as an Assistant City Attorney for the City of Seattle, where he prosecuted domestic violence cases, including cases of elder and child abuse. He then served as an assistant United States attorney in the United States District Court for the Western District of Washington from 1997 to 2002. In March 2002, Governor Gary Locke appointed him a judge of the King County Superior Court. He won a contested primary that September, and was reelected unopposed to four-year terms in 2004 and 2008.

González's cousin is musician Ben Harper.

== Legal career ==
González has worked in both criminal and civil law. While in private practice, he worked as an associate in the Business Law Department of Hillis Clark Martin & Peterson in Seattle. He then served as a Domestic Violence Prosecutor for the City of Seattle in 1996 and 1997 and as an Assistant United States Attorney in the Western District of Washington from 1997 to 2002, during which time he was part of the team that successfully prosecuted the international terrorism case US vs Ressam. He received the U.S. Attorney General's Award for Distinguished Service and the Director's Award for Superior Performance for his work on the case. González has served on the board of directors of El Centro de la Raza and the steering committee of the Northwest Minority Job Fair.

== Judicial career ==
In 2012, Governor Christine Gregoire appointed González to the Washington Supreme Court. He replaced Justice Gerry L. Alexander, who retired upon reaching the mandatory retirement age of 75. Before joining the Supreme Court, González served on the Washington State Access to Justice Board for seven years, including two as Chair. He chairs the Washington Interpreter Commission and the Court's Security and Technology Committees. On November 6, 2020, González was elected to be Chief Justice by his peer, effective January 11, 2021.

González has received “Judge of the Year” awards from the Washington State Bar Association, the Washington Chapter of the American Board of Trial Advocates and the Asian Bar Association of Washington. He also received the Vanguard Award from the King County Chapter of Washington Women Lawyers and the Exceptional Member Award from the Latina/o Bar Association of Washington. Beginning in 2017, he taught state constitutional law at Gonzaga University School of Law.

In October 2018, González concurred in the result when the court abolished the state's death penalty because they found its racist imposition violated the Constitution of Washington.

== Electoral history ==
After being appointed to the King County Superior Court, González was elected to the bench in 2002 and reelected in 2004 and 2008. In 2012, he was elected to a full six-year term on the Washington State Supreme Court, Position 8, with nearly 60% of the vote. At that time, judicial elections occurred in the primary. The election was the subject of significant news coverage due to González's opponent's lack of qualifications and Central Washington's racially polarized voting patterns. During the election, he was rated “Exceptionally Well Qualified” by the King County Bar Association and other bar associations.

González was reelected to the Washington State Supreme Court in 2018. On November 5, 2020, he was elected by his peers to serve as chief justice. He took office as chief justice on January 11, 2021.

== See also ==
- List of Hispanic and Latino American jurists

Legal offices
Preceded by Gerry L. Alexander	Associate Justice of the Washington Supreme Court; 2012–present	Incumbent
Preceded by Debra L. Stephens	Chief Justice of the Washington Supreme Court; 2021–present	Incumbent
