= Susan Owens =

American judge (1949–2025)

Associate Justice of the Washington Supreme Court
- In office January 1, 2001 – December 31, 2024
- Preceded by: Phil Talmadge
- Succeeded by: Sal Mungia

Personal details
- Born: August 19, 1949; Kinston, North Carolina, U.S.
- Died: March 28, 2025 (aged 75); California, U.S.
- Education: Duke University (BA); University of North Carolina, Chapel Hill (JD)

Susan Owens (August 19, 1949 – March 28, 2025) was an American lawyer who served as an associate justice of the Washington Supreme Court from 2001 to 2024. On November 7, 2000, she was elected the seventh woman to serve on the court. She joined the court after serving nineteen years as district court judge in Western Clallam County, where she was the county's senior elected official with five terms. She also served as the Quileute Tribe's chief judge for five years and chief judge of the Lower Elwha Klallam Tribe for more than six years.

== Life and career ==
Owens was born on August 19, 1949 in Kinston, North Carolina, where she was raised and graduated from high school. Her father, Frank Owens, was a small town general practitioner, and her mother, Hazel is a retired law enforcement officer. She attended college at Duke University. After graduation in 1971, she attended law school at the University of North Carolina at Chapel Hill, receiving her Juris Doctor in 1975. She was admitted to the Oregon State Bar in 1975, and the Washington State Bar in 1976.

Owens died in California on March 28, 2025, at the age of 75.

== Notable opinions ==
Owens signed the majority opinions sanctioning the delegations of very broad policy-setting powers to appointive-board governments.

In September 2017, Owens wrote for the majority when, by a vote of 6–3, it upheld the child pornography trafficking conviction of a seventeen-year-old boy for sexting a picture of himself to an adult woman.

In October 2018, Owens concurred when the majority abolished the state's death penalty because they found its racist imposition violated the Constitution of Washington.

Legal offices
Preceded by Phil Talmadge	Associate Justice of the Washington Supreme Court; 2001–2024	Succeeded by Sal Mungia
