= Sal Mungia =

American lawyer (born 1958 or 1959)

Associate Justice of the Washington Supreme Court
- Incumbent
- Assumed office January 15, 2025
- Preceded by: Susan Owens

Personal details
- Born: Salvador Alejo Mungia II; February 19, 1959 (age 66) Lakewood, Washington, U.S.
- Education: Pacific Lutheran University (BA); Georgetown University (JD)

Salvador Alejo Mungia II (born February 19, 1959) is an American lawyer who has served as a justice of the Washington Supreme Court since 2025.

== Early life and education ==
Mungia was born in Lakewood, Washington. He graduated from Clover Park High School in 1977 he attended Pacific Lutheran University, graduating in 1981. He graduated from Georgetown University Law Center in 1984.

== Career ==
After graduating law school, Mungia clerked for Washington Supreme Court Justice Fred H. Dore and then U.S. District Court Judge Carolyn Dimmick. In 1986, he joined Gordon Thomas Honeywell in Tacoma where he specialized in civil trial and appellate law, including medical malpractice, injury, and business law. He has argued appeals to the U.S. Supreme Court.

Mungia worked with a group of lawyers who proposed a judicial rule to help stop racial discrimination in jury selection, which the Washington Supreme Court adopted in 2018. He has worked with the American Civil Liberties Union, providing pro bono work to incarcerated individuals and tenants in disputes with their landlords.

=== Washington Supreme Court ===
In 2024, Justice Susan Owens retired from the Supreme Court due to the state constitution that requires justices to retire at the end of the year they turn 75. It was the first State Supreme court election in 12 years without an incumbent running for reelection. In the primary election, Mungia came in first among four candidates, with 43.43%, and Federal Way Municipal Court judge Dave Larson came in second, with 36.45%.

Although a nonpartisan election, Mungia was endorsed by Democrats, while Larson was endorsed by the State Republican party. He outraised Larson, $525,000 to $175,000, with most of Mungia's donations coming from democratic or progressive sources. Mungia won the general election, winning by a close margin, 50.05% to 49.44%.

== Personal life ==
Mungia is a child of immigrant parents; his father is from Mexico, and his mother is from Japan. He is single and has three adult children, one child in school and one grandchild.

== Electoral history ==
SUPREME COURT - Justice Position #02
Party	Candidate	Votes	%
Non partisan	Sal Mungia	1,644,253	50.05
Non partisan	Dave Larson	1,624,309	49.44
Write-in		16,654	0.51
Total votes		3,285,216	100.00

Legal offices
Preceded by Susan Owens	Associate Justice of the Washington Supreme Court; 2025–present	Incumbent
