= City Center Bellevue =

Office skyscraper in Bellevue, Washington

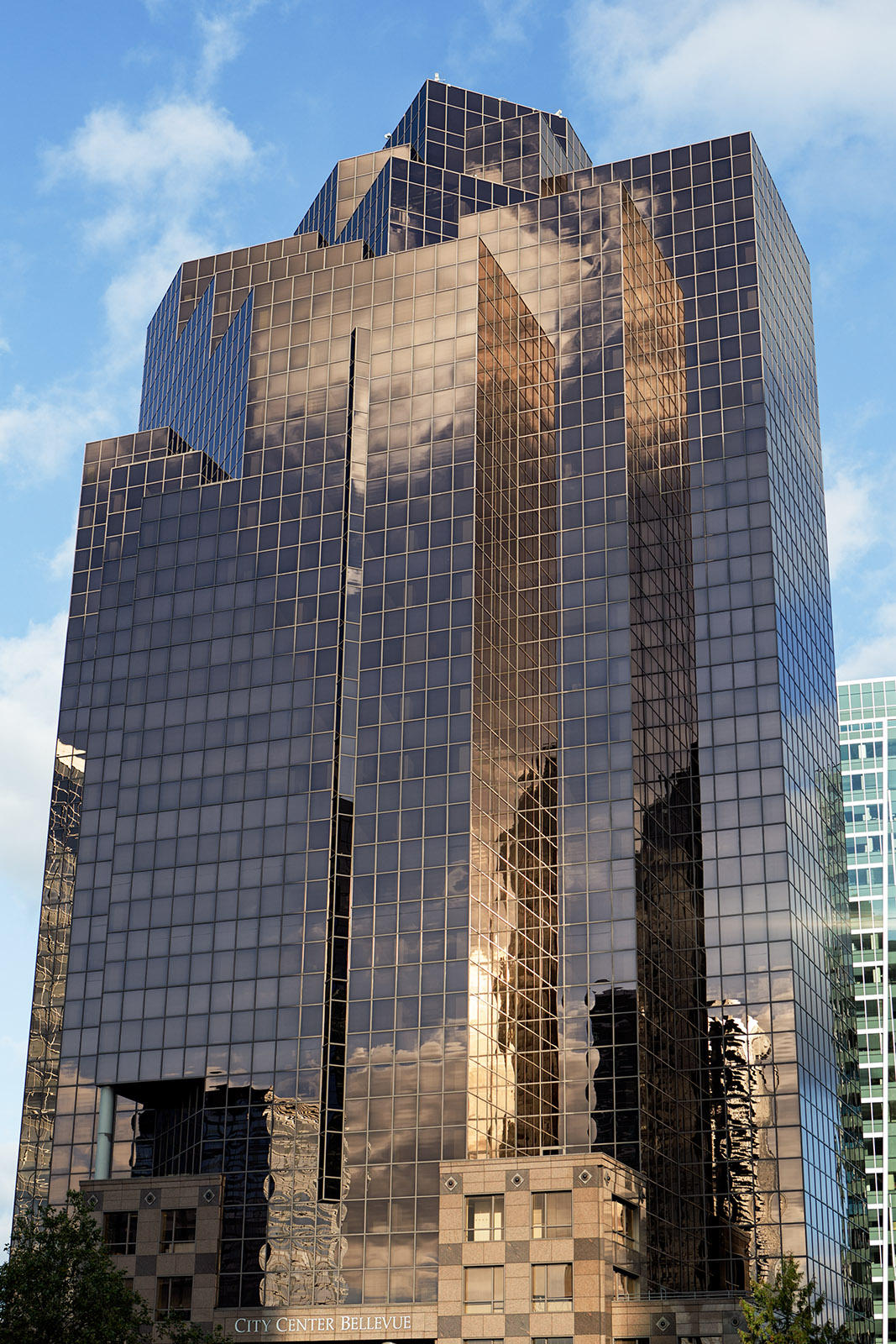

- Location within Washington (state)

General information
- Architectural style: Modernist
- Location: 500 108th Ave NE; Bellevue, Washington, United States
- Coordinates: 47°36′55″N 122°11′45″W
- Elevation: 50 m (164 ft)
- Current tenants: First Tech Credit Union, Sterling Savings Bank, Starbucks (retail); Cisco, Esterline, inome, Sucker Punch Productions
- Inaugurated: 1986
- Client: Koll Company
- Owner: American Assets Trust

Height
- Height: 358 ft (109 m)

Technical details
- Floor count: 27
- Floor area: 495,949 sq ft (46,075.2 m^{2})

Design and construction
- Architect: Callison Architecture

Other information
- Parking: 703 stalls

Website
- citycenterbellevue.com

City Center Bellevue is a 358-foot (109 m) tall, 27-story high-rise office skyscraper in Bellevue, Washington, completed in 1986. It was the tallest building in Bellevue until 2005.

City Center Plaza, also in downtown Bellevue, is a separate 26 story building completed a decade later.

Records
Preceded by Skyline Tower	Tallest building in Bellevue, Washington; 1986–2005	Succeeded by One Lincoln Tower
