= Nancy Buffington =

American politician (1939–2021)

Member of the Washington Senate from the 34th district
- In office 1975–1979

Personal details
- Born: March 24, 1939 Logan, Utah, U.S.
- Died: April 15, 2021 (aged 82) Seattle, Washington, U.S.
- Party: Republican
- Education: University of Washington

Nancy Catherine R. Buffington (March 24, 1939 – April 15, 2021) was an American politician. She was a Republican, representing District 34 in the Washington State Senate which included parts of King County, from 1975 to 1979. Born in Utah, she converted from Mormonism to Catholicism when she moved to Seattle. She authored and published "Critical Choices" in 1990 about supporting a loved one through a liver transplant and wrote her autobiography in 2012.
