= Bellevue Square =

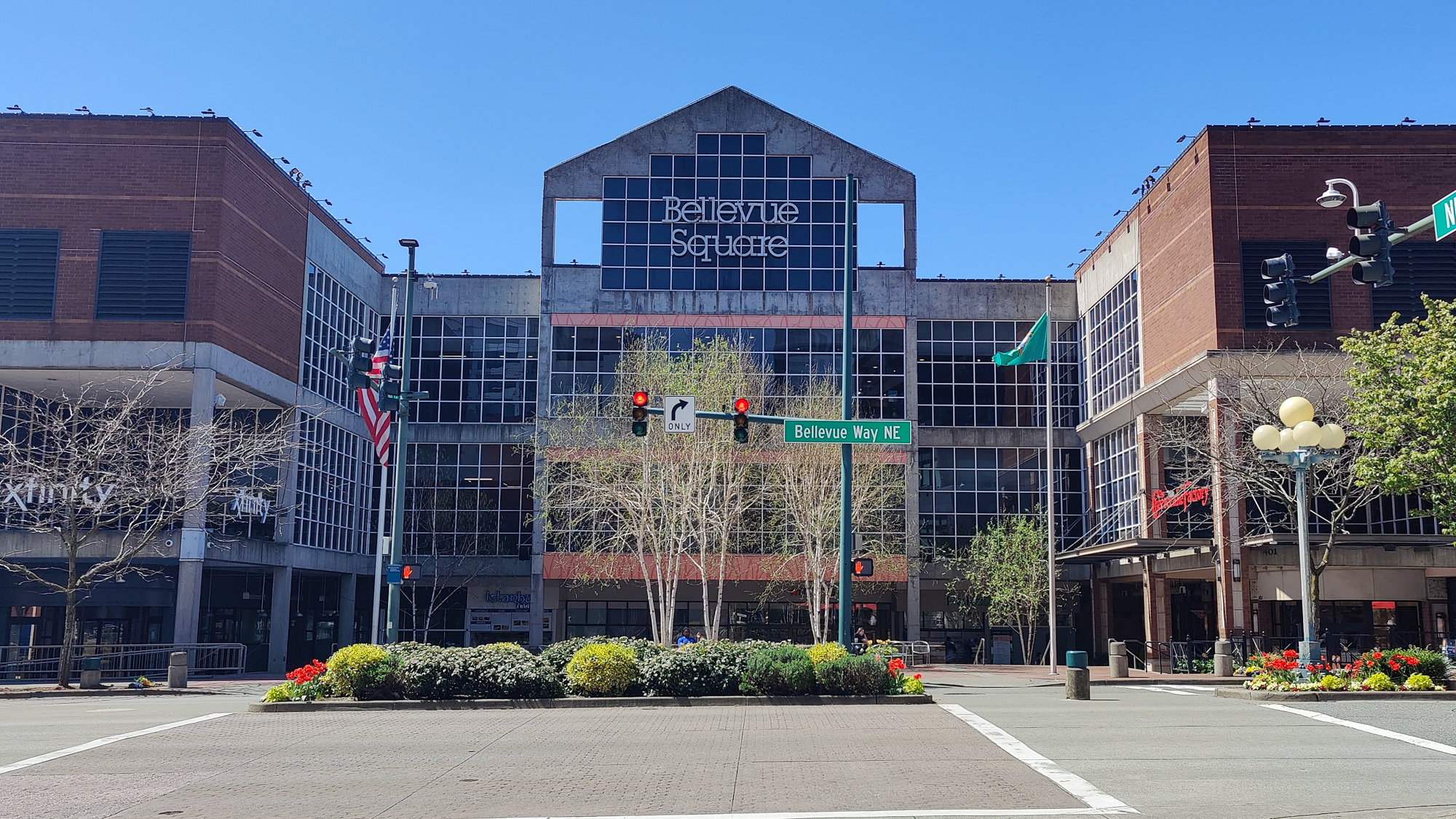
- East entrance on Bellevue Way
- Location: Bellevue, Washington, U.S.
- Coordinates: 47.61555°N 122.20392°W
- Opened: August 20, 1946; 80 years ago
- Developer: Kemper Freeman Sr
- Manager: Kemper Development Company
- Owner: Kemper Development Company
- Num. of stores: over 200
- Num. of anchor tenants: 2
- Floor area: 1,300,000 sq ft (120,000 m^{2}) (GLA)
- Floors: 3
- Website: bellevuecollection.com

Bellevue Square is a shopping center in Bellevue, Washington, United States. The mall has over 200 retail stores with anchors Macy's and Nordstrom. Bellevue Square also offers concierge services, valet parking, and a children's play area. It and the connecting Lincoln Square comprise The Bellevue Collection.

Bellevue Square attracts over 23 million visitors annually (as of 2014) and had sales of over $1,000 per square foot in 2016.

Bellevue Square is among the minority of class A malls that are privately held and not owned by a public Real Estate Investment Trust.

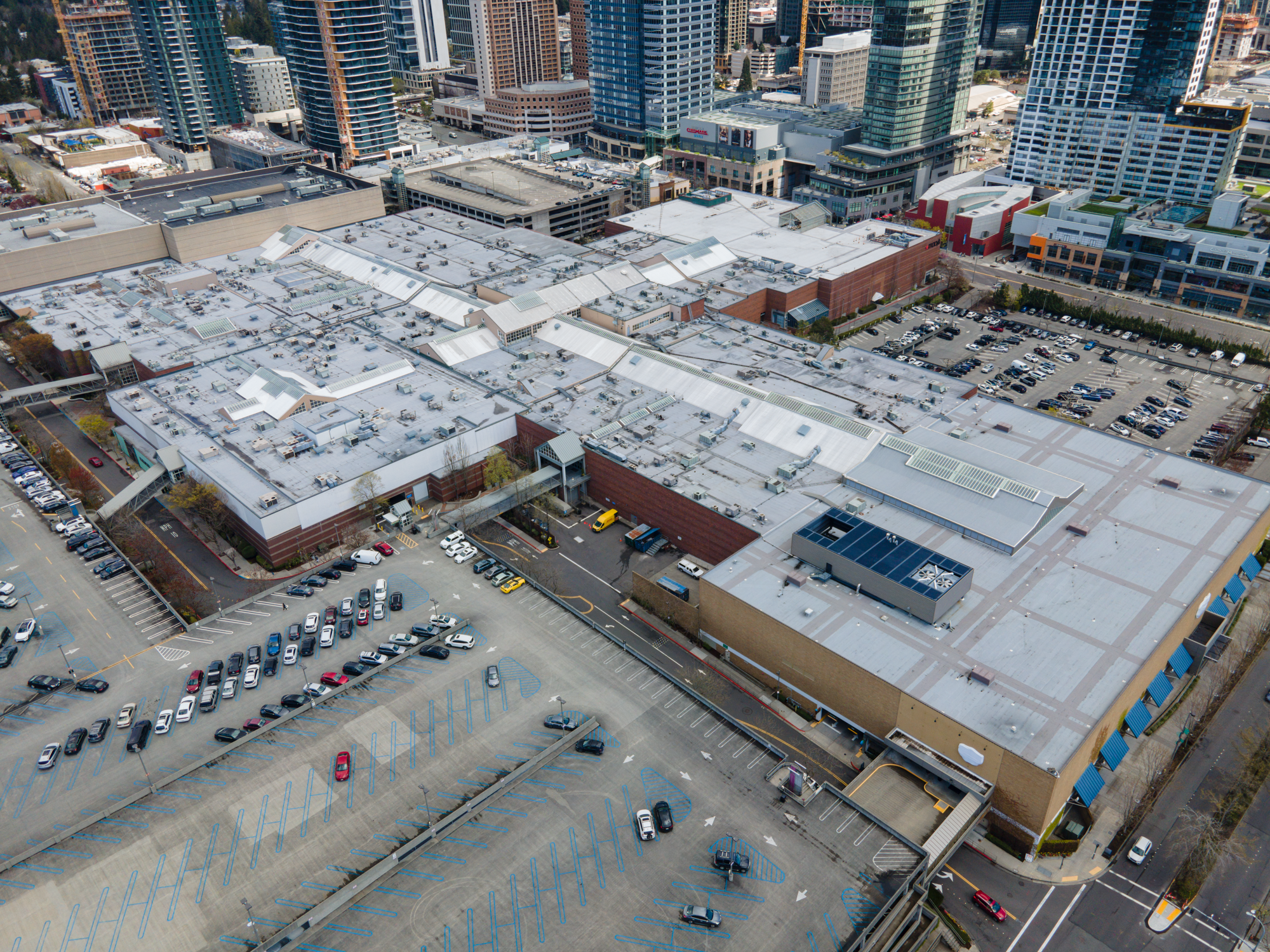
Aerial view of Bellevue Square

== History ==
Bellevue Square was first opened on August 20, 1946, trading under the name "Bellevue Shopping Square", with the first suburban department store opened by Marshall Field & Co. through its Seattle-based subsidiary, Frederick & Nelson.

With the mall's name shortened to Bellevue Square a few years later, JCPenney opened a store in 1955. Nordstrom, then a local shoe store, opened in 1958, before adding apparel and becoming the third major anchor in 1966, initially under the name Nordstrom Best.

In the 1980s, the mall, then led by the original developer's son, Kemper Freeman Jr., expanded in several phases, finally adding a location for the Seattle-based department store The Bon Marché in 1984. In 1992, with the bankruptcy and closure of Frederick & Nelson and collapse of a deal to lease part of the vacated space to Saks Fifth Avenue, the center used the opportunity to reconfigure the vacant anchor as mall shop space. 1994 saw the addition of a separate The Bon Marché Home Store, while Nordstrom expanded the size of their store by half. In 2003, The Bon Marché stores were renamed Bon-Macy's, and in 2005 they adopted the name Macy's.

In 2007, Bellevue Square was linked by a skybridge to Lincoln Square, another Kemper Freeman owned property which opened in 2005 and expanded in 2017. Together, they form part of the "Bellevue Collection", which spans several blocks of Downtown Bellevue.

In September 2014, JCPenney announced that it was closing its store after staying in the mall for 55 years. The 200,000 square foot area was converted into smaller retail stores in May 2015 for the following holiday season including UNIQLO and Zara.

On May 31, 2020, much of the interior of Bellevue Square (which had been closed for two months in response to the COVID-19 pandemic) was damaged by looters in a downtown riot. Police alleged it was staged by organized gang members amid the George Floyd protests that had begun in the area. The mall was later secured by Bellevue Police and the Washington National Guard.
