= John D. Jones (Washington politician) =

American politician

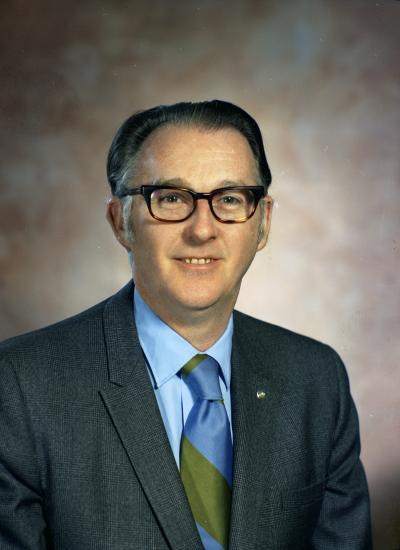
- Jones in 1971

Member of the Washington House of Representatives for the 48th district
- In office 1970–1973

Member of the Washington State Senate for the 48th district
- In office 1973–1983

Personal details
- Born: June 26, 1923 Blaenau Ffestiniog, Wales
- Died: October 7, 2014 (aged 91) Fayetteville, Arkansas, U.S.
- Party: Republican
- Spouse: Ruth
- Occupation: manager

John David Jones (June 26, 1923 – October 7, 2014) was a Welsh-American politician in the state of Washington. He served in the Washington House of Representatives and Washington State Senate as a Republican.
