= Lincoln Square (Bellevue) =

Mixed-use urban development in Bellevue, Washington, U.S.

- Location: Bellevue, Washington
- Coordinates: 47.617002°N 122.201169°W
- Status: Completed
- Constructed: 2001–2005 (Phase I); 2014–2017 (Phase II)
- Opening: November 1, 2005 (Phase I); December 2016 (Phase II)
- Use: Mixed-use (Retail, Office, Housing, Hotel)

Companies
- Developer: Kemper Freeman
- Owner: Kemper Development Company

Technical details
- Cost: $360 million (Phase I) $1.2 billion (Phase II)

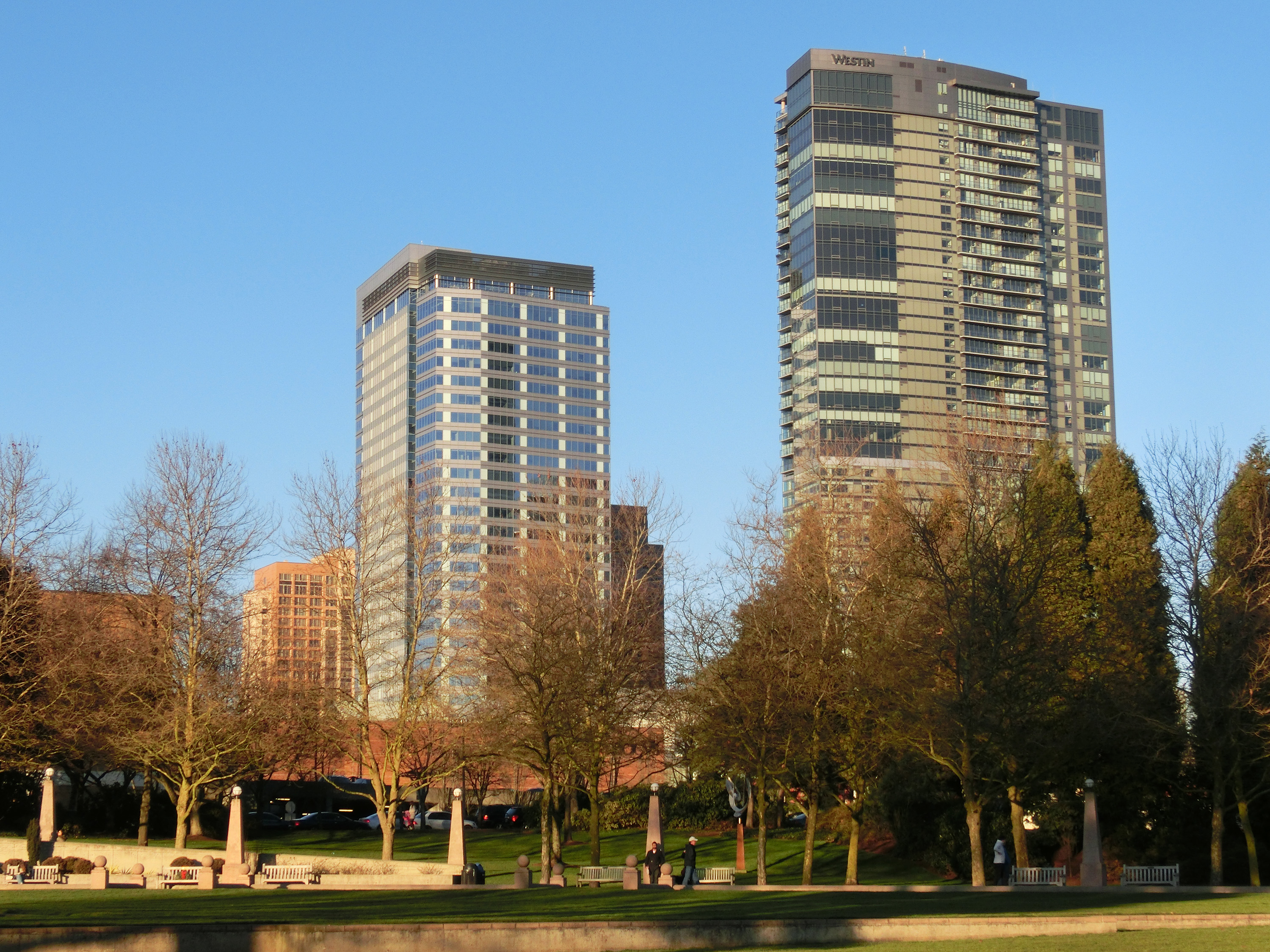
Bellevue Westin

Lincoln Square is a mixed-use urban development in Bellevue, Washington, owned by prominent local developer Kemper Freeman. Lincoln Square, located along Bellevue Way between NE 6th and NE 8th streets, consists of two skyscrapers with retail and restaurant space, and a movie theater; and a 148-room residential tower and 337-room luxury hotel (One Lincoln Tower); and underground parking. The development constitutes part of "The Bellevue Collection", which consists of Freeman's properties in downtown Bellevue alongside Bellevue Place and Bellevue Square. The office tower is leased to Eddie Bauer's corporate headquarters; the hotel is occupied by Westin Hotels & Resorts.

The project was originally conceived in the late 1990s by Westbank Projects, a Canadian firm, and Lendlease of Australia. The 27-story office building was to be occupied by Drugstore.com while a separate 42-story building would have a Westin hotel and condominiums. Following the dot-com bubble, Drugstore.com backed out of its lease agreement and other tenants were unable to commit to their previous terms. Opus Northwest won an auction for the project rights, but later sold their stake to Kemper Freeman in 2003 for $40 million. The first phase was completed in November 2005 with Eddie Bauer and Microsoft as office tenants.

A $1.2 billion expansion, consisting of two mixed-use towers, was announced in 2013 and began construction in 2014; the project, known as Lincoln Square South, was completed in January 2017 alongside an expansion of the Bellevue Square mall. Video game developer and distributor Valve moved their headquarters to Lincoln Square in 2016, replacing another Bellevue building. In 2023, Microsoft declined to renew their 20-floor lease in the north tower and vacated most of its offices, with the exception of two floors for subsidiary LinkedIn.

== Tenants ==
- Coldwell Banker Bain
- Eddie Bauer
- Merrill Lynch
- Ballmer Group
- Stifel Financial
- The Pokémon Company International
- Unity
- Valve
- Westin Hotels & Resorts

== Gallery ==
A fountain at the entrance of Lincoln Square.

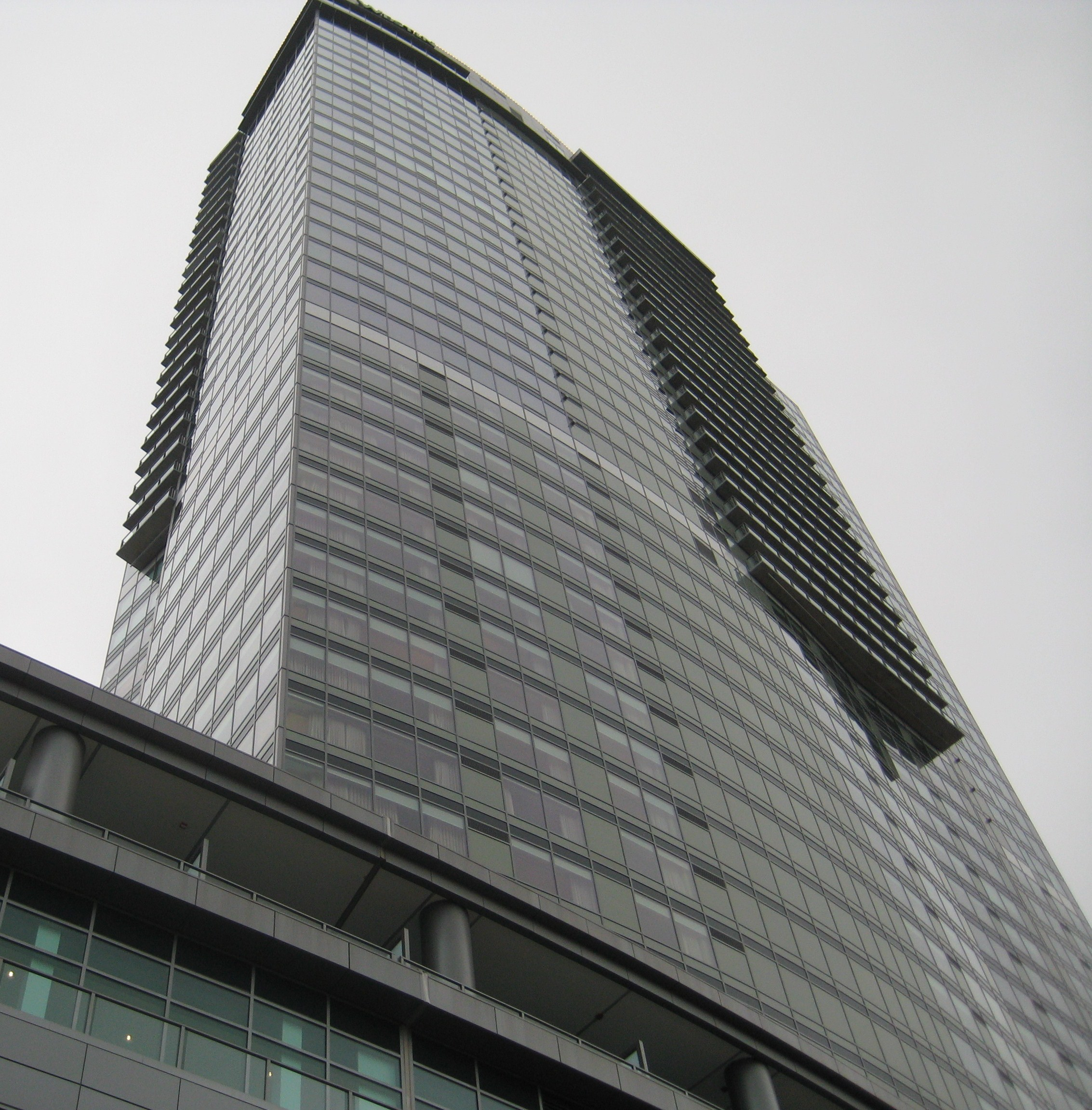
The Westin hotel occupies One Lincoln Tower, the southern tower of Lincoln Square.
