= Molecule Man (disambiguation) =

Molecule Man may refer to

- Molecule Man, a Marvel Comics character
- Molecule Man (sculpture), a sculpture by Jonathan Borofsky
- Molecule Man (video game), a computer game released by Mastertronic in 1986
