= Ballerina Clown =

Public sculpture in California

- The sculpture in 2012
- Artist: Jonathan Borofsky
- Year: 1989
- Medium: Aluminum, steel, wire mesh, fiberglass
- Movement: Pop art
- Dimensions: 30 ft (9.1 m) tall
- 33.9962°N 118.4779°W

Ballerina Clown, also known as Clownerina, is a public sculpture in the Venice neighborhood of Los Angeles. It was unveiled in 1989 and was created by Jonathan Borofsky. The sculpture is animated, occasionally kicking during a scheduled time in the afternoon. It is located on top of a CVS Pharmacy at the corner of Rose Ave. and Main St.

== History ==
Housing developer Harlan Lee commissioned the sculpture for $300,000 in 1989. It was originally exhibited at the Museum of Contemporary Art, Los Angeles as a 12 ft (3.7 m) display in a gallery. Instead of its legs moving, it sang a cover of "My Way" by Frank Sinatra. When the actual, full-size sculpture was complete, tenants of the building it stood on complained of the noise its knee made. Because of this, the legs stopped kicking. Lee sold the building in 1990, and the building's housing association currently owns the sculpture. Its legs began to move again in May 2014 but stopped temporarily as replacement parts were needed. The sculpture resumed its kicking at the Venice Art Walk.

== Description ==
Jonathan Borofsky, the creator of the sculpture, wanted to symbolize the character of Venice, Los Angeles, saying:

"Of course, the Venice Boardwalk is full of all kinds of people in all sorts of outfits and the atmosphere is very festive with many live street performances taking place, especially on weekends. This sculpture is an accommodation or resolution of opposites in one. Not only does this image bring the male and female together into one figure, but also, two opposite types of performers are represented: the formal classical ballet dancer and the traditional street performer. Of course, this public sculpture pushes the envelope in "taste", but if you have ever walked the Venice Boardwalk on a Sunday afternoon, you might understand why this figure is right at home."

Power is supplied by the soapbox the clown is standing on. The sculpture is made out of aluminum, steel, wire mesh, and fiberglass.

== Reception ==
Christopher Knight of the Los Angeles Times compared the sculpture to works of Pablo Picasso and Georges Seurat.
