= Main Street =

Primary road of a human settlement

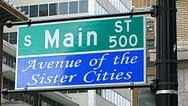
Sign for South Main Street, Tulsa, Oklahoma

Main Street is a metonym used to denote a primary retail street of a village, town or small city in many parts of the world. It is usually a focal point for shops and retailers in the central business district, and is most often used in reference to retailing, socializing, and the place to go to find "common" concerns.

The term is commonly used in Ireland, Scotland, the United States, and Canada, and less often in Australia and New Zealand. In the non-Scottish regions of the United Kingdom, the common description is High Street, though "Fore Street" or "Front Street" is commonplace in some parts. In Jamaica the term is Front Street. In the 1950s awareness about the 'main street' as a concept of its own importance emerged in the urban studies field, attaining the attention in the theoretical discussions of postmodern urban design, neo-traditional planning and meta-urbanism.

In many places, the street name for such a street is actually "Main Street", though even where it is not the actual name, "main street" is still used to describe the main thoroughfare of the central business district. The "Main Street of America" branding was used to promote U.S. Route 66 in its heyday.

== American cultural usage ==
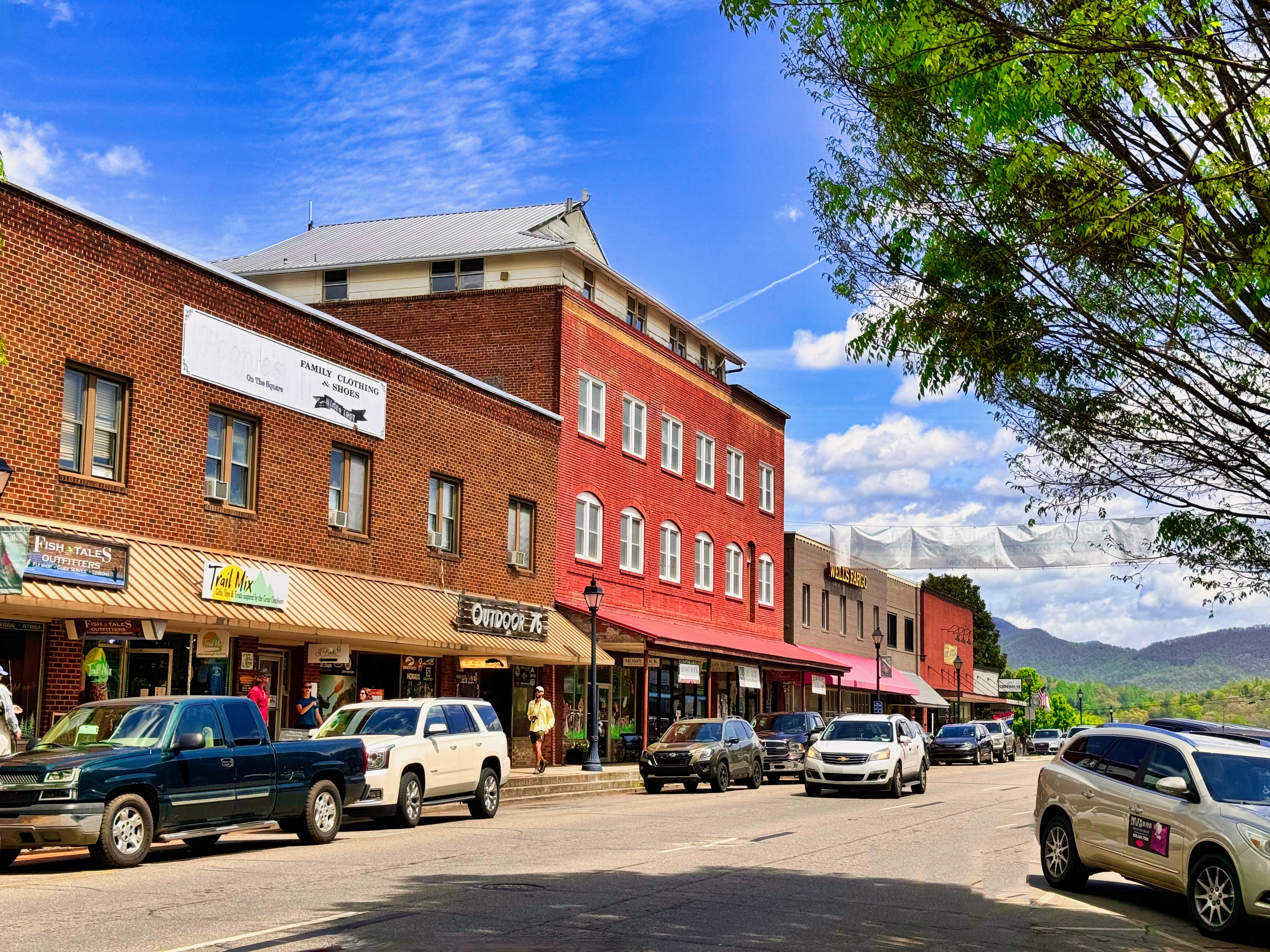
A revitalized Main Street in Franklin, North Carolina

In the general sense, the term "Main Street" refers to a place of small-town traditional values, usually in contrast to big-city modernity. Social realists from 1870 to 1930 used the name as a symbol of stifling conformity. Sherwood Anderson, for example, wrote Winesburg, Ohio: A Group of Tales of Ohio Small Town Life in 1919. The best-selling 1920 novel Main Street was a critique of small-town life by the American writer Sinclair Lewis. The locale was "Gopher Prairie," presented as an 'ideal type' of the Midwestern town, and the heroine, Carol Kennicott, was a more urbane, 'ideal-typical' Progressive.

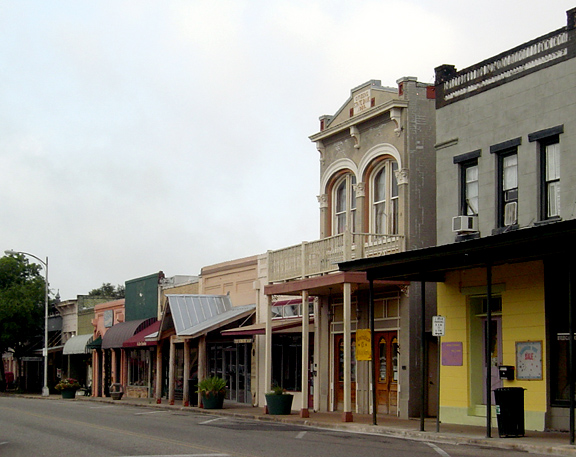
A traditional Main Street; Bastrop, Texas, featuring the small shops and old-fashioned architecture typical of rural towns

In North American media of later decades, "Main Street" represents the interests of everyday people and small business owners, in contrast with "Wall Street" (in the United States) or "Bay Street" (in Canada), symbolizing the interests of large national corporations. Thus, in the 1949 movie adaptation of On The Town, the song "When You Walk Down Main Street With Me" refers to small-town values and social life. Main Street Republicans, for example, see themselves as supporting those values as against urbane or "Wall Street" tendencies.

"Main Street" is part of the iconography of American life. For example, the Army and Air Force Exchange Service, the outfit that operates the PX and BX stores on military bases, chose the name "Main Street USA" for its food courts.

Main Street was a popular term during the economic crises in 2008 and 2009: the proposed bailout of U.S. financial system, the 2008 US presidential campaign, and debates. One widely reviewed book was Bailout: An Inside Account of How Washington Abandoned Main Street While Rescuing Wall Street (2012) by Neil Barofsky.

In small towns across the United States, Main Street is not only the major road running through town but the site of all street life, a place where townspeople hang out and watch the annual parades go by. A slang term popularized in the early 20th century, "main drag", is also used to refer to a town's main street.

=== Walt Disney ===
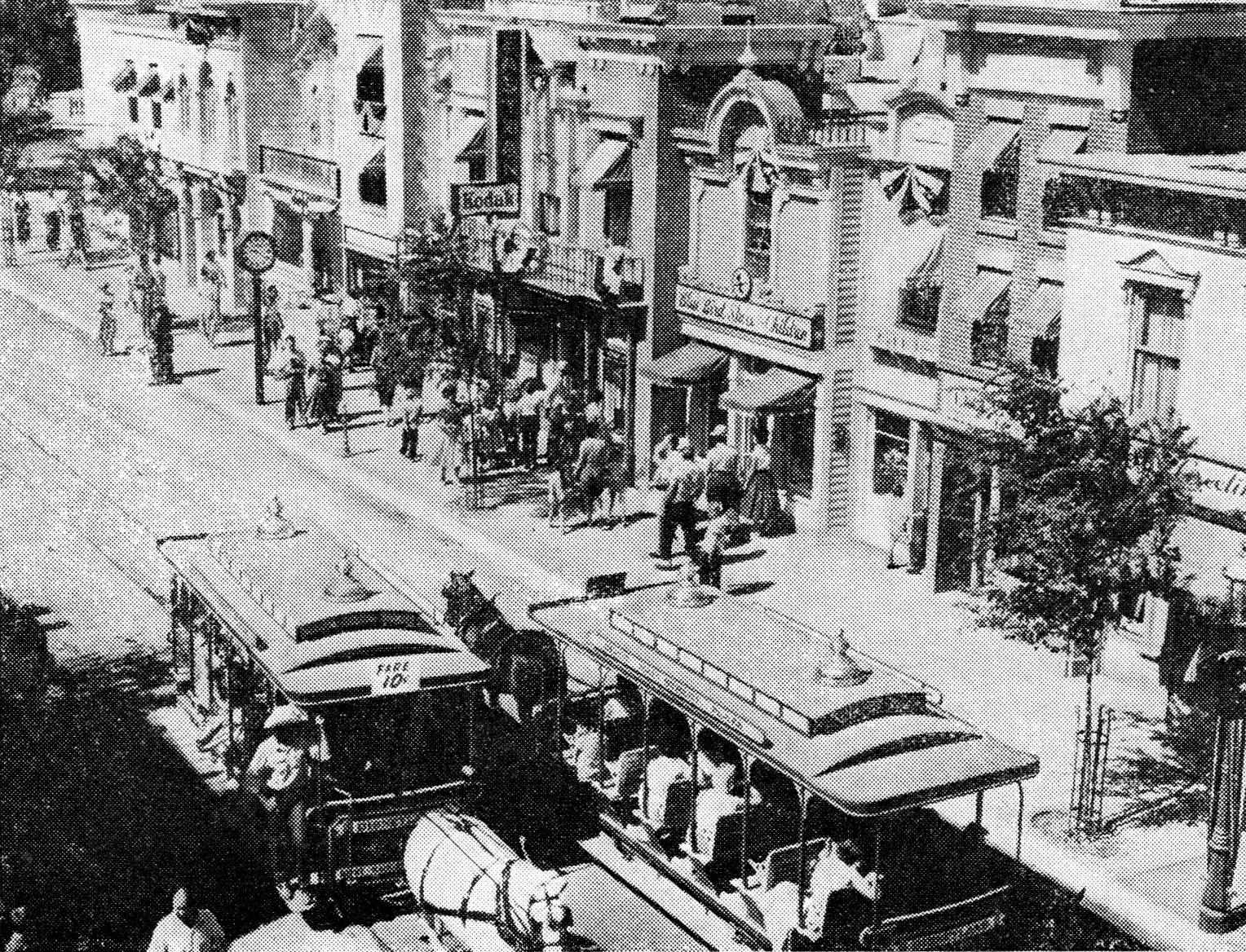
Main Street, U.S.A. at Disneyland in 1957

Two Walt Disney Company theme parks, Disneyland in Anaheim, California, and the Magic Kingdom in the Walt Disney World Resort near Orlando, Florida, both have "Main Street, U.S.A." sections immediately at their front. These areas, which are designed to look like the main street of a small town, house gift shops, restaurants and various services, along with park offices on the second floors. While the architecture of these "streets" appears to be turn-of-the-20th-century, in fact these are decorative false-fronts on industrial-style buildings. Main Street, U.S.A. is also present at Disneyland Paris and Hong Kong Disneyland. At Tokyo Disneyland the area is named "World Bazaar," but has the same look as Main Street, albeit housed under a decorative glass roof for protection from Japan's unpredictable weather. At Shanghai Disneyland, the area is named "Mickey Ave," but also has the same style as Main Street.

Disney's design copied visual elements of small-town America seen in films by Frank Capra and others, in a deliberate attempt to capture the iconic symbolism of small-town America. Disney wanted to embed the values and memories associated with life in small towns into an entertainment experience for tourists.

=== Preservation and Main Street ===
Main Street America is a community revitalization program begun by the National Trust for Historic Preservation in the late 1970s. The core of the Main Street Approach is the revitalization of commercial districts via economic development and historic preservation. The Main Street Approach is a holistic approach to downtown and neighborhood commercial district revitalization based on the 4-point approach of design, promotion, economic vitality, and organization. Originally targeted at small, traditional downtowns, the program has expanded to include towns of various sizes, including neighborhood districts in several large urban centers.

In many communities, a merchants' association or business improvement district serves a promotional role on behalf of the merchants of a downtown Main Street. Individual city governments also may engage in revitalization or historic preservation efforts to support a downtown core, either to make a community appear more attractive for tourism or to stem a flow of commerce out of the city into suburbs with shopping malls and cookie-cutter big box stores.

In the United States federal funds are allocated specifically for restoration of historic properties on the former U.S. Route 66, the main street of many roadside towns; this funding is administered by the US National Park Service.

== International use and equivalents ==
- Many small Canadian cities and towns have a thoroughfare named Main Street (or, in French, Rue principale); in other cases, the main street of the community has a name particular to that community. The phrase "a town where the main street is still called Main Street" is occasionally used as being synonymous with small-town values.
  - In Ottawa, main streets of various individual villages which had been annexed to the larger urban municipality bear names like "Manotick Main" or "Osgoode Main" to distinguish them from Smyth Road (which becomes "Main Street" in one small area southeast of downtown Ottawa) and from each other. The main street of centretown Ottawa is Bank Street.
  - In Toronto, Main Street is a mostly residential avenue in the East York district. At one time it was the main street of the hamlet of East Toronto, which was annexed by the city of Toronto in 1908. It has kept its historic name, and evidence of its commercial origins can be seen in the stores at the corner of Main and Gerrard Streets. Toronto's main street is considered to be Yonge Street, which divides the city's latitudinal streets into east–west.
  - Saint Laurent Boulevard, which divides Montreal between east and west, is unofficially known as "the Main."
  - Main Street in Vancouver is a neighbourhood shopping street, near the dividing line between east and west side of town. However, the city's main city centre shopping street is Robson Street.
- In Australia and New Zealand, smaller urban centres often have a main street. In some towns this street is officially designated Main Street or High Street; rarer variants include Main Road, Commercial Road, and Commerce Street. Often, though, the street is given a name peculiar to the town. For many small towns, the main street forms part of the principal road into, or through, the town. Large centres often have a central business district in which no one street is a clear focus for commercial activity, though for historical or cultural reasons there is often one street regarded as the city's "main street." Examples include Melbourne's Collins Street, Sydney's George Street, Adelaide's King William Street, Auckland's Queen Street, and Christchurch's Colombo Street.
- In Ireland most towns have a "main street," and this is usually the term given colloquially (for example, in offering road directions), though the primary thoroughfare of cities are often named after a historical figure, e.g. O'Connell Street. A more recent phenomenon in the media and with younger people is the use of the term "high street" to describe typical or average street level fashion—likely due to advertising by various British retail multiples which began operating in Ireland during the "Celtic Tiger" years.
- In the United Kingdom, the terms "Market Street" or "Market Place" are often used to designate the heart of a town or city, as is the more common "High Street" (with limited exception in Scotland where the term "Main Street" is used to describe the equivalent in smaller towns, and particularly in newer urban developments, or towns or cities across the whole of Britain which were not original market towns). High Street is often the name of a fairly busy street with small shops on either side, often in towns and villages.
- In the Netherlands the Hoofdstraat is mostly one of the oldest streets in villages and towns. It's located in the old center and varying from very small pedestrian-only streets to wide four-lane roads.

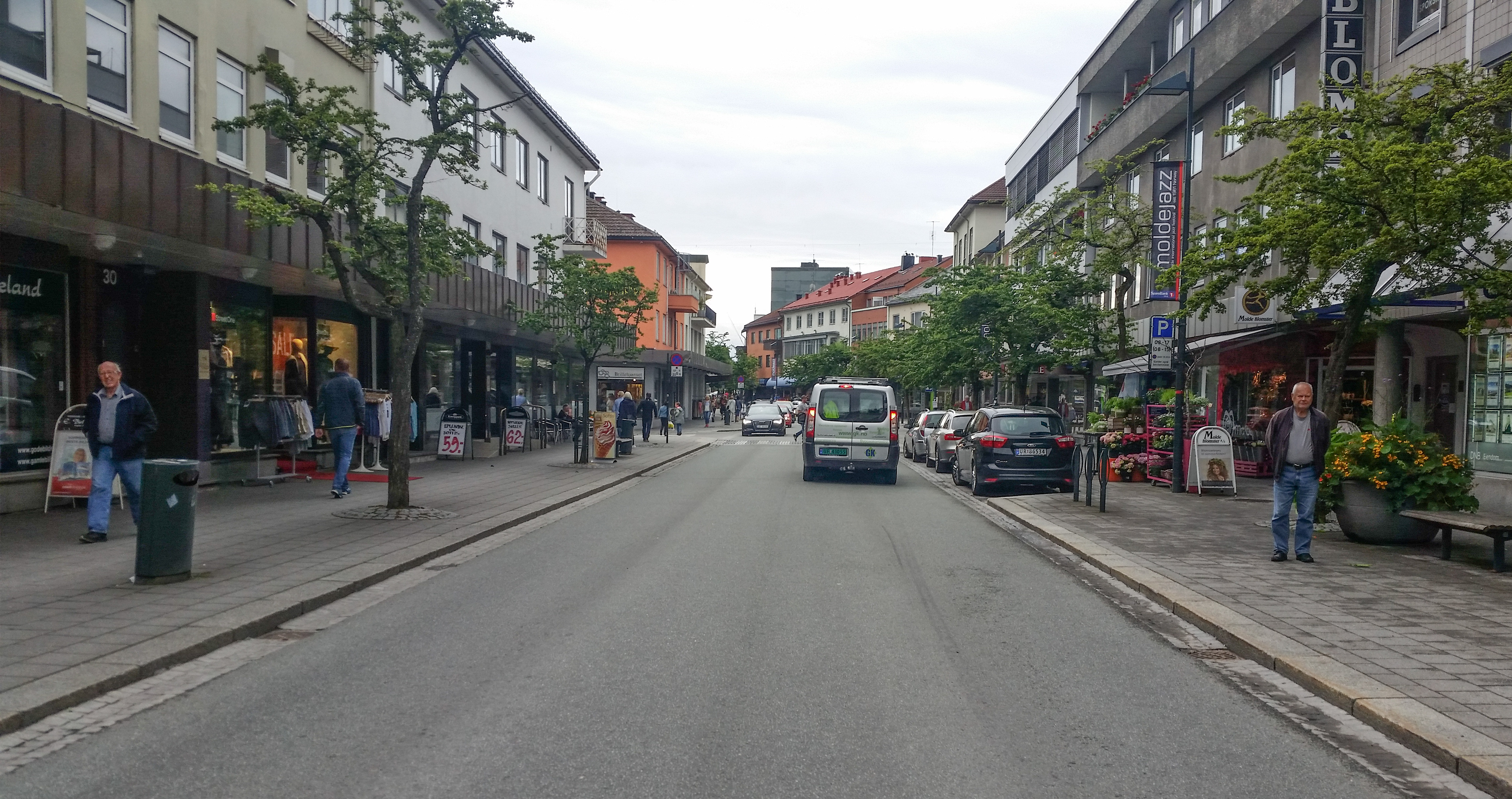
Storgata in the small Norwegian town of Molde.

- In Sweden and Norway, almost all towns and cities have their own main street, called Storgatan/Storgaten (literally, "The big street"). They are typically surrounded by stores and restaurants, and increasingly since the late 20th century, open for pedestrians only. A pedestrian street is called gågata/gågate (literally, "walkingstreet").
- In Germany, the Hauptstraße (literally "Main Street") is a highly trafficked street. Hauptstraßen even have formal recognition in road construction guidelines, which specify the width of lanes, for example. The term chiefly refers to motorized traffic, whereas Einkaufsstraße (shopping street) or Fußgängerzone (pedestrian district) correspond better to the retail sense of a main street.

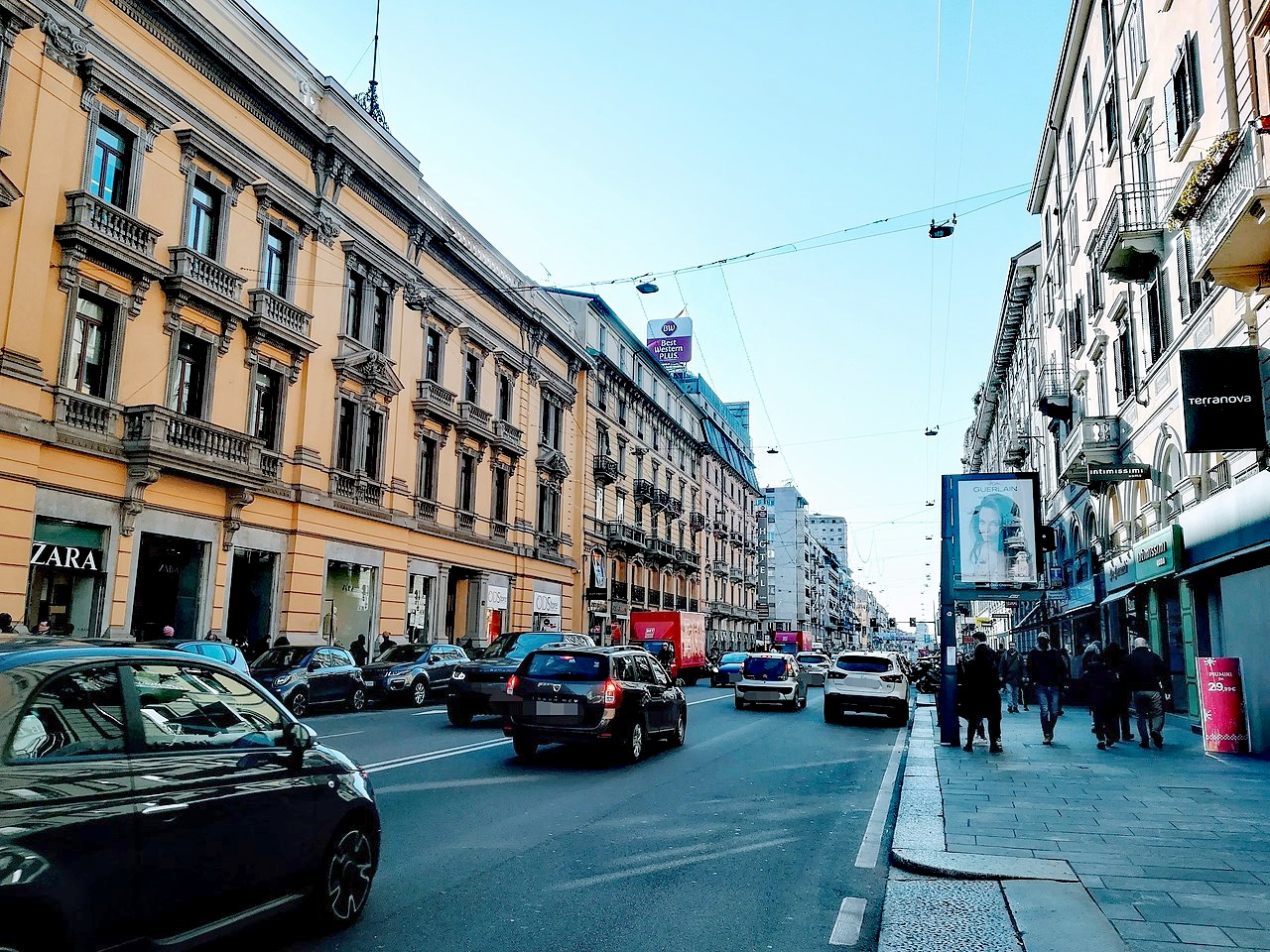
Corso Buenos Aires in Milan, Italy

- In most Italian municipalities, the highway or another major route is called corso. There is no univocal definition of corso, even if it is generally applied only to municipal streets characterized by ancient traditions or a certain importance in the building physiognomy of the municipality.
- Jalan Besar ("Large Road" in Malay) is a common name used in Malaysia (and to a lesser extent, Singapore) for the main streets of older urban centres in the country. Such main streets were originally constructed during British colonisation of territories in present-day Malaysia and Singapore, and were named in English as "Main Street" or "Main Road," depending on the size and nature of the urban centre, and often are laid out as parts of major thoroughfares between larger towns and cities.
  - The independence of states that would form Malaysia and the introduction of Malay as the national language in 1967 led to extensive renaming of certain Main Streets or Main Roads to Jalan Besar in Malaysia the following decades. Large cities (such as state capitals) tend to forgo the use of "Main Street" or "Main Road" altogether, as commercial or transport activity may be concentrated along more than one street.
- In South Africa, Main Road is the term used for the same concept as Main Street in the U.S. and High Street in the UK.
- In Cambodia, the Main Road is between the rice fields and settlements.
- In industrial engineering, "Main Street" is often used to describe a conveyor which transports the fundamental materials for producing objects to the automated construction site where the intended object will be assembled.

=== Main Street in Ireland ===
Main Street is the place/road name used in many suburbs, towns, and villages in Ireland. For example, the OSI North Leinster Town Maps book lists sixteen Main Streets and only two High Streets in its thirty-town index of street names. Similarly, the OSI Dublin Street Guide, which covers all of Dublin City and County Dublin, lists twenty Main Streets and only two High Streets. Killarney and Galway are two of the few Irish towns in which the term High Street is used instead of Main Street. Recent and upcoming tranches of funding for Local Authority-led projects seek to help regenerate Main Streets, and town and city centres around Ireland under the URDF (Urban Regeneration Development Fund) and RRDF (Rural Regeneration Development Fund).

There were also earlier, 1990s to early 2000s, tax-incentive based initiatives, for private interests, for the refurbishments of buildings, and 'Living over the Shop' (LOTS) schemes, based along specified lengths of urban streets, under Village and Urban Renewal Schemes and that overall, sought the regeneration of main street Ireland. Some of these schemes may have suffered from sufficient lack of interest or impact due to for example, business owners insurance and security issues regarding separate occupiers above for LOTS projects, and general lack of finance and familiarity with residential projects and landlordism, and depressed interest of the general public in returning to town and village centre living in the modern era. These efforts specifically included the 'Town and Village Renewal Schemes' (financial grants of up to €100,000) and previous Town Renewal Scheme, 1999 and Urban Renewal Scheme.

There is also a recent pilot project(s) of funding for town centre improvements in (six) different rural Irish towns dispersed around the country, and for example, noting including various town/village rejuvenation projects in County Monaghan.

The Town Renewal scheme, for example, was a 10-year tax relief incentive scheme for renovations or new builds that was to improve the 'Townscape' and 'Streetscape' of smaller Irish towns, through the physical improvements of buildings e.g. views building façades on 'main streets'.

The efforts of local governments (county councils, city councils, and the former town councils, until 2017) to improve 'main streets' centered around their Planning Departments and County Development Plans. These included shopfront design guides such as the "Shopfront Design Guide, 2001" and "Shopfront Design Guidelines for the O'Connell Street Area, 2003" of Dublin City Council, and the "Guide to Good Shopfronts." There are also for further examples; the "Guidelines for Shopfront Design in Bray, 2007" (and its earlier, shorter iteration of c.2000) of Bray Town Council, and the 2014 "Shopfront Design Guide" of South Dublin County Council. Kerry County Council also issued the quite comprehensive "Shopfront Design Guidelines and Policy" document in 2010, and for Kilkenny City the "Shopfronts and Advertising Signs Kilkenny Planning Information Booklet."

There have been previous concerns sometimes raised that tax incentives, or the more recent planning 'exemptions' have, or may lead to confusion regarding permissible, or recommended interventions in shopfronts, such as removal of shopfront elements or otherwise good quality, traditional shopfronts that are often a feature of main streets, and for example are beneficial in terms of tourism and 'Tidy Towns' efforts.

TV celebrity gardener and presenter Diarmuid Gavin hosted two series of programmes called 'Dirty Old Towns' from 2011 to 2013 on the national broadcaster RTÉ1 that often highlighted the poor physical state of main streets in some well known towns in Ireland and showcased improvements to buildings or gardens in the town centres on or near their main street.

In a similar stream, it has been noted in the past, e.g. in the UK by its national print media, that '24/7' full Pedestrianisation of town centres and main streets can lead to passive security issues and fear of use in night time hours.

Noting likely economic impacts of the COVID-19 emergency (as of April 2020) on funds and economy, some refinement and redirection of URDF, and RRDF monies also towards more generalised, and labour-intensive refurbishments of main street's buildings may also have visible tangible impacts. This could be in cooperation with Local Authorities, state agencies, and private owners (e.g. subsidised external fabric refurbishments of derelict/ semi-derelict terraced buildings), and potentially project-led led by in-house expertise from for example, the LDA (Land Development Agency), and local Architects/ County Councils, or Heritage Council/ OPW (Office of Public Works), etc. The Urban Institute of Ireland (based in UCD), and the School of Environment and Planning (in DIT) could also help in terms of academic basis, research and development.

A similar voluntary 'townscape' society or similar (like the Georgian Society and Tidy Towns), for the promotion and restoration of town and village centres, could also have similar potential for project initiating/ leading benefits, to also help link the National Planning Framework (National Spatial Strategy replacement), and National Development Plans aims, in a similar fashion to the aim promulgated by the URDF and RRDF rationale. This is noting for example, that a report (2016 Pobal HP Deprivation Index) published in November 2007 by Pobal (an intermediary organisation for funding from the Irish government and the EU) found that

'Small towns (1,000 – 5,000 people) have been the worst effected over the past ten years, being disproportionately hit by the recession and benefiting less from the recovery than the most urban and the most rural areas.'

== List of streets named Main Street ==
=== Canada ===
- Main Street (Toronto), Ontario
- Main Street (Hamilton), Ontario
- Main Street Unionville, Ontario
- Main Street (Vancouver), British Columbia
- Winnipeg Route 52, Main Street in Winnipeg, Manitoba
- Niagara Regional Road 81, Main Street in Grimsby, Ontario
- York Regional Road 68, Main Street in the old village of Markham, Ontario
- York Regional Road 76, Main Street in Schomberg, Ontario
- Peel Regional Road 136, Main street in Alton, Ontario

=== Ireland ===
- Main Street, Letterkenny, Longest street in Ireland

=== United States ===
- U.S. Route 40, referred to as "Main Street of America" pre-WWII and post creation of the US route system
- U.S. Route 66, referred to as "Main Street of America" post-WWII and pre-Interstate network completion
- Pennsylvania Avenue, specifically the portion stretching from the White House to the United States Capitol, known as "America's Main Street"

By state, then city:

- Main Street (Los Angeles), California
- Main Street (Santa Monica, California)
- U.S. Route 20, signed as "Main Street" in Waltham and Watertown, Massachusetts
- Main Street (Mackinac Island, Michigan)
- Main Street (Kansas City, Missouri)
- Nevada State Route 601, Main Street in Las Vegas, Nevada
- Montauk Highway, Main Street in parts of Suffolk County, New York
- Main Street (Queens), New York
- Main Street District, Dallas, Texas
- Main Street (Greater Salt Lake City), Utah
- Main Street (York, Maine)

=== Gibraltar ===
- Main Street, Gibraltar

== Gallery ==
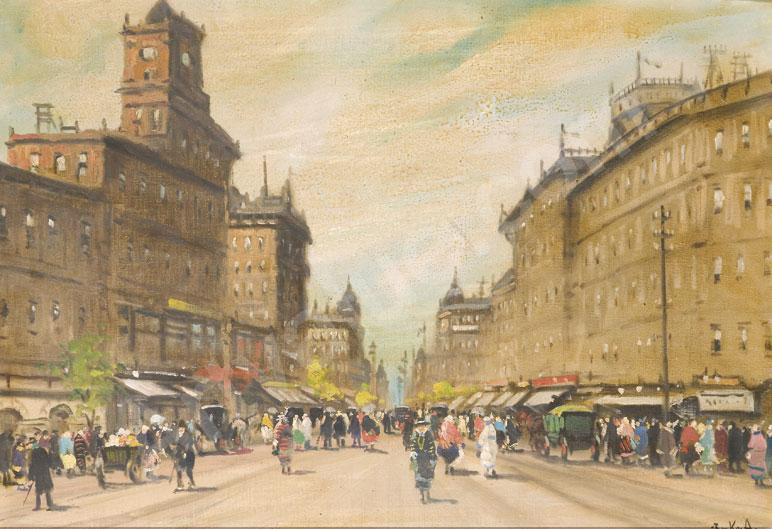
Main street (Hungarian: Főutca, literally "Principal Street") in Budapest, Hungary (by Antal Berkes)

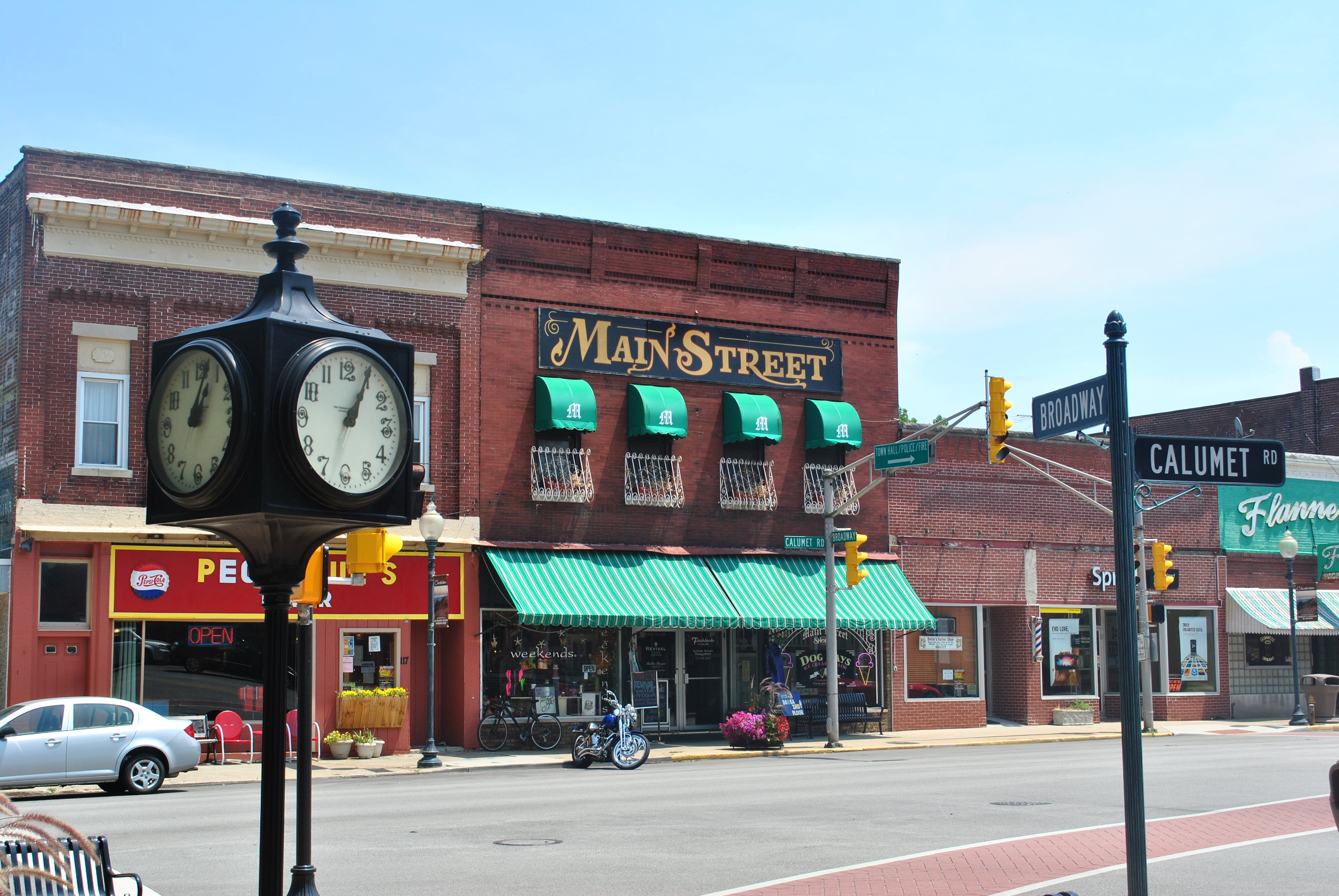
Main Street in Chesterton, Indiana

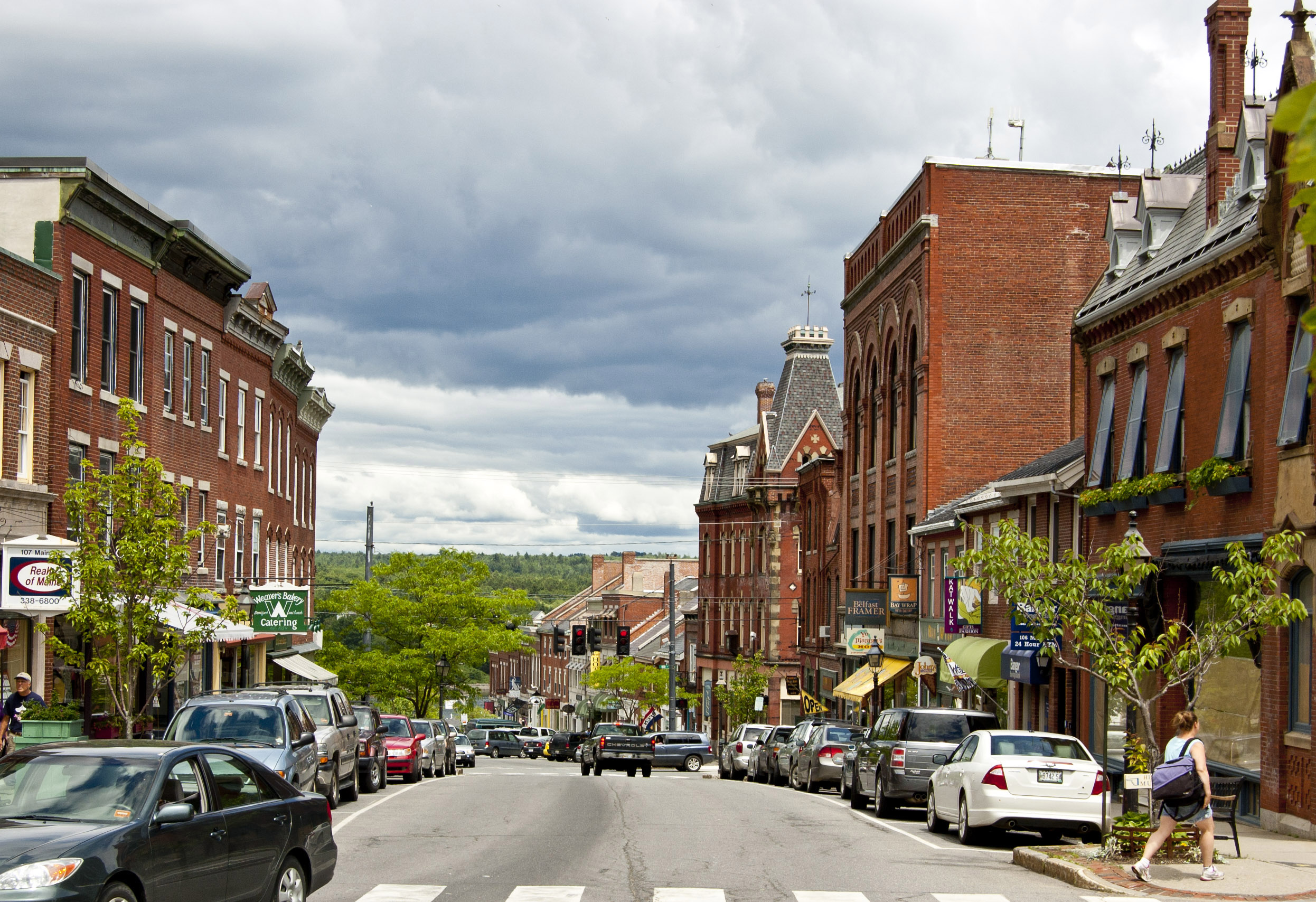
Main Street, Belfast, Maine

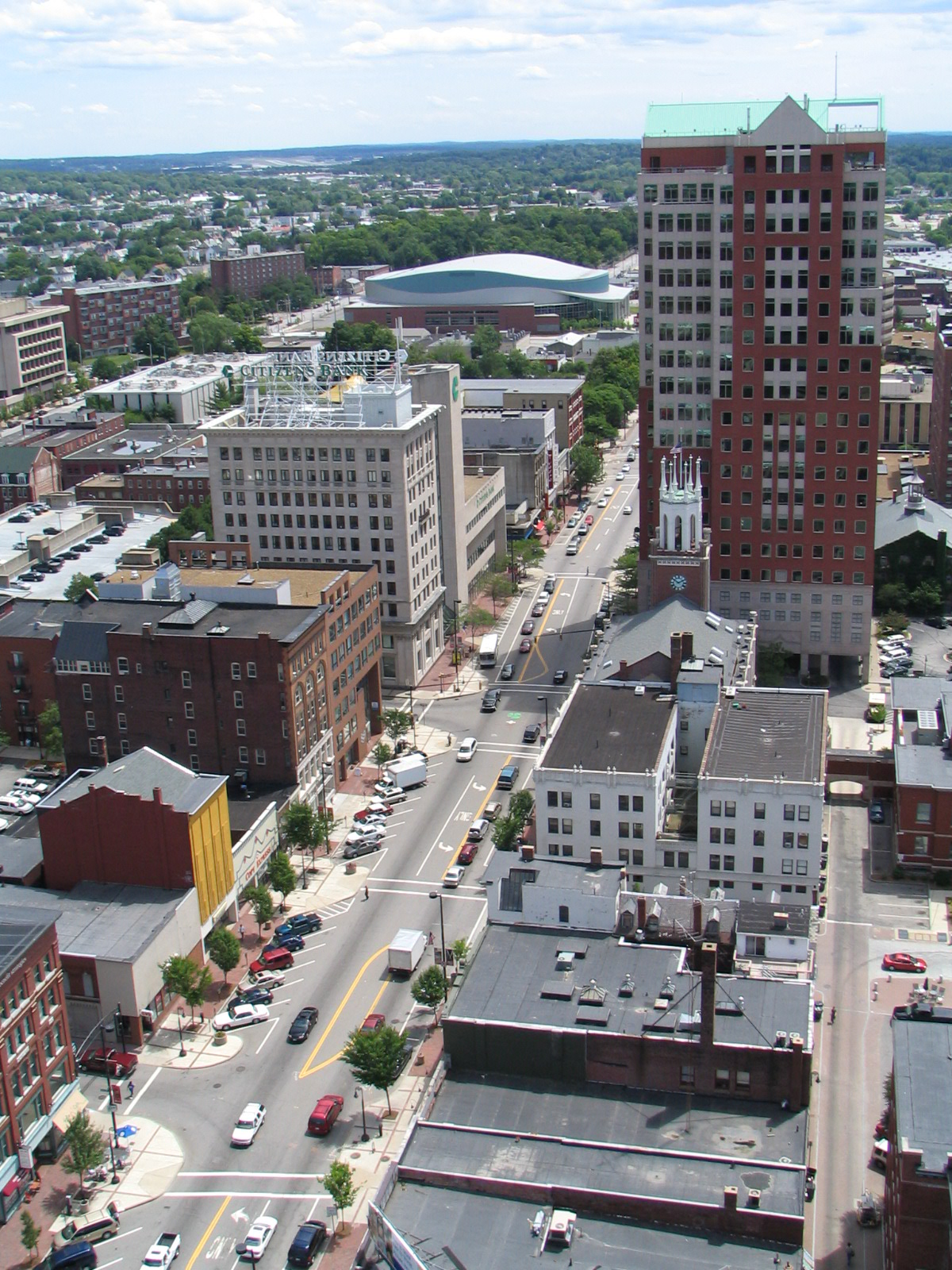
Elm Street, Manchester, New Hampshire, is the "main street" of the downtown central business district.

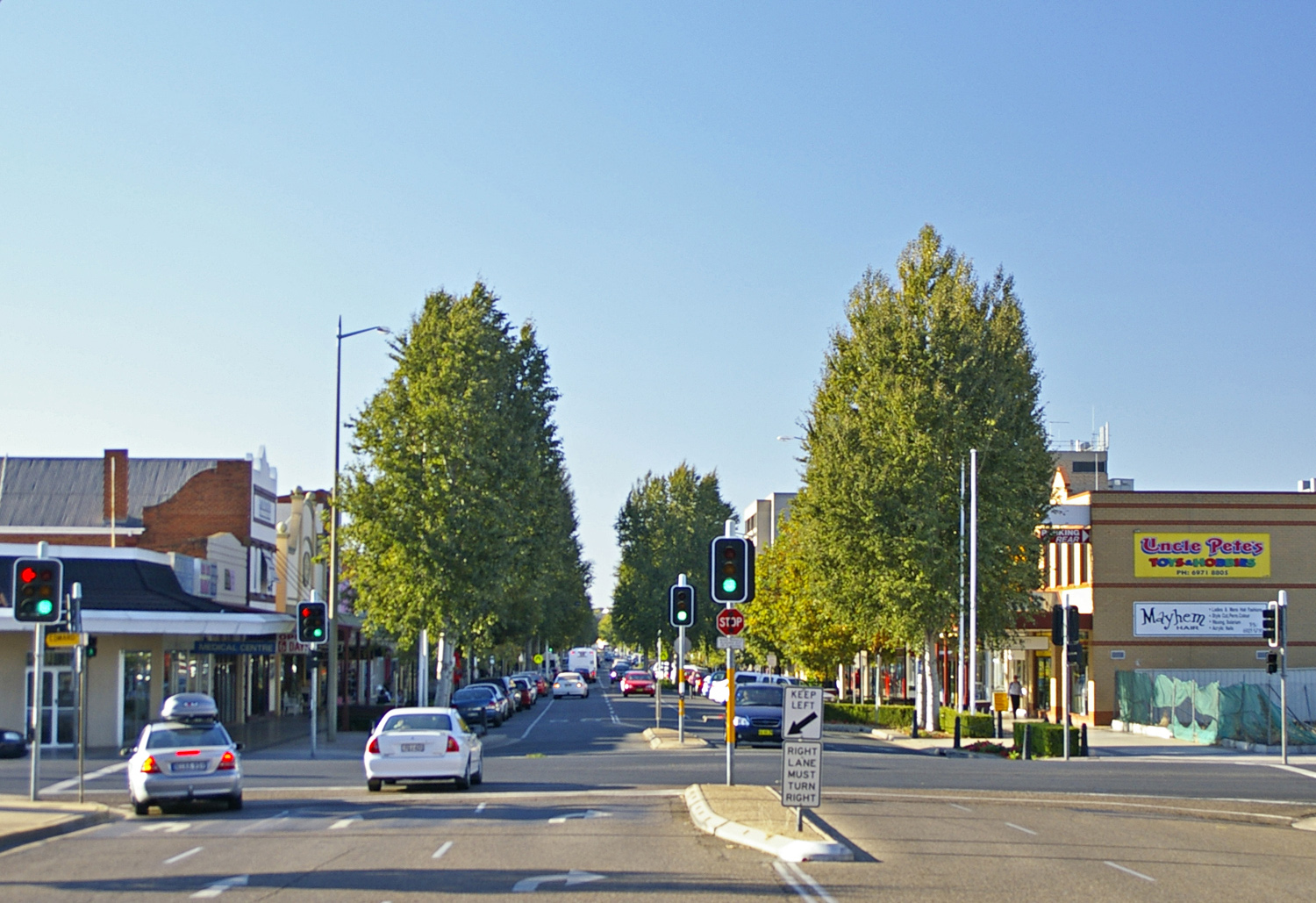
Baylis Street, the Main Street of Wagga Wagga, New South Wales

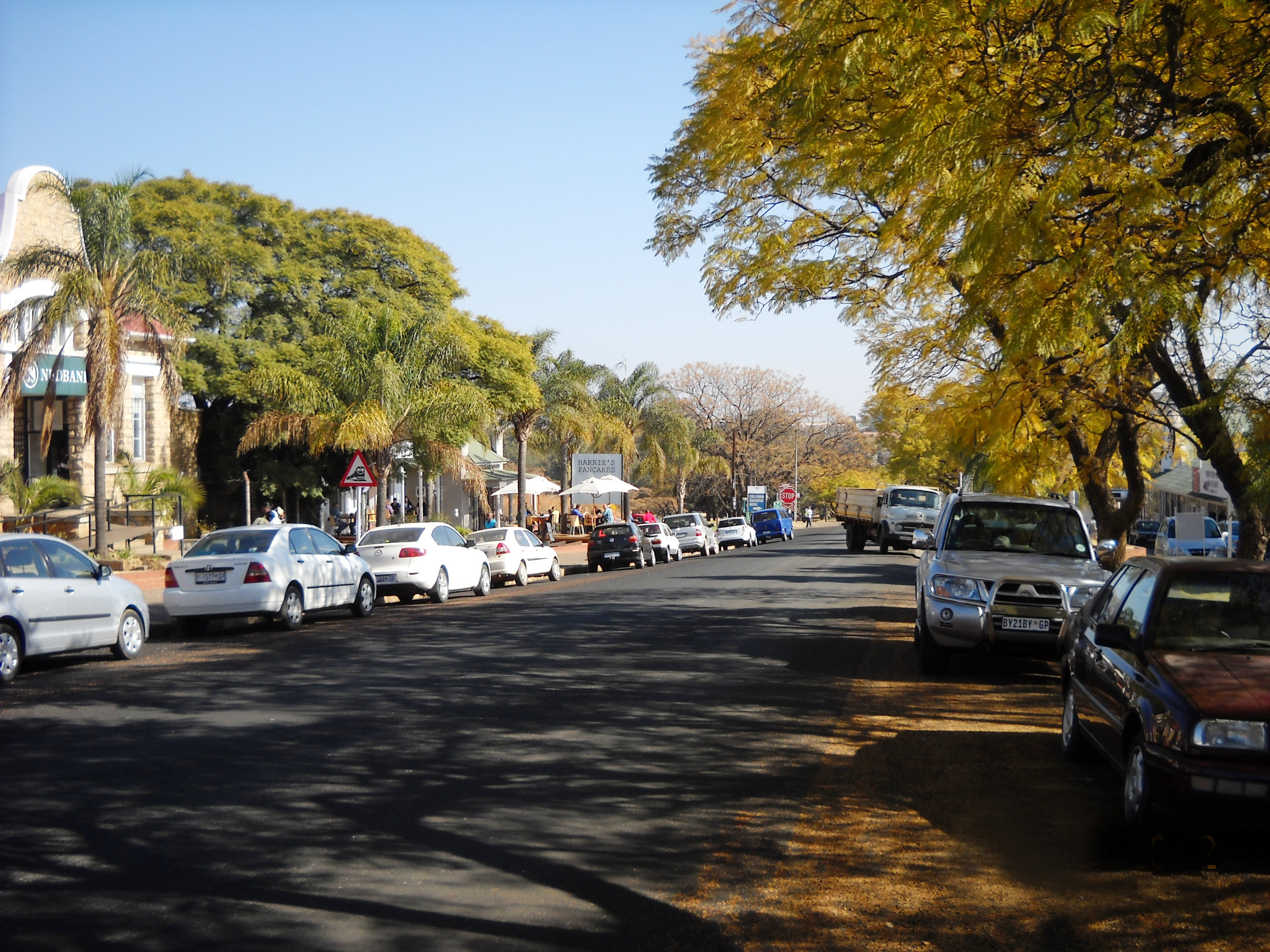
The Main Street of Cullinan, South Africa

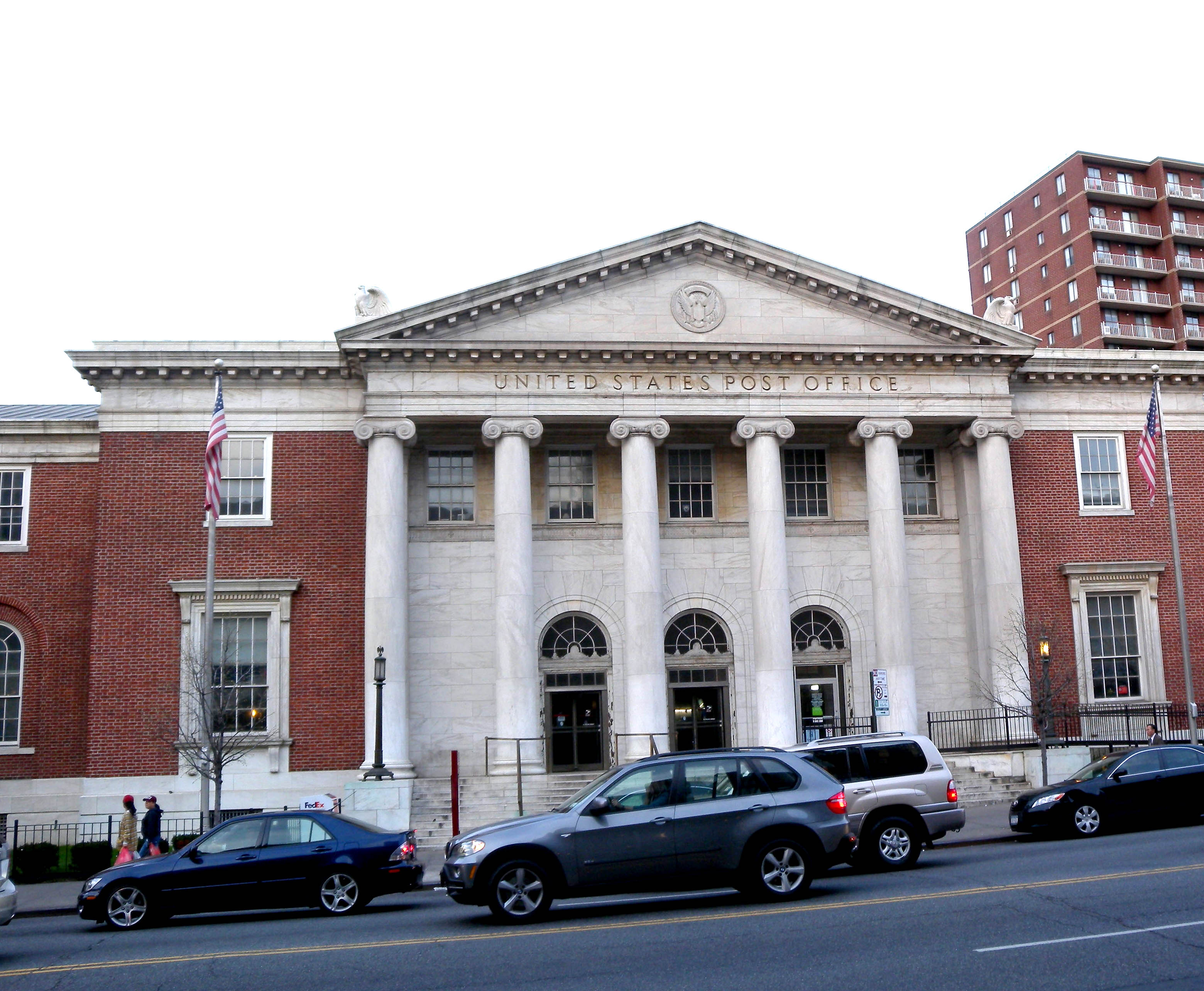
Looking across Main Street in Queens, New York, United States, at a post office. All five boroughs of New York City have streets named "Main Street", but this is the only one that is an arterial road.

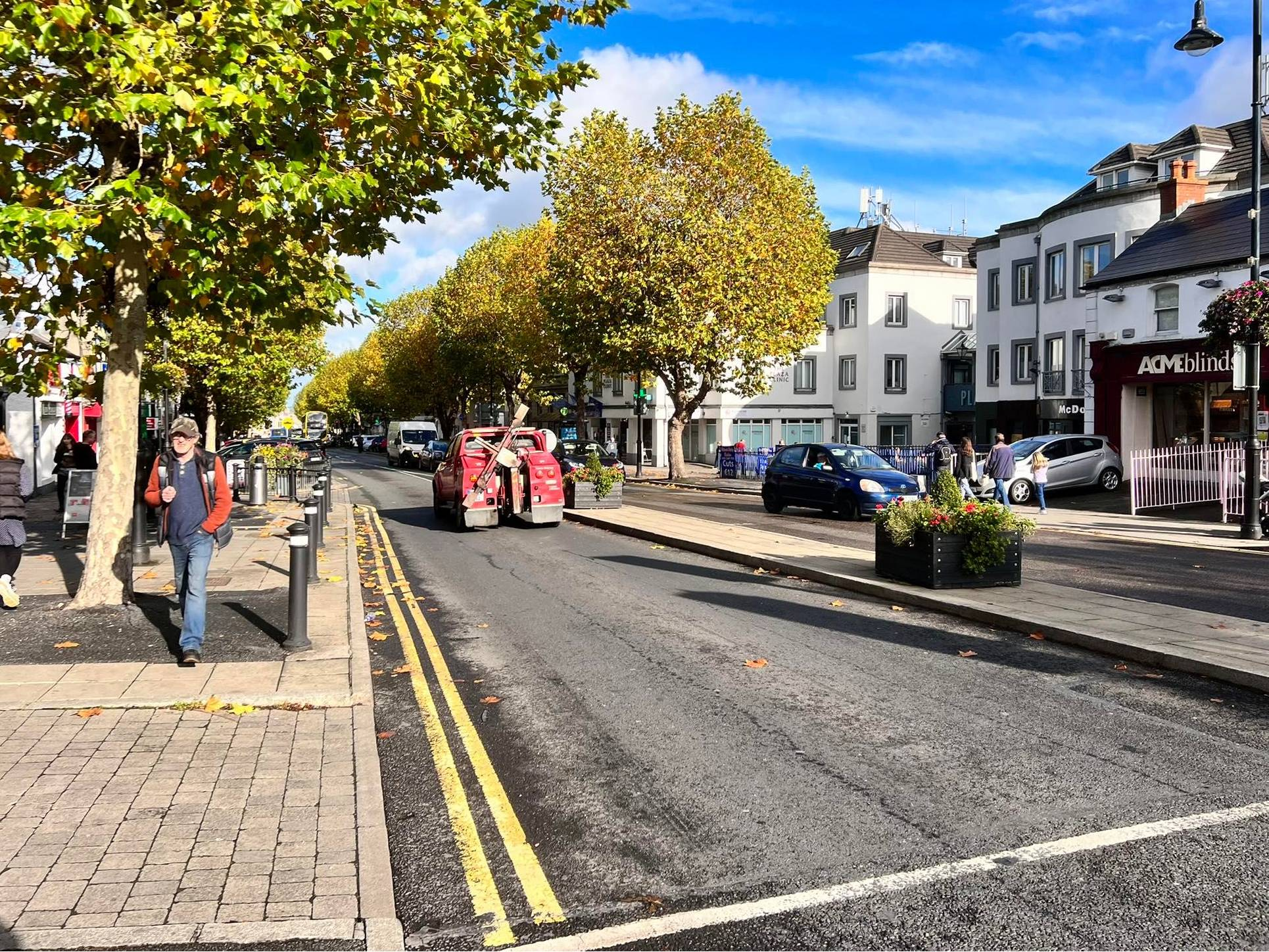
Main Street in the Dublin suburb of Swords

== See also ==
- Electric Avenue
- High Street
- K Street (Washington, D.C.)
- List of Main Street Programs in the United States
- Middletown studies
- Main Street, U.S.A.
- Shopping mall
- Side road
- Strip mall
- Town
- Wall Street
- "Will it play in Peoria?"
