= Jason Sprinkle =

American sculptor

- Born: November 6, 1969; Fullerton, California
- Died: May 16, 2005 (aged 35); Long Beach, Mississippi
- Education: Job Corps
- Known for: Sculpture, Guerrilla art
- Notable work: Ball and Chain; The Heart of Seattle; The Heart of the American Youth
- Movement: Fabricators of the Attachment

Jason Sprinkle (November 6, 1969 – May 16, 2005) was a Seattle-based sculptor and guerrilla artist. He was most famous for attaching a 700-pound ball and chain around the foot of Jonathan Borofsky's Hammering Man outside the Seattle Art Museum, and for various other unauthorised art sculptures left at Westlake Park. These actions ended in July 1996 when Sprinkle's final sculpture caused a bomb scare and Sprinkle was briefly imprisoned. After suffering a mental breakdown in jail, Sprinkle stopped making art and became a born again Christian. He died in 2005 after being hit by a train.

== Life ==
Sprinkle was born in Fullerton, California and raised in Seattle. In his youth he earned his GED from Job Corps and learned the craft of welding.

On Labor Day, September 6, 1993, Sprinkle and a group of other local Seattle artists caused a local sensation by attaching an unauthorised 700-pound ball and chain around the foot of Jonathan Borofsky's Hammering Man outside of the Seattle Art Museum. The Seattle Arts Commission's director Wendy Ceccherelli famously criticized the group's actions and publicly stated "I wouldn't call these people artists, I'd call them fabricators of the attachment." Sprinkle and his friends then began calling themselves the Fabricators of the Attachment, or FA, and Sprinkle earned the nickname "Subculture Joe." Other members of the Fabricators of the Attachment included Art Donnelly, Rob Shealy and Jim Blanchard. The Ball and Chain was attached to Hammering Man until September 8, when the Seattle Engineering Department removed it. It was then auctioned for $1,300 in October 1993 for a fundraiser for Job Corps.

On Valentine's Day 1994 Sprinkle and the Fabricators of the Attachment installed a 13-foot steel sculpture of a black heart with a dagger in it titled The Heart of Seattle in Westlake Park in the middle of downtown Seattle. Sprinkle and the Fabricators of the Attachment continued to make and install sculptures without authorisation at Westlake Park for several years in the mid-1990s, such as a large Frankenstein-inspired sculpture called Frankentree.

On July 15, 1996, Sprinkle left another sculpture in Westlake Park, intending it to be his last sculpture of that type. The sculpture used Sprinkle's own pickup truck (which had always been used to deliver the previous sculptures to Westlake Park) with a large metal, anatomically correct 10-foot human heart loaded into it. Titled The Heart of the American Youth, Sprinkle was inspired to make the sculpture after the unhappy end of a romantic relationship and originally intended to deliver the sculpture to President Bill Clinton. It was originally commissioned by Job Corps to celebrate its thirtieth anniversary on Washington D.C. Sprinkle drove the heart around parts of the country and visited several Job Corps site to lecture and allow young people to sign the heart. One such signature included the words "The Bomb!", intended as a slang term for being great. This caused the Seattle Police to call the bomb squad, utilize a bomb robot and seal off a nine-block area in downtown Seattle for four hours.

Sprinkle was arrested and served 33 days in jail as a suspected terrorist. In jail he began to suffer a mental breakdown after not being allowed to take his prescribed medication. After he was released from jail Sprinkle visited family members in Mississippi. There he became a born-again Christian and renounced his artistic ambitions. When he returned to Seattle his religious beliefs alienated him from friends and members of the arts community. Sprinkle's artwork became less frequent after he was arrested, and was only shared with family and close friends. According to his mother, Sprinkle "worked on a couple pieces, with crosses and stuff, but he didn't follow through. He just didn't have the same drive and excitement."

Sprinkle died on May 16, 2005, at the age of 35, while he was visiting family and working as a youth minister in Long Beach, Mississippi. He was hit by a freight train and his body was later discovered by a passing train conductor. There were no witnesses and his death was ruled as accidental.

In October 2008 Seattle artist Doug Parry and Sprinkle's mother attempted to arrange to have the original Ball and Chain used in 1993 installed at the Olympic Sculpture Park in downtown Seattle. The sculpture was owned by Tacoma developer Jan Schmalenberg, who had it on display in a Tacoma office building.
