= Molecule Man (sculpture) =

Sculpture series by Jonathan Borofsky

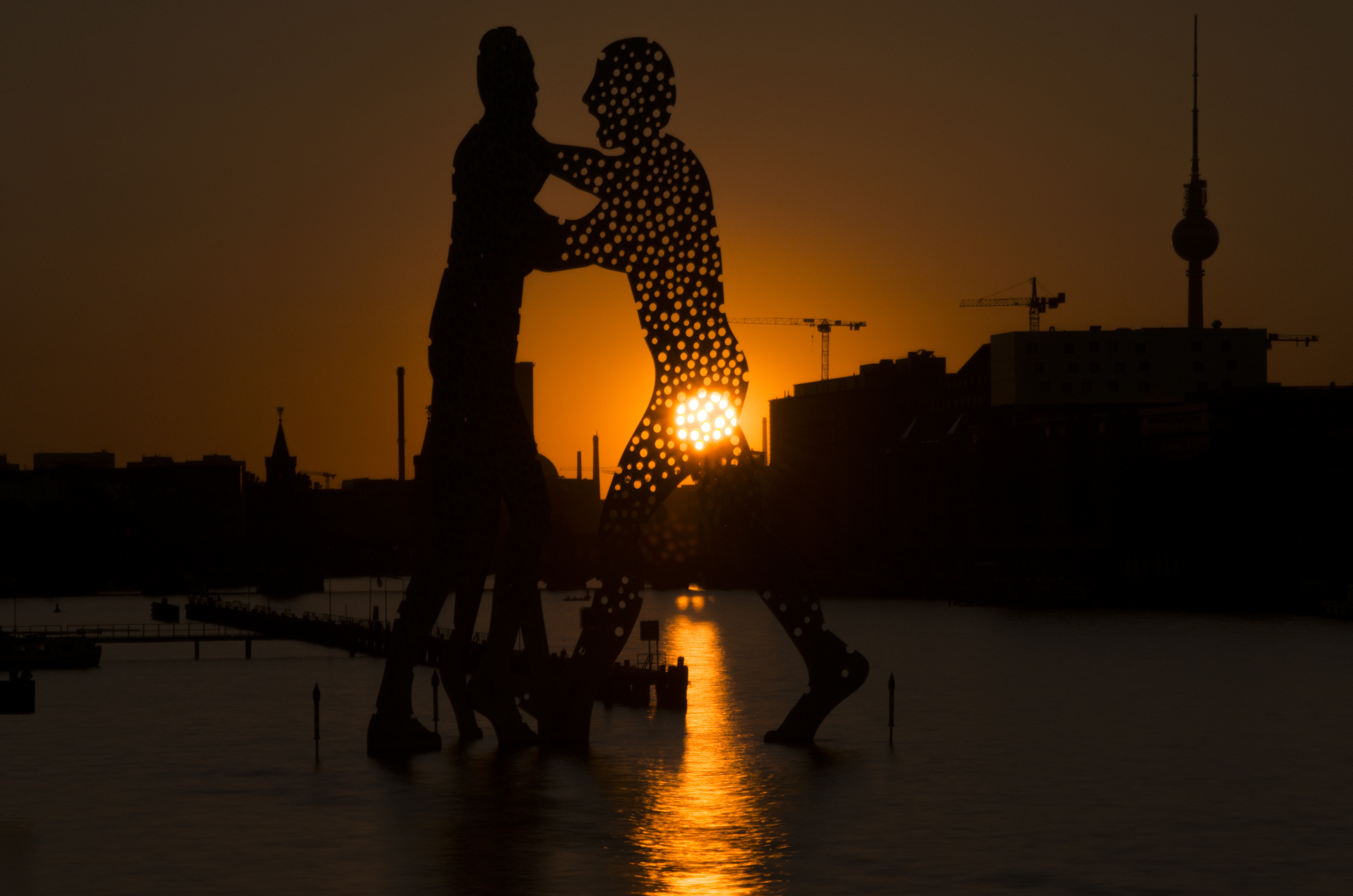
- Molecule Man seen at sunset from the Eisenbrücke at S-Bahnhof Treptower Park.
- Artist: Jonathan Borofsky
- Year: 1977
- Medium: Aluminium
- Subject: Three human form silhouettes
- 52°29′49.1″N 13°27′32.6″E

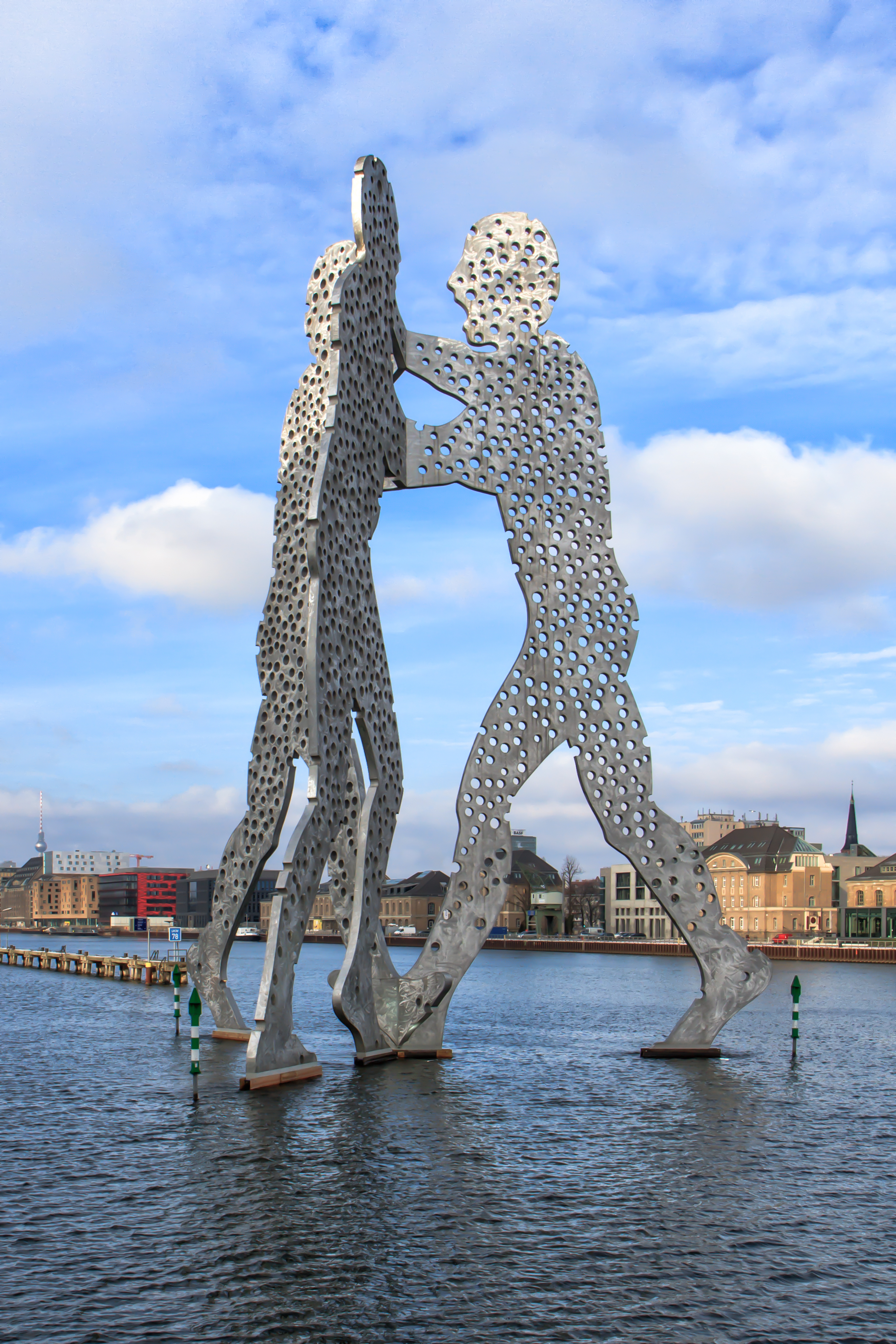
30 m Molecule Man sculpture on the Spree River, Berlin, Germany, viewed from Treptowers.

Molecule Man is a series of aluminium sculptures, designed by American artist Jonathan Borofsky, installed at various locations around the world, including Germany and the United States. Borofsky made the first Molecule Man sculptures for locations in Los Angeles in 1977 and 1978. They were installed later in 1981 and 1983 (in Los Angeles and Beverly Hills, respectively).

The sculpture model depicts three human form silhouettes with hundreds of holes, leaning toward each other. According to Borofsky, the holes represent "the molecules of all human beings coming together to create our existence."

A related sculpture is Borofsky's Hammering Man.
