= Walking Man (Borofsky) =

Sculpture by Jonathan Borofsky

Coordinates: 48.15640°N 11.58445°E

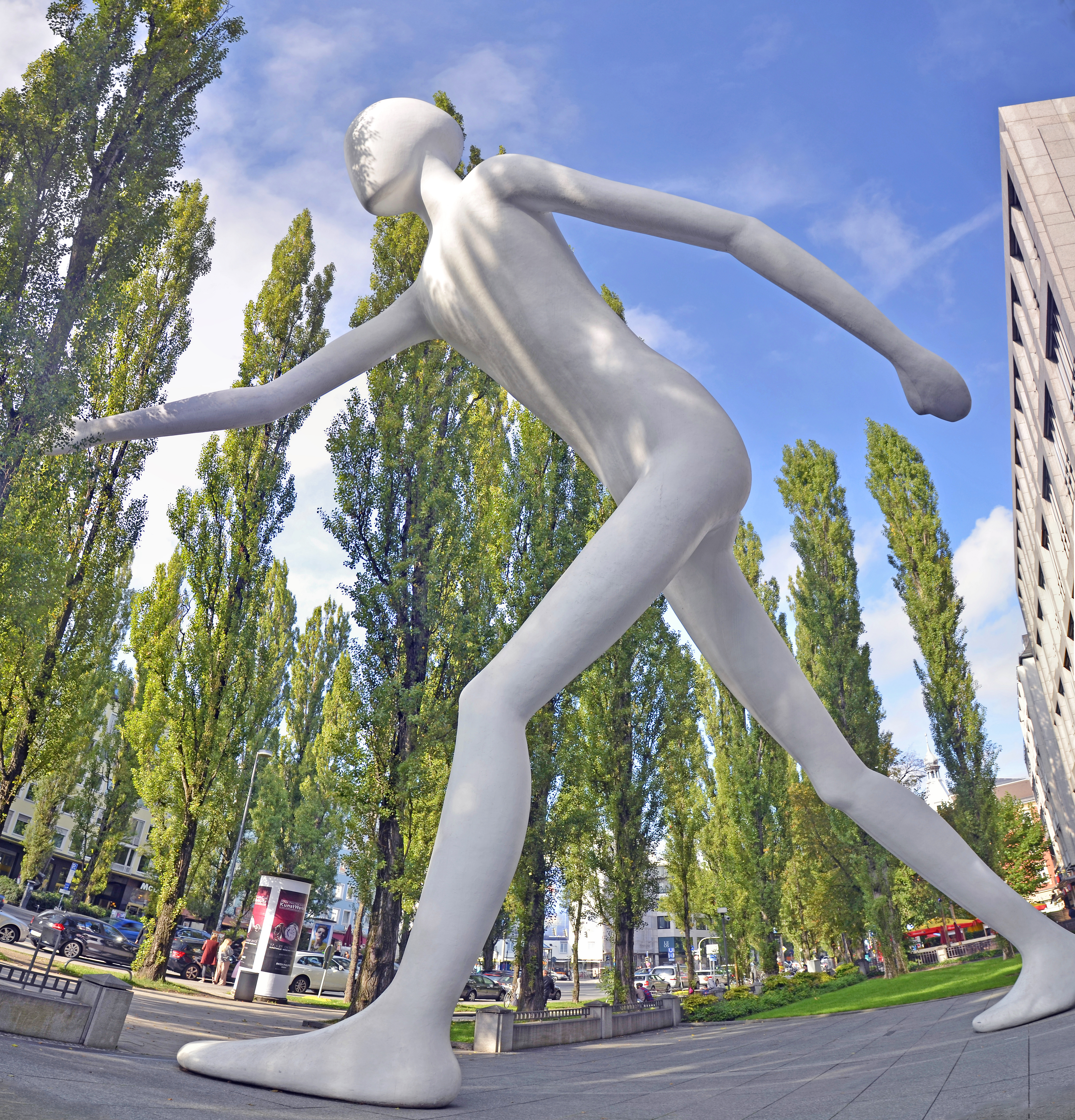
- Artist: Jonathan Borofsky
- Year: 1995; 30 years ago
- Medium: Sculpture
- Dimensions: (17 metres (56 ft) in)
- Weight: 16 tonnes (35,000 lb)
- Location: Leopoldstraße, Munich, Germany

Walking Man is a 1995 sculpture by Jonathan Borofsky, standing 17 metres (56 ft) tall and weighing 16 tonnes (35,000 lb). It is located on the Leopoldstraße in Munich, next to the Munich Re business premises. It was presented to the public on 21 September 1995 by then-head of Re, Hans-Jürgen Schinzler, and then-mayor of Munich, Christian Ude.

After presenting the 25-meter high Man Walking to the Sky sculpture at Documenta 9, Borofsky was one of six artists invited to the competition for Re's new building. The sculpture was initially created in Los Angeles, and took more than a year to complete. It was shipped to Munich in nine pieces. The work has been well received by the press and is popular with the public.
