= Male/Female (Borofsky) =

Sculpture by Jonathan Borofsky

- Artist: Jonathan Borofsky
- Year: 2004
- Medium: Stainless steel
- Subject: Male and female human figures
- Dimensions: 15.5 m cm (51 ft. in)
- Weight: 20,000–28,000 lb (9,100–12,700 kg) (approx.)
- Location: Baltimore, Maryland; 39.3071°N 76.6159°W
- Owner: City of Baltimore

Male/Female is a 15.5-meter (51 ft) tall hollow stainless steel sculpture by Jonathan Borofsky standing at the entrance to Penn Station in Baltimore, Maryland. It depicts intersecting colossal male and female forms with pulsing light-emitting diode light.

== History ==
Male/Female is a work of public art commissioned by the Municipal Art Society of Baltimore City, a private non-profit organization founded in 1899 "to provide sculptural and pictoral [sic] decoration and ornaments for the public buildings, streets and open spaces in the City of Baltimore, and to help generally beautify the City." Male/Female was created by artist Jonathan Borofksy as the centerpiece of a re-designed plaza in front of Penn Station. The project celebrated the Municipal Art Society's centennial and was completed in 2004. The sculpture was given to the City as a gift.

== Critical reception ==
Male/Female has generated considerable controversy ever since its installation. Its defenders cite the contemporary imagery and artistic expression as complementing an urban landscape, while opponents criticize what they decry as a clash with Penn Station's Beaux-Arts architecture, detracting from its classic lines.

It has been named both Baltimore's kinkiest piece of public art, "The Invasion of the 50-Foot She-Male" that "bends genders and may very well affirm life", and one of the city's best "bizarre" statues.

The Baltimore Sun editorially characterized it as "oversized, underdressed, and woefully out of place" at the time of its unveiling. Two years later, the Sun continued its criticism, saying:

Could this explain why defenders of "Male/Female", the sculpture in front of Penn Station, get so irritable? That large piece of quadrupedal artwork is out there all on its own, unclothed of commemorative armor that might deflect public criticism – unless you want to think of it as a memorial to the war between the sexes, but that's an issue that people tend to have a lot of different and strongly held opinions about anyway. No, "Male/Female" gets a lot of attention strictly on its artistic merits, and much of it isn't very positive, especially concerning its setting in front of the Beaux–Arts railroad station. This drives its proponents up the wall."

Baltimore Sun columnist Dan Rodricks also ridiculed the artwork, writing on August 26, 2007, "Patrons of art here paid $750,000 for a 51-foot sculpture ... that looks like Gort from The Day the Earth Stood Still. I look at it and want to say: 'Klaatu barada nikto!' It's the first thing visitors see when they walk out of the train station." Another Sun reporter, commenting in July 2008 on what she described as the "stormy relationship" between Baltimore and public art, said "People's hate for Penn Station's behemoth Male/Female sculpture has burned for years."

The statue has been featured a few times in the Zippy comic strip, beginning with the August 26, 2004 installment. Its cartoonist, Bill Griffith, opined that "the sculpture as I look at it is both intriguing and compelling but also a little kitschy, and I like that. It's a nice place to be – high art and low art at the same time." He was also attracted to its message that people are full of contradictions and its provocativeness, stating that "you can't not react to it."

Conceptual plans presented by developers in 2021 for the improvement of Penn Station and its environs did not include the controversial Male/Female aluminum statue. The developers said no decision has been reached about its future. In a June 8, 2021, editorial, the Baltimore Sun called for public input on the issue.

== Other locations ==
Smaller versions of the sculpture exist in Kagoshima, Japan (24 feet (7.3 m) tall), Bielefeld, Germany (30 feet (9.1 m) tall), and Grand Rapids, Michigan at the Frederik Meijer Gardens & Sculpture Park (23 feet (7 m) tall).
