= Westlake Park (Seattle) =

Public plaza in Downtown Seattle

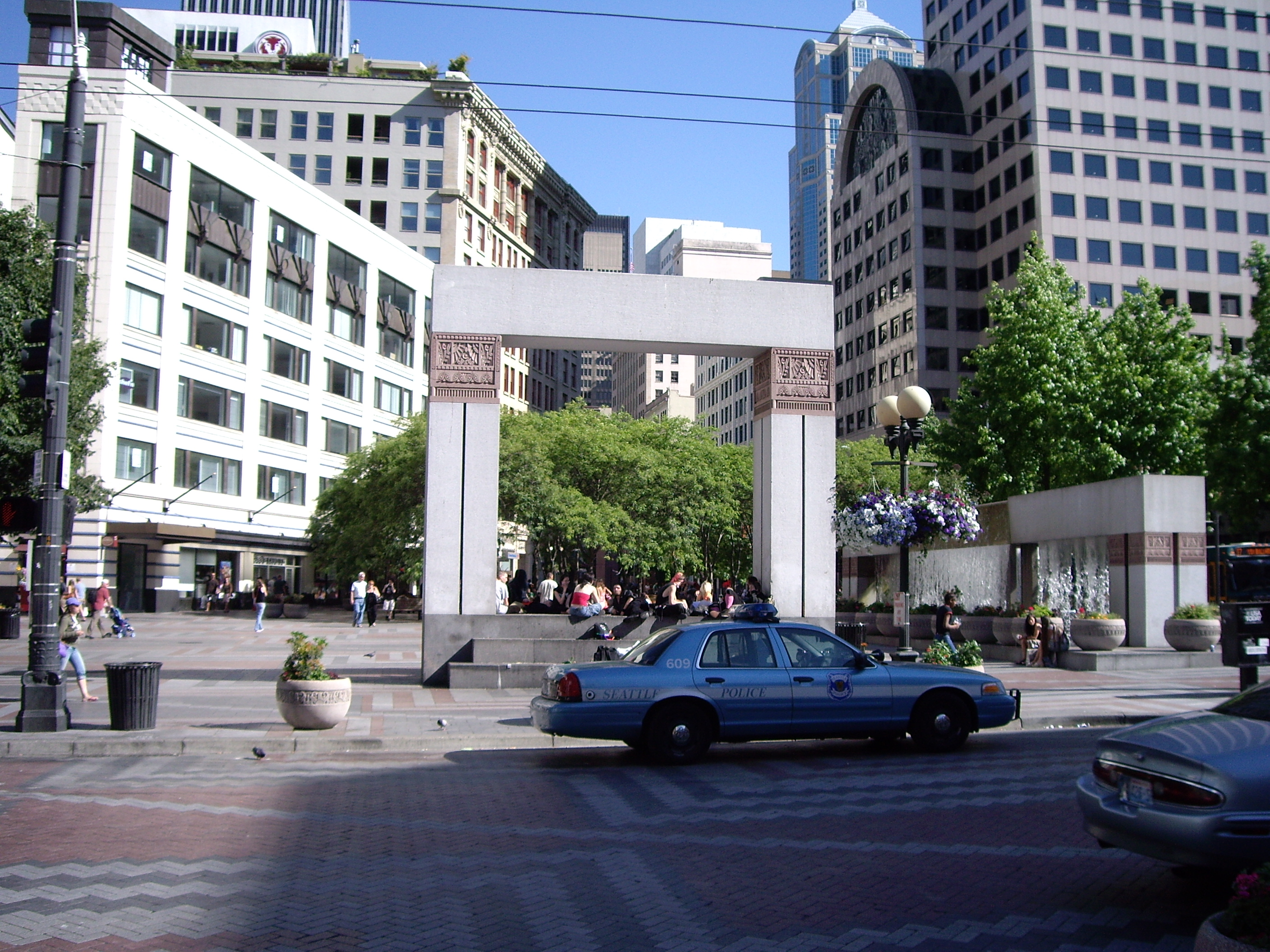
- Westlake Park in 2006
- Interactive map of Westlake Park
- Type: Urban park and Plaza
- Location: Seattle, Washington
- Coordinates: 47°36′40″N 122°20′13″W
- Area: 0.1 acres (400 m^{2})
- Established: October 1988; 38 years ago
- Designer: Robert Mitchell Hanna
- Operator: Seattle Parks and Recreation

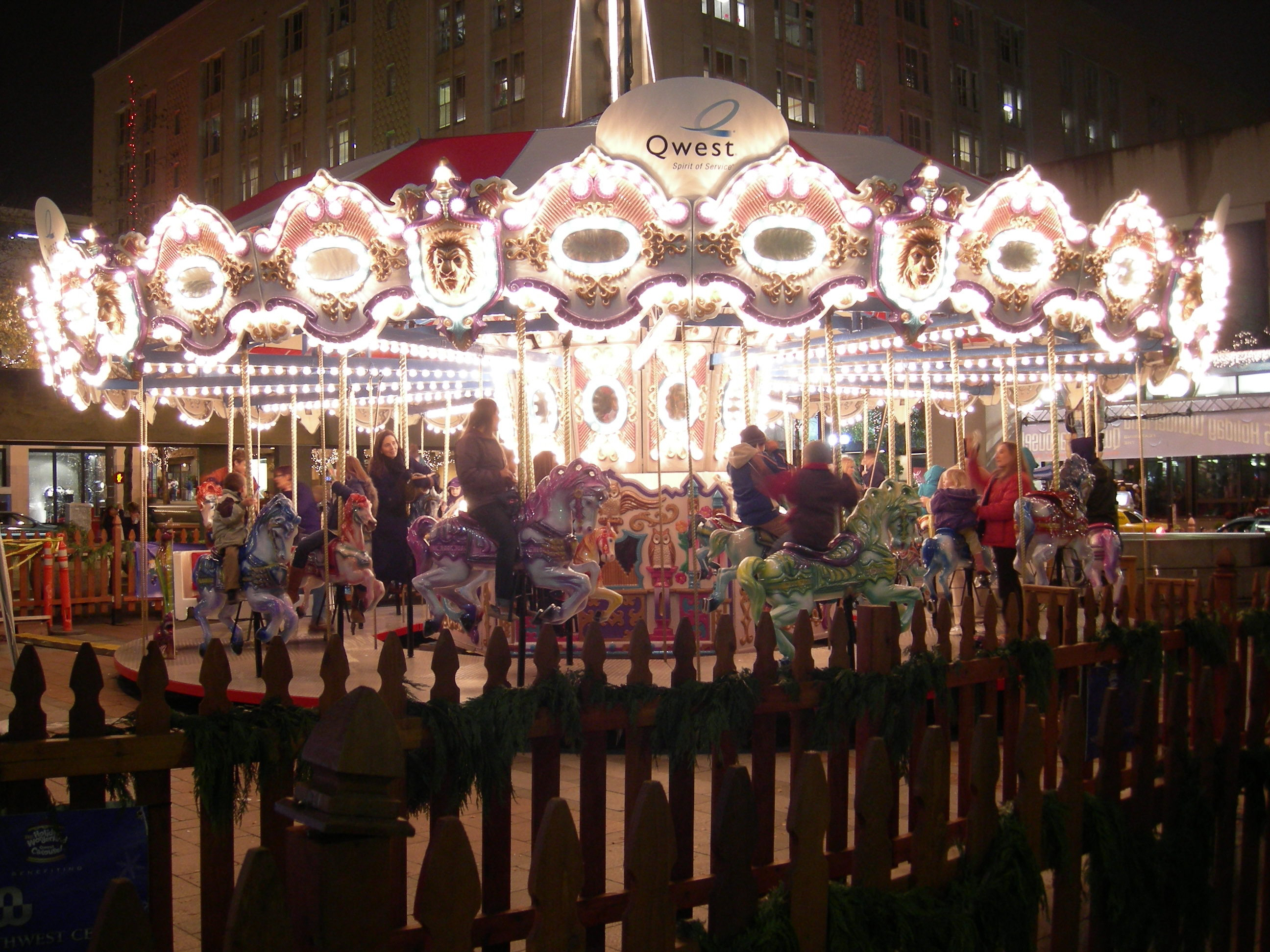
Carousel at Westlake Park during the holiday season

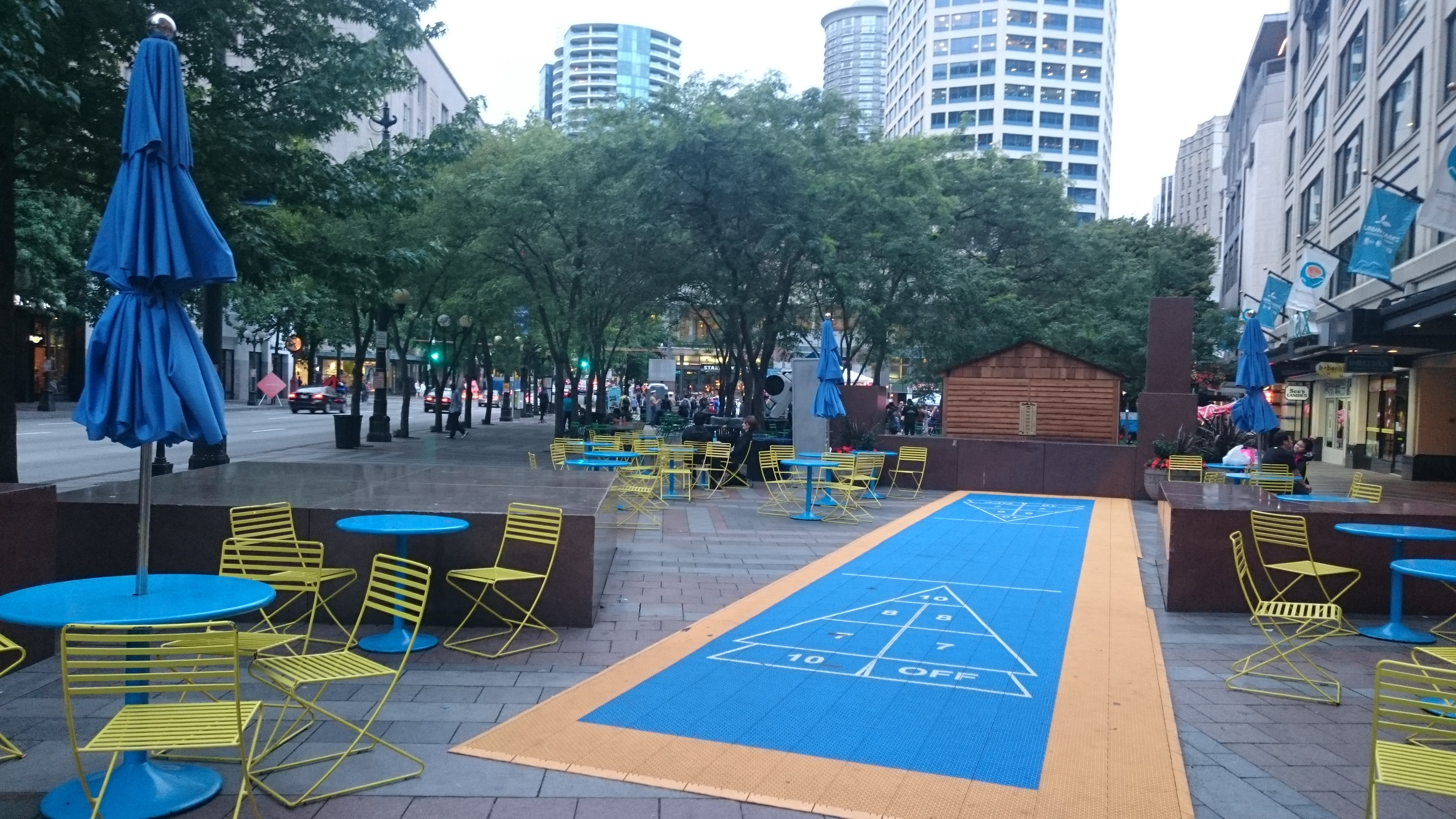
Shuffleboard and seating area

Westlake Park is a 0.1-acre (400 m^{2}) public plaza in Downtown Seattle, Washington, United States. It was designed by Robert Mitchell Hanna and opened in 1988. The park extends out to Pine Street and Westlake Center, a shopping mall that also connects to the Seattle Center Monorail and Link light rail at Westlake station.

== Description ==
Extending east from 4th Avenue up to and including a former portion of Westlake Avenue between Pike and Pine streets, it is located across Pine Street from the Westlake Center shopping mall and Westlake station, a major monorail and light rail hub. The park and mall are named for Westlake Avenue, which now terminates north of the mall, but once ran two blocks farther south to Pike Street through the present site of the mall and park. Westlake Park is considered Seattle's "town square", and celebrities and political figures often make appearances or give speeches from the four-story shopping center's balcony.

== History ==
=== Background ===
The site of Westlake Park was formed with the construction of Westlake Avenue (née Boulevard) in 1905, which cut through the existing city block bounded by 4th Avenue and Pine Street on the northwest corner. Simultaneous to the street construction, Samuel Rosenberg bought the newly carved triangular parcel in April 1905 with the intent to dedicate it towards retail use. Rosenberg subsequently commissioned architect A. W. Spaulding to design the first building on the new parcel: a four-story flatiron building with a light steel frame and brick cladding. Later revised with a reinforced concrete skeleton instead, it was designed to host stores on the ground level and a hotel on the upper levels. Before construction on the building started, Rosenberg sold the property that November to Charles D. Stimson, who received construction permits in January 1906.

The building was topped off in October 1906 and fully completed by February 1907, but not before the first proposal for a park on the site was floated in January 1907 by neighboring landowners who called for its demolition to facilitate the widening of its adjacent streets. Initially named the Plaza Hotel, the building was renamed the Hotel Wingfield and expanded to eight stories by 1913 when Stimson offered to swap the property with the Seattle city government for a nearby fire station to have it repurposed as a municipal building; by 1923, it was operating as the Georgian Annex Hotel under the purview of Maltby–Thurston Hotels.

While another park site plan was floated by the city's Planning Commission in 1929, Stimson's company proceeded to demolish the hotel in August 1935 in favor of a two-story concrete building cladded in Tennessee marble that was designed by R. C. Reamer and opened by January 1936. Having perceived an underflow of lease income at the hotel relative to the site's potential, the new building was leased to local pharmacy retailer Bartell Drugs as their new flagship store at more than twice the total rate of income received from the hotel. Despite the sale of the building to a group of investors in September 1959, the store continued to operate until April 1984, with the building subsequently hosting a J.K. Gill store before it was ultimately torn down in January 1987.

=== Park planning and construction ===
The city first proposed a pedestrian mall in 1959 between Pike and Stewart Streets. The southernmost block of Westlake Avenue (between Pike and Pine) was closed to traffic in the early 1960s to construct the original southern terminus of the Monorail. This arrangement continued from the time the Monorail opened in 1962 (in conjunction with the Century 21 Exposition) until the construction of the current mall and park.

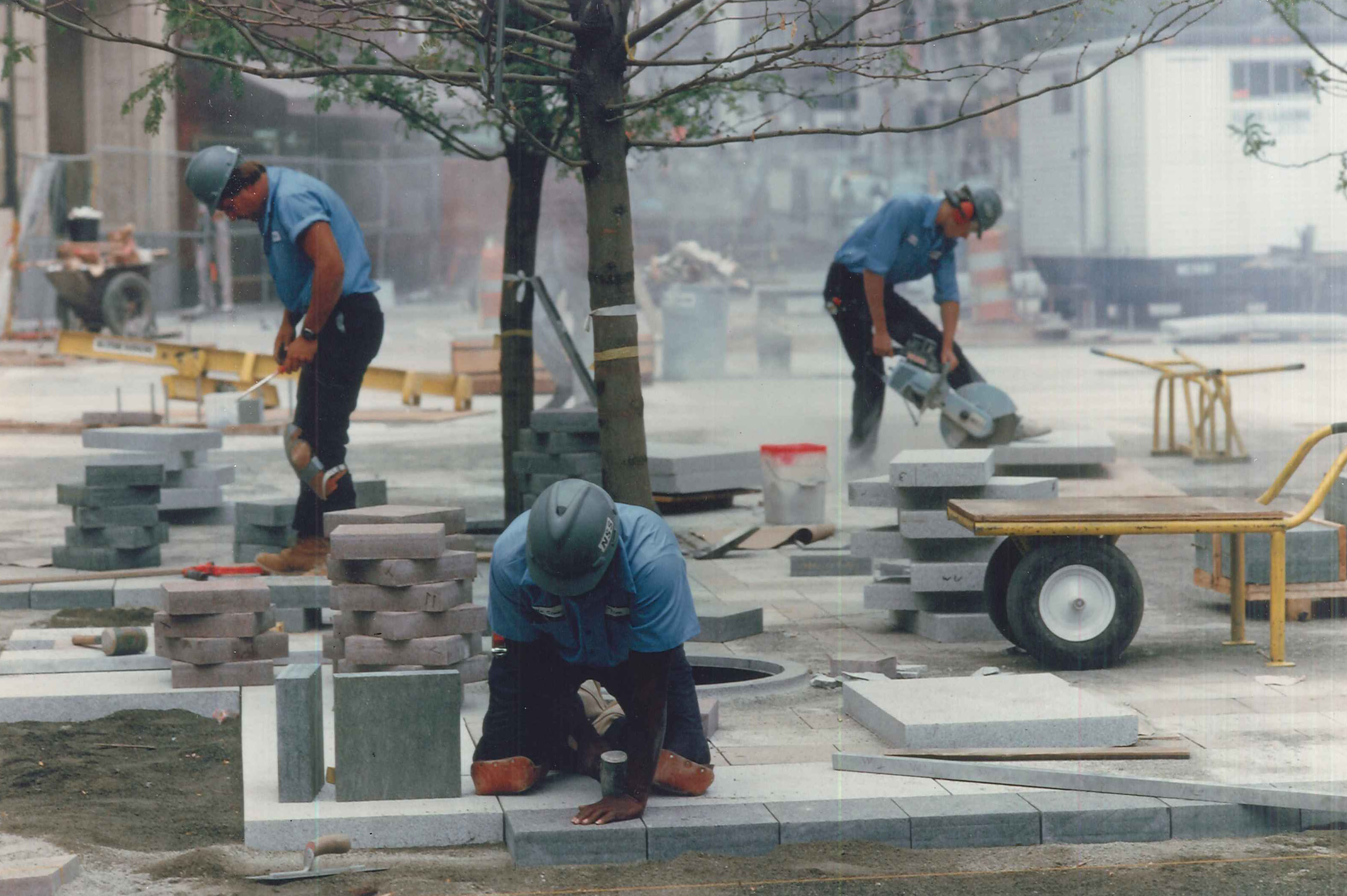
Building Westlake Park, c. 1987

The current park and mall were proposed by the Central Association (now Downtown Seattle Association) in 1968; they took 20 years to come to fruition. Multiple lawsuits were filed throughout this time and continued after the park's opening in October 1988. The project was marred by a design flaw, the so-called "Nightmare on Pine Street", that resulted in cracked granite pavers along Pine Street and into the intersection with Fourth Avenue. The city sued the designer and won an out-of-court settlement of $515,000, enough to cover the $472,000 repair and nearly equal to the cost of the original installation. Repairs began in June 1989.

After the pavers were repaired and the Downtown Seattle Transit Tunnel was completed in 1990, Seattle City Council decided to keep Pine Street closed to through traffic, making it effectively part of the park, and tying the park to the open area on the south side of the mall. However, Seattle citizens voted in 1995 to reopen the street, as part of a deal under which Nordstrom took over the flagship store of the former Frederick & Nelson department store chain, a city landmark half a block from the park. In the mid-1990s Westlake Park was the site of a string of guerrilla art pranks led by Jason Sprinkle and the Fabricators of the Attachment, culminating in an infamous bomb scare incident that closed off several downtown blocks.

Adjacent to the southernmost portion of the park is the Seaboard Building, another designated Seattle landmark. This 1909 headquarters of the Northern Bank & Trust Co. was one of the first major commercial buildings this far north in the downtown area. The ground floor is commercial space, Floors 2 through 6 are offices, and Floors 7 through the 11th floor penthouse are now Condominium apartments. Diagonally across from the park at 4th and Pine, until its closure in February 2020, was a Macy's department store—another designated landmark building, having once been the flagship store of The Bon Marché chain.

A children's playground was added to he park in 2013. Management of Westlake Park and Occidental Park in Pioneer Square was transferred to the Downtown Seattle Association in 2015 with the goal of activating the spaces. Several pieces of furniture, chess boards, ping pong tables, and other amenities were added to Westlake. Westlake Park was closed in October 2025 to undergo a significant renovation in time for the 2026 FIFA World Cup, scheduled to begin in June. The $4 million project included the removal of the fountain and arch, installation of traffic bollards and other protection against vehicular crashes, and new landscaping. The removal of the arch, where speeches were traditionally held, was criticized as an attempt to limit protests at the park; other structures, including pieces of artwork, were also removed amid allegations of an incomplete public comment process. Westlake Park reopened on May 28, 2026, and was the host of World Cup watch parties for several weeks.
