= Walking to the Sky =

Outdoor sculpture by Jonathan Borofsky

Coordinates: 40.4441°N 79.9428°W

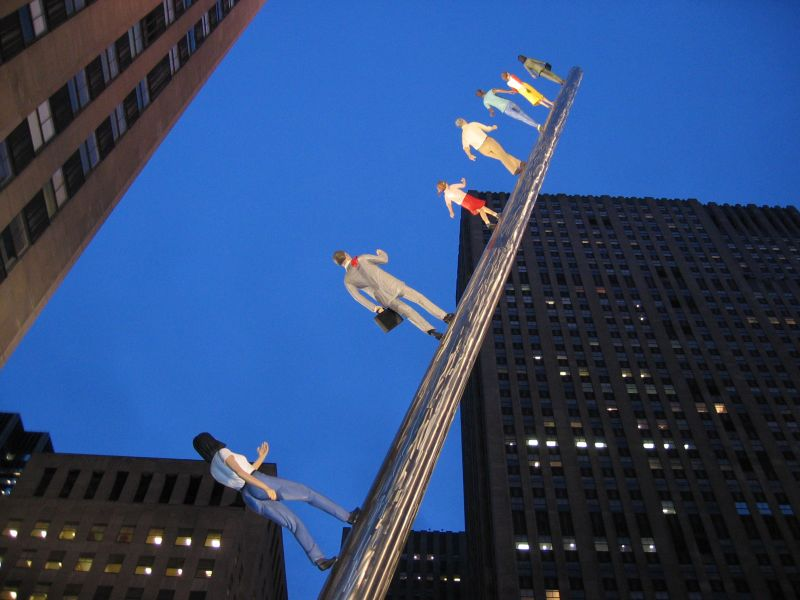
- Artist: Jonathan Borofsky
- Year: 2004
- Type: Sculpture
- Location: Nasher Sculpture Center, Dallas

Walking to the Sky is an outdoor sculpture by Jonathan Borofsky. The original was installed at Rockefeller Center in the fall of 2004 before being moved to the Nasher Sculpture Center in Dallas, Texas in 2005. A copy is installed on the campus of Carnegie Mellon University in Pittsburgh, Pennsylvania, United States. Another copy is installed in front of the Kiturami Homsys Co. building in Hwagok-dong, Gangseo-gu, Seoul, South Korea.

The seven-ton work depicts a little girl, a businesswoman, a young man, and several others scaling a soaring 100-foot-tall stainless steel pole. Three people are looking upward from the base of the pole, which points to the east at a 75-degree angle.

A similar work by Borofsky, entitled "Woman Walking to the Sky", is installed in the center of Strasbourg, France, near the memorial for the synagogue that was destroyed by the Nazi occupiers of the city in 1940.

The piece was inspired by a story that Borofsky's father used to tell him when he was a child about a friendly giant who lived in the sky. In each tale, father and son would travel up to the sky to talk to the giant about what needed to be done for everyone back on earth. The artist says the sculpture is "a celebration of the human potential for discovering who we are and where we need to go."

== Carnegie Mellon University replica ==
Carnegie Mellon installed Walking to the Sky in May 2006 on its campus in front of Warner Hall just off Forbes Avenue. The sculpture was a gift from CMU Trustee Jill Gansman Kraus (A'74) and her husband, Peter Kraus, of New York City. The sculpture generated controversy among the student body for its appearance, the choice of location, and the lack of campus involvement in selecting and siting the piece. The campus newspaper described it as "an eyesore" and "a huge phallus" while others have expressed displeasure at its location as one of the first things seen of the campus from Forbes Avenue. Due to apparent structural instability, the sculpture had to be replaced in October 2009.
