= Ergo Group =

German insurance group based in Düsseldorf

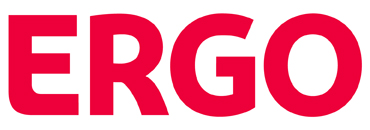

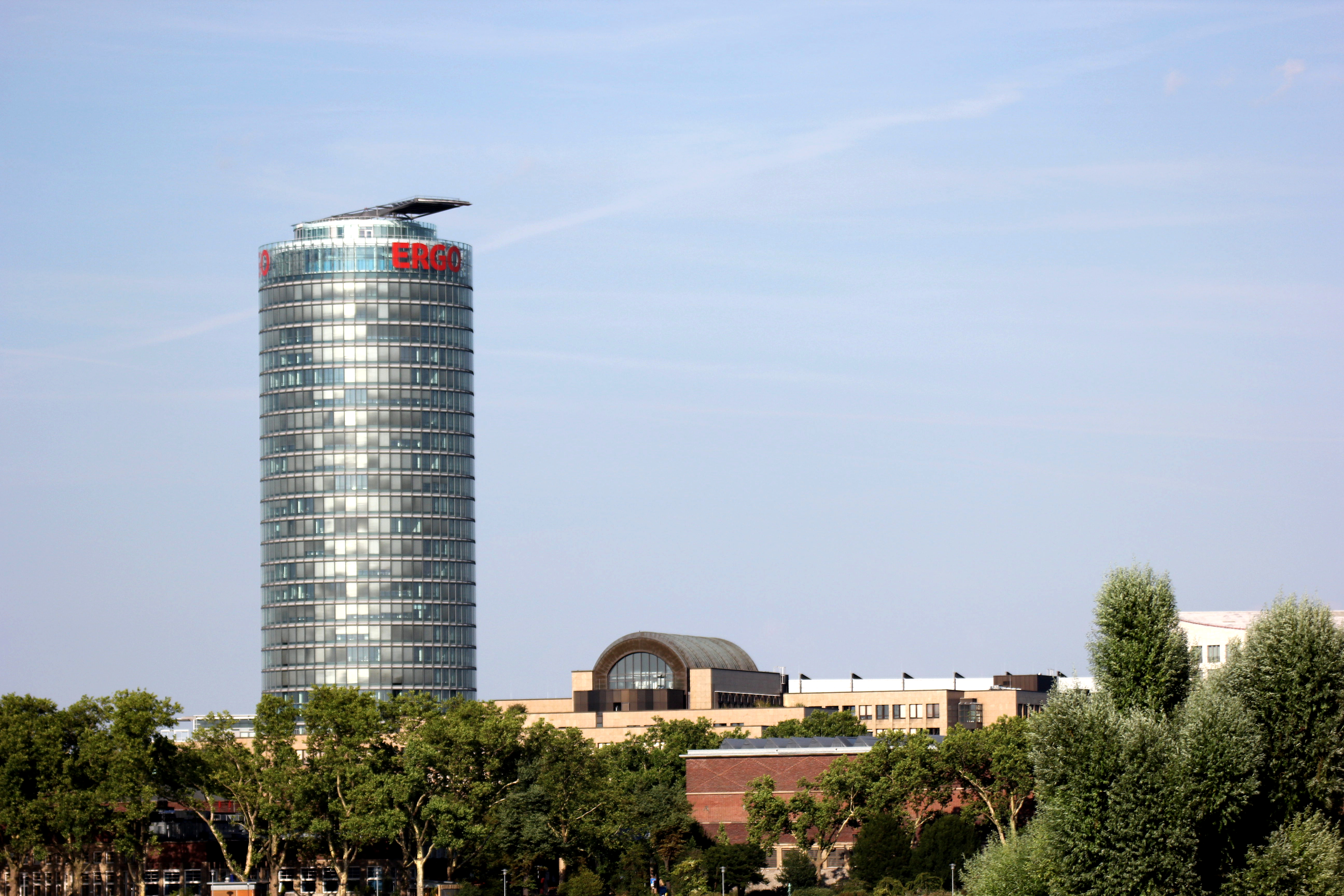
- Ergo Group’s headquarters, the Ergo Tower in Düsseldorf (photo: Sven Volkens)
- Type: Subsidiary
- Industry: Insurance
- Founded: 1997
- Headquarters: Düsseldorf, Germany
- Area served: Worldwide
- Key people: Dr. Markus Rieß (CEO); Dr. Christoph Jurecka (Chair of Supervisory Board)
- Revenue: €20.8 billion (2024)
- Number of employees: 37,000
- Website: www.ergo.com/en

Ergo Group AG (stylized as ERGO) is one of the leading international insurance groups and operates in over 20 countries worldwide. Based in Düsseldorf, Germany, the multi-line insurance company offers its retail and corporate customers a broad product portfolio in all the main classes of insurance – property and casualty (P&C), life and health insurance – as well as comprehensive assistance and other services. About 37,000 people work either as salaried employees or self-employed sales representatives for the Group. In the 2024 fiscal year, Ergo generated insurance revenue of 20.8 billion euros and a net result of 810 million euros. Ergo is part of Munich Re, one of the world’s leading reinsurers and risk carriers.

== History ==
In 1997, D.A.S., DKV Deutsche Krankenversicherung AG, Hamburg-Mannheimer and Victoria merged to establish Ergo Insurance Group. Then, in 2001, Munich Re became the sole owner of the group. In 2009, the travel insurance company Ergo Reiseversicherung and Austrian BA-CA Insurance were integrated, and in 2010, KarstadtQuelle Versicherungen, renamed Ergo Direkt Lebensversicherung AG. Since 2016, the company operates with a holding structure under Ergo Group AG.

== Organization ==
Three holding entities operate under the roof of Ergo Group: Ergo Deutschland AG, Ergo International AG and Ergo Technology & Services Management AG.

- Ergo Deutschland AG – Runs Ergo Group's business activities in its home market Germany. Its main operational subsidiaries include the P&C insurer Ergo Versicherung AG, the life insurance carrier Ergo Vorsorge Lebensversicherung AG, and the health insurance company DKV Deutsche Krankenversicherung AG.
- Ergo International AG – Manages Ergo Group's international business activities. As such, it oversees the company's operations in over 20 countries worldwide, focusing on Europe, Asia, and since 2025, the United States.
- Ergo Technology & Services Management AG – Is in charge of global management of IT and technology services for Ergo Group and its subsidiaries. Software, support services and digital infrastructure are organized and provided by three on-, near- and offshore hubs in Germany (Itergo Informationstechnologie GmbH), Poland (Ergo Technology & Services S.A.) and India (Ergo Technology & Services Pvt. Ltd.), respectively.

== International development ==
In addition to its activities in its home market Germany, Ergo Group has successively streamlined and expanded its international business since 2016. With operations spanning more than 20 countries worldwide, the company has been focussing on so-called core markets in Europe (Austria, Baltic States, Belgium, Greece, the Nordics, Poland and Spain) as well as selected growth markets in Asia (China, India, and Thailand). As part of this strategy, Ergo privileges organic growth while taking an opportunistic stance regarding possible acquisitions. In this context, Ergo Group has, amongst others, acquired Storebrand ASA's shares in its 50/50-Norwegian health insurance joint venture Storebrand Helseforsikring AS in 2024, making Ergo the company's sole owner. Following its rebranding to Ergo Forsikring AS in October 2024, Ergo Group has merged the company with its Danish travel insurance business Europaeiske Rejseforsikring A/S in 2025. Furthermore, Ergo has signed an agreement with Gjensidige Forsikring ASA in 2024 to acquire their non-life Lithuanian subsidiary ADB Gjensidige – including their branches in Estonia and Latvia. In 2025, Ergo Group has further expanded its international footprint by entering the US market with the full acquisition of Next Insurance.

== Acquisition of Next Insurance – entry into the US market ==
In 2025, Ergo Group fully acquired US insurer Next Insurance (stylized as NEXT). Through this transaction, the group entered the world's largest insurance market, tapping the US small and medium-sized businesses (SMB) segment. Founded in 2016 and headquartered in Palo Alto, California, Next insurance is a P&C insurer focusing on the specific needs of US small business owners. The company offers a digital "one-step" insurance experience with instant underwriting and policy issuance. Since its creation, Next Insurance has witnessed significant growth and generated a top line of $548 million in 2024. As of 2025, the company serves more than 600,000 customers and counts around 700 employees. Ergo and Munich Re have been closely accompanying Next Insurance since 2017. Prior to the afore-mentioned transaction, Ergo Group was already a major shareholder of Next insurance, holding around 29 percent of the company's outstanding share capital. Next Insurance was renamed Ergo Next Insurance in 2026.

== Management ==
The management of Ergo Group AG is overseen by a Board of Management, which has seven members and is responsible for the company's strategic direction and day-to-day operations. As of 2025, the CEO and Chairman of the Board of Management is Dr. Markus Rieß, who has held the position since 16 September 2015. The mandates of the other board members include Finance, Technology, Digitalization, Underwriting and Human Resources.

The Board of Management itself is overseen by a Supervisory Board, which monitors the former's conduct of business and advises the executive team on all matters of importance to the company. In doing so, the Supervisory Board contributes to the long-term development of Ergo Group. As of 2025, the Supervisory Board is chaired by Dr. Joachim Wenning, Chair of the Board of Management of Munich Re.

== Stock market presence ==
Ergo was publicly listed in the MDAX index until 2001. Following Munich Re’s full acquisition that year, Ergo ceased to have an independent stock market listing. Shares of Munich Re are traded on the Frankfurt Stock Exchange with the company being included in the DAX index, which represents the 40 largest German companies by market capitalization.

== Headquarters ==
Ergo Group AG is headquartered in Düsseldorf, Germany. The "Victoria-Haus" (also known as "Victoria Tower" or "Ergo Tower") and its adjacent buildings serve as the company's headquarters, located in Düsseldorf’s Pempelfort district. The cylindrical high-rise tower was constructed between 1994 and 1998 and stands approximately 108 meters tall with 29 floors above ground, making it the third tallest building in the city.

== Sponsorship ==
Ergo Group AG pursues a long-term, strategic sports sponsorship program. The company has been a partner of the DFB Cup, a national soccer cup competition organized annually by the German Football Association ("Deutscher Fußball-Bund", DFB), since 2016 and the "Official Insurance Partner of the German Football Association" since 2022. As such, Ergo is partner of the men’s, women’s, and under-21 national soccer teams and supports the DFB Academy as well as the amateur soccer portal Fussball.de. Moreover, Ergo is the title sponsor of the DFB-ePokal, an e-soccer cup competition for amateur and professional gamers. In 2024, the company also acted as an official national partner of UEFA Men's European Football Championship, commonly referred to as Uefa Euro 2024, which took place in Germany, and was presenting partner of the tournament’s volunteer program.

In terms of partnerships and sponsoring, Ergo Group AG is active on the local and international level as well, supporting different cultural, educative and sport institutions and initiatives on the ground and in the countries in which it operates.
