= Hammering Man =

Series of sculptures by Jonathan Borofsky

- Artist: Jonathan Borofsky
- Year: 1979–2002
- Type: Metal

Hammering Man is a series of monumental kinetic sculptures by Jonathan Borofsky. The two-dimensional painted steel sculptures were designed at different scales (from approximately 12 feet to 49 feet high), were painted black, and depict a man with a motorized arm and hammer movement to symbolize workers throughout the world. They were structurally engineered by Leslie E. Robertson Associates (LERA).

Borofsky has stated that "The Hammering Man is a worker. The Hammering Man celebrates the worker. He or she is the village craftsman, the South African coal miner, the computer operator, the farmer or the aerospace worker - the people who produce the commodities on which we depend."

== Installations ==
Models of various sizes in the series have been installed in public spaces and museums throughout the United States and Europe, with the first 3.4 m (11.5 ft) high wood model shown at the Paula Cooper Gallery. The largest model reaches approximately 21 metres (69 ft), mid-size models at approximately 15 m (49 ft) and at 7 m (23 ft).

=== Seoul ===
The largest Hammering Man is in Seoul, South Korea (37°34′11.67″N 126°58′20.85″E) next to the Heungkuk Life Insurance building in the Gwanghwamun area of the city. Installed in 2002, it stands 22 m (72 ft) high and weighs 50 tons. Seoul's Hammering Man strikes a blow every minute and seventeen seconds and is considered an important city landmark. In August 2009, the city of Seoul completed a project to move the sculpture 4.8 m/16 ft closer to the sidewalk and dedicated a new small gallery park at the site. A spiral path surrounding the statue was created to enhance its presence. Specially designed benches, landscaping, and lighting were also added to the surrounding park.

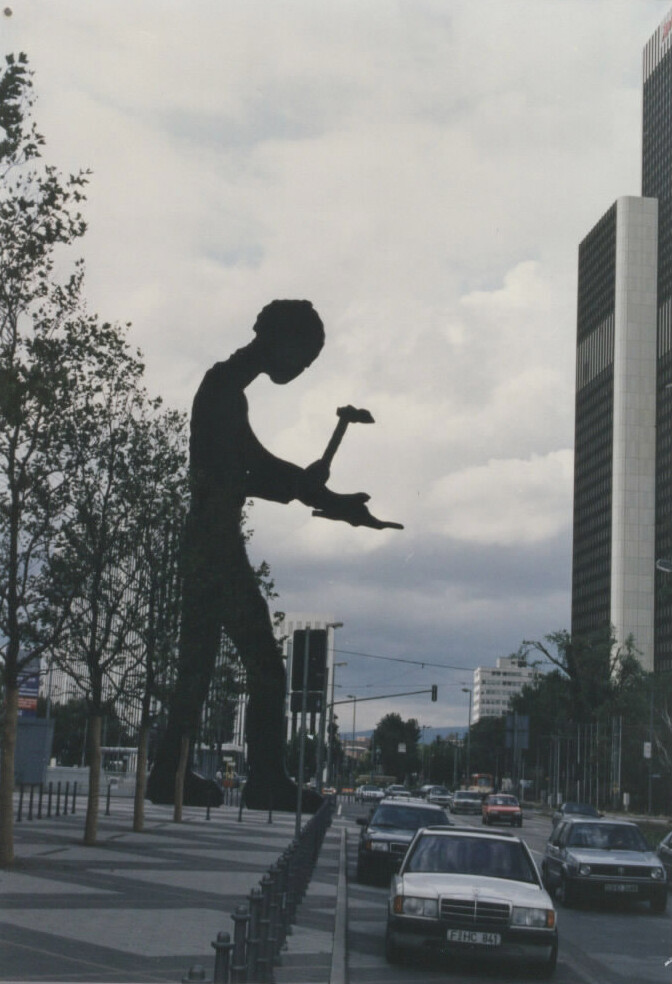
Hammering Man in Frankfurt am Main.

=== Frankfurt ===
The Hammering Man sculpture in Frankfurt, Germany is 21 metres (68.9 ft) tall and was commissioned in 1990, for the new Messeturm (exhibition tower) building at the Frankfurt Trade Fair (50°06′45″N 8°39′10″E). An unofficial 6 ft tall copy of the Hammering Man appeared in Frankfurt in the 1990s in the Hülya-Platz (in the district Bockenheim, 50°7′25.29″N 8°38′23.00″E). It was donated by a citizen's group against neo-nazism to commemorate the Solingen arson attack of 1993, and its hammer was designed with a hand crank that demolished a swastika emblem. This stealth sculpture was often vandalized and in April 2007 it was removed and scrapped after becoming so badly damaged and corroded that it was considered a danger for public safety. It was later replaced by a successor.

=== Seattle ===
The Seattle Hammering Man in 2009.

The Hammering Man sculpture in Seattle is 14.6 m (48 feet) tall, 76 cm (30 inches) wide and 18 cm (7 inches) deep, and weighs 26,000 pounds. It is located directly in front of the Seattle Art Museum (47°36′25.31″N 122°20′17.20″W) and is made from hollow-fabricated steel with a mechanized aluminum arm, an electric motor and flat black automotive paint. It was built in 1991 at a cost of $450,000. Original funding was provided by the Virginia Wright Fund in honor of Prentice Bloedel; City of Seattle 1% for Art funds; the Museum Development Authority and PONCHO (Patrons of Northwest Civic, Cultural and Charitable Organizations). However, during installation on 28 September 1991, the first sculpture fell and had to be replaced. The replaced sculpture was fabricated by Lippincott, Inc., North Haven, Connecticut and installed by Fabrication Specialities, Seattle. Its arm "hammers" silently and smoothly four times per minute, 20 hours a day, and runs on a 3-hp electric motor set on an automatic timer. The Hammering Man sculpture's arm rests 1–5 a.m. each morning as well as every year on Labor Day. On Labor Day 1993, a group of local artists led by Jason Sprinkle attached a scaled-to-fit ball and chain to the sculpture's leg.

Borofsky's statement on the Seattle installation: "The Hammering Man is a worker. The Hammering Man celebrates the worker. He or she is the village craftsman, the South African coal miner, the computer operator, the farmer or the aerospace worker-the people who produce the commodities on which we depend. This Hammering Man is 48 feet tall. It is constructed of steel (hollow-fabricated) and weighs over 20,000 pounds. A structural steel base-plate is bolted to a cement-block footing below ground level so that the architect's chosen material for the plaza can be brought up to flush to the feet of the sculpture. The Hammering Man appears to be standing (and working) on the plaza without a base in between. The black silhouette of the figure is, in fact, 30 inches wide: body (10 inches), arm (10 inches), space between arm and body (10 inches), as well as an extra 16 inches width at the top for the motor. The motorized hammering arm will move smoothly and meditatively up and down at a rate of four times per minute. Electricity runs from the motor down inside the sculpture and under the plaza to an on-off switch location. The Hammering Man is set on a timer and rests during evening and early morning hours. The sculpture has been sited so that the many pedestrians and drivers moving up and down First Avenue can enjoy the animated form while contemplating the meaning of the Hammering Man in their own lives."

"This sculpture is the second largest Hammering Man on the planet. A taller version is in Frankfurt, Germany. My goal is to have several different Hammering Men placed around the world-all working simultaneously. Other big outdoor versions of this work are in Japan and Switzerland. In the U.S. there are Hammering Men sculptures in New York, Minneapolis, Los Angeles and Washington D.C., among other places. It's a concept which helps to connect all of us together and also gives each specific Hammering Man site the potential for its own personal interpretations. The State of Washington is known for its aerospace, electronics, timber, fishing, agriculture, and gold mining industries-people working with their hands, or manual labor. Let this sculpture be a symbol for all the people of Seattle working with others on the planet to create a happier and more enlightened humanity."

"I want this work to communicate to all the people of Seattle-not just the artists, but families, young and old. I would hope that children who see the Hammering Man at work would connect their delight with the potential mysteries that a museum could offer them in their future. At its heart, society reveres the worker. The Hammering Man is the worker in all of us. Jonathan Borofsky (Spring 2002)

=== Full list of locations ===
==== United States ====
- Dallas, Texas: 24 ft (1985)
- Public Plaza, 110 E. Ninth Street, South Park, Los Angeles, California: 22 ft (1988)
- La Jolla, California (1988)
- Seattle Art Museum, Seattle, Washington: 48 ft (1991)
- New York, New York (1981)
- Minneapolis, Minnesota (1984, no longer on display)
- Gainesville, Florida (date unknown)

==== Europe ====
- Basel, Switzerland: 44 ft (1989)
- Frankfurt, Germany: 70 ft (1990)
- Lillestrøm, Norway (2010) 12 meters high.

==== Asia ====
- Seoul, Korea: 72 ft (2002)
