= Main Street (Santa Monica, California) =

Street in Santa Monica, California, USA

- Maintained by: Local city jurisdictions
- Location: Venice, Los Angeles and Santa Monica, California, United States
- Southeast end: Venice Boulevard in Venice, Los Angeles
- Northwest end: 2nd Street in Santa Monica

Main Street, from the intersections of Strand to Rose streets, mostly in Santa Monica, California, but also in the Venice neighborhood in the City of Los Angeles, from Strand to Rose is a popular upscale shopping district on the Westside of Los Angeles.

Santa Monica promotes the strip as having a "very local, surfer vibe to it, and that continues with its shopping offerings". DX Top 10 Guides characterizes the shops and cafés as "fun", "sophisticated", and "eclectic". The 1980s marked the "makeover" of the street and its start as a trendy destination for locals and visitors.

The street is the hub of the Ocean Park neighborhood which has a distinct historical identity.

== Architecture ==
There are two buildings designed by Frank Gehry, the Chiat-Day and Edgemoor buildings. Sculpture artist Jonathan Borofsky's Ballerina Clown decorates a building at the corner of Rose.

== Gallery ==
Ballerina Clown by Jonathan Borofsky

Parkhurst Building, Main St., Santa Monica

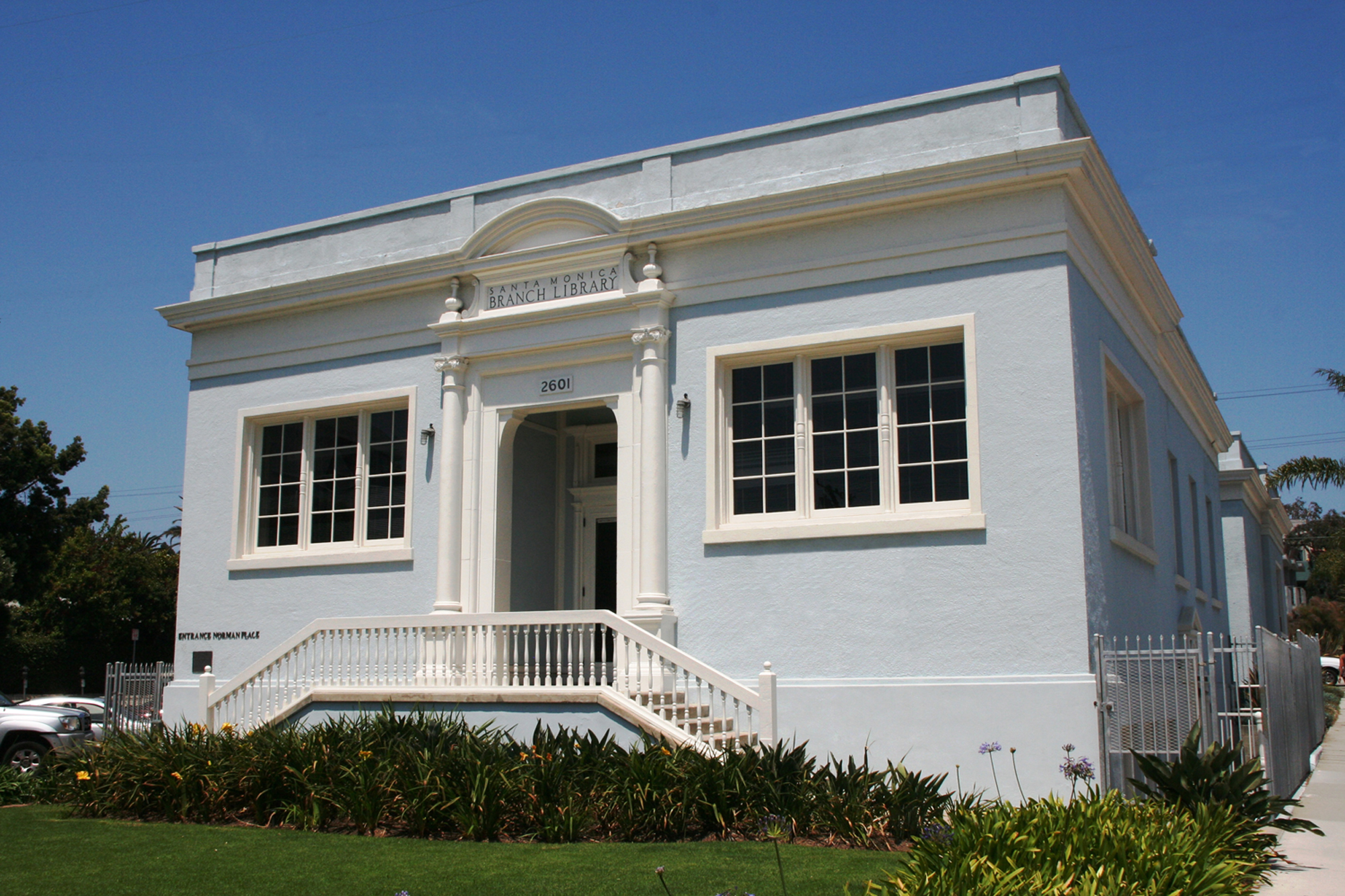
Ocean Park Branch Library, Main Street Santa Monica
