= Jonathan Borofsky =

American sculptor and printmaker

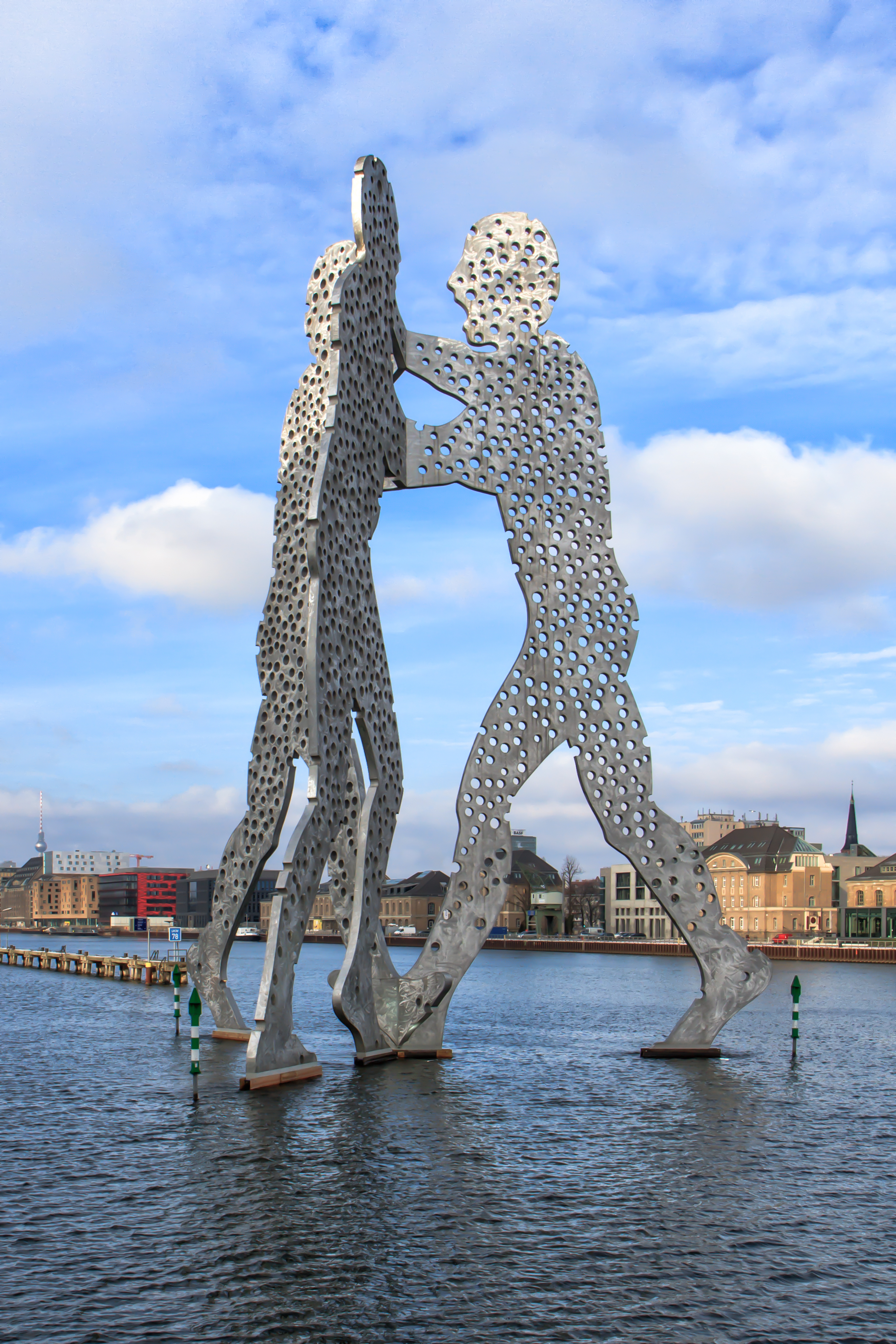
- Molecule Man, Berlin
- Born: December 24, 1942 (age 83); Boston, Massachusetts, US
- Education: Carnegie Mellon University; Yale University
- Known for: Painting, Sculpture, Installation art

Jonathan Borofsky (born December 24, 1942) is an American sculptor and printmaker who lives and works in Ogunquit, Maine.

== Early life and education ==
Borofsky was born in Boston, Massachusetts. He received his Bachelor of Fine Arts at Carnegie Mellon University in 1964, after which he continued his studies at France's Ecole de Fontainebleau and received his Master of Fine Arts from Yale University in 1966. He lived in Manhattan until a teaching position at the California Institute of the Arts brought him to Los Angeles in 1977. He resided in Venice and Tuna Canyon, Los Angeles from 1977 to 1992, In the 1960s, Borofsky's art sought to interconnect minimalism and pop art.

On May 21, 2006, Borofsky received an honorary doctorate in Fine Arts from Carnegie Mellon, his alma mater.

== Works ==
Jonathan Borofsky's most famous works, at least among the general public, are his Hammering Man public art sculptures. Hammering Man has been installed in various cities around the world. The largest Hammering Man is in Seoul, Korea and the second largest is in Frankfurt, Germany. Other Hammering Man sculptures are in Basel, Switzerland, Yorkshire Sculpture Park, Dallas, Denver, Los Angeles, Minneapolis, New York City, Seattle, Gainesville, FL, Washington, D.C., and Lillestrøm, Norway.

In 1989 developer Harlan Lee commissioned Borofsky's 30-foot-tall Ballerina Clown, a building-mounted kinetic aluminum, steel and fiberglass public art sculpture for a mixed use residential and commercial building in Venice, California in 1989. The clown sculpture's right leg was motorized with a kicking motion. Tenant complaints followed about the sculpture's mechanical noise and after years of in-operation the kinetic leg component was restored in 2014 to move only intermittently. Another Ballerina Clown was installed in the Ludwig Forum für Internationale Kunst in Aachen, Germany. This version dates from 1991 and was part of the Metropolis exhibition at Gropiusbau Berlin that year.

In 1990, the Newport Harbor Art Museum commissioned Ruby, a 5-foot-tall plastic sculpture containing an internal lighting system and swaying, diamond-shaped light deflectors.

Between 1989 and 1999, Borofsky completed a series of Molecule Man public art sculptures consisting of three connected perforated aluminum sheets, ranging in height from 11 feet to 100 feet. Three of his 100-foot Molecule Man sculptures were set directly into the Spree River in Berlin as a commission for German insurance company Allianz.

In 2004, the Municipal Art Society of Baltimore commissioned Jonathan Borofsky to create his 51-foot (15.5 m) Male/Female aluminum sculpture as the centerpiece of a re-designed plaza in front of Penn Station to celebrate its 100th anniversary. The sculpture was a gift to the city from the Society. A smaller version of Male/Female is located at the Frederik Meijer Gardens & Sculpture Park and stands approximately 23 feet (7 m) tall.

In May 2006, Borofsky's Walking to the Sky was permanently installed on the campus of Carnegie Mellon University near the intersection of Forbes Avenue and Morewood Avenue in Pittsburgh. The piece was temporarily installed at Rockefeller Center during the fall of 2004 and in 2005 at the Nasher Sculpture Center in Dallas, Texas.

== Major permanent commissions ==
- Walking to the Sky – 2006, Pittsburgh, Pennsylvania
- Male/Female – 2004, Baltimore, Maryland
- Freedom: Male/Female – 1997, Friends-of-the-Constitution Square, Offenburg, Germany
- Walking Man – 1995, Munich, Germany
- Ballerina Clown – 1991, Aachen, Germany
- Ballerina Clown – 1989, Venice, Los Angeles
- Molecule Man – 1981, Little Tokyo, Los Angeles

== Selected exhibitions ==
- 2004 – Rockefeller Center, New York City
- 2002 – Fondazione Sandretto Re Rebaudengo, Cuneo, Italy
- 1999 – Kunstmuseum Basel; Remba Gallery, Los Angeles
- 1996 – Whitney Museum of American Art, New York City
- 1992 – Documenta 9, Kassel
- 1987 – Documenta 8, Kassel
- 1985 – Berkeley Art Museum, Berkeley, California
- 1984 – Philadelphia Museum of Art, Philadelphia, Pennsylvania
- 1984 – Stadel, Frankfurt
- 1982 – Documenta 7, Kassel
- 1981 – Contemporary Arts Museum, Houston, Texas

== Gallery ==
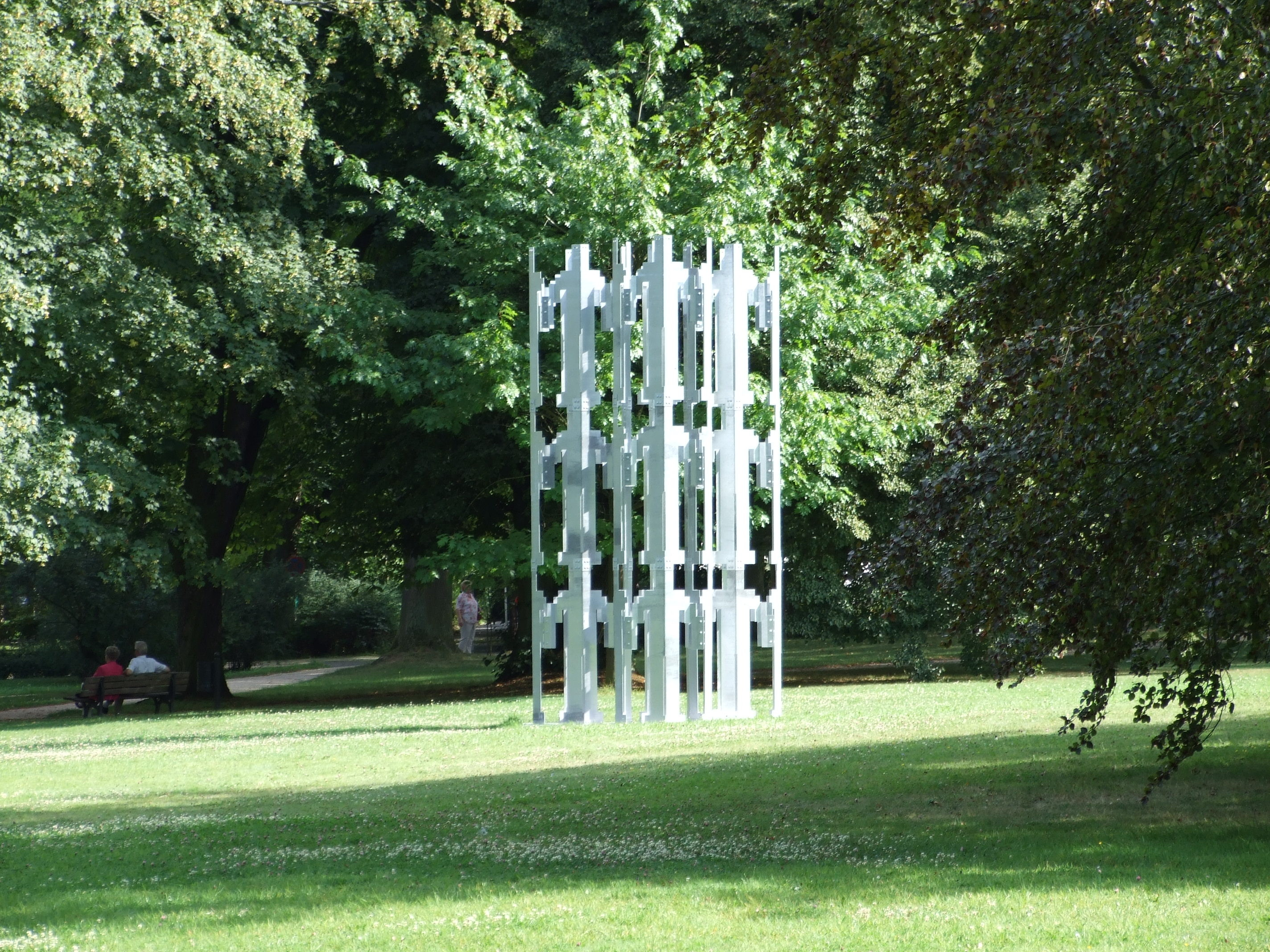
Human Structures at "blickachsen 7", 2009

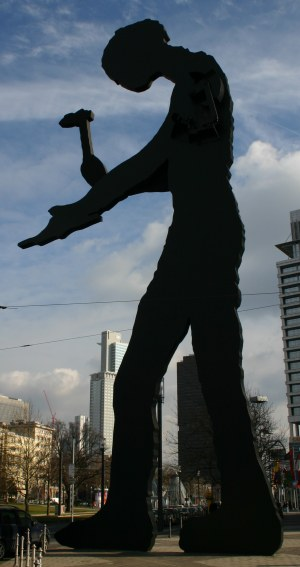
Hammering Man in Frankfurt

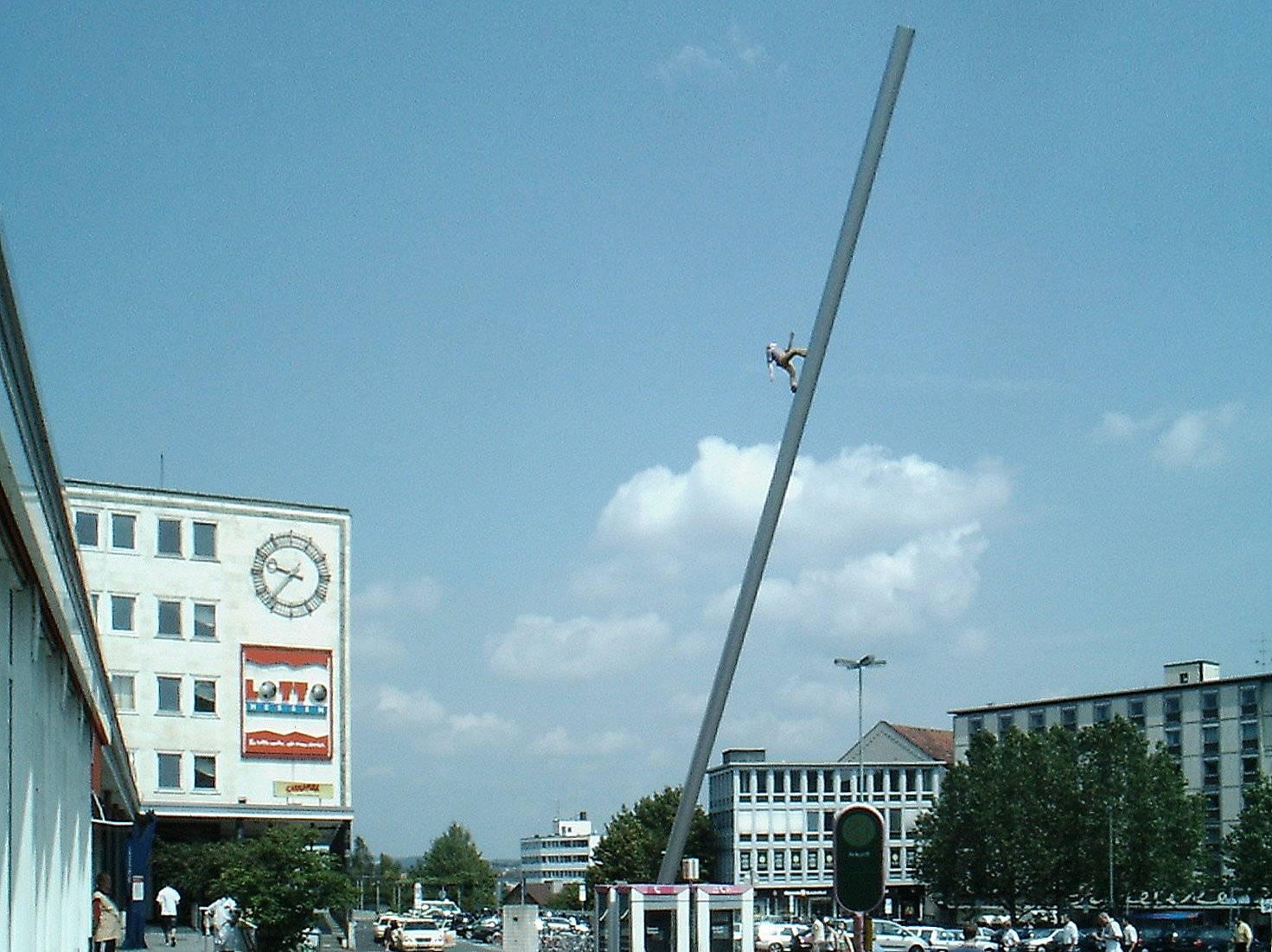
Man walking to the sky, Kassel

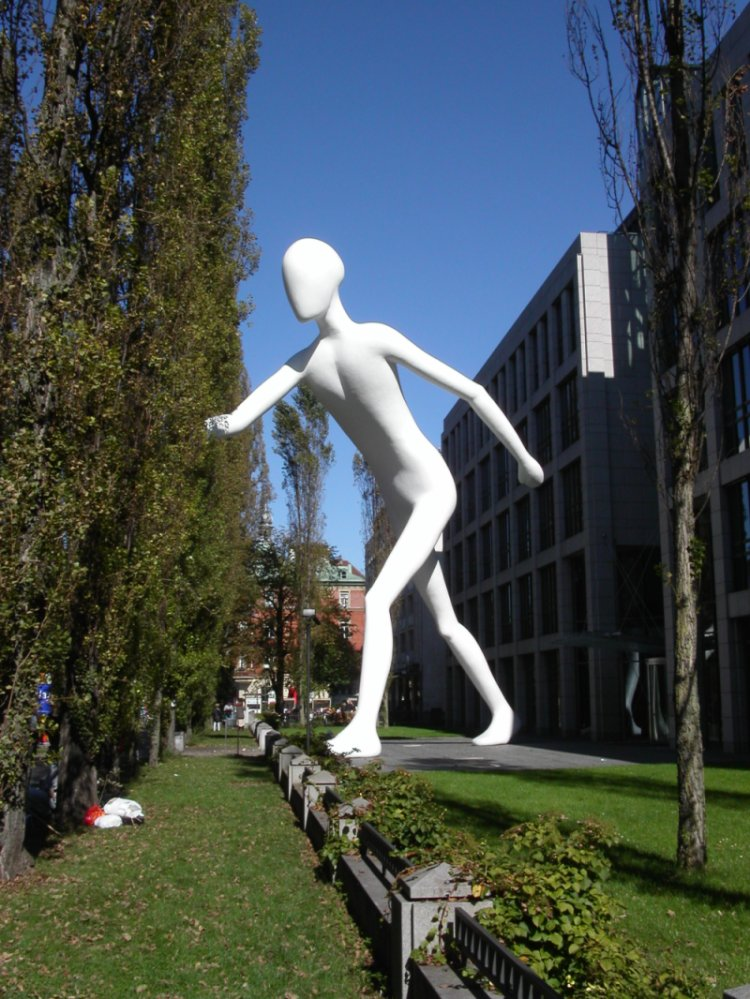
Walking Man in Munich (Munich Re)

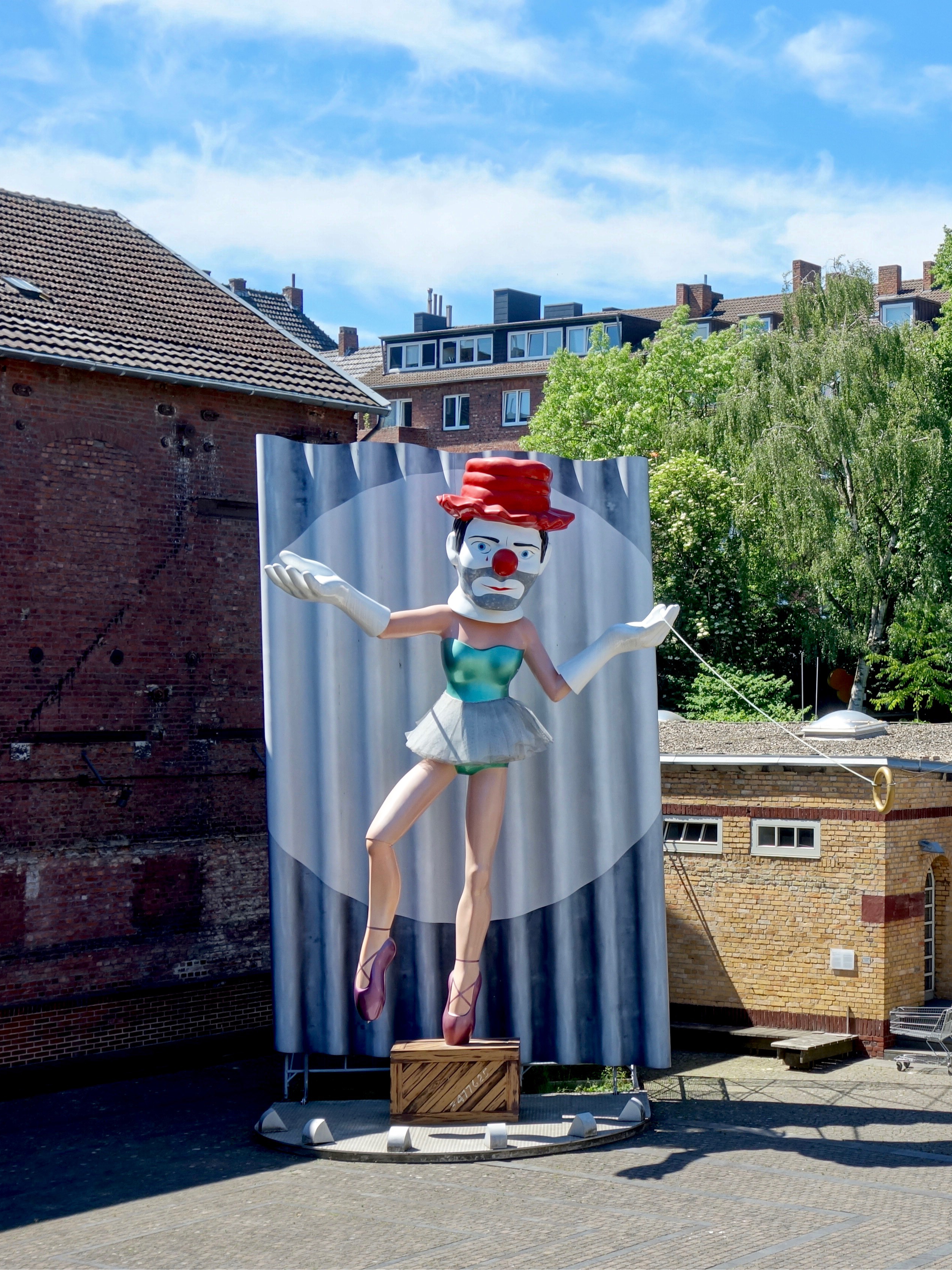
Ballerina Clown at the Ludwig Forum für Internationale Kunst in Aachen
