= Bill Clapp =

American business executive and philanthropist (1941–2026)

William H. Clapp (November 9, 1941 – May 29, 2026) was an American business executive and philanthropist who was the founder and chairman of the Matthew G. Norton Company, a property management firm based in Seattle. He was also the founder, along with his wife Paula, of Global Partnerships, Global Washington, and Seattle International Foundation.

== Early life and career ==
Clapp was the great-grand son of Weyerhaeuser Co. co-founder Matthew Norton. He began his career in Alaska in the 1960s, working as a bush pilot and businessman. He returned to Seattle in 1975, where he helped found the Matthew G. Norton Company, a real estate and property management firm. Clapp served as CEO and chairman until 2002.

== Philanthropy ==
=== Global Partnerships ===
Clapp and his wife, Paula, became interested in philanthropy and international development in the 1990s, after visiting a microlending program in El Salvador. In 1994, they founded Global Partnerships, a microlender with partner organizations in Central and South America, the Caribbean and Africa. Since its founding, the organization has provided loans and grants totalling $300 million to more than 10 million people. Clapp served as Executive Director of the organization until 2006.

=== Initiative for Global Development ===
In 2002, Clapp joined a group of policymakers, government officials, and philanthropists, including William H. Gates Sr., former U.S. senator Daniel J. Evans, former EPA administrator William D. Ruckelshaus, and former chairman of the Joint Chiefs of Staff General John Shalikashvili, in founding the Initiative for Global Development. The Washington, D.C.–based organization invests in small businesses in Africa.

=== Global Washington ===
Clapp founded Global Washington in 2008, and served as the organization's first chairman.

=== Seattle International Foundation ===
In 2008, Clapp and his wife founded the Seattle International Foundation (SIF), a grant-making organization with a strategic focus on Central America. Since its founding, SIF has issued grants totaling $20 million to 243 organizations. In addition, it partners with such organizations as the Seattle Foundation and Global Washington to enhance international philanthropy efforts originating in the Pacific Northwest.

== Death ==
Clapp died from complications of pneumonia on May 29, 2026, at the age of 84.
