= Westlake Center =

Mixed-use in Seattle, Washington, U.S.

Coordinates: 47°36′42″N 122°20′14″W

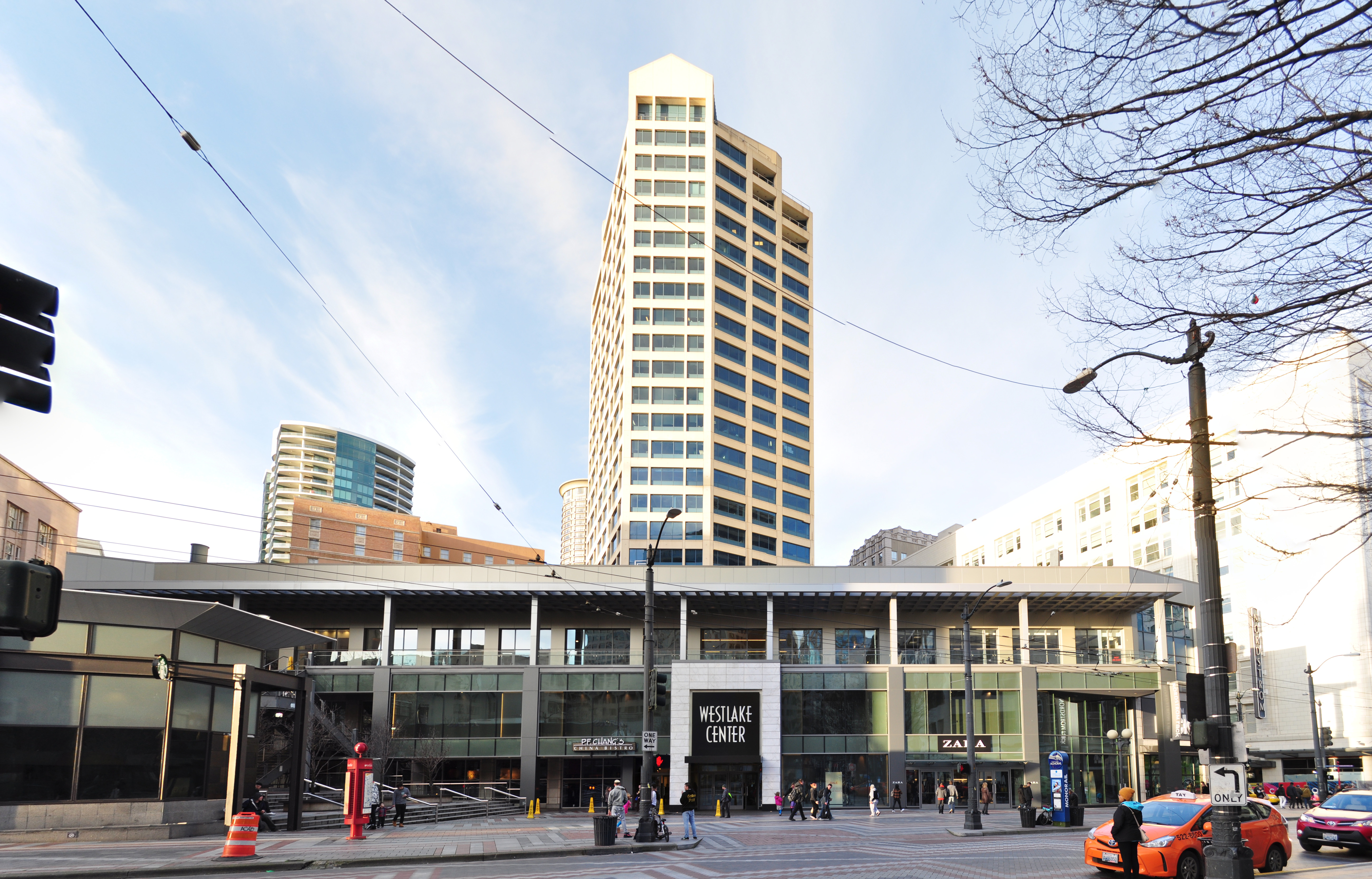
- Pine Street view after renovations (January 2016)
- Location: Seattle, Washington, United States
- Address: 400 Pine St, 98101 (shopping mall); 1601 5th Ave, 98101 (Westlake Tower)
- Opened: October 20, 1988; 38 years ago
- Renovated: Late 1990s; 2012; 2014; 2017
- Developer: The Rouse Company; Koehler-McFadyen
- Manager: GGP (Westlake Center); MetLife Investment Management and JLL Properties (Westlake Tower)
- Owner: GGP (Westlake Center); MetLife, Inc. (Westlake Tower)
- Architect: Callison Partnership; RTKL Associates; Brandston Partnership
- Num. of stores: 19 (82 at peak)
- Num. of anchor tenants: 2 (1 vacant, 1 planning to relocate)
- Floor area: 102,706 square feet (9,500 m^{2}) (retail); 370,000 square feet (34,000 m^{2}) (office)
- Floors: 4 (shopping mall); 25 (Westlake Tower)
- Parking: Parking lot with 300 paid spaces
- Website: westlakecenter.com
- Building details
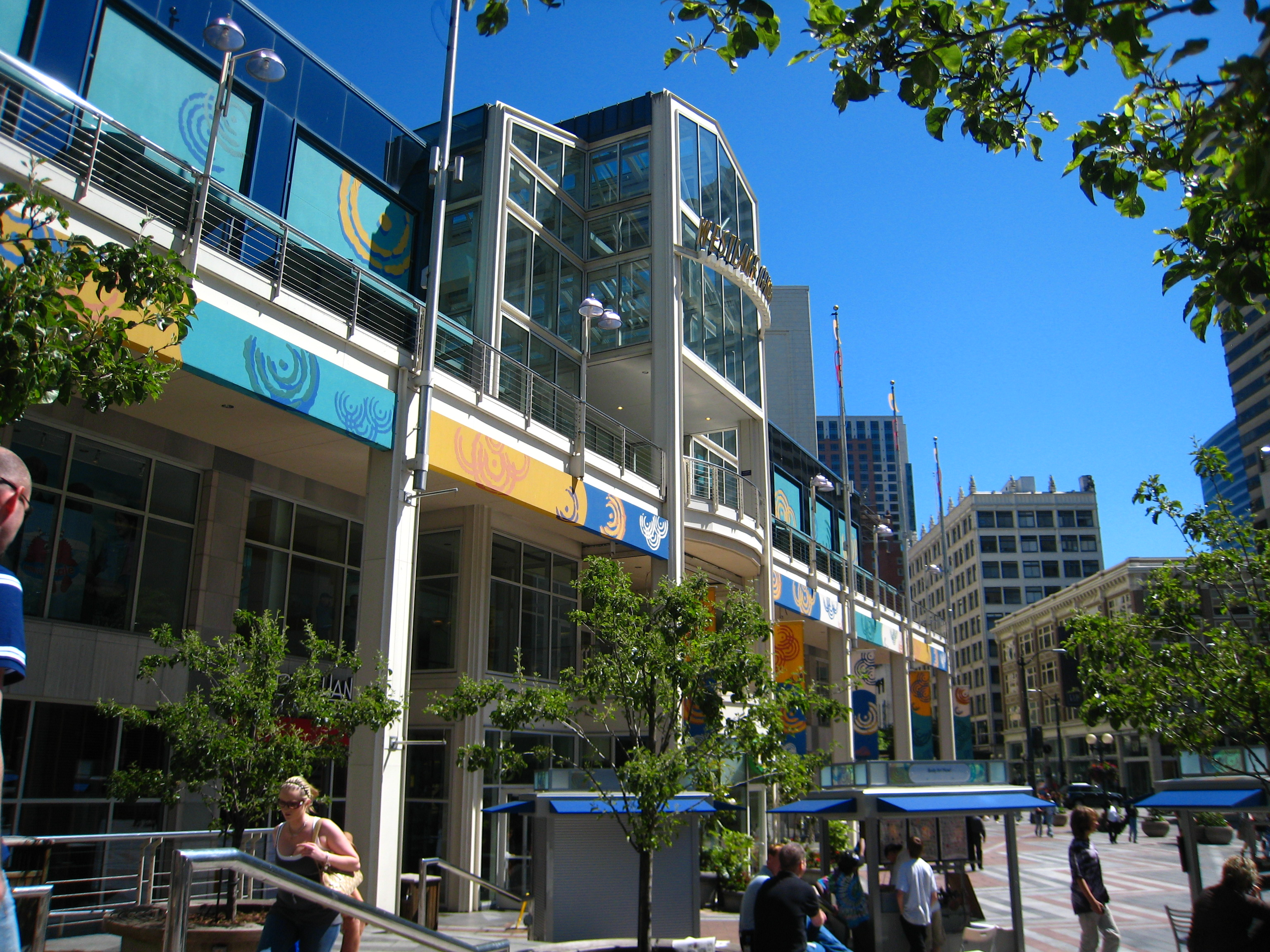
- Main entrance prior to renovations (June 2008)

General information
- Status: Operational
- Type: Mixed-use
- Construction started: September 1, 1986; 40 years ago
- Completed: 1988

Design and construction
- Main contractor: Howard S. Wright Construction Company

Renovating team
- Architect: Callison
- Renovating firm: The Rouse Co. (late 1990s); General Growth Properties (2012, 2014, and 2017)

Westlake Center is a mixed-use development in downtown Seattle, Washington, consisting of a four-story regional mall of the same name, and a 25-story office building known as Westlake Tower. The complex is located across Pine Street from Westlake Park, between 4th and 5th Avenues and is named for Westlake Avenue. Westlake Park is considered Seattle's "town square" and celebrities and political figures once made appearances or give speeches from the building's balcony.

Westlake Center is the southern terminus of the Seattle Center Monorail, which occupies part of the third floor. The anchor stores were Saks Off 5th and Nordstrom Rack. The retail space totals 870 sq ft (81 m^{2}). However, Saks closed in July 2024, and Nordstrom Rack is planning to relocate. As of 2026, Westlake Center has been fundamentally altered from a traditional shopping mall for community gatherings into a luxury center. It has fallen into dead mall status, dropping from 82 stores to just 19, though it does include a flagship Zara. One of the mall's food courts, the Asean Streat Food Hall, closed permanently on February 13, 2026, further affecting foot traffic.

== Overview ==
As of February 2026, the mall has one food court: the Bites on Pine food hall on the second floor.

The monorail terminal is located on the third floor. The mall's main food court, Westlake Cafes, was also on the third floor until a remodel in 2017 replaced it with a Saks Off 5th store. Westlake Center was originally designed to have four-story corridors, though several renovations initiated by Brookfield Properties (and its predecessor, General Growth Properties (GGP)) heavily altered this layout. Surrounding the mall and park, Seattle's main shopping district draws scores of both locals and visitors (the Washington State Convention and Trade Center is located in this district). To the west of Westlake Center is the (now-closed) main store for Macy's Northwest (previously the flagship store and corporate headquarters for The Bon Marché). To the east is the flagship Nordstrom store and corporate headquarters (previously the flagship store of Frederick & Nelson). In the surrounding area are locations for various major retailers and restaurant chains.

Seattle's version of the Macy's Thanksgiving Day Parade is located in this area. Also, many stores were vandalized during the WTO Ministerial Conference of 1999, during which massive protests occurred in downtown Seattle. It was also the site of the Occupy Seattle protest, which was a solidarity demonstration for Occupy Wall Street. Westlake Center is a public transportation hub for Seattle, serving as a terminus for the Seattle Center Monorail and the South Lake Union Streetcar. Underneath the mall is the Downtown Seattle Transit Tunnel which houses several stops on Sound Transit's Link light rail line.

== History ==
=== Background ===
==== The "original Westlake Center" (1950–1986) ====
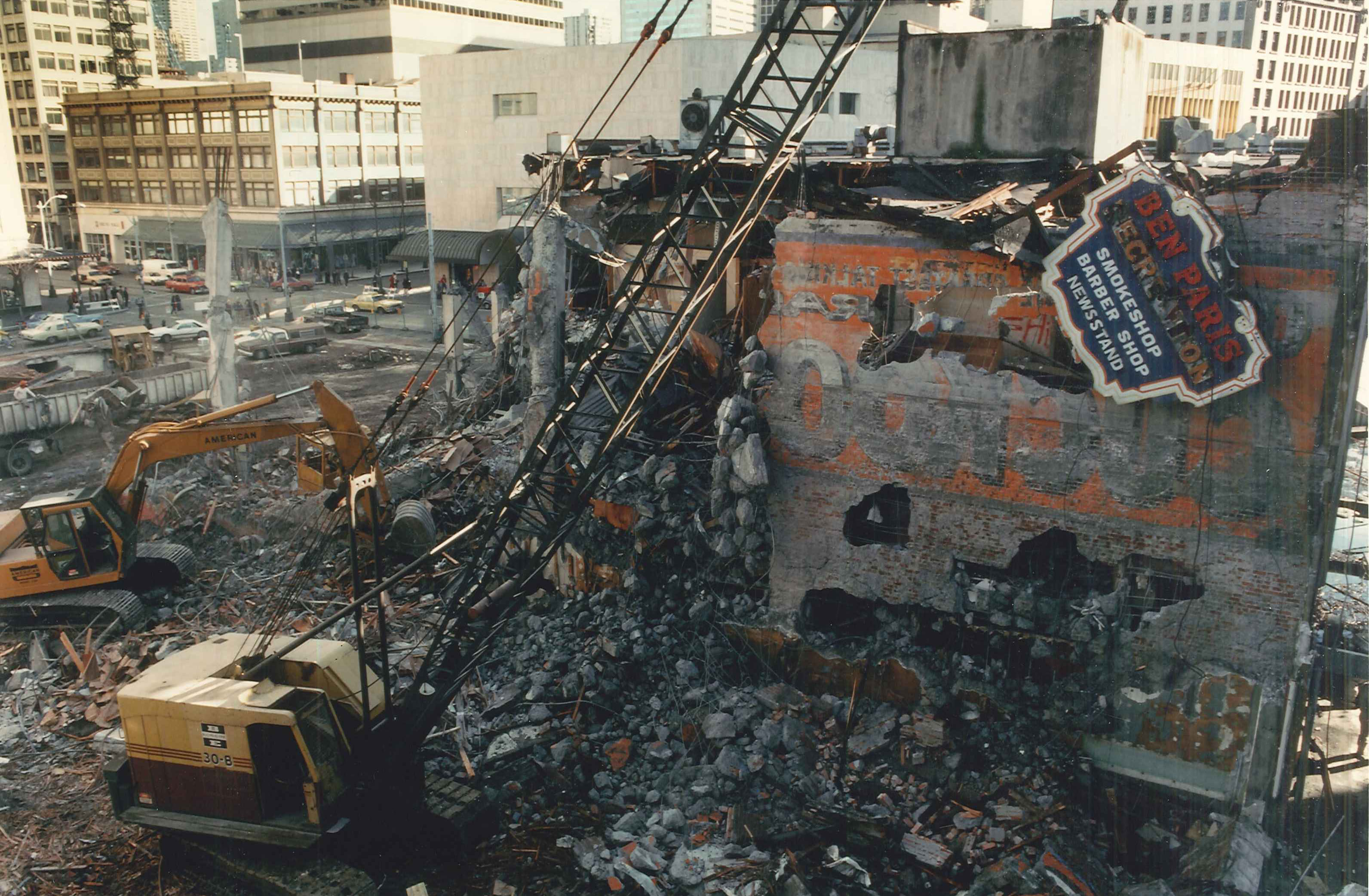
Demolition of the original Westlake Center in 1987

The original Westlake Center was an open pedestrianized area that served as the southern terminus for the Seattle Center Monorail and a central hub for community events. It also included the Westlake Terminal.

In the 1950s, the southernmost block of Westlake Avenue (between Pike and Pine) was closed to vehicular traffic to create a pedestrian mall. Despite many proposals being shown, no development took place in the area until the early 1960s when a large portion of the site was used as the southern monorail terminal during the 1962 Seattle World's Fair to transport visitors from downtown Seattle to the fairgrounds. The original Westlake Center opened on March 24, 1962, along with the Seattle Center Monorail. After opening, it was colloquially known as "Westlake Mall", and was designed by Adrian Wilson and Associates. The terminal was an elevated platform located over Pine Street at Westlake Avenue. It featured a futuristic design with barrel-vault-shaped plastic roofs and was accessed by inclined moving sidewalks. The original Westlake Center essentially served as Seattle's "unofficial town center".

From the early 1960s until 1976, a massive, "slightly bug-eyed" bearded Santa Claus statue was erected in the mall every December.

=== 1968–2004: Development, opening, and early years ===
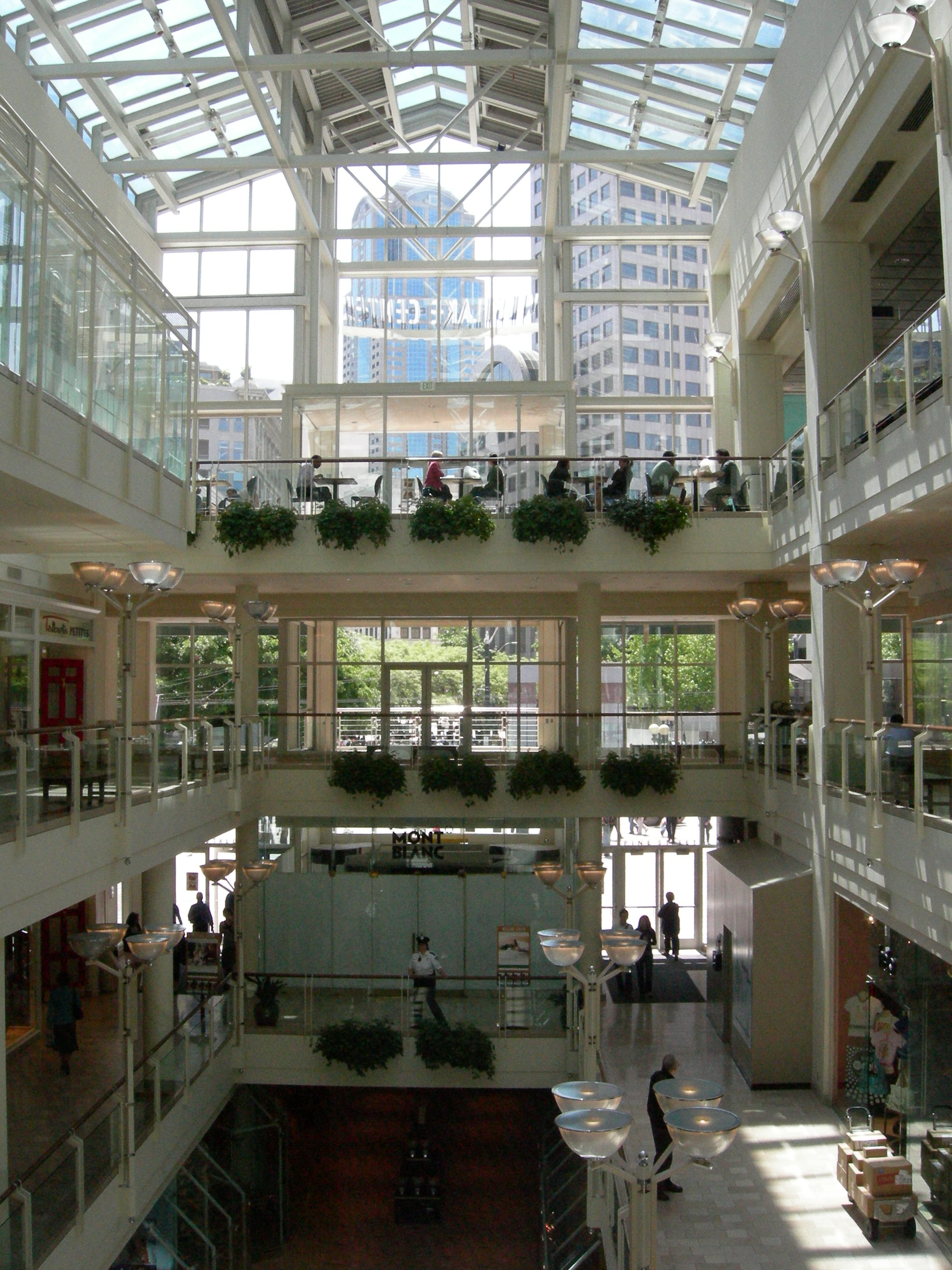
Central four-story atrium prior to renovations (June 2006)

On December 3, 1968, the Central Association unveiled its plan for Westlake Park in downtown Seattle, aiming to revitalize the surrounding area. The proposal envisions redeveloping one block between 4th and 5th Avenues and between Olive and Pine streets as commercial and retail space, and the closing of Pine Street to vehicular traffic. The Department of Community Development (DCD) was established in 1969, erecting the responsibilities of the City Planning Commission staff and the Urban Renewal Program, formerly an Executive Development division. The department was the city agency responsible for supporting the public and private efforts toward physical redevelopment and urban renewal in both the residential and business districts of Seattle.

A turning point occurred when a large portion of the DCD budget was identified from federal funds. This shift significantly affected DCD's operations focus, as certain types of federal funding declined and other funding programs were established. The administration of the Seattle Model City Program transitioned to DCD in 1970. However, funding ceased in 1974. In 1981, the Washington State Supreme Court ruled a previous plan unconstitutional. The court found the project was an improper "blend" of public and private development because the city used its power of eminent domain to acquire land for what was essentially a private retail mall. Following this, redevelopment on the Westlake area remained with discussions. Meanwhile, in 1983, Koehler-McFadyen of Seattle formed a joint venture with the Rouse Company of Columbia, Maryland. Their plan was to build a massive glass-enclosed retail pavilion and a commercial tower attached to it, similar to Rouse's Gallery at Harborplace.

However, construction was delayed when architect Victor Steinbrueck filed a lawsuit against the project, challenging the project's scale and potential to overshadow public spaces. Steinbrueck's lawsuit wasn't his first; he filed an initial lawsuit dating back to 1979 for similar reasons. The lawsuit was settled in 1984 when the Rouse Co. and Koehler-McFadyen altered their proposal, including the incorporation of an open plaza along Pine Street to preserve views and public access, but shaped in a more modest design, reflecting tensions between commercial interests and preservation advocates.

Both devs also agreed that they would develop the retail and commercial component of the project, while the city would handle construction of Westlake Park. Developer Steven Koehler was financed for construction of the mall, and RTKL Associates of Baltimore, local architect Callison, and Brandston Partnership, Inc. (BPI) were hired as the designers of the office tower and mall. The two devs formed the legal affiliate Rouse-Westlake Limited Partnership for the development of the mall. Rouse-Westlake itself was a division of Rouse-Seattle, LLC. Construction started when the original Westlake Center building and the Westlake Terminal were both demolished starting on September 1, 1986, which would require a complete reconstruction of the Seattle Center Monorail.

The new Westlake Center opened its doors on October 20, 1988. It had 82 tenant spaces, and a 25-story office building known as the Westlake Tower on its north side, with 340,000 square feet (32,000 m^{2}) of office space. Westlake Center underwent renovations in the late 1990s to add larger store spaces for new tenants in response to the opening of the Pacific Place shopping mall nearby. It was home to a small Neiman Marcus concept store called The Galleries of Neiman Marcus, which opened in 1999 and closed in early 2002.

In November 2004, Rouse and its portfolio, including Westlake Center, was acquired by General Growth Properties (GGP) of Chicago, Illinois, for $12.6 billion.

=== 2012–present: Decline and renovations ===
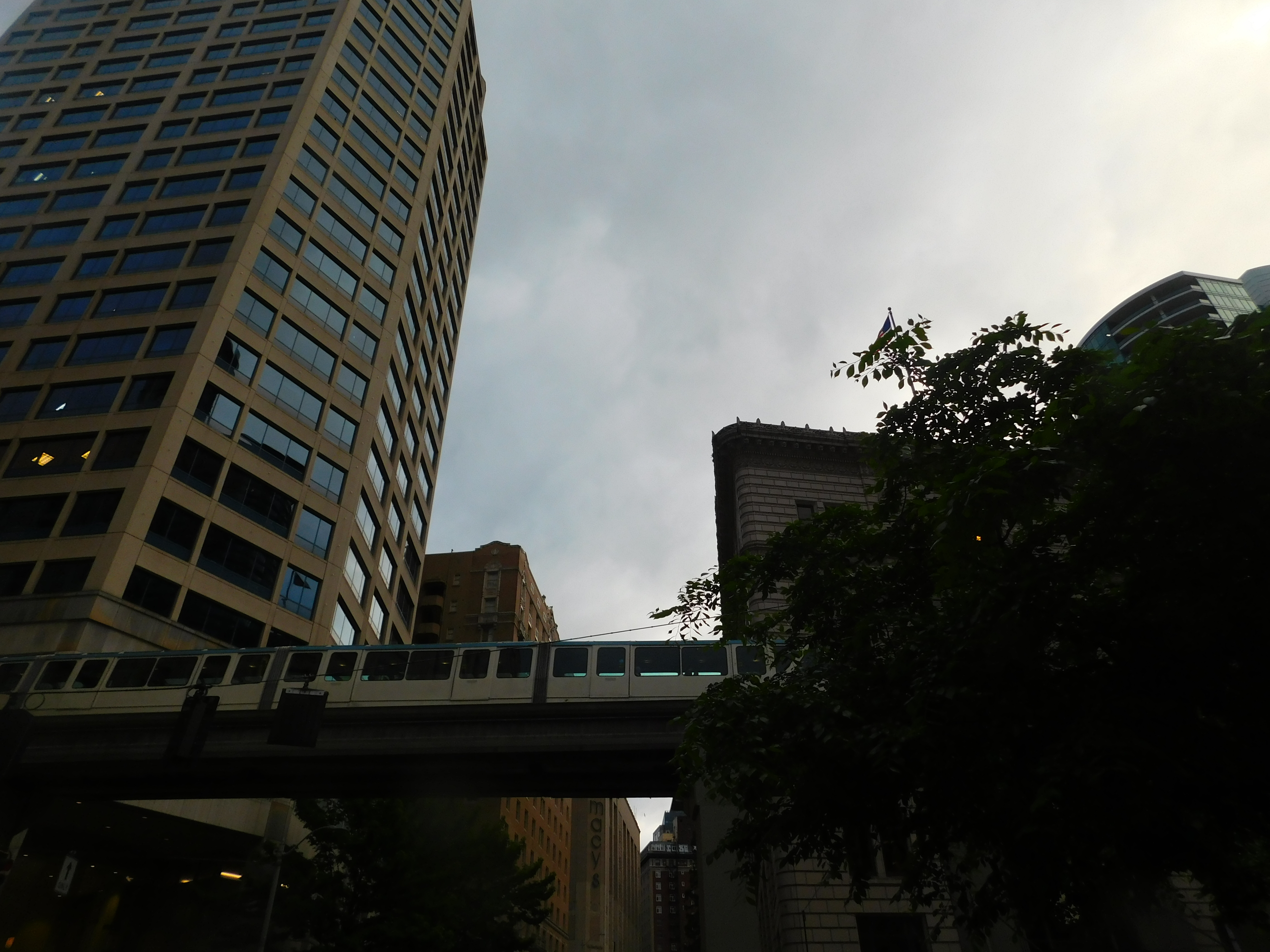
Westlake Tower (left), May 2017

Following a major renovation of the food court and common areas, Nordstrom Rack relocated from its longtime 2nd Avenue home into Westlake Center, opening its doors on March 15, 2012. This move was part of GGP's effort to make the mall as a discount luxury hub. Hundreds lined up for the store's grand opening.

When Westlake Center was renovated in between 2012 and 2014, GGP done extensive changes to the mall's original "festival marketplace" architecture, including removing greenery, and the third-floor balcony. New flooring, ceilings, and LED lighting systems were installed, as well as adding more escalators and removing the original ones. Callison designed the renovation, and executives of Callison explained that much of the construction was done at night to avoid interrupting business, requiring complex structural adjustments to the atrium to add new flooring for the revamped space.

Spanish fast-fashion chain Zara announced in February 2013 that it would open at Westlake Center in early 2014, and it would be the chain's first location in Seattle. It opened on February 6, 2014. On October 19, 2017, Saks Off 5th celebrated its grand opening, taking over 36,000 sq ft (3,300 m^{2}) of the mall's original food court. Alongside Nordstrom Rack, this created a dual-anchor strategy focused on off-price luxury.

In August 2018, GGP and its assets, including Westlake, was acquired by Brookfield Properties of New York for $15.3 billion. Brookfield sold Westlake Tower to Unico Properties in October 2019. As of then, tenants of the tower included Seattle Foundation, KPFF Consulting Engineers, Edelman, Affiliated Engineers, Global Washington, and WeWork.

During the COVID-19 pandemic and the 2022 to 2023 period, Westlake Center struggled with high vacancy rates and safety concerns. Tenants like Daiso and Clear Store Westlake were reported closed during this period, as foot traffic patterns shifted significantly. Its number of tenants gone from over 80 to over 20. The Asean Streat Food Hall opened in November 2022, housed inside the former P.F. Changs space. The food hall was designed to resemble Southeast Asian food hawker stands.

The Saks Off 5th store closed permanently in July 2024, leaving a massive empty space in Westlake Center. Saks Off 5th was the most visible tenant from the mall's entrance. Forever 21 shuttered because the company liquidated its U.S. assets in May 2025 after filing for Chapter 11 bankruptcy. In December 2025, Nordstrom Rack announced that it was closing its lower-level space in Westlake Center and moving into the former Forever 21 building at 601 Pine Street. They will relocate in spring 2027 to remain visible and assessable.

Unico then gave Westlake Tower back to its lenders, MetLife, Inc. in late January 2026 through a deed in lieu of foreclosure. The tower was reported to have a 33% vacancy rate later that month. Asean Streat closed permanently in February 2026 for $842,000 in unpaid rent and additional charges that led to its eviction. Following the eviction of Asean Streat, Westlake Center has 19 tenants left. Lingon Restaurant, which has been open near Westlake Center since November 2025, closed temporarily on February 15, 2026 to allow for construction on the adjacent Westlake Park's renovation for the 2026 FIFA World Cup. Its owner, Edward Bunker, stated that the facility would reopen on March 5.

== Gallery ==
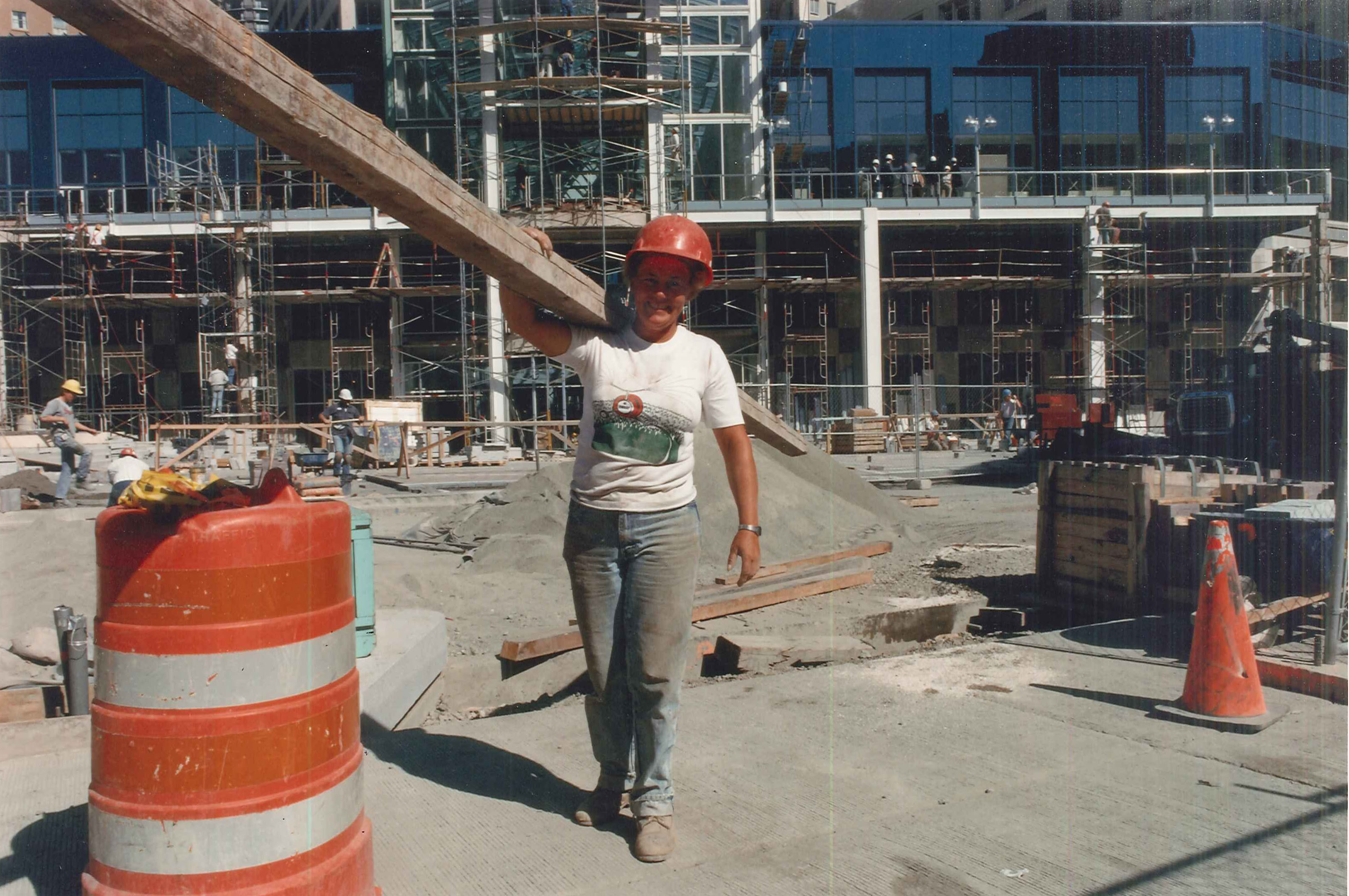
Under construction, c. 1988

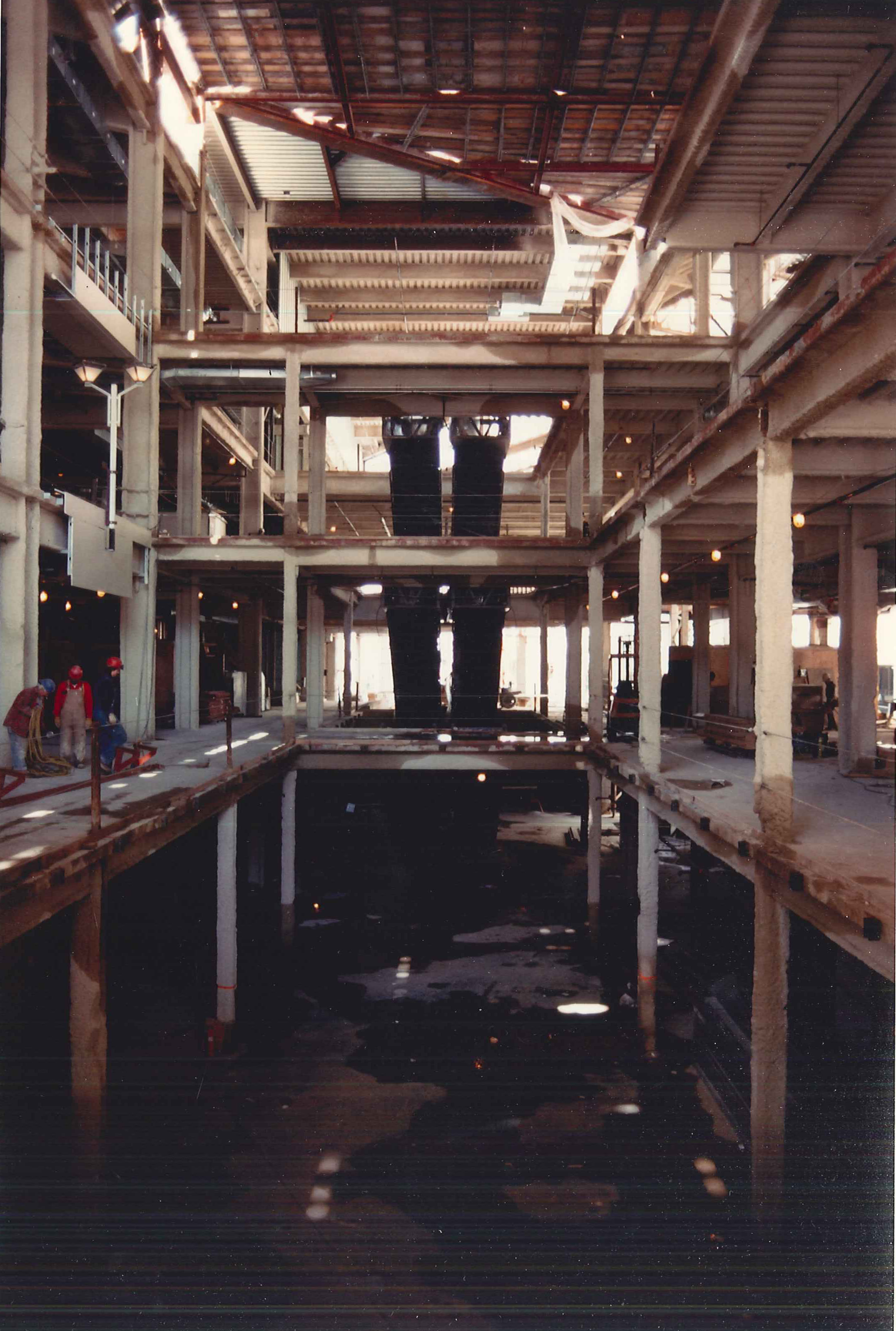
Interior under construction, c. 1988

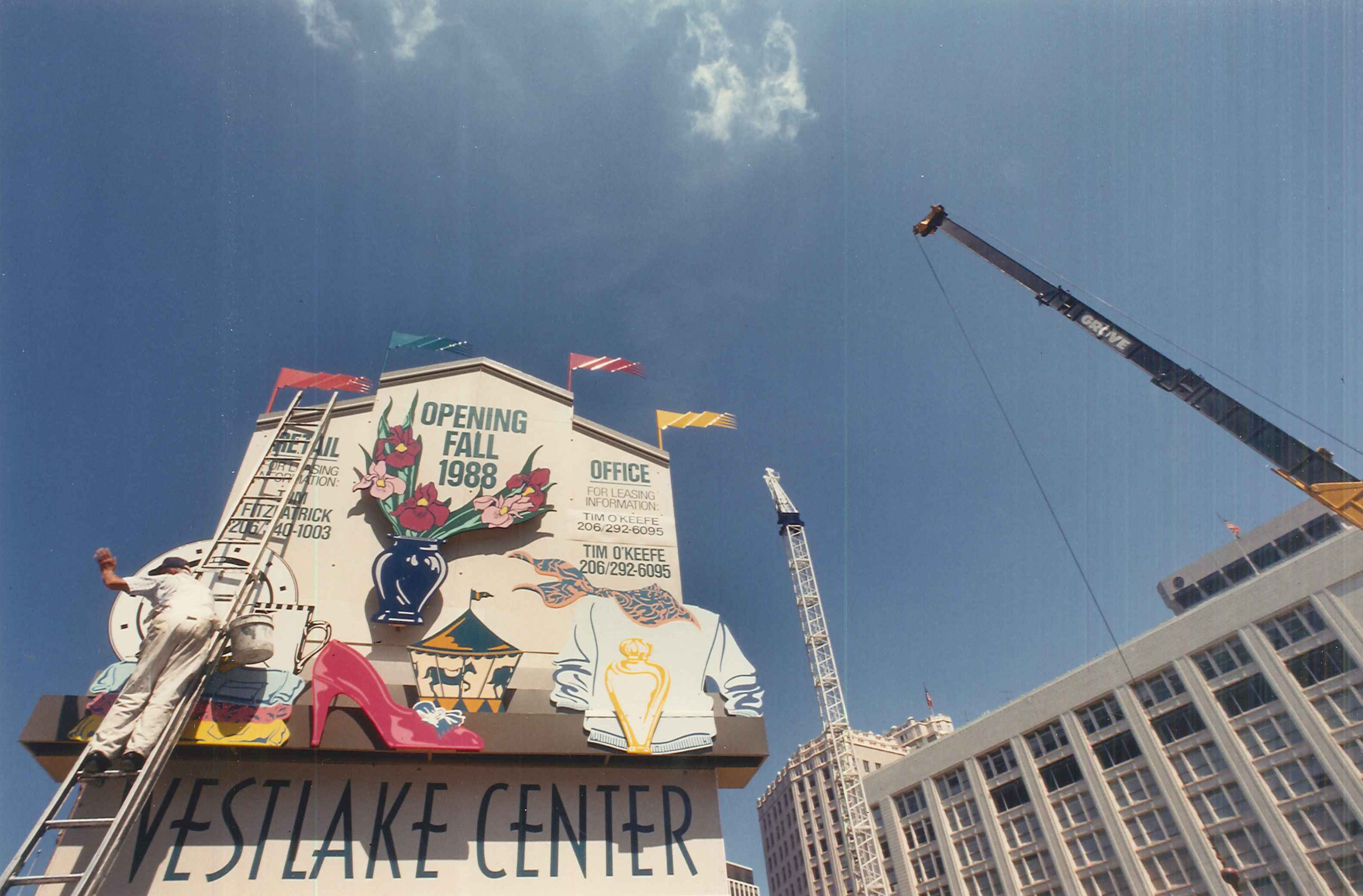
Fall 1988 opening notice

== See also ==
- List of upscale shopping districts
- Arizona Center, National Place, and Pioneer Place, all of which also developed by Rouse
