= Asean Streat Food Hall =

Defunct food hall in Seattle, Washington, U.S.

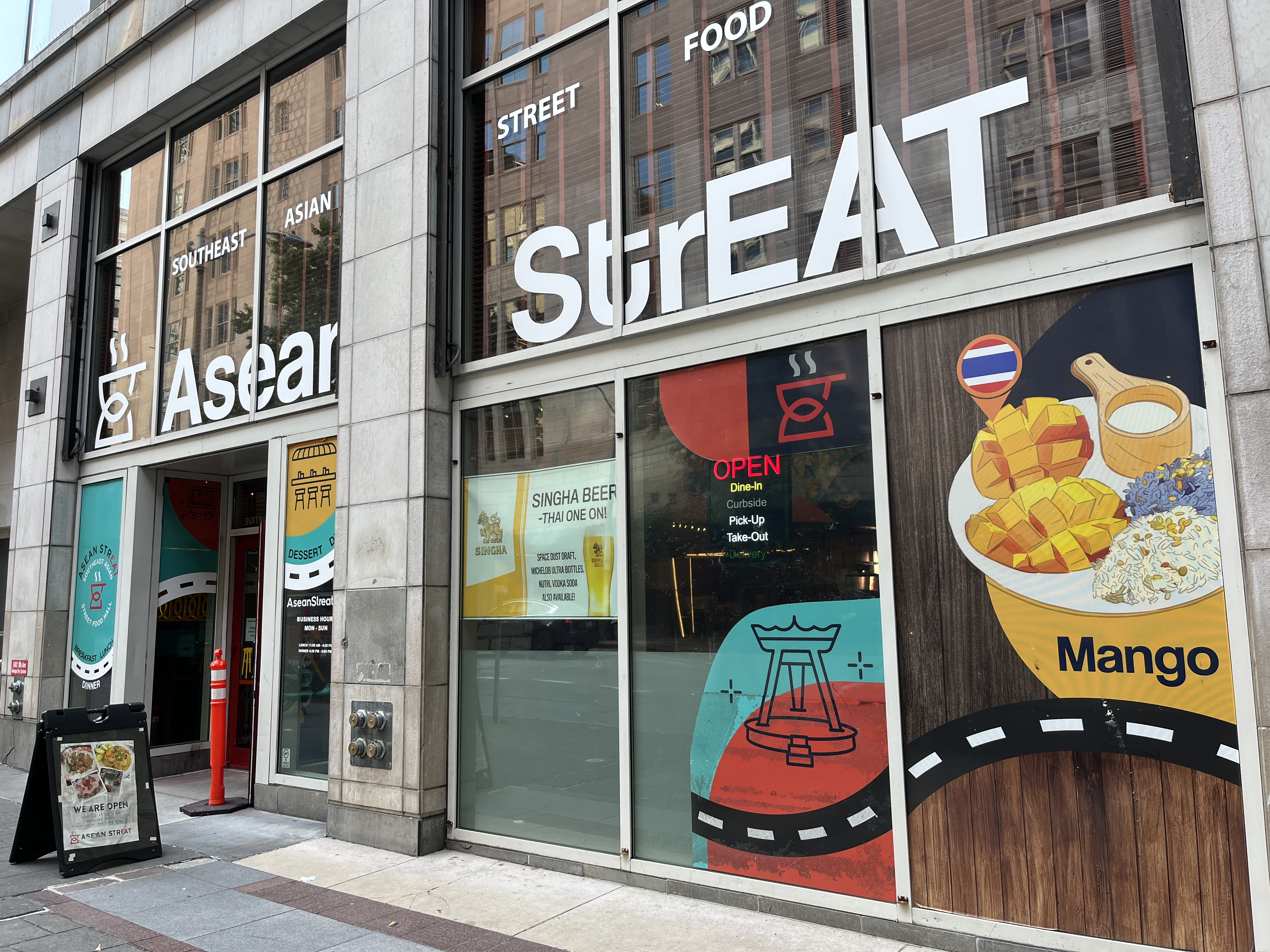
- The food hall's exterior in July 2023
- Interactive map of Asean Streat Food Hall
- Address: Seattle, Washington; United States
- Coordinates: 47°36′42″N 122°20′15″W
- Owner: Punya Tipyasothi
- Operator: Punya Tipyasothi
- Type: Food hall

Construction
- Opened: November 2022; 3 years ago
- Closed: February 13, 2026; 6 months ago
- Years active: 2022–2026

Website
- aseanstreet.com (2025 archive)

Asean Streat Food Hall (stylized as Asean StrEAT Food Hall) was a food hall in Seattle, in the U.S. state of Washington. Inspired by the food markets of Southeast Asia, it operated at the intersection of Fourth Avenue and Pine Street, in the shopping mall called Westlake Center. The food hall opened in November 2022 and closed permanently in February 2026. It had ten stalls for restaurants serving various types of Asian cuisine.

== Description ==
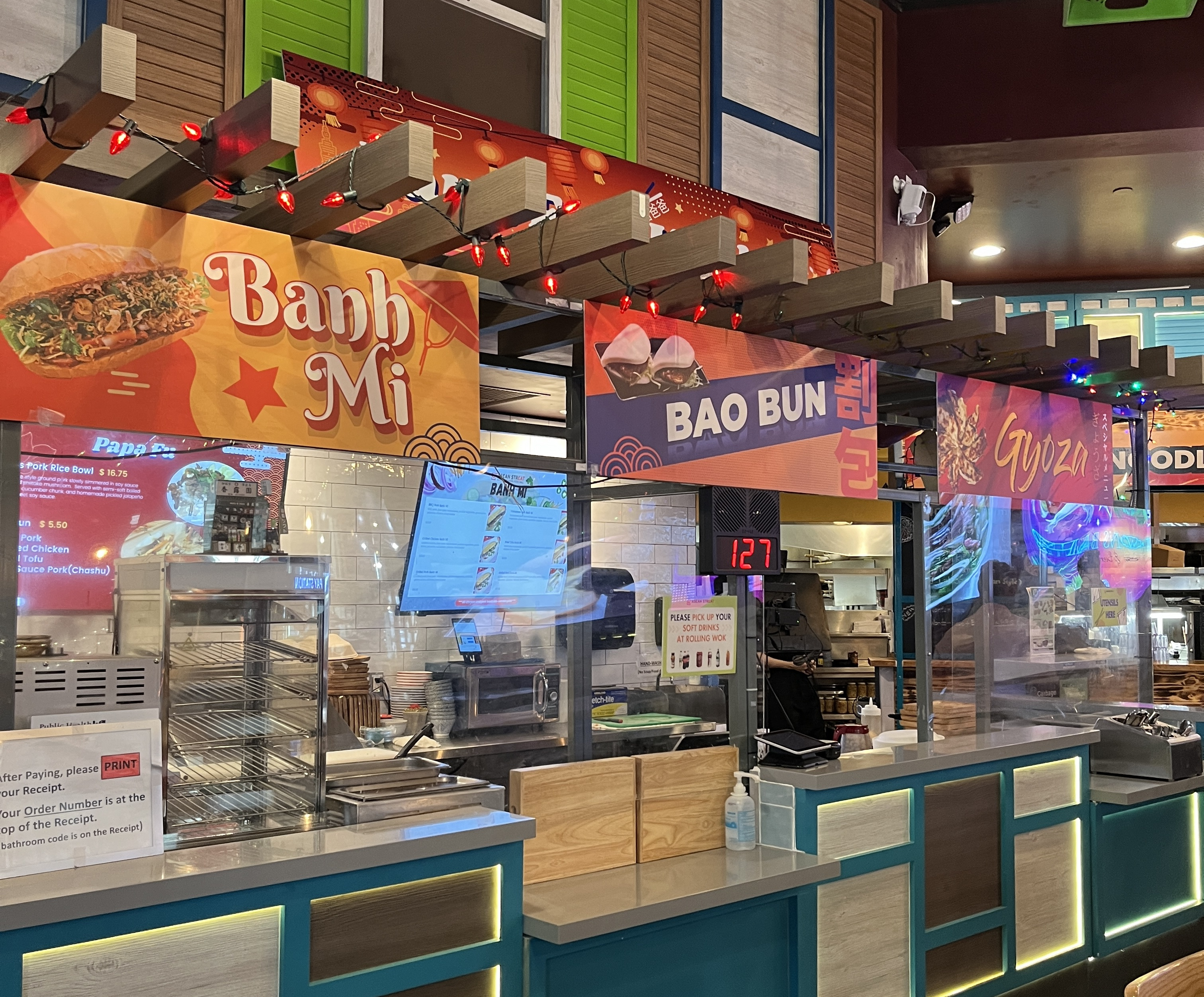
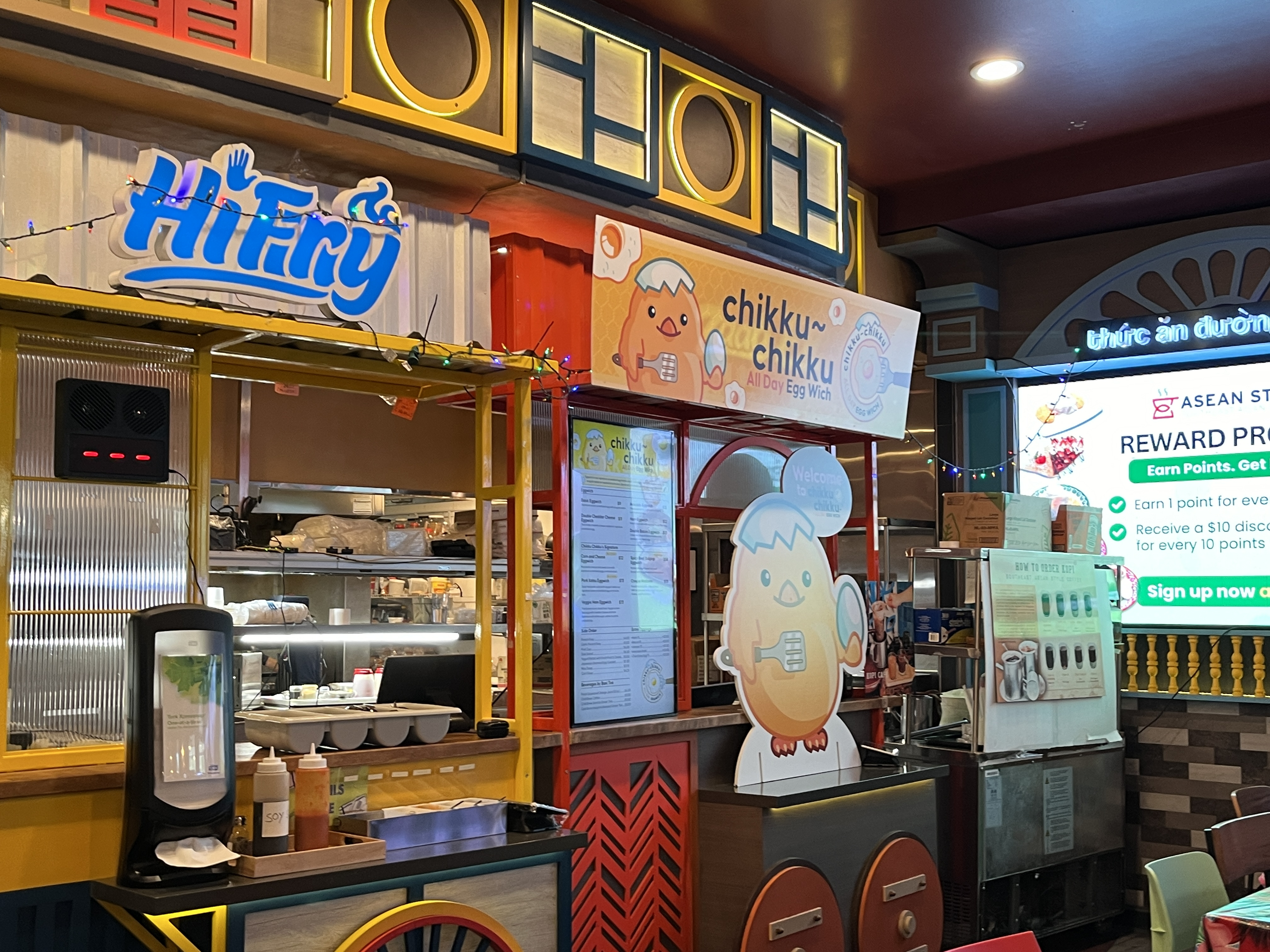
Interior stalls in 2024

The Asean Streat Food Hall operated at the intersection of 4th Avenue and Pine Street in downtown Seattle's Westlake Center. The food hall had ten stalls for restaurants serving various types of Asian cuisine. It was open for lunch and dinner seven days a week. The interior had a communal dining area, as well as bright colors and lights, "funky" decor, milk crates hanging from the ceiling, and large video screens showing available dishes being prepared. Tan Vinh of The Seattle Times compared the 8,600-square-foot food hall to a "subterranean carnival arcade" with loud sounds and a "fruit Life Savers" color scheme. Stalls had fake wheels.

Named after the countries of the Association of Southeast Asian Nations (ASEAN), the food hall offered cuisine from various countries, including Cambodia, China, Indonesia, Japan, Laos, Myanmar, the Philippines, Singapore, and Thailand. Businesses included Bugis Street, Hi Fry, Kopi Cafe, Phancy Pho, Rolling Wok, Sweet Moon, and Zaab Eli. Each stall offered streamlined menus with 5–10 dishes. Food options included Singapore-style Hainan chicken, hang lay pork curry, Thai soup tom yum, ukoy shrimp fritters, Vietnamese seafood boil, and lattes with matcha. Approximately 100 types of noodle, rice, and soup options were available, as were bubble teas, coffee, crepes, ice cream, and pastries.

== History ==
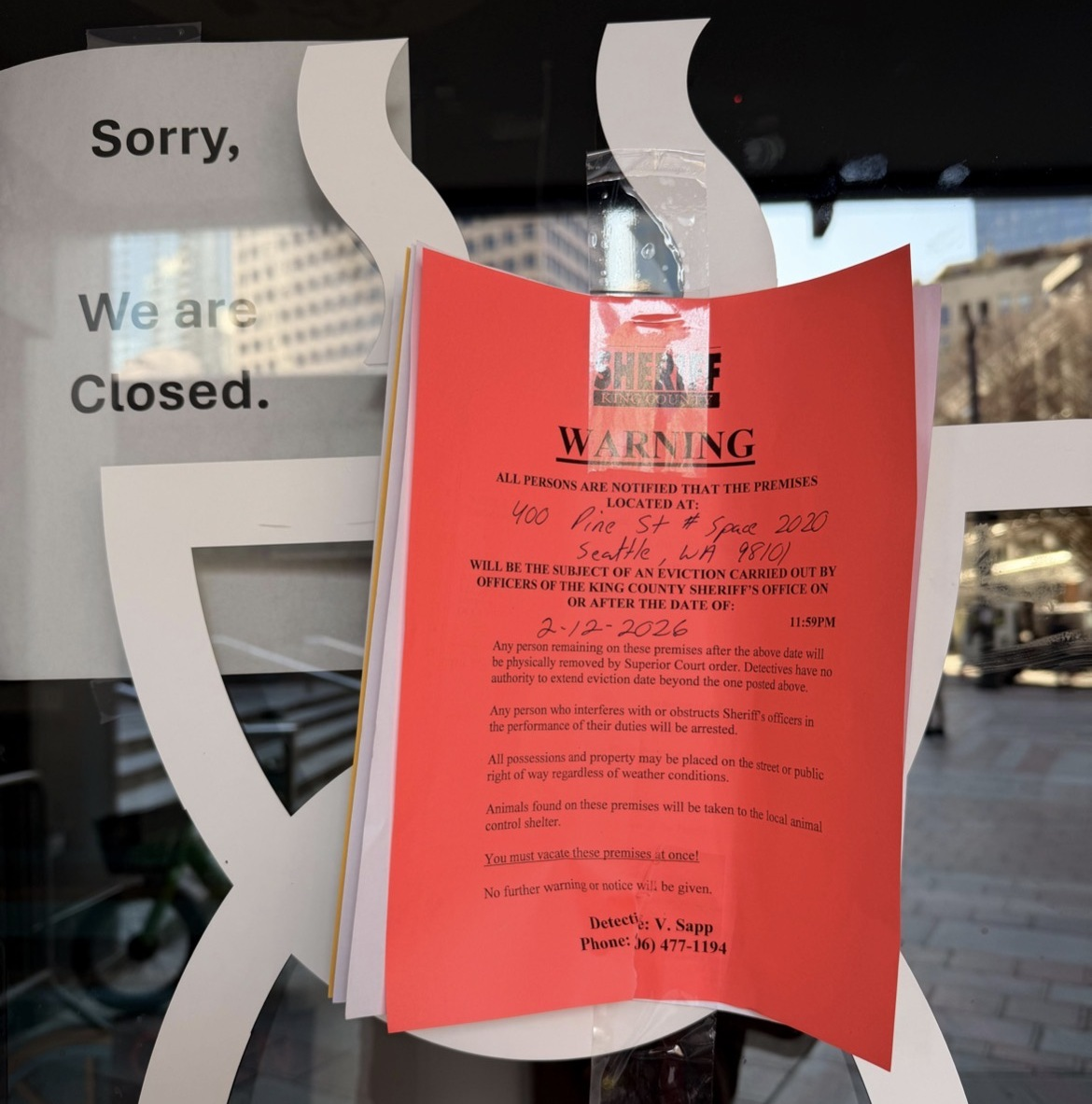
The eviction warning notice on the food hall's entrance, February 2026

Owned by Punya Tipyasothi, the food hall opened in November 2022, in the space that previously housed a P. F. Chang's location. Tan Vinh of The Seattle Times observed about food hall's operations and clientele: "During lunch, the line to order sometimes snakes across the dining area. Another forms around 6 p.m. when office workers linger for Hainanese chicken and Burmese tofu curry. On Saturdays, the food hall fills with 20-something Asians and Asian Americans who are bent on ordering everything on the menu in one sitting." Meg Van Huygen of The Stranger observed, "The food hall was pretty packed the first time I stopped by, on a Saturday afternoon, but it was poppin' even when I returned on a Monday night. The crowd was in their 20s and 30s, super buzzy energy, and only three or four empty tables in the joint."

In 2023, the food hall's manager said staff "often deal with safety issues involving people loitering in the area".

Asean StrEAT was given an eviction notice by Brookfield Properties, involving the King County Sheriff's Office, forcing the food hall to cease operations by 11:59 p.m., February 12, 2026. It closed permanently on February 13.

The reason the food hall was kicked out was because of $842,000 in unpaid rent and additional charges.

== Reception ==
The website Delish ranked Asean Streat sixth in a 2023 list of the nation's seven best food halls. In 2023, Tan Vinh of The Seattle Times opined, "The chamber of commerce should give Asean owner Punya Tipyasothi the entrepreneur of the year award for the foot traffic he has brought downtown after the pandemic years." The Stranger recommended Rolling Wok's mee goreng kee mow, described as "spilling forth from a styrofoam Cup Noodle vessel", and said: "It’s a wonderful, extremely Instagrammable spectacle that had multiple phones pointed at it in every instance. Internet people say it's really good! It sure looks good." The newspaper's Meg Van Huygen also opined, "Basically, it's now my plan to eat one of everything at Asean Streat, and so should yours be. THIS is how you repurpose a giant 7,600-square-foot mall space here in the 21st century, folks. I'm so into it." In Eater Seattle's late 2023 article about restaurant innovation and industry trends, Seattle restaurant podcast host Syd Suntha said, "I love the Asean Streat food hall. It's a vibe to be able to go with a group and try a bunch of stuff from different place and make everyone happy. I would love to see these all over the city. It's a great way for smaller businesses to team up and work together to make something awesome. It just seems like a no-brainer."
