= Seattle Center Monorail =

Monorail line in Seattle, Washington, US

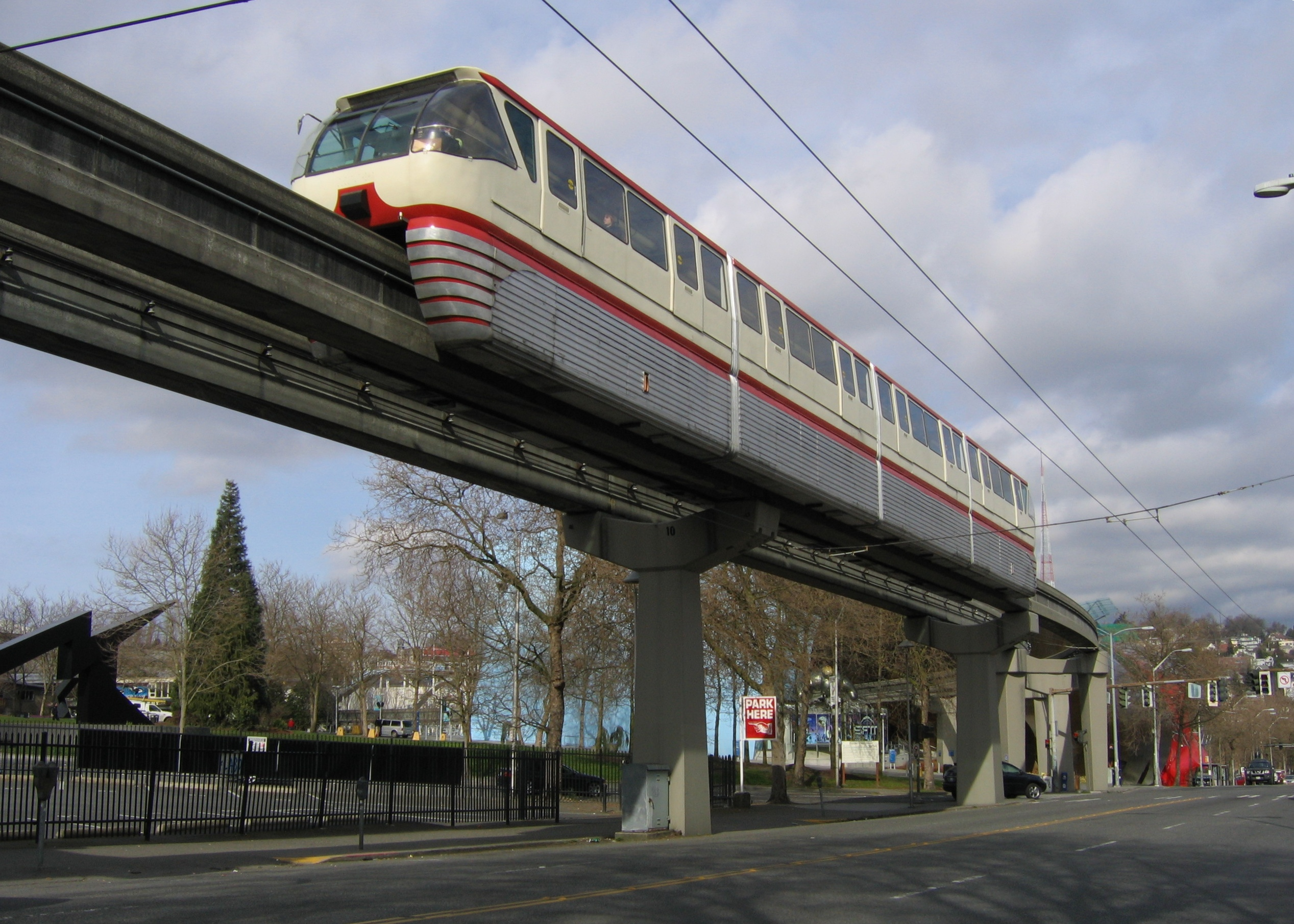
- The red monorail train passing over 5th Avenue

Overview
- Owner: City of Seattle
- Locale: Downtown Seattle, Washington, U.S.
- Termini: Seattle Center (north); Westlake Center (south)
- Stations: 2
- Website: seattlemonorail.com

Service
- Type: Straddle-beam monorail
- Operator: Seattle Monorail Services
- Rolling stock: 2 Alweg trains
- Daily ridership: 7,568 (2025)
- Ridership: 2,292,743 (2025)

History
- Opened: March 24, 1962

Seattle Landmark
- Designated: August 4, 2003

Technical
- Line length: 0.9 miles (1.4 km)
- Number of tracks: Double
- Character: Elevated
- Electrification: Contact rails, 700 V DC
- Operating speed: 45 mph (72 km/h)
Route map
Interactive map

The Seattle Center Monorail is an elevated straddle-beam monorail line in Seattle, Washington, United States. The 0.9-mile (1.4 km) monorail runs along 5th Avenue between the Seattle Center and Westlake Center in Downtown Seattle, making no intermediate stops. The monorail is a major tourist attraction but also operates as a regular public transit service with trains every ten minutes running for up to 16 hours per day. It usually operates with one train per track, and the entire trip takes approximately two minutes. In 2025, the monorail carried 2.3 million total passengers; it regularly earns a profit that is split between the contractor and the city government.

The monorail was constructed in eight months at a cost of $4.2 million for the 1962 Century 21 Exposition, a world's fair hosted at the Seattle Center. It underwent major renovations in 1988 after the southern terminal was moved from its location over Pine Street to inside the Westlake Center shopping mall. The system retains its original fleet of two Alweg trains from the world's fair; each carries up to 450 people. It was the second daily operating monorail in the United States, preceded by the Disneyland Monorail in 1959, also developed by Alweg. It is owned by the city government, which designated the tracks and trains as a historic landmark in 2003. A private contractor has operated the system since 1994, when it replaced King County Metro, the county's public transit system.

Several government agencies and private companies have proposed expansions to the monorail system since its inception in the 1960s. The most prominent was the Seattle Monorail Project, founded by a 1997 ballot initiative to build a citywide network that would expand coverage beyond the planned Link light rail system. The project ran into financial difficulties, including cost estimates rising to $11 billion, before being cancelled by a city vote in 2005. Several major accidents have occurred during the system's half-century in service, including a train-to-train collision in 2005 on a gauntlet track near the Westlake Center terminal.

== Route and stations ==
Video of a northbound trip on the monorail from Westlake Center to the Seattle Center, filmed in 2015

The 0.9-mile (1.4 km) monorail begins at a terminal at the Seattle Center, a civic complex and park northwest of Downtown Seattle. The Seattle Center terminal is located at the Next 50 Plaza near the center of the complex, adjacent to the Space Needle, Chihuly Garden and Glass, and Memorial Stadium. It is elevated above the south end of the plaza and consists of three platforms arranged in the Spanish solution: two side platforms for alighting and a center platform for boarding. The monorail trains' maintenance facility is below the platforms at ground level in the Seattle Center station. From the terminal, the tracks travel east and begin a wide turn to the south while passing through the Museum of Pop Culture, which was designed around the existing tracks.

The monorail tracks cross over Broad Street and travel along the west side of 5th Avenue North for two blocks, passing the KOMO Plaza news broadcasting center. The tracks then begin a gradual southeastern turn over a small office building and auto repair shop toward 5th Avenue, which begins on the south side of Denny Way and Tilikum Place. The one-way street travels southeast through Belltown with southbound-only traffic, split into two sets of through lanes by the monorail's supporting columns. Vehicular traffic is permitted to change lanes between the monorail columns despite the visual obstructions they create.

The monorail passes by several city landmarks, including the Amazon Spheres and Westin Seattle towers, eventually reaching McGraw Square, where 5th Avenue makes a slight turn to the south. Before reaching the southern terminal at the Westlake Center shopping mall on Pine Street, the monorail's tracks narrow into a set of gauntlet tracks that are 4 to 5 feet (1.2 to 1.5 m) apart, preventing two trains from using the station at the same time. The Westlake Center terminal is on the third floor of the mall and has a direct elevator to street level and the Westlake tunnel station served by Link light rail trains. The South Lake Union Streetcar also terminates at nearby McGraw Square, and several major bus routes run near the Westlake Center terminal.

== Service and fares ==
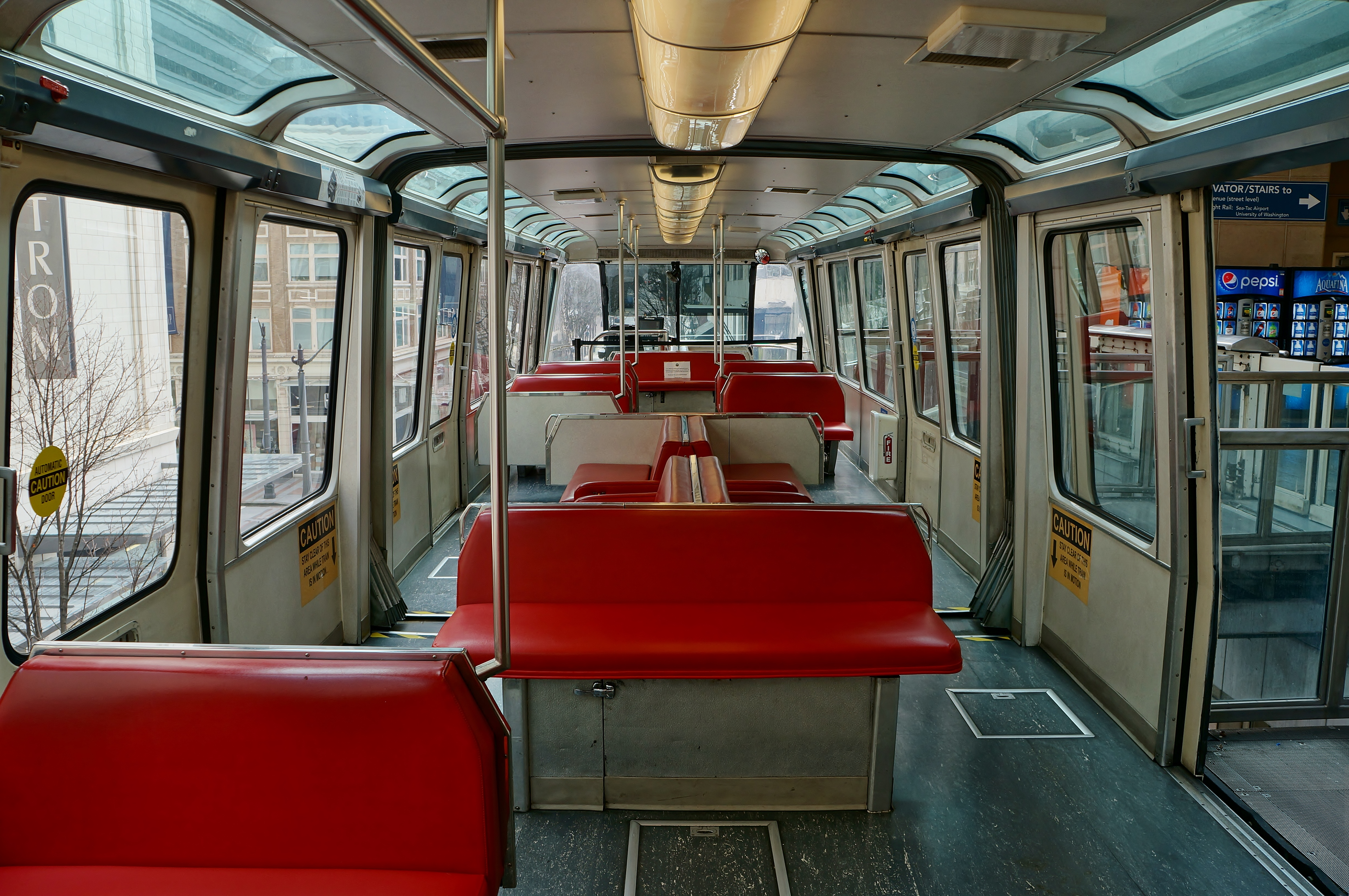
Interior of the red train, parked on the outer track at the Westlake Center terminal

The monorail takes approximately two minutes to travel between the Seattle Center and Westlake Center terminals, which are located 0.9 miles (1.4 km) apart. Trains depart from each terminal approximately every 10 minutes, typically with a single train running continuously. Service operates for 13.5 hours from Monday to Thursday, 15.5 hours on Friday, 14.5 hours on Saturday, and 12.5 hours on Sunday. On Friday and Saturdays, the final train departs at 11:00 p.m. Monorail service is typically reduced on national holidays and closed entirely on Thanksgiving Day and Christmas. During special events at the Seattle Center and Climate Pledge Arena, operating hours are extended and train frequencies are increased to every four minutes by using both trains in the fleet.

Fares for the monorail are paid at turnstiles at either terminal using an ORCA card, a smartphone app, or paper tickets bought from a vending machine with credit/debit cards, or mobile payments. As of 2025, one-way fares are $4 for adults, $2 for youths aged 6–18, and $2 for people qualifying for the reduced rate, including senior citizens 65 years and older, disabled individuals, persons with Medicare cards, and active duty members of the U.S. military carrying their identification cards. Round-trip fares are twice the price of a one-way fare; monthly passes are also offered at adult and reduced rates. Children aged five and under are able to ride free. In October 2019, the monorail began accepting ORCA cards, the regional transit payment system, after five years of negotiations and a study over fare integration; since May 2023, youth ORCA cards are charged a $0 fare on the monorail as part of a statewide program to provide free transit for riders aged 18 years or younger. The monorail's ORCA card policy was modified in January 2026 to remove a free transfer credit and instead charge a portion of the fare for users without a monthly or daily pass. Free fares have also been provided to attendees of all public events at Climate Pledge Arena through a mobile app since January 2023 after an existing program for the Seattle Kraken and Seattle Storm was expanded. Fares are adjusted by the city government and Seattle Monorail Services to cover operational costs and remain in line with consumer inflation.

== Operations ==
A private contractor, Seattle Monorail Services (SMS), founded in 1994, and currently owned by former Port of Seattle commissioner Tom Albro, operates the Seattle Center Monorail. Before 1994, the monorail was jointly operated by the Seattle Center and King County Metro, the county's public transit agency. The monorail receives no operating funds from public sources, with costs covered by fares and federal grants for capital projects; the service is unusual among U.S. public transport systems because it makes an operating profit. The contract between SMS and the city government is renewed every ten years and includes an even split of profits between the two parties.

In 2024, the Seattle Center Monorail carried approximately 2.3 million passengers, averaging 5,375 passengers on weekdays and 8,664 passengers on weekends. Following declines due to the COVID-19 pandemic, ridership rebounded in 2022 and 2023 with the opening of Climate Pledge Arena, where event tickets include free transit fares. The service generated $6.9 million in fare revenue and received $1.5 million in total capital funds from local and federal governments in 2025. During the Century 21 Exposition from March to September 1962, the monorail carried over 90 percent of World's Fair visitors and had a total ridership of 7.4 million.

=== Rolling stock and guideway ===
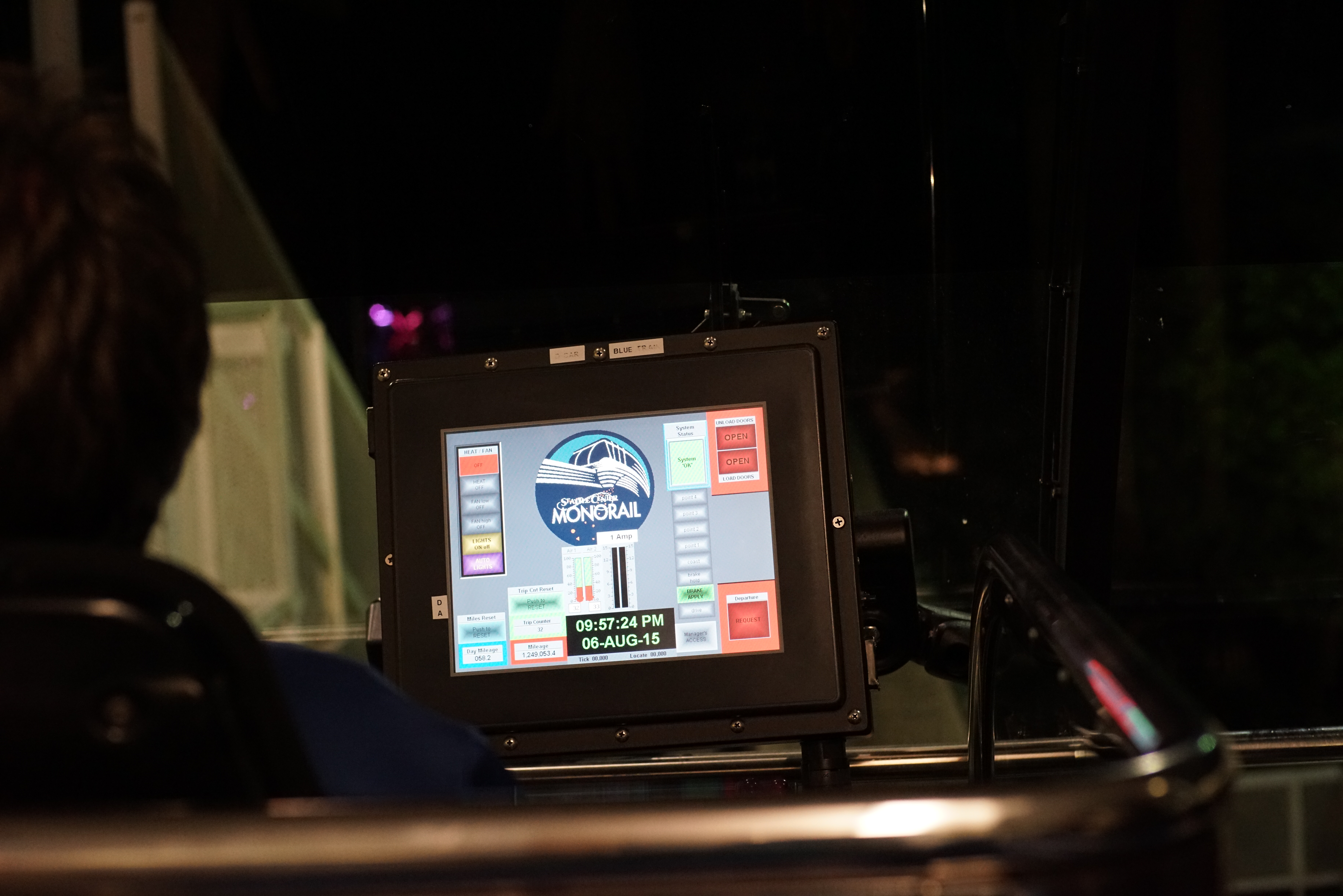
An LCD monitor used by monorail drivers

The straddle-beam monorail is entirely elevated and uses a series of 68 hollow support columns up to 30 feet (9.1 m) above street level. The two parallel tracks are carried on prestressed concrete beams that are approximately 70 ft (21 m) long, 5 ft (1.5 m) tall, and 3 ft (0.91 m) wide. Several sections use split or one-armed columns that carry one track because of a lack of space on curves; the guideway passes over one building at the intersection of Denny Way and 5th Avenue as part of a long curve in the tracks. The system's maintenance and operations base is underneath the platforms at the Seattle Center terminal.

The system has two aluminum trains, named the "Blue Train" (originally Spirit of Seattle) and "Red Train" (originally Spirit of Century 21) for their original paint schemes, which are each assigned to a single track and travel bidirectionally. They were constructed in 1962 by Alwac International in West Germany and have remained in operation on the line since then, undergoing a major renovation in 2009 and 2010. Each train is 122 ft (37 m) long, 10 ft 3 in (3.12 m) wide, and 14 ft (4.3 m) tall, with articulating joints between sections. They each have 124 seats and a capacity of 450 passengers with standing room, with an estimated maximum throughput of 10,800 passengers per hour. The trains originally had built-in emergency ramps to transfer passengers between trains if stopped between stations.

Each train rides on a set of 64 pneumatic rubber tires arranged into eight bogies: 16 are load-bearing tires arranged in pairs on top of the beam and have a diameter of 39.5 in (100 cm); the remaining 48 tires are used to guide the train on the side of the beam and have a diameter of 26 in (66 cm). The system was designed for automated driving, but operators control the trains using a joystick and LCD monitors that display technical information. The trains typically coast without power for the latter half of their journey and switch to dynamic brakes when approaching a station. The system uses contact rails on the beam for electrification that supply 700 volts DC for eight electric motors. Originally, the trains could reach speeds of up to 60 to 70 miles per hour (97 to 113 km/h), but this has since been reduced to 45 mph (72 km/h) for normal operations. During severe winter weather, the trains deposit de-icing chemicals and salt on the tracks to allow for normal speeds.

== History ==
=== Early proposals and planning ===
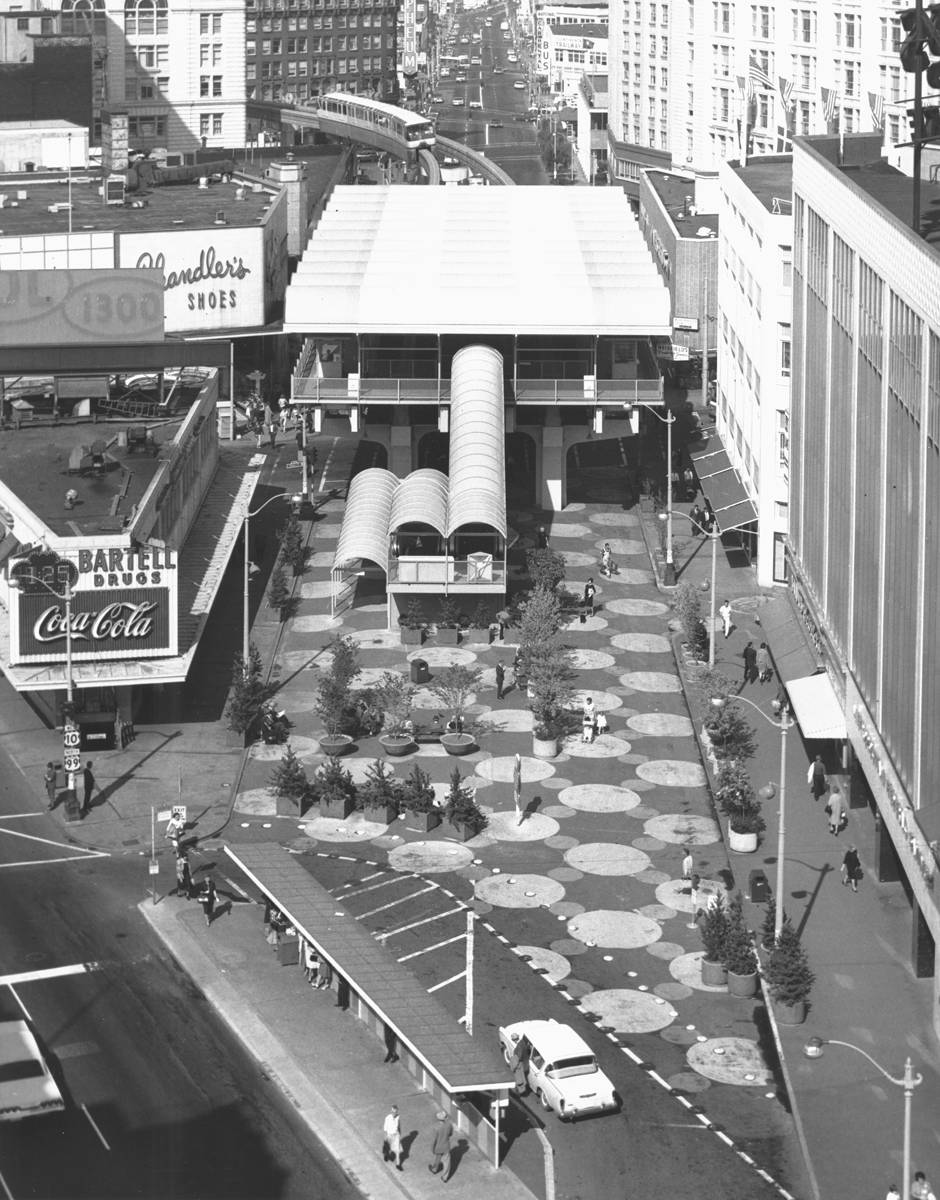
South terminus of the monorail in 1963

Several small-scale proposals for monorail systems in the Seattle area were published in the early 20th century, but they were never realized. William H. Boyes, a New York City inventor, was photographed with a replica of his monorail in 1910, with plans to build a line from Seattle to Tacoma. A year later, another Boyes proposal earned an operating franchise from the city government of Edmonds, Washington, but never proceeded beyond the early stages of construction. Another plan from the Universal Elevated Railway Company in 1918 envisioned an elevated monorail system that would run along Westlake Avenue in Seattle (near the modern-day monorail terminal), replacing the private streetcar network. After the streetcars were acquired by the city government in 1919, its lobbying for a monorail system ceased. Other plans for monorail systems were submitted to the Seattle city government in 1930 and 1955, the latter as part of the Everett–Seattle–Tacoma Tollway (modern Interstate 5).

The Seattle city government, supported by civic boosters and the state legislature, began planning for its second World's Fair in 1955 to celebrate the 50th anniversary of the 1909 Alaska–Yukon–Pacific Exposition. A monorail was suggested in 1957 to connect the proposed fairgrounds in Lower Queen Anne to auxiliary parking lots in Interbay and attractions on Elliott Bay. The Seattle Transit Commission ordered a study into a monorail between Downtown Seattle and the proposed fairgrounds in April 1958, after hearing proposals from private operators who also offered New Orleans and Houston their own systems. Among the proposals was a "carveyor" from the Goodyear Tire and Rubber Company with small pods connecting downtown to the fairgrounds and a 5-mile (8.0 km) loop between Interbay, the fairgrounds, and downtown. The monorail proposal was later scaled back to a 1.2-mile (1.9 km) route on 5th Avenue connecting downtown hotels to the fairgrounds that would cost $5.39 million to construct (equivalent to $44.8 million in 2024 dollars).

=== Bidding and proposals ===
The Seattle Transit System opened up bids for monorail design and construction in December 1958, receiving proposals from the Lockheed Corporation, St. Louis Car Company, General Monorail of San Francisco, and the German firm Alwac International, which had begun installing the Disneyland Monorail in California. The Northrop Corporation presented its own proposal in February, using an unconventional gyroscope and generator that would not require a third rail or overhead catenary. In April 1959, the Seattle Transit Commission chose Lockheed to build the $5 million monorail system, which would travel along 5th Avenue from Pine Street to the fairgrounds and open in 1961. Lockheed's design featured a straddle-beam monorail with three streamlined trains that resembled jetliners.

The monorail was seen as a centerpiece to the planned Century 21 Exposition and as a catalyst for future development of a citywide rapid transit system, but would use no local transit funding. The operating costs were expected to be paid through fare recovery, while other options were considered for capital funding, including Lockheed buying back the system after the world's fair. Lockheed entered into final negotiations with the city and exposition organizers in late 1959, but the transit commission lost interest in running the system after the world's fair was shortened to six months instead of the original eighteen. The system's uncertain financing, not including engineering costs incurred by Lockheed, remained a major concern for the city government as negotiations continued into January 1960.

Alwac International, which had previously estimated it would cost $3.5 million ($28.4 million in 2024 dollars) to install their Alweg monorail system, submitted a proposal in February 1960 to finance and build the project themselves at no cost to the city or exposition organizers. The firm would collect monorail fares and revenue from terminal concessions, and a surcharge on fair tickets, and transfer the system to the city government if the full $3.5 million cost was repaid; in the event that the system did not recoup the investment, it would have been dismantled and removed. Lockheed responded by presenting a modified bid to the transit commission in March with a $1 million buyback option, but they were dropped in favor of a new round of bidding by Alwac and the French engineering firm SAFEGE.

The Century 21 Steering Committee, serving as the exposition's main organizers, took over negotiations from the transit commission and signed a preliminary construction contract with Alwac on May 20, 1960. The monorail would run along 5th Avenue from the fairgrounds to the intersection of Pine Street and Westlake Avenue, which would be converted into a permanent pedestrian mall. Alwac representatives signed the design contract on December 22, 1960, with a revised cost of $4.2 million ($34 million in 2024 dollars) to accommodate larger trains and stations. The final construction and operations contract was signed on May 13, 1961. Century 21 announced plans in April 1961 to build a small-scale people mover around the fairgrounds that would use a suspended monorail, but they were dropped five months later after the bidding firms were unable to obtain financing.

=== Construction and preparations ===
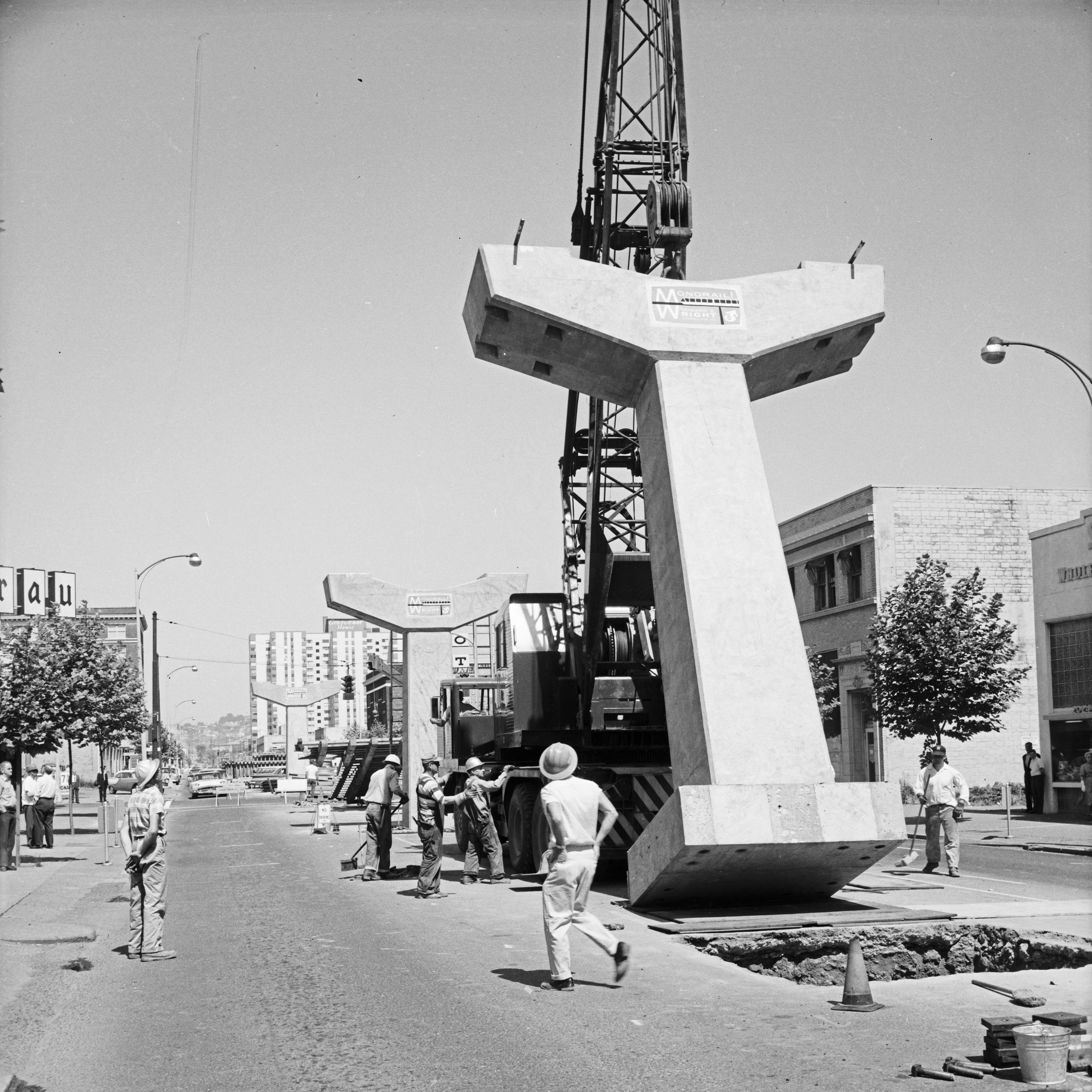
Column construction for the monorail at 5th Avenue and Virginia Street, June 1961

In March 1961, the city's Board of Public Works approved the construction and street use permits for the monorail project, which Century 21, Alwac, and local contractor Howard S. Wright Construction Company would undertake. Wright was also named a financing partner for the monorail, contributing $375,000 ($3 million in 2024 dollars), and went on to build the Space Needle and Seattle Center Coliseum. The construction permit included a requirement to remove the monorail within six months of the exposition's end, but Alwac had announced their intention to sell the Alweg system to the city government if they desired. Alweg representatives unveiled the finalized design plans for the monorail later that month, while the two railcars were under construction at the Linke-Hofmann-Busch factory in West Germany. Century 21 broke ground on the monorail in a ceremony at the Westlake Mall on April 6, 1961, which was declared "Monorail Day" and featured the Seattle Symphony Orchestra, a speech from Senator Warren G. Magnuson, and free monorail tickets for the 500 people in attendance.

The wooden forms for the first of 80 monorail columns were laid in early May, and concrete pouring for the first column began on May 23 between Virginia and Lenora streets. A crane lifted the Virginia–Lenora columns, each weighing 54 short tons (49,000 kg), onto a prepared concrete footing on June 15. Concrete pouring at the Westlake Mall terminal began in late June, with plans to build the station platforms 25 feet (7.6 m) over Pine Street. The monorail's 60-short-ton (54,000 kg) precast concrete beams were assembled in Tacoma and trucked up to Seattle, with special permission from the Washington State Highway Commission, and the first was installed on September 21 between Virginia and Stewart streets before advancing northwards. Column construction and girder installation took approximately eight months, with at least three lanes of traffic on 5th Avenue remaining open during most periods.

The steel girders at the Westlake Mall terminal were installed in October, followed by work on the Seattle Center terminal. By December 1961, most of the work on the tracks and 54 percent of work on the stations was complete, using 14,700 short tons (13,300,000 kg) of concrete and 970 short tons (880,000 kg) of steel. The last of the 138 guideway beams was hoisted and installed on January 9, 1962, near Denny Way to complete 5,200 feet (1,600 m) of track. In February 1962, the Seattle Transit Commission approved a contract with Century 21 to allow its employees to operate the monorail trains. Monorail personnel, including drivers and ticket booth attendants, wore blue-and-white poplin uniforms designed for the exposition.

The first monorail train, later named the "Blue Train", was shipped in four sections from Bremen, West Germany, to Newark, New Jersey, and transported by train to Seattle. It arrived on February 19, 1962, and was lifted onto the trackway later that day. The monorail completed its first test run on March 3 and continued with several tests at reduced speeds. Jim West, a former cable car operator on the Yesler Way line who later drove the city's streetcars, trolleybuses and motor buses, drove the first test run. Several test runs were made into special occasions, including a trip that was televised live by KING-TV and a preview ride for 175 dignitaries after a ribbon cutting at the Westlake terminal on March 12. The second train, later named the "Red Train", arrived on March 27 and was installed on its track at the Seattle Center terminal. It made its first test run on April 10 and entered passenger service to replace the Blue Train temporarily before the beginning of the fair.

=== World's Fair ===
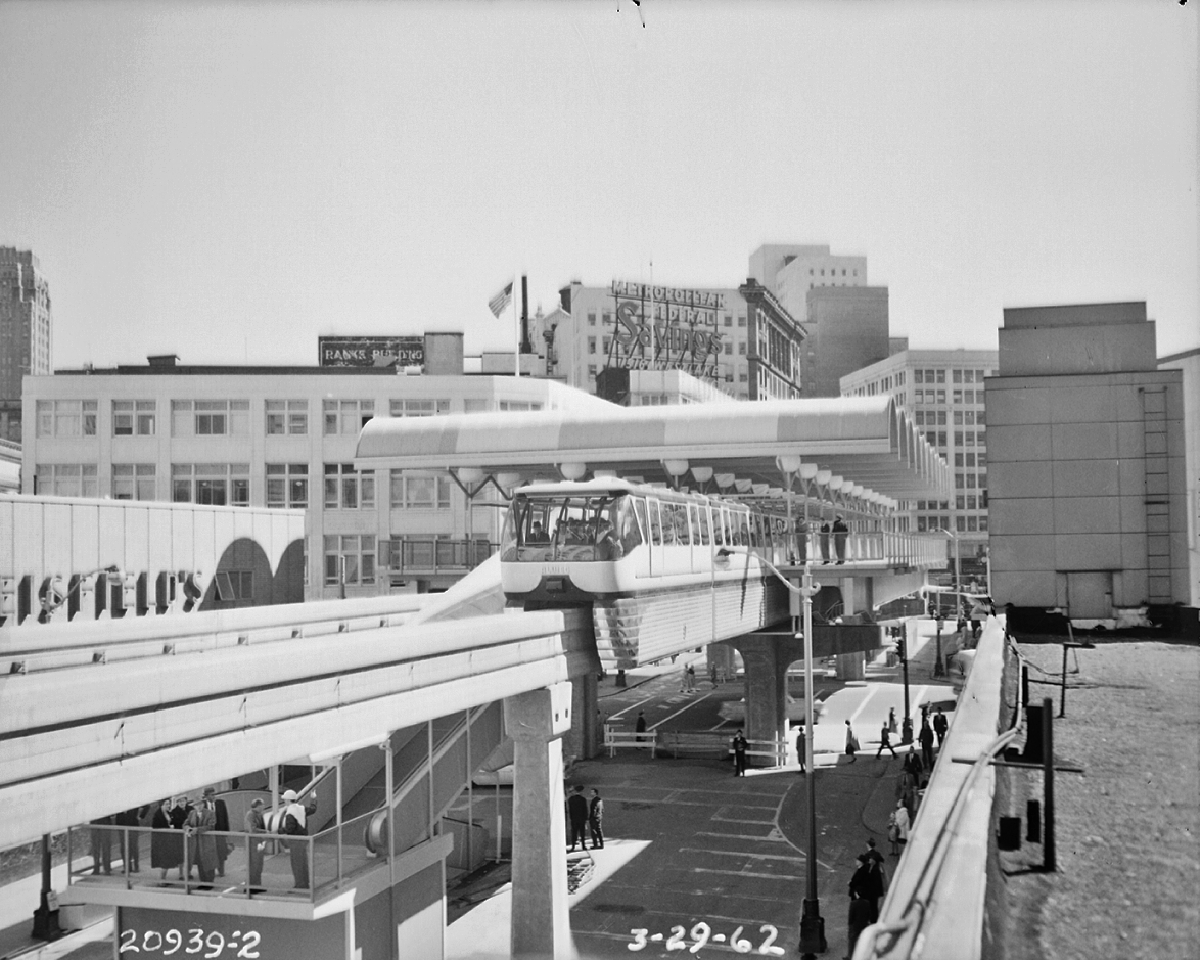
The Westlake Mall terminal, seen from a nearby building in 1962

The monorail and Space Needle opened for a public preview on March 24, 1962, a month before the formal start of the Century 21 Exposition. The inaugural monorail trip from the Westlake terminal carried 130 passengers who received commemorative medals, including the first riders, who had lined up several hours early. An estimated 9,600 people rode the Blue Train on the monorail's first day, as did 24,000 over the preview weekend; service on the first day was suspended an hour earlier than scheduled because of a mechanical issue. Government officials and civic leaders officially christened the monorail on April 19. 179,000 passengers had boarded the trains during preview rides.

The Century 21 Exposition formally opened on April 21. Monorail fares during the fair were set at 50 cents one-way and 75 cents round-trip for adults and 35 cents one-way and 50 cents round-trip for children. Trains operated from 8:45 a.m. to 12:15 a.m. during the fair, taking 96 seconds to complete each trip. It carried 7.4 million passengers, about 90 percent of fair attendees, from April 21 to October 21. Astronaut John Glenn rode the monorail on May 10, shortly after his return from orbit on Friendship 7; the red train was temporarily renamed "Friendship 21" in his honor and also carried Governor Albert D. Rosellini, Senator Warren G. Magnuson, and NASA rocket scientist Wernher von Braun. After the fair, the monorail operated with a reduced schedule, from 11:00 a.m. to 11:00 p.m. It was limited to one train over the winter months but averaged 1,200 daily passengers.

Fare box revenue generated from March 24 to September 17 fully covered the system's $4.2 million construction costs. Alwac retained temporary ownership of the monorail system after the fair contracted to end on April 21, 1963. The city government was tasked with deciding whether the monorail should be demolished or sold to a public or private operator. Alwac was granted an extension of its existing street use permit to operate trains until October. Among the proposals considered was Samuel J. LeFrak's plan to sell the system to New York City for the 1964 World's Fair in Flushing Meadows.

Alwac agreed to transfer the entire system, including the terminals and offices, to Century 21 Center, Inc., the operator of the fairgrounds, on June 3, 1963. The transfer came at no cost to Century 21 and allowed the monorail to remain in operation and included an extension of agreements with the city government and Seattle Transit System.

=== Ownership transfer and early years ===
Century 21 Center, Inc. ran into financial difficulties in late 1964, with $2 million in outstanding debt ($15.4 million in 2024 dollars), and began negotiating a takeover of all fairground operations by the city government, which already owned the Seattle Center property. As part of cost-saving measures, in October 1964 monorail ticket booths were eliminated and replaced with onboard attendants to take fares. Century 21 Center offered to sell the monorail to the city government for $600,000 ($4.62 million in 2024 dollars) as part of resolving its debts to the city and entering liquidation. Lacking an operating franchise, the corporation's liquidation trustees declined to take the title of the monorail system in December, and elected not to pay $200,000 for demolition. Negotiations continued for several months until the city government agreed in April to terminate its contracts with Century 21 and take over the fairground facilities. The monorail was transferred to the city government in May at a cost of $775,150 ($5.87 million in 2024 dollars), of which $414,128 ($3.14 million in 2024 dollars) was in the form of debt forgiveness.

The Seattle Center reopened for the summer season on June 1, 1965, with monorail fares lowered the following day to 25 cents for adults on a one-way trip to attract more patrons. The monorail's operating hours were extended to midnight on weekdays and Saturdays, and ridership in the first week of June doubled compared to the prior year. A group of property owners along the monorail route sued the city government in 1965 over the loss of views and other livability concerns stemming from the construction of the line. The city settled the lawsuit in 1968 at a cost of $776,249 ($5.33 million in 2024 dollars) for light and air easements on 82 parcels of property.

By the end of the 1960s, the monorail was averaging 10,000 passengers on weekdays and 14,000 on weekends during the peak summer season. The Seattle Transit System remained the contracted operator of the monorail until January 1, 1973, when the Municipality of Metropolitan Seattle (Metro Transit) absorbed it to form a countywide transit system. The Seattle city government retained ownership of the monorail and awarded an operating contract to Metro Transit using funding from the Seattle Center department. Under Metro Transit, the monorail vehicles were renumbered 6201 and 6202 and given a new paint scheme in 1978, including the repainting of the red train to the green train. The arrival of a traveling exhibition with artifacts from the tomb of Pharaoh Tutankhamun at the Seattle Center spurred the repainting. The exhibition caused a surge in monorail ridership, which reached 2.8 million in 1978.

=== Renovations and preservation ===
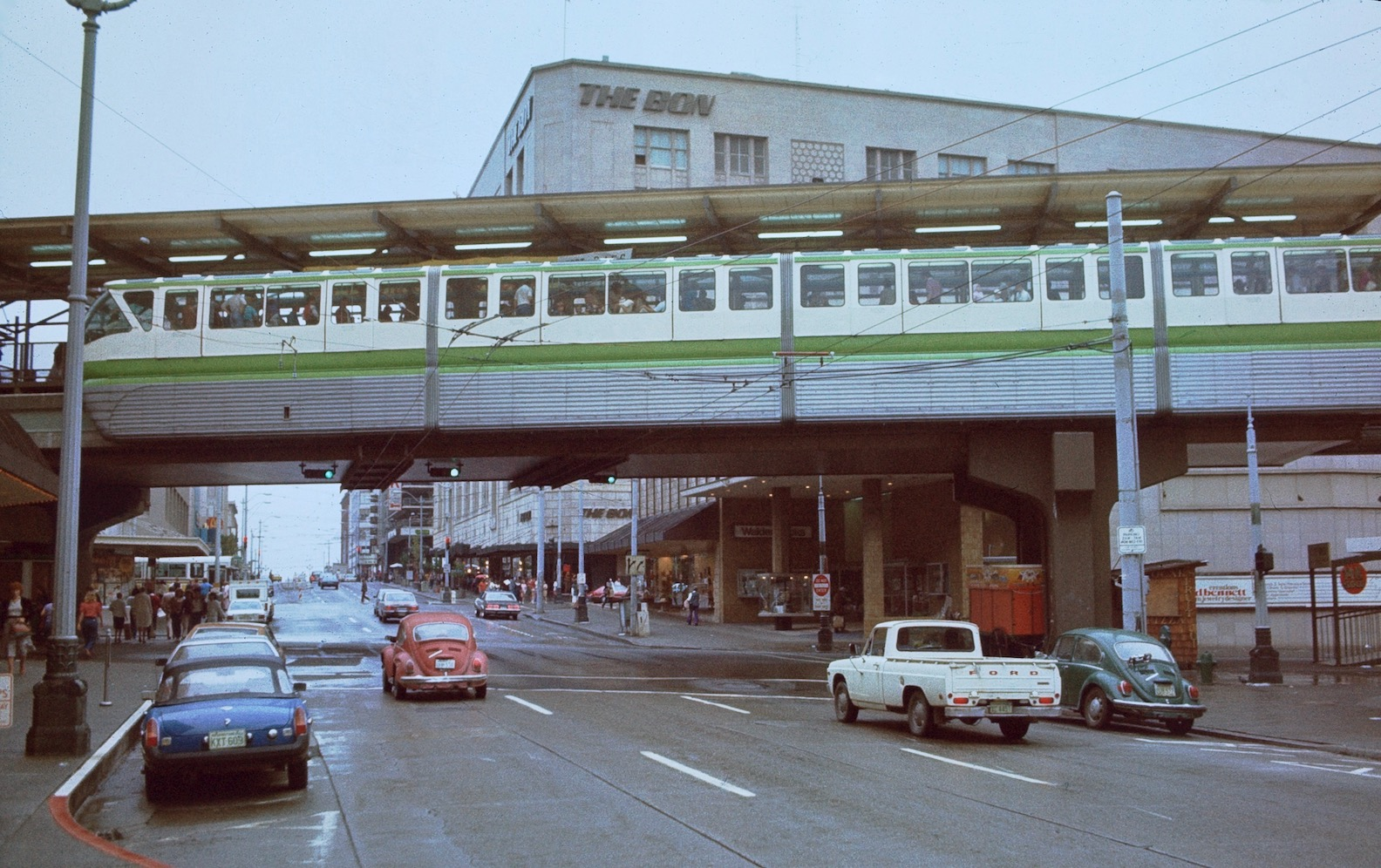
The old monorail terminal over Pine Street, as seen from the east in 1982

The southern terminus at Westlake Mall was originally a large station that straddled Pine Street along a section of Westlake Avenue that had been converted into a public plaza. The terminal had a sloped moving walkway between street level and the three elevated platforms covered by a "scalloped" roof. The plaza at Westlake Mall was sought as the location of an expanded downtown park, leading to a major renovation of the monorail terminal that began in January 1968 and completed in April 1968. Reduced monorail service continued while the terminal was shrunk through the removal of the outer platforms deemed unnecessary for post-fair demand and the replacement of the roof with a simpler design. An emergency repair to the Westlake terminal was made in 1974 at a cost of $100,000 ($493,433 in 2024 dollars) to replace metal shields that caught debris dropped by passengers on the platform.

A larger renovation was completed in 1988 to accommodate the downtown park, later named Westlake Park, and the adjacent Westlake Center shopping mall and office complex. The old terminal had been viewed as a "blight" on the area, which the city government sought for redevelopment as the center of Downtown Seattle's retail core beginning in the late 1960s. The city considered several proposals for a shopping mall on the block on the north side of Pine Street in the 1970s, including hotels, movie theaters, a potential home for the Seattle Art Museum, and a new monorail terminal, but they were never realized. After several years of litigation led by preservation activists, a new proposal from The Rouse Company and a local developer was approved for construction in late 1985.

The new proposal included demolition of the monorail terminal to make way for a public park, while trains would terminate at a new station integrated into the shopping mall. The relocation of the station was initially rejected in 1985 after engineers had discovered that the monorail tracks would require significant reconstruction to make the necessary turn into the station. The city government proposed moving the columns onto the sidewalk on 5th Avenue instead and creating a gauntlet track, which would prevent the two trains from using the Westlake terminal at the same time. City councilmember George Benson suggested using a retractable ramp to access the outer track. A temporary station would be used during mall construction to allow the monorail to continue operations. The monorail relocation project was estimated to cost $19 million ($46.9 million in 2024 dollars) with heavy reliance on a federal grant that was initially denied by the Urban Mass Transportation Administration. The city considered several options, including running a single train, selling the system to Tacoma or demolishing the monorail entirely. In March 1986, it chose to keep the system and spend $2.7 million ($6.53 million in 2024 dollars) on the initial planning for the station overhaul and other renovations.

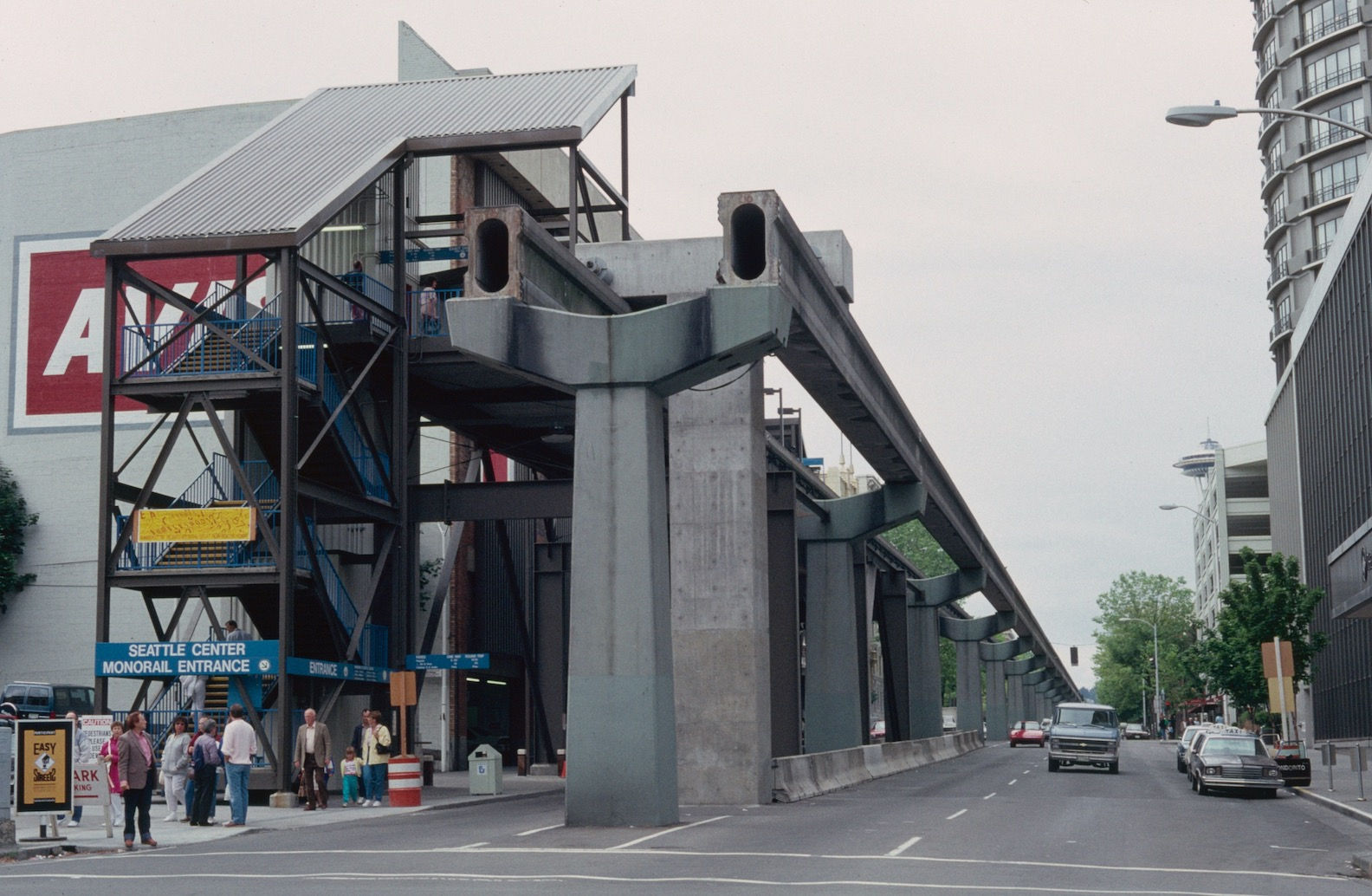
The temporary downtown terminal at Stewart Street, pictured in 1987 after the southern section of guideway had been demolished

The federal government awarded a $5.6 million grant ($13.6 million in 2024 dollars) for the relocation project in late July, two months after construction began on a temporary terminal at 5th Avenue and Stewart Street. The old terminal at Westlake Mall closed permanently on September 1, 1986, and was demolished over the following two months. The temporary terminal and its 140-foot (43 m) platform opened on September 17, 1986, allowing monorail service to resume after a two-week suspension. It was built one block to the north at Stewart Street, next to the western track, and only served the blue train. The city council finalized a $7 million spending package ($16.5 million in 2024 dollars) in March 1987 to construct the permanent terminal, which would begin after work on Pine Street for the Downtown Seattle Transit Tunnel advanced beyond the excavation stage.

The monorail project included improvements to the electrical systems and an expansion of the Seattle Center terminal, and work on the two trains. An extensive interior refurbishment was cut after the monorail project trended $1.7 million above budget ($4.01 million in 2024 dollars), and was later reduced to new paneling and floorboards. The Westlake Center shopping mall was opened to the public on October 20, 1988, with the new monorail terminal on the third floor used temporarily for one day before it closed for additional construction. Several days before the scheduled opening, engineers discovered the west track was two inches (50 mm) too close to the platform and mall building, preventing its use. The discovery was made when a retractable boarding ramp at the terminal scratched the blue train during a test run; a hinge pin that failed to fold properly was identified as the cause for the misalignment. The ramp was fixed in November, but other technical glitches and extended safety testing delayed the opening of the new terminal station for four months. The new Westlake Center monorail terminal opened on February 25, 1989, alongside the return of the red train to service.

In 1994, a private company replaced Metro Transit (later King County Metro) and the Seattle Center as the monorail's operator, signing a ten-year contract with the city. Metro had previously provided drivers and maintained the trains, while the Seattle Center employed ticket-takers and janitorial staff. Near the northern end of the line, the Experience Music Project building (now the Museum of Pop Culture) was constructed over the monorail tracks from 1998 to 2000. The building was designed so that the tracks would pass through a valley at the center of the structure, with windows from the exhibit spaces facing the guideway. The monorail tracks and vehicles were declared a historic landmark by the Seattle Landmarks Preservation Board in April 2003 amid plans to demolish or replace the line as part of a citywide monorail expansion. In July, the city council passed the landmark ordinance to provide protections to the two Alweg trains, but excluded the guideway to support its reuse for the expansion project.

The monorail began a long-term closure on March 16, 2020, due to decreased demand amid the COVID-19 pandemic in the Seattle area. It reopened on May 28 with limited service and suspension of cash ticket sales, but was closed again over the weekend because of protest activity in Downtown Seattle. Ridership in 2020 declined to 300,000 total, approximately 15 percent of the 2019 total.

=== Station renovations ===
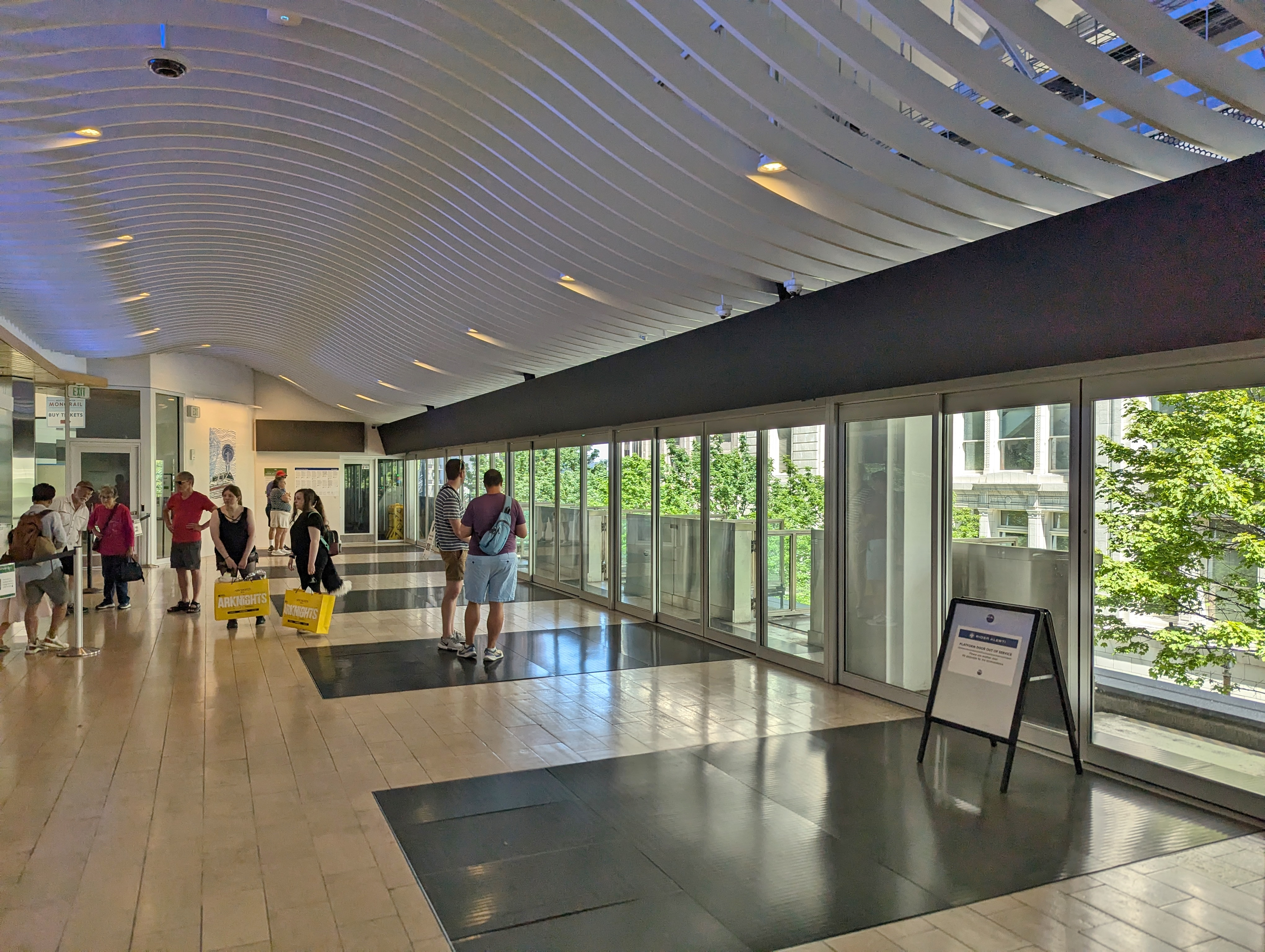
The Westlake Center terminal after its expansion in 2021

The monorail was integrated into the regional fare system in October 2019 with the acceptance of mobile tickets and later the ORCA card. As part of preparations for the opening of Climate Pledge Arena in 2021 at the renovated KeyArena for a National Hockey League team (later named the Seattle Kraken), Seattle Monorail Services announced a renovation of the monorail terminals in February 2020 to handle larger crowds. The Westlake Center terminal was to be expanded to accommodate 6,000 people per hour with new fare gates and ticket vending machines for ORCA cards and tickets. The NHL team would also fund free transit passes for attendees before and after games to reduce the number of car trips to the arena. A proposed second phase of the expansion program would have included a covered walkway and second entrance at the Westlake Center terminal with access from the Pine Street plaza and the transit tunnel station, but it was later abandoned. NHL Seattle, the Kraken's ownership group, also announced that it would purchase a 50 percent stake in Seattle Monorail Services.

Construction on the remodeled stations began in April 2021 with the demolition of the station interiors, which required a full suspension of monorail service for several weeks. Another month-long closure began in September to finish construction of the expanded Westlake terminal ahead of the first arena events in late October. The monorail reopened on October 11, 2021, with work completed on the renovated Westlake Center terminal, which is planned to handle up to 3,000 passengers per hour during events. The project was primarily funded by $6.6 million in private spending and a $5.5 million grant from the Federal Transit Administration. A renovation of the Seattle Center terminal is scheduled to be completed in late 2027. It is planned to replace the superstructure and also add an accessible entrance, platform screen doors, and an extended roof.

Since the opening of Climate Pledge Arena, monorail ridership has recovered to its pre-pandemic levels with more use outside of the peak tourist season. On June 29, 2023, a set of 16 monorail columns on 5th Avenue between Olive Way and Vine Street were painted with portraits of Major League Baseball (MLB) players and local sports fans. The murals by artist Brady Black were commissioned by tourism agency Visit Seattle to celebrate the 2023 MLB All-Star Game, which Seattle hosted in July. Black and several volunteers painted the portraits onto mural cloth and transferred them to vinyl to be installed by crane on the columns. An additional 14 columns were decorated in 2024 with linocut artwork from local students that depict local events and attractions in Seattle.

== Expansion proposals ==
The monorail has been the subject of several expansion proposals, with the primary goal of expanding it into a citywide rapid transit system. In 1961, businessman Ben B. Ehrlichman proposed that the then-unfinished monorail be extended north to Alderwood Manor or Mountlake Terrace and south towards Seattle–Tacoma International Airport, Kent, and Renton. The initial system would have cost $60 million ($481 million in 2024 dollars), while a second line serving the Eastside region would be built separately using a new floating bridge. Former Seattle Transit System manager Marmion D. Mills proposed his own monorail system in 1963 that would connect Seattle to Mountlake Terrace, Kent and the airport. Mills argued that a conventional subway system would be too expensive for Seattle and that the other alternative would be an expanded freeway network.

The Forward Thrust program included a ballot measure that would build a conventional rapid transit system serving King County with federal funding, but voters rejected it in 1968 and 1970. The designers of the rapid transit proposal considered extending the monorail across a regional network, but found it would not have the capacity or flexibility provided by conventional trains. In 1976, ABAM Engineers drew up a regional monorail plan for the Puget Sound Council of Governments, the regional planning authority. The firm, which designed the Walt Disney World Monorail System in Florida and several automated people mover systems for U.S. airports, envisioned an 83-mile (134 km) network with 41 stations and 700 monorail vehicles that would cost $500 million to build ($2.14 billion in 2024 dollars). The PSCOG did not submit the proposal for further consideration.

The city government announced its own plan in 1970 to extend the monorail to a parking garage on Mercer Street near the site of a proposed stadium, but it was shelved after a different site was chosen for the stadium. The Seattle city government commissioned a new study in 1979 to examine improvements to the monorail system, including a closed loop around the Seattle Center campus and an infill station in the Denny Regrade neighborhood. A full conversion into an automated people mover with smaller vehicles was also studied as part of the improvement program. The 1970s energy crisis and subsequent availability of federal funding for transit projects sparked a revived interest in the monorail, but the Urban Mass Transit Administration rejected the Seattle proposals.

=== ETC and Seattle Monorail Project ===
Map of the Seattle Monorail Project's 2002 network proposal

The Regional Transit Authority (later Sound Transit) was formed in 1993 to create a regional light rail plan that was ratified by voters in November 1996. Taxi driver Dick Falkenbury conceived a separate proposal in 1996 to build a citywide monorail system and submitted a ballot initiative after a signature-gathering campaign. Falkenbury's proposal envisioned an X-shaped system with service from Downtown Seattle to Ballard, Lake City, the Rainier Valley, and West Seattle, which would cost $850 million to construct ($1.56 billion in 2024 dollars). 53 percent of voters approved the monorail plan, named Initiative 41, in a general election on November 4, 1997, creating the Elevated Transportation Company (ETC) to seek financing.

The city government appointed a board for the ETC (later renamed the Seattle Monorail Project) and funded early planning work, but did not agree to fund a $4 million feasibility study in 2000. The original monorail initiative was repealed and replaced by a new plan approved by voters in November 2000, which included $6 million for a study. The first corridor, the 14-mile (23 km) "Green Line" from West Seattle to Ballard, was estimated to cost $1.75 billion; a motor vehicle excise tax would fund it. The tax was adopted through a ballot measure that voters narrowly approved in the November 2002 election, creating the Seattle Popular Monorail Authority to manage the program.

The monorail project initially attracted two bids led by Hitachi and Bombardier, but both pulled out in April 2004 over cost concerns and the availability of local contractors. The project was stymied by tax revenue that was lower than expected and design changes to keep construction costs within the proposed budget and open by 2009—a two-year delay from the original plan. A recall measure on the November 2004 ballot aimed to prevent monorail construction, but voters rejected it, allowing the expansion project to continue. The monorail operator reached a tentative agreement with Cascadia Monorail to build the system in June 2005 but had not published the full financial analysis required by the city government before construction was permitted to begin. A revised cost estimate of $11 billion, including debt payments until 2050, was unveiled later that month and withdrawn by the Seattle Monorail Project after public criticism from elected officials.

The monorail project, including a $4.9 billion financing plan for a 10-mile (16 km) line, was abandoned after a fifth ballot initiative in November 2005, when 64 percent of voters rejected it. The Seattle Monorail Project was formally dissolved in January 2008, having spent $124.7 million on planning and property acquisition. The Green Line corridor from West Seattle to Ballard was later included as a light rail project in the Sound Transit 3 ballot measure, which was passed by voters in 2016. The light rail line, scheduled to open in the 2030s, incorporated some elements from the monorail plan into its early project feasibility studies.

== Accidents and incidents ==
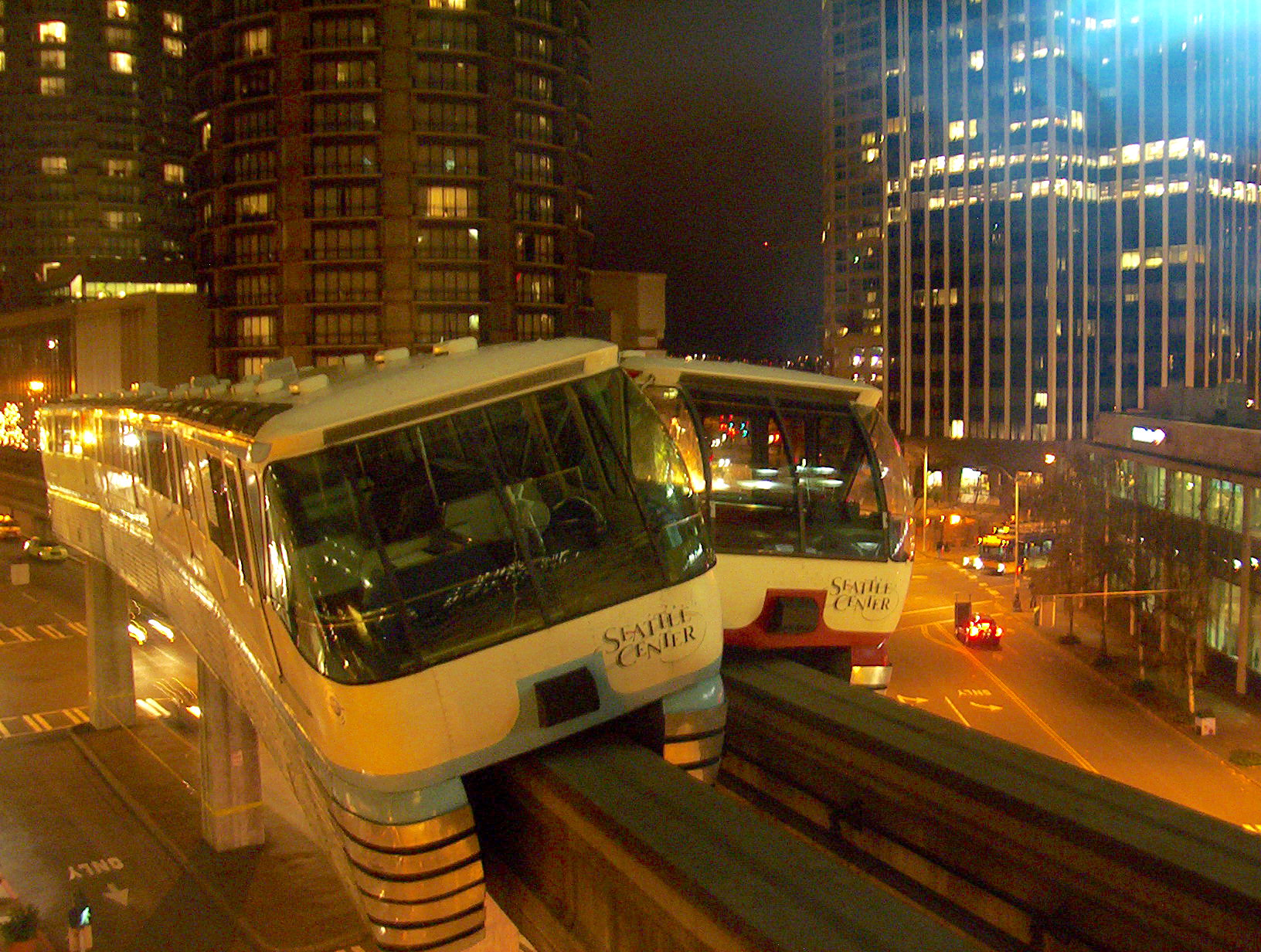
Aftermath of the November 2005 collision near the Westlake Center terminal in Downtown Seattle

On October 20, 1962, the penultimate day of the Century 21 Exposition, the red train struck a bumper stop at the Westlake terminal—the first accident on the monorail system. None of the 400 passengers were injured, but the train's window and nose were damaged, requiring a patch and two hours of repairs before returning to service. The red train was damaged in a similar manner on August 14, 1963, striking the Westlake terminal's bumper while on a test run after the first set of brakes failed.

The first major accident involving the monorail occurred on July 25, 1971, when a brake failure on the red train caused it to strike a girder at the end of the track in the Seattle Center terminal. The train struck the girder at 15 to 20 mph (24 to 32 km/h), injuring 26 of 40 passengers. The red train was lifted off the track and moved to a Seattle Transit System maintenance facility in August for a complete rebuild of the front car at a cost of $100,000 (equivalent to $592,000 in 2024 dollars). This was completed in June 1973 with the help of translated blueprints from Alwac. One maintenance worker was killed during the repairs after falling into a pit under the vehicle.

A similar incident on the blue train occurred on May 21, 1979, injuring 15 people at the Seattle Center terminal. The monorail's brake system was not found to be at fault, but the disabling of the onboard speed control system was criticized by city officials. The monorail struck a bumper at the temporary downtown terminal on August 27, 1987, causing no injuries but breaking the glass window, which fell onto a parked car below. The incident was later blamed on driver error.

On May 31, 2004, a fire broke out on the blue train as it passed through the Experience Music Project with 150 people aboard; eight suffered minor injuries. Passengers were evacuated using ladders deployed by the Seattle Fire Department to the red train, which traveled back to the Seattle Center terminal. The fire was determined to have been caused by a snapped drive shaft that damaged a collector shoe, which began to short circuit. The electric current melted through the shoe's aluminum housing and arced, causing sparks that ignited the undercarriage's grease and oil, creating a fire that entered the interior and ignited the seat cushions. The red train re-entered service on December 16, while the blue train returned on May 2, 2005, after extensive repairs.

The two monorail trains clipped one another on the curve above 5th Avenue and Olive Way near the Westlake Center terminal on November 26, 2005, at around 7:10 p.m. The southbound blue train's driver caused the collision when they failed to yield while entering a gauntlet track north of Westlake created by the 1988 renovation. The two trains carried 84 passengers who were evacuated using firetruck ladders, including two people hospitalized with minor injuries. Within a week, the trains were separated and towed via crane to the Seattle Center terminal to undergo extensive repairs that cost $4.64 million ($6.93 million in 2024 dollars), funded through an insurance payout and contributions from the federal government and the private monorail operator. Instead of using a traditional contractor, the Seattle Opera props department constructed a new set of nine aluminum doors—eight for the red train and one for the blue train—at their Renton warehouse. The monorail was expected to resume service on July 18, 2006, but problems found during last minute testing delayed the resumption of service to August 11.

On July 31, 2023, a male 14-year-old from Phoenix, Arizona, was fatally struck by the monorail near the intersection of 5th Avenue and Denny Way around 9:00 p.m. According to the Seattle Police Department, security footage showed he had been tagging an adjacent building from a roof when he was struck, which caused him to fall.

== In popular culture ==
Along with the Space Needle, the Seattle Center Monorail is considered an iconic landmark of the city of Seattle and is among the most popular tourist attractions in the state. It was featured in the 1963 musical film It Happened at the World's Fair, which starred Elvis Presley and was filmed during the Century 21 Exposition. The monorail and Space Needle were depicted on the cover of Life magazine and on commemorative stamps and coins issued during the world's fair in 1962. The Monorail Espresso coffeehouse was named in honor of the monorail and originally began under the Westlake terminal in 1980 as the first downtown coffee cart.

== See also ==
- Transportation in Seattle
- List of monorail systems
