= Seattle Monorail Project =

Proposed expansion of Seattle monorail

The Seattle Monorail Project was a proposed five-line monorail system to be constructed in Seattle, Washington, US, as an extension of the existing Seattle Center Monorail. The 14-mile (23 km), 17 station Green Line running from Ballard to West Seattle via Seattle Center would have been the first of the five lines to be built.

From 1997 to 2005 the monorail project was a highly contentious political issue in the Seattle area. In November 2005, following the fifth voter initiative on the monorail in eight years, the monorail authority agreed to dissolve itself after having spent $124.7 million in taxpayer funds without beginning any monorail construction.

== History ==
=== Initiative 41 and ETC ===
The effort to extend the monorail began in 1997 with Initiative 41, passed by a 53%–47% vote by Seattle citizens. The initiative proposed a 54-mile (87 km) X-shaped monorail system extending the 0.96-mile (1.54 km) line constructed for the 1962 Seattle World's Fair. The system's construction and operation was to be carried out by a new agency, the Elevated Transportation Corporation (ETC), using private funding.

The ETC quickly determined that private entrepreneurs could not build a monorail system without public financial support, leading to a second monorail referendum placed before voters as Initiative 53 in 2000, which would allow the ETC to spend $6 million for additional studies to determine an improved monorail plan with full cost estimates and a funding package to pay for construction. I-53 passed 56% to 44% in 2000.

=== Five-line plan ===
Map of proposed lines and Green Line stations for the Seattle Monorail Project

By 2002, the ETC had developed the five-line system plan that came to be called the Seattle Monorail Project. This proposal was put before the voters as Citizens Petition #1 in November 2002 which would propose to dissolve the ETC, create a new monorail agency, construct the Green Line as the first part of the system, and enact an annual 1.4% motor-vehicle excise tax (MVET) on Seattle vehicles to fund the project.

The 2002 petition drew opposition from former mayors Wes Uhlman and Charles Royer. Other opponents criticized the proposal for not attracting new riders, instead drawing them from existing King County Metro buses, as well as the obstruction of views along the corridor. The proposed elevated line with 7-foot (2.1 m) deep concrete beams on Second Avenue in downtown would create a "wall" through the urban core; other critics proposed moving the corridor to the Interstate 5 corridor.

Reflecting the increased opposition, Citizens Petition #1 narrowly passed in November 2002 by just 877 votes, 50.2% to 49.7%. With the passage of CP-1, construction was scheduled to begin in autumn 2005, and be completed in 2009.

Just two years later in November 2004, a recall initiative, I-83, was put on the ballot seeking to halt the project by forcing the city to deny the monorail agency the right to use the air space above public city streets. This fourth initiative in seven years proved unpopular with Seattle voters however, and lost 64% to 36%.

=== Financial issues ===
The tax to fund the project began effective June 2003, and was levied annually on each car registered in the city based on the MSRP of the vehicle and a fixed depreciation table. In 2005, the average monorail tax per vehicle was $130 annually.

The project soon fell under intense public scrutiny, as actual revenue from the motor vehicle excise tax came in 30% under projections while projected costs rose by 10%. To bridge the shortfall, the SMP initially proposed extending the tax and bond repayments over a 50-year time horizon, resulting in nearly $9 billion in interest paid on the $2 billion construction cost. The plan to extend the tax proved highly controversial and five days later the SMP withdrew its financial plan and the director and board chairman resigned under pressure.

=== Loss of city support and closure ===
Seattle Mayor Greg Nickels gave the board an ultimatum to create a new financial plan or lose city support for the project. A new plan was not developed, and on September 16, 2005, Nickels withdrew city support for the project. While the city of Seattle could not officially stop the project, it could withhold permission to build on or above city land, as had been proposed under I-83 a year earlier. Nickels also called on the Seattle Monorail Project to put a measure on the November 2005 ballot to determine whether or not to continue with the project, marking the fifth time Seattleites would vote on the issue. This measure shortened the initial phase of the Green Line to 10.6 miles (17.1 km) with the remaining 3.4 miles (5.5 km) to be added later, and the SMP said it would dissolve itself if the measure failed.

Proposition 1 was defeated, 65% to 35%, and in response the SMP reduced staff, terminated the annual motor vehicle excise tax on Seattle vehicles effective June 30, 2006 (three years after it was first implemented) and began liquidating properties already purchased for the Green Line.

The Seattle Monorail Authority was formally dissolved on January 17, 2008, after liquidating all of its assets, repaying its debts, and transferring its remaining $425,963.07 to the King County Metro system. The monorail project ultimately cost Seattle taxpayers $124.7 million.

== Design ==
The plan, as proposed by CP-1 (2002) proposed five distinct corridors based on the Intermediate Capacity Transit Study and prioritized the Green Line, a north–south route on the west side of the city, as the first of the five to be built. The other four lines included two additional north–south routes, in the center (Blue) and east (Gold) sides of the city, and two east-west connectors, one just north of the Lake Washington Ship Canal (Purple) and the other near the southern city limits (Red). Two future extensions were proposed to the Green Line, one each on the north and south ends.

By 2004, more formal Second Phase plans were developed; the Blue line was cut back and did not cross the Duwamish, but the Red line was extended west to meet a new branch of the Blue line running south from Delridge. In addition, an alternative central north–south Rainbow corridor was added, running from downtown to the University District and continuing on to Northgate and Lake City, approximately following the route of I-5.

The agency considered using a proof-of-payment system for fares similar to the SkyTrain in Vancouver.

=== Green Line ===
The proposed Green Line ran mostly north-south from Ballard through Magnolia, Queen Anne, Seattle Center, Downtown, Pioneer Square, Chinatown-International District, then turned west and terminated into West Seattle.

Planned Green Line alignment and stations (2004)
District	Station	Alignment	Location	Notes
Ballard	Crown Hill	single-beam	SW corner of NW 85th St & 15th Ave NW	Northern terminus; switch south of station for a storage tail track
Ballard	NW 65th St	single-beam	SW corner of NW 65th St & 15th Ave NW	Switches north and south of station for dual-beam guideway through station
Ballard	NW Market St	dual-beam (iris/vertical)	NW corner of NW Market St & 15th Ave NW	Switch north of station for dual-beam guideway through station and further south
Ballard Crossing		dual-beam (iris/vertical)	40–50 ft (12–15 m) W of Ballard Bridge	Monorail-only high-level bridge providing 120 ft (37 m) minimum vertical clearance for ship traffic
Interbay	Dravus	dual-beam (horizontal)	Between 15th & 16th Ave NW, West Barrett and West Dravus St	
Interbay	(Operations Center)	dual-beam (horizontal)	West of 15th Ave W, north of W Armory Way	Approximately 7-acre (2.8 ha) site for operations & maintenance
Interbay	Blaine	dual-beam (horizontal)	West of 15th Ave W, south of W Blaine St	Future infill station; potential connection to Sounder commuter rail service
Interbay	Elliott/Mercer	dual-beam (horizontal)	East of Elliott Ave W, between W Mercer St & 6th Ave W	
Seattle Center / Queen Anne / Belltown	Seattle Center/ Queen Anne	dual-beam (horizontal)	NW corner of KeyArena, E of First Ave N	Serving events at KeyArena and Seattle Center
Seattle Center / Queen Anne / Belltown	Seattle Center/ Fifth & Broad	dual-beam (horizontal)	Fifth Ave N, between John and Broad St	Includes switches to facilitate short-turn service between stadiums and downtown Seattle
Seattle Center / Queen Anne / Belltown	Bell St	dual-beam (iris/vertical)	West of Fifth Ave, S of Bell St	
Downtown / Pioneer Square	Fifth & Stewart St	dual-beam (iris/vertical at stations, horizontal between stations)	NW corner of Fifth Ave & Stewart St	Connection to Downtown Seattle Transit Tunnel
Downtown / Pioneer Square	Pike Place Market	dual-beam (iris/vertical at stations, horizontal between stations)	W of Second Ave, between Pine and Pike St	Serving Pike Place Market
Downtown / Pioneer Square	Madison	dual-beam (iris/vertical at stations, horizontal between stations)	W of Second Ave, between Madison and Spring St	Connection to Colman Dock ferry terminal
Downtown / Pioneer Square	Yesler	dual-beam (iris/vertical at stations, horizontal between stations)	W of Second Ave, at Yesler Way	
Pioneer Square / Chinatown–International District / SoDo	King/Weller	dual-beam (horizontal)	S of the South Weller Street Pedestrian Bridge	Serving Pioneer Square / Chinatown–International District neighborhoods and event crowds at the Washington State Convention Center and Safeco Field
Pioneer Square / Chinatown–International District / SoDo	Safeco Field	dual-beam (horizontal)	E of Safeco Field	On WSDOT property
Pioneer Square / Chinatown–International District / SoDo	Lander	single-beam	NE corner of First Ave S & S Lander St	Switches north and south of station for dual-beam guideway through station
Duwamish Crossing		single-beam	Above center median of West Seattle Bridge	Flanked by switches on the east and west to transition to dual-beam guideway
West Seattle	Delridge	dual-beam (horizontal)	NE corner of steel plant site	
West Seattle	Avalon	dual-beam (horizontal)	West of 35th Ave SW near SW Oregon St	
West Seattle	Alaska Junction	dual-beam (vertical)	West of 42nd Ave SW between SW Alaska & SW Edmunds St	
West Seattle	Morgan Junction	single-beam	West of California Ave SW between SW Eddy St & SW Beveridge Pl	Southern terminus; switch north of station for tail track storage

=== Planned expansion ===
Updated (2004) map of the Seattle Monorail Project, including refinements to the Second Phase corridors

Future extensions on the Green Line could have taken it east (from the north terminus at Crown Hill) to Northgate and south (from the south terminus at Morgan Junction) to the Vashon Island Ferry Terminal. These were later designated the Pink North and South Corridors, approximately 6.1 and 1.6 mi (9.8 and 2.6 km), respectively.

Additional planned lines included:

- Gold: north–south, connecting Lake City, UW, Capitol Hill, Chinatown-International District, and Downtown. Multiple alignments and phases were studied.
  - Alternative 1: 2nd & Madison to Montlake, 3.5 mi (5.6 km)
  - Alternative 2: Chinatown–ID to Broadway & Roy, 2.0 mi (3.2 km)
  - Alternative 3: Chinatown–ID to 23rd & Madison, 2.6 mi (4.2 km)
  - Alternative 3A: Chinatown–ID to U-Village, 5.6 mi (9.0 km)
  - Alternative 4: Chinatown–ID to Rainier, 4.2 mi (6.8 km)
  - Alternative 5: Rainier Valley Center to Lake City, 11.6 mi (18.7 km)
  - Alternative 5A: Rainier Valley Center to U-Village, 7.3 mi (11.7 km)
- Purple: east–west, connecting Shilshole and Magnuson Park
  - Purple Segment 1: Ballard to Children's Hospital, 4.5 to 5.3 mi (7.2 to 8.5 km)
  - Purple Segment 2: Children's Hospital to Sandpoint, 2.3 mi (3.7 km)
- Blue: north–south, connecting Greenwood, Fremont, Downtown, SODO, South Park, and Georgetown
  - Blue North: Bitter Lake to downtown via Aurora
  - Blue South (4th): South Park to downtown
  - Blue South (Delridge): Westwood/Highland Park to Delridge (Green Line station)
- Red: east–west, connecting South Park and the Rainier Valley (outside Seattle city limits; preliminary work only)
- Rainbow: north–south, connecting downtown to the University District, with two potential extensions continuing on toward the north:
  - Extension 1: U-District to Northgate
  - Extension 2: U-District to Lake City

== See also ==
- Seattle Streetcar – a project whose first line was built during the time when the monorail would have been built
- Link light rail – a light rapid transit project executed by Sound Transit in the Seattle area. The first line in Seattle, Central Link, began service in 2009, with expansion to the University of Washington completed in 2016.
