= Seattle International Foundation =

The Seattle International Foundation is a grant-making organization whose mission is to support Seattle-area nonprofit organizations engaged in international development, with a strategic focus on Central America.

== History ==
The Seattle International Foundation was founded in 2006 by Bill Clapp and Paula Clapp to support Seattle's expanding international aid sector.

== Projects ==
Bill Clapp has lobbied the U.S. federal government on behalf of Seattle International Foundation and Global Washington to sustain United States foreign aid.
