= Global Washington =

Coordinates: 47.610082°N 122.334143°W

- Formation: December 2008
- Founders: Seattle International Foundation, University of Washington, and Washington State University
- Dissolved: June 2026
- Type: NGO
- Legal status: 501(c)(3)
- Purpose: humanitarian
- Location: Seattle, Washington
- Website: globalwa.org

Global Washington was a Seattle-based nonprofit membership association whose mission was to promote international development by coordinating the efforts of other globally-minded philanthropic, research and business organizations in Washington state. In June 2026, the organization closed.

== History ==
Global Washington was founded in December 2008 by the Seattle International Foundation, the University of Washington, and Washington State University. Kristen Dailey, formerly of Initiative for Global Development, became the association's executive director in May 2014.

== Organization ==
=== Advocacy ===
In 2008 the United States Federal Government budgeted about US$30 billion for foreign aid and of that, about 8 billion was for healthcare. Global Washington criticized this budget for neglecting development.

Global Washington has organized conferences to discuss how United States foreign aid should be distributed. Past conferences that were organized in the past include:

- 2019 – Goalmakers
- 2018 – Next 10 Global
- 2017 – Renewing Global Leadership
- 2016 – Allies for Action
- 2015 – Disruptive Development
- 2014 – Smarter Approaches to a Changing World
- 2013 – Catalyzing Collective Impact
- 2012 – Redefining Development: From Silos to Collective Impact
- 2011 – Opportunities and Obstacles in Turbulent Times
- 2010 – Bridges to Breakthroughs: How Partnerships and Innovation are Changing the World
- 2009 – A Blueprint for Action

=== Members ===
Global Washington was made up of various member organizations as well as implementing partners.

Notable members included:

- Amazon
- AmeriCares
- APCO Worldwide
- Ashesi University
- Avanade
- Bill & Melinda Gates Foundation
- BuildOn
- CARE
- ChildFund
- Concern Worldwide
- Covenant House
- Days for Girls
- Emirates
- F5, Inc.
- Fred Hutchinson Cancer Research Center
- Girl Rising
- Global Impact
- Heifer International
- The Hunger Project
- International Rescue Committee
- Landesa
- Malaria No More
- Mercy Corps
- Microsoft
- Mifos Initiative
- Mission Africa
- Mona Foundation
- NetHope
- Opportunity International
- OutRight Action International
- Oxfam America
- PATH
- Planned Parenthood Federation Great Northwest, Hawai'i, Alaska, Indiana, Kentucky
- PricewaterhouseCoopers
- Save the Children
- Seattle Foundation
- Seattle International Foundation
- Seattle Pacific University
- Seattle University
- Starbucks
- Tostan
- UNICEF USA
- University of Washington
  - Daniel J. Evans School of Public Policy and Governance
  - Henry M. Jackson School of International Studies
- VillageReach
- WaterAid
- World Affairs Council of Seattle
- World Concern
- World Justice Project
- World Vision International

Former members include Alaska Airlines, American Cancer Society, American Red Cross, Breakthrough, the Center for Infectious Disease Research, Eastern Washington University, Global Brigades, Global Peace Foundation, Highline College, JPMorgan Chase, Kids In Need of Defense (KIND), Lane Powell PC, Northwest School Seattle, NPH USA, Restless Development, University of Washington Bothell, and World Relief Seattle.
