= Seattle Foundation =

Seattle Foundation is the community foundation serving the greater Seattle area. Established in 1946, it is the oldest community foundation serving the Pacific Northwest, with assets of more than $965 million. As of 2017, it was the 21st largest community foundation in the United States.

== Services ==
Under the leadership of its president and CEO Tony Mestres, Seattle Foundation offers an array of philanthropic services, including collective grant-making and impact investing. In 2013, the foundation awarded grants of more than $65 million. It has worked with Seattle and King County, Washington lawmakers on civic initiatives to increase voter turnout and provide services to immigrants and refugees.

== GiveBIG ==
Seattle Foundation's annual GiveBIG, a 24-hour online giving campaign designed to support King County and Washington state nonprofit organizations, has raised more than $100 million from 400,000 individual donations to nearly 1,600 different organizations since 2011. In its sixth year, GiveBIG was extended an extra 24 hours due to technical difficulties with Kimbia, the fundraising platform used by dozens of community foundations across the country on May 3, 2016. The foundation's eighth and final GiveBIG campaign was held on May 9, 2018.

- June 23, 2011: $3.6 million
- May 2, 2012: $7.4 million
- May 15, 2013: $11.1 million
- May 6, 2014: $12.9 million
- May 5, 2015: $16.3 million
- May 3–4, 2016: $22 million
- May 10, 2017: $19 million
- May 9, 2018: $16.6 million

In November 2018, Seattle Foundation announced that GiveBIG 2019 would be run by 501 Commons, a Seattle-based nonprofit consulting service. The campaign was held May 8, 2019, raising $11.4 million.
