= Maria-Josepha-Straße =

Street in Munich, Germany

Maria-Josepha-Straße is a street in Munich's Schwabing district. It runs west of the Englischer Garten from Dillisstraße, or the Nikolaiplatz to the corner of Mandlstraße/Königinstraße, and forms the southern edge of the heritage-protected building ensemble Alt-Schwabing. The name of the street came from Maria Josepha of Portugal, the second wife of Karl Theodor, Duke in Bavaria. The renaming of the street from its originally name, Wiesenstraße, took place in the course of 1891 and was carried out with the incorporation of Schwabing to Munich. Countless streets of the Altschwabinger village center were then given new addresses and names. According to Rambaldi, the street name assignments were officially carried out as early as 1890, and for the postal detection of the buildings along this road, the name had been recognized since 12 November 1892. On city maps from the years 1890 and 1891, the street name was not yet to be found.

At the beginning of Maria-Josepha-Straße is the Seidlvilla (also called Villa Lautenbacher), built in 1905 by Emanuel von Seidl in the style of German Renaissance with Art Nouveau forms. On the Nikolaiplatz is the 1928-1929 designed Fischerbrunnen by Eugen Mayer-Fassold.

At the corner Kaulbach Straße and Maria-Josepha- Straße is a former publishing house of the Bayerischen Telefonbuchverlag (Bavarian telephone book publisher) from the 1950s, which is to be replaced by a complex building with 28 apartments, offices and practices. Further along the street is an office building of Munich Re, which was completed in March 2013 and whose construction was very controversial.

Until the 1960s, the then tram line 22, drove to Schwabing and turned in a loop at Nikolaiplatz. In the curve between the Maria-Josepha-Straße and the Nikolaiplatz, the tram tracks are still visible through holes in the pavement and through the cooling of the asphalt. From here, tracks were also laid for a possible connection through the Englischer Garten.

With the postal address Nikolaiplatz 1b, which is also on the Maria-Josepha-Straße Seidlvilla, as well as the Fischerbrunnen also counted, there are only 9 historically listed buildings on the only 260 m long road, which is also included in the Ensemble protection Altschwabing.

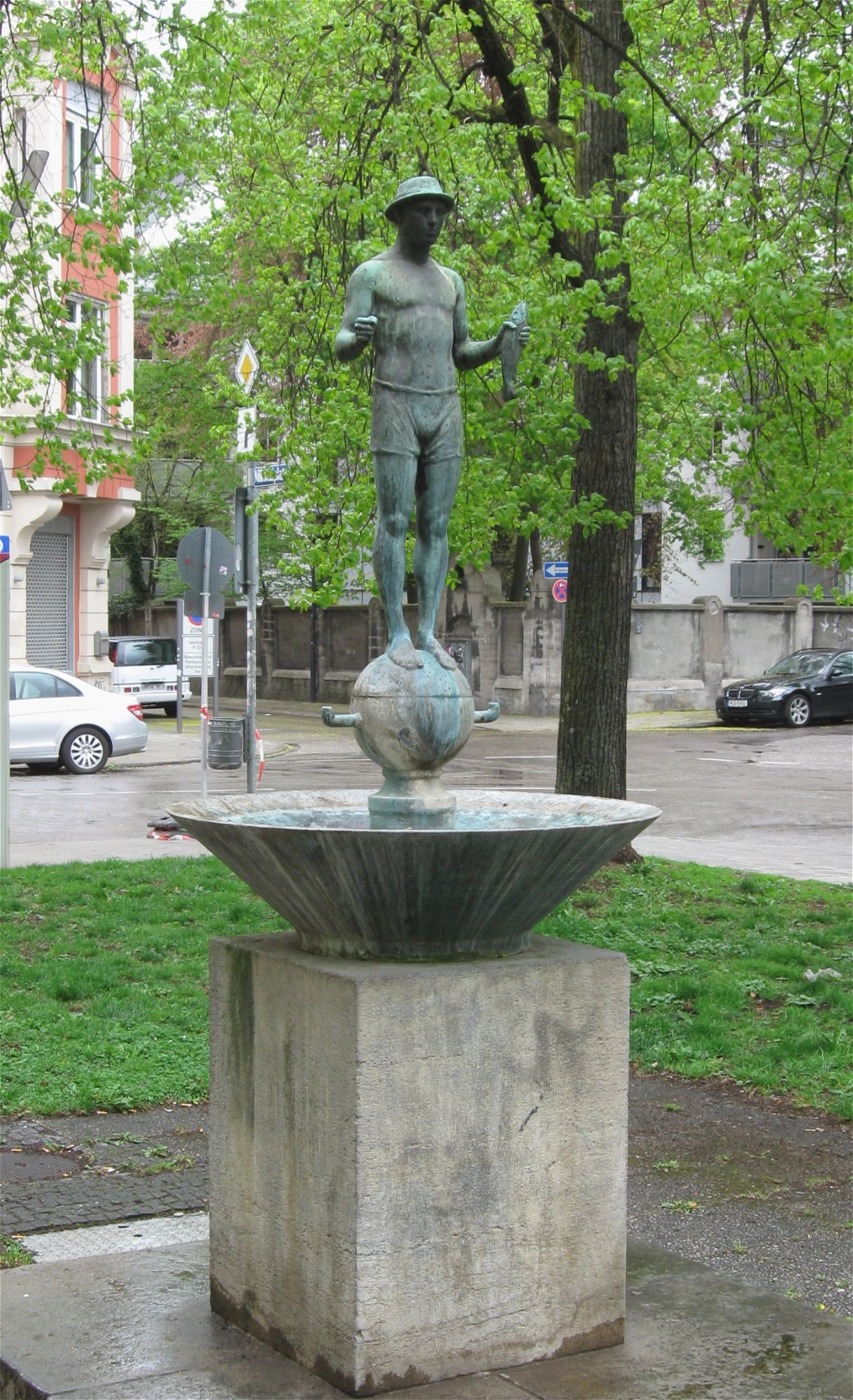
1928-1929 built by Eugen Mayer-Fassold Fischerbrunnen

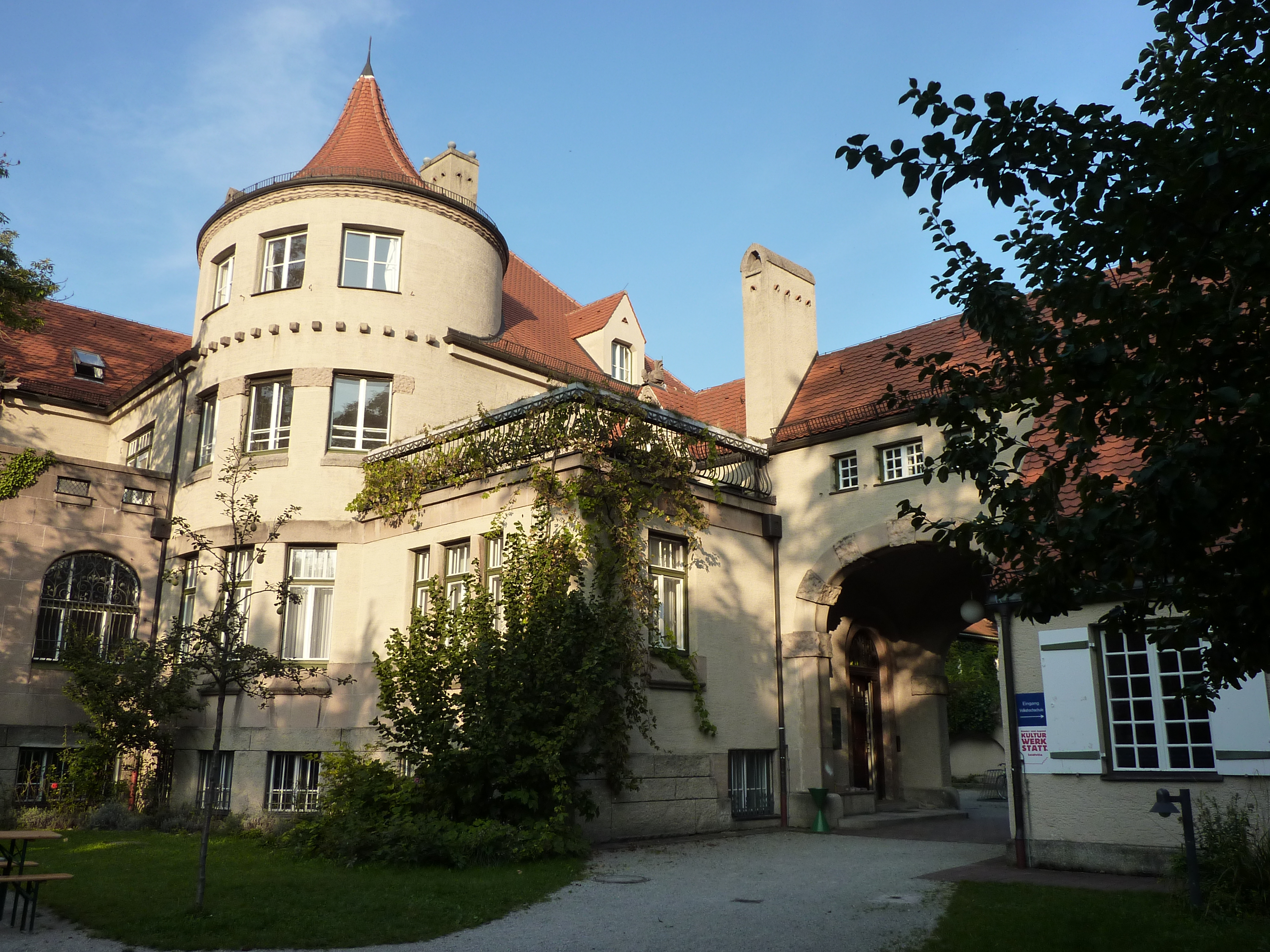
Seidlvilla

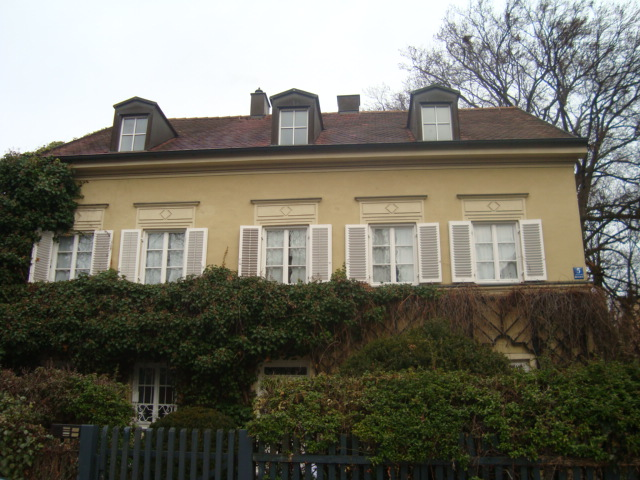
Biedermeier-late-classicist house from the 2nd quarter of the 19th century at Maria-Josepha-Str. 5

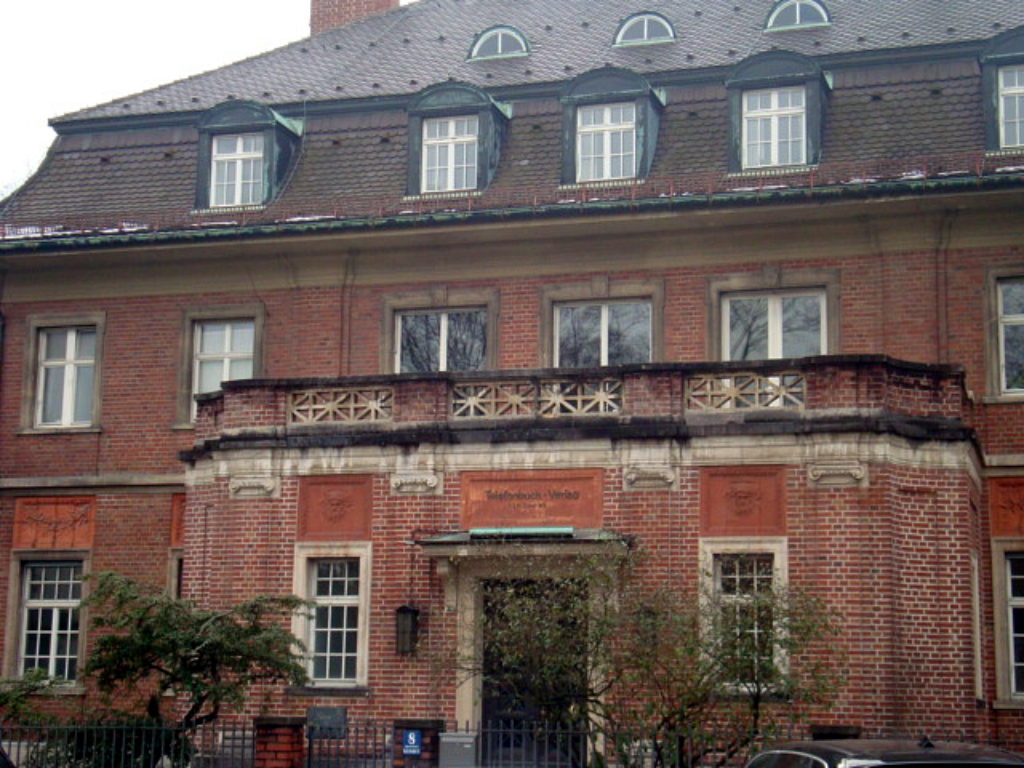
Built in 1909 by Carl Sattler Villa Loeb

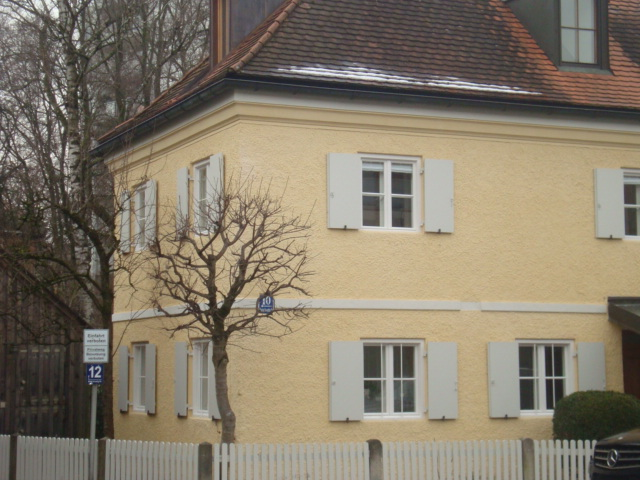
Built in 1800 Hip roof house in Maria-Josepha-Straße 10

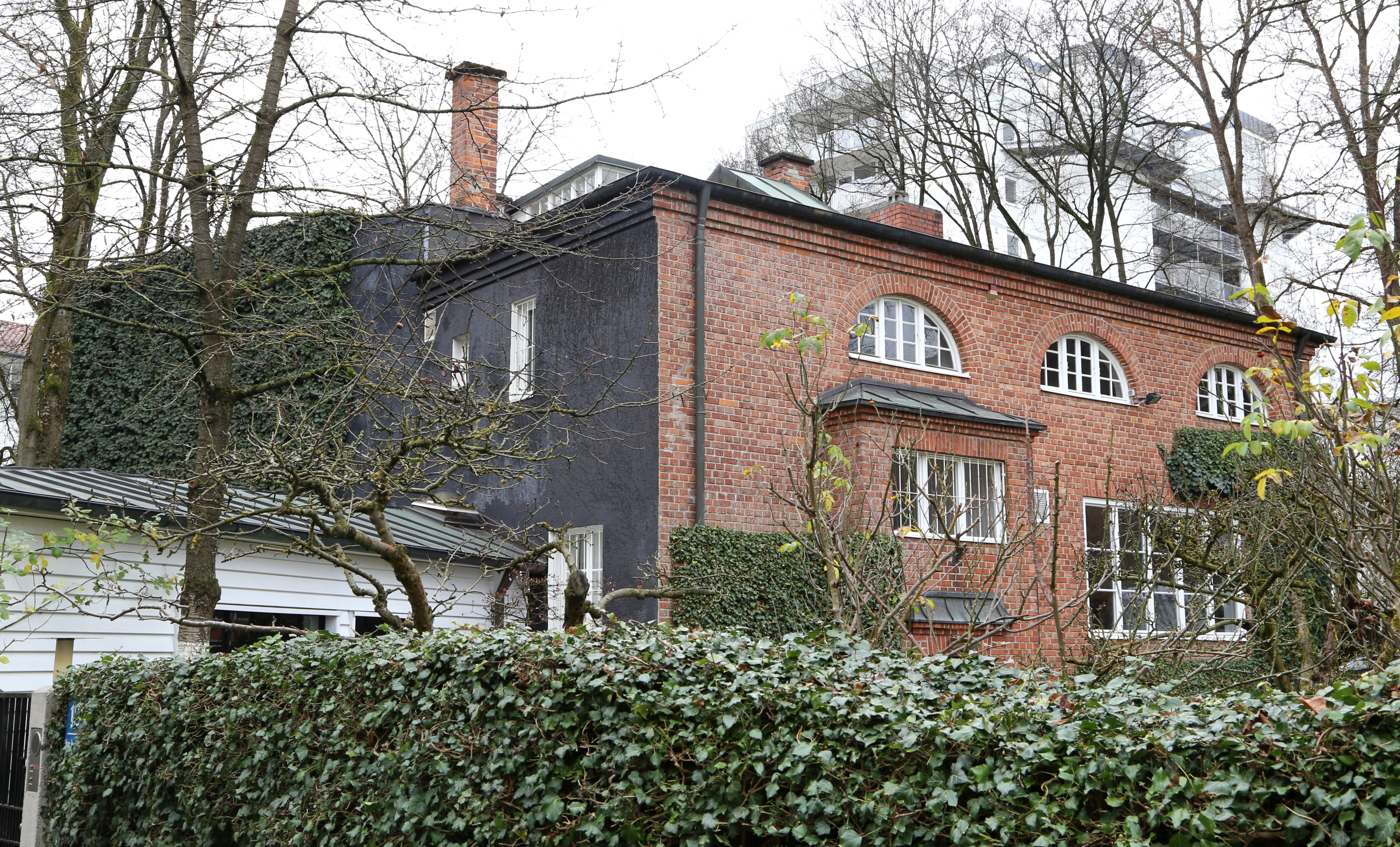
Neoclassical-objective raw brick villa from the beginning of the 20th century at Maria-Josepha-Str. 12

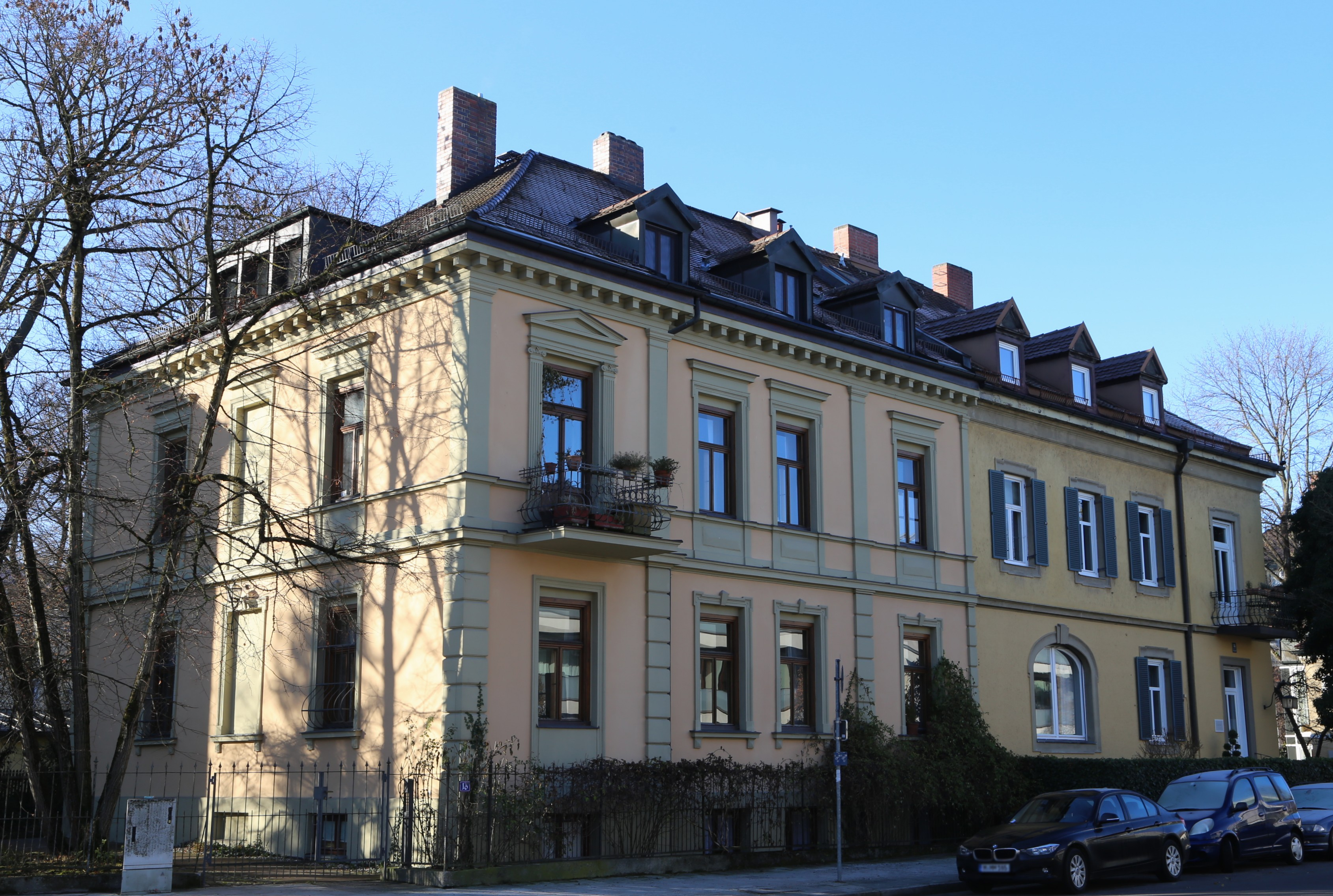
Villa-style semi-detached house in Neo-Renaissance style 1886 at Maria-Josepha-Straße 14-16

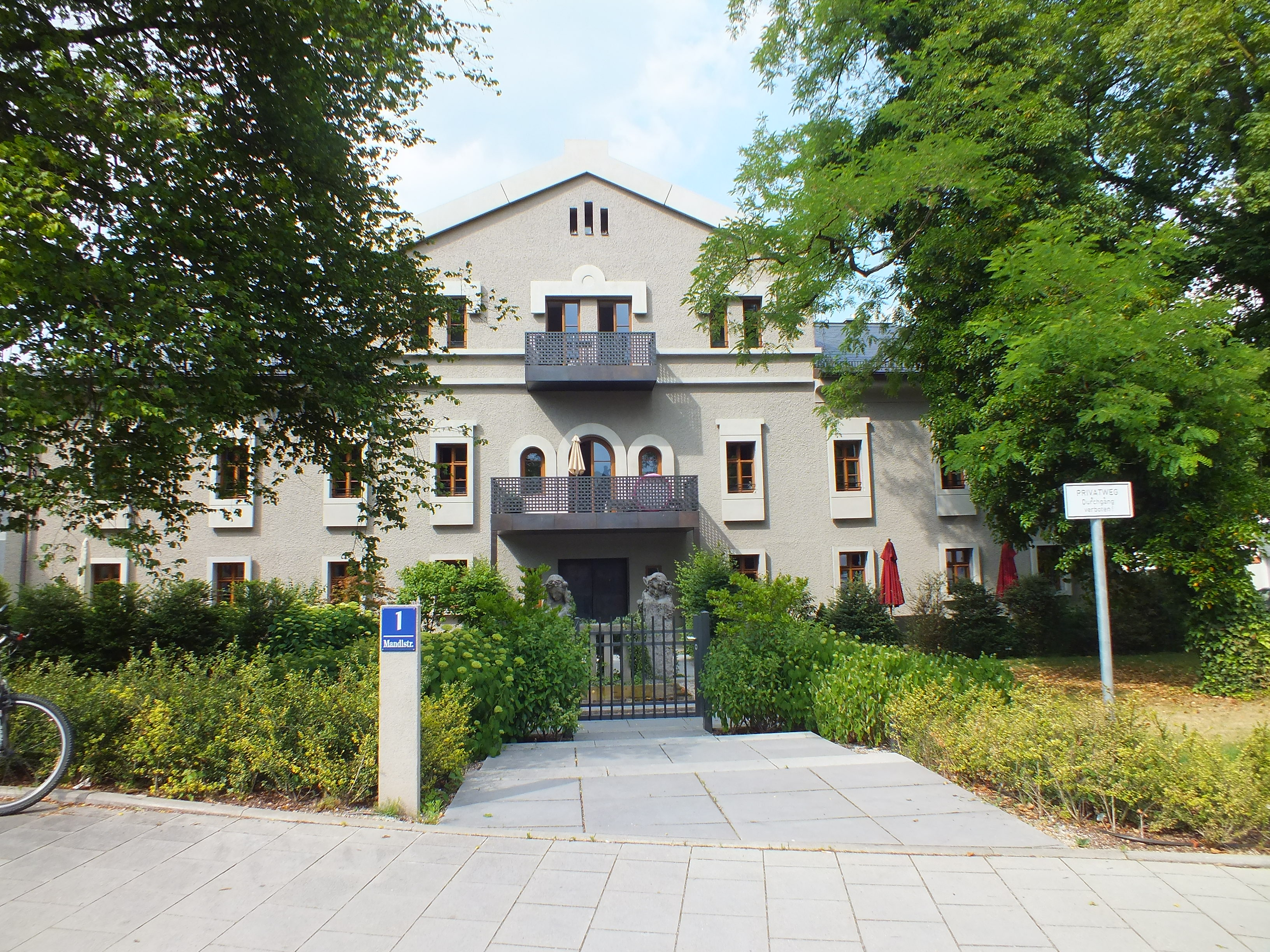
1906/07 built by Frederick of Thiersch Walmdachvilla in Art Nouveau forms in the Mandlstraße 1
