= Mandlstraße =

Street in Schwabing, Munich, Germany

The Mandlstraße is a street in Munich's Schwabing district. It runs west of the Englischer Garten from the corner of Maria-Josepha-Straße / Königinstraße to the corner of Gunezrainerstraße / Biedersteiner Straße and forms the eastern edge of the protected building complex Alt-Schwabing. The street was named after Johann Freiherr von Mandl-Deutenhofer (* 1588; † 12 August 1666), chancellor and president of the court chamber in the service of the Bavarian elector Ferdinand Maria.

The Prestel Publishing is located in Mandlstraße 26, Mandlstraße 14 is the marital room of the Munich branch, and Mandlstraße 23 is the Catholic Academy in Bavaria. There is also an office building of the Munich Re, completed in March 2013, the construction of which was very controversial. Since 2011, a tree-shaped sculpture (discrepancy) made of stainless steel created by American artist Roxy Paine was placed in front of the building.

Lujo Brentano lived at Mandlstraße 5. Albert Langen and Josephine Rensch lived at Mandlstraße 8, as well as Olaf Gulbransson, draftsman of the satirical magazine Simplicissimus from April 1905. In 1902 the painter Max Nonnenbruch acquired the house at Mandlstraße 10. In today's Mandlstraße 26 lived Alfred Kubin, the graphic artist, from 1904 to 1906, and Alexander Eliasberg lived in the house number 24. The inhabitants of Mandlstraße from late May to late November 1942, included Sophie Scholl as well as Willi Graf and his sister Anneliese. The Austrian conductor Felix Weingartner also lived on Mandlstraße, as did photojournalist Thomas Hoepker.

A total of fifteen historically-protected objects are located along the 350-meter-long road, including the route to the Ensembleschutz Altschwabing (E-1-62-000-4).

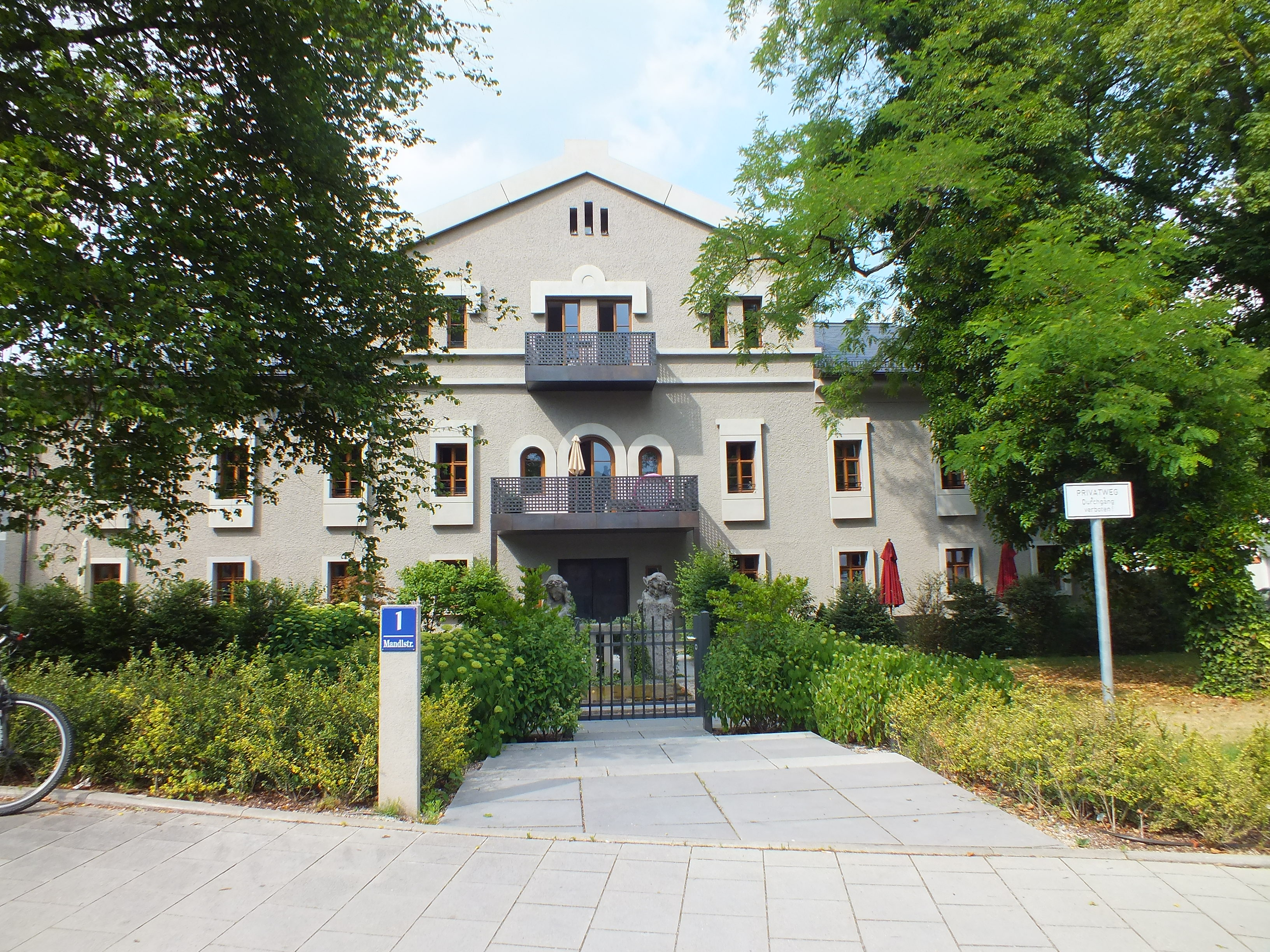
1906/07, Friedrich von Thiersch built a youthfully designed hipped roof house in the Mandlstraße 1, in front of it is a 1907 designed fountain from Mathias Gasteiger with two youthful figures.

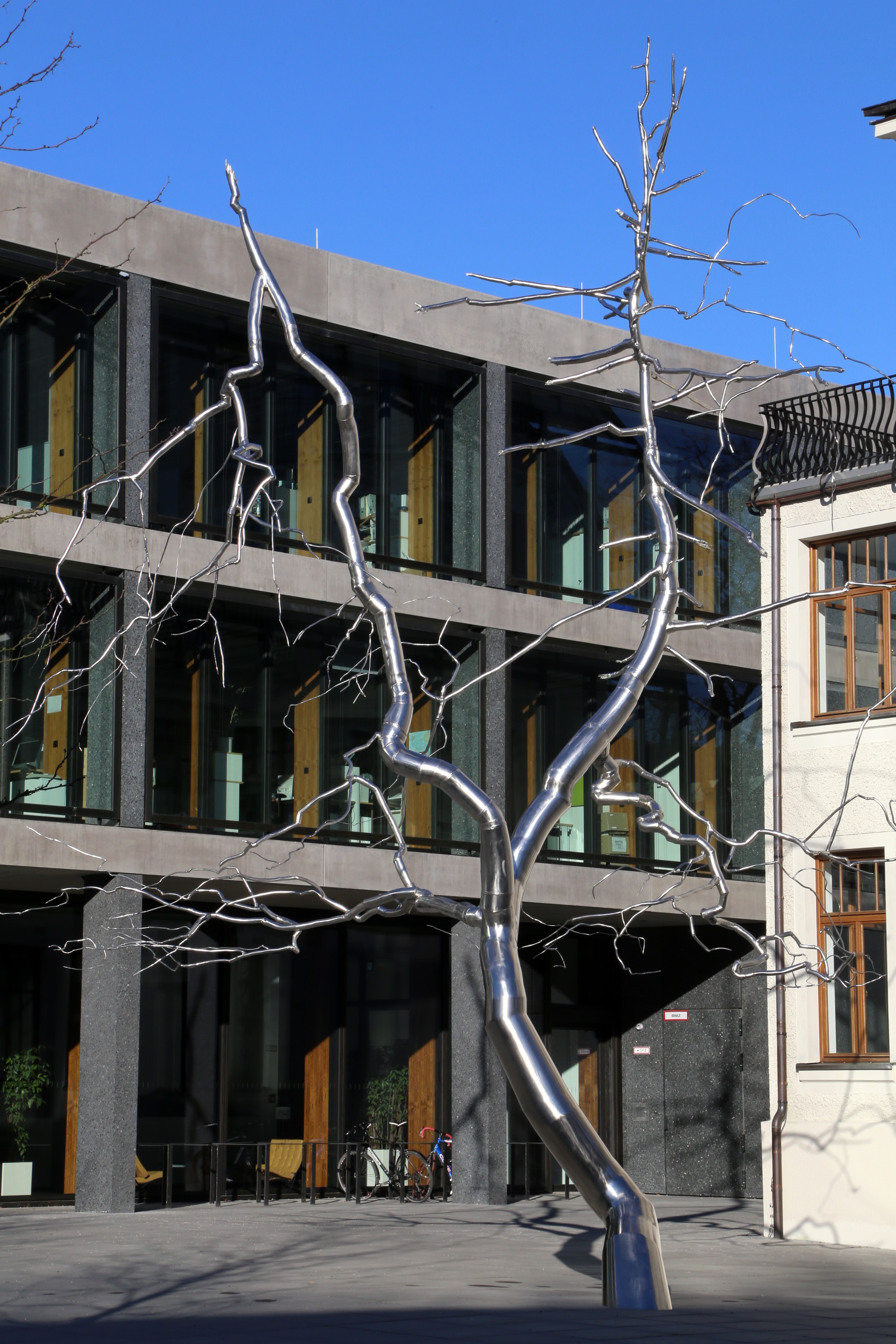
2011 designed stainless steel sculpture "Discrepancy" in front of Mandlstraße 3 (Munich Re) by Roxy Paine

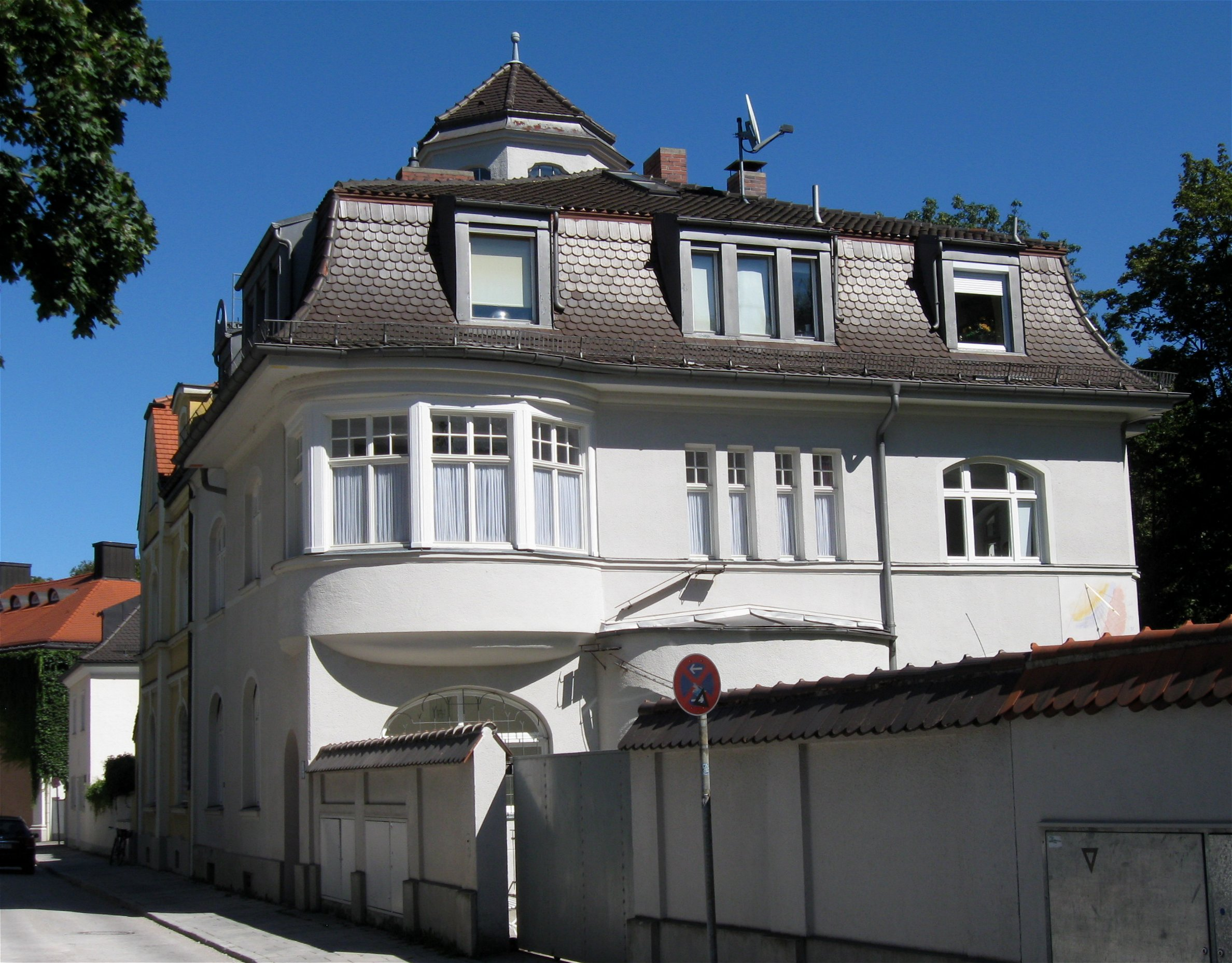
Block of two villas in Mandlstraße 8/10, where Olaf Gulbransson lived from 1905

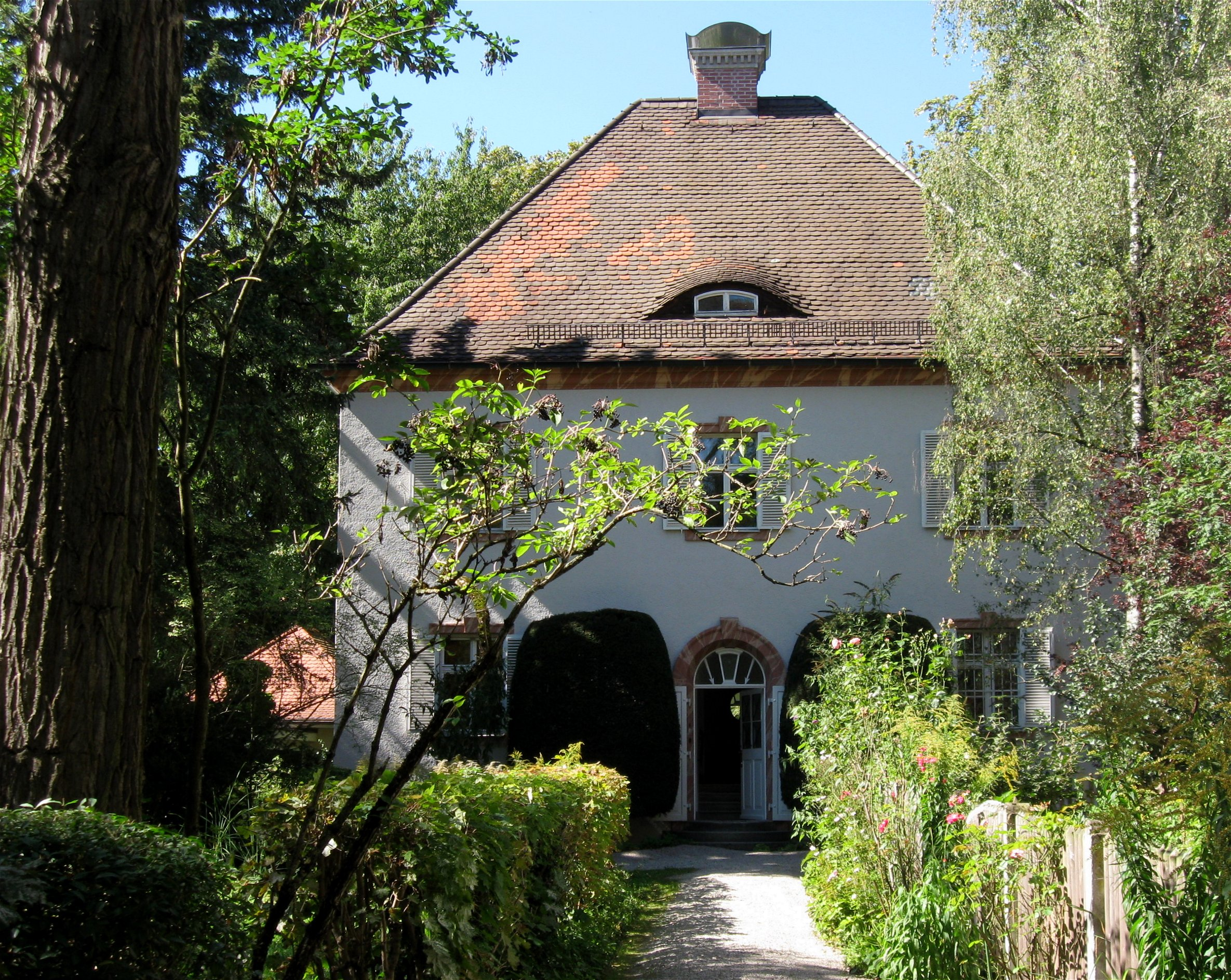
Built in 1925 by Theo Lechner and Fritz Norkauer, two-storey hipped roof villa

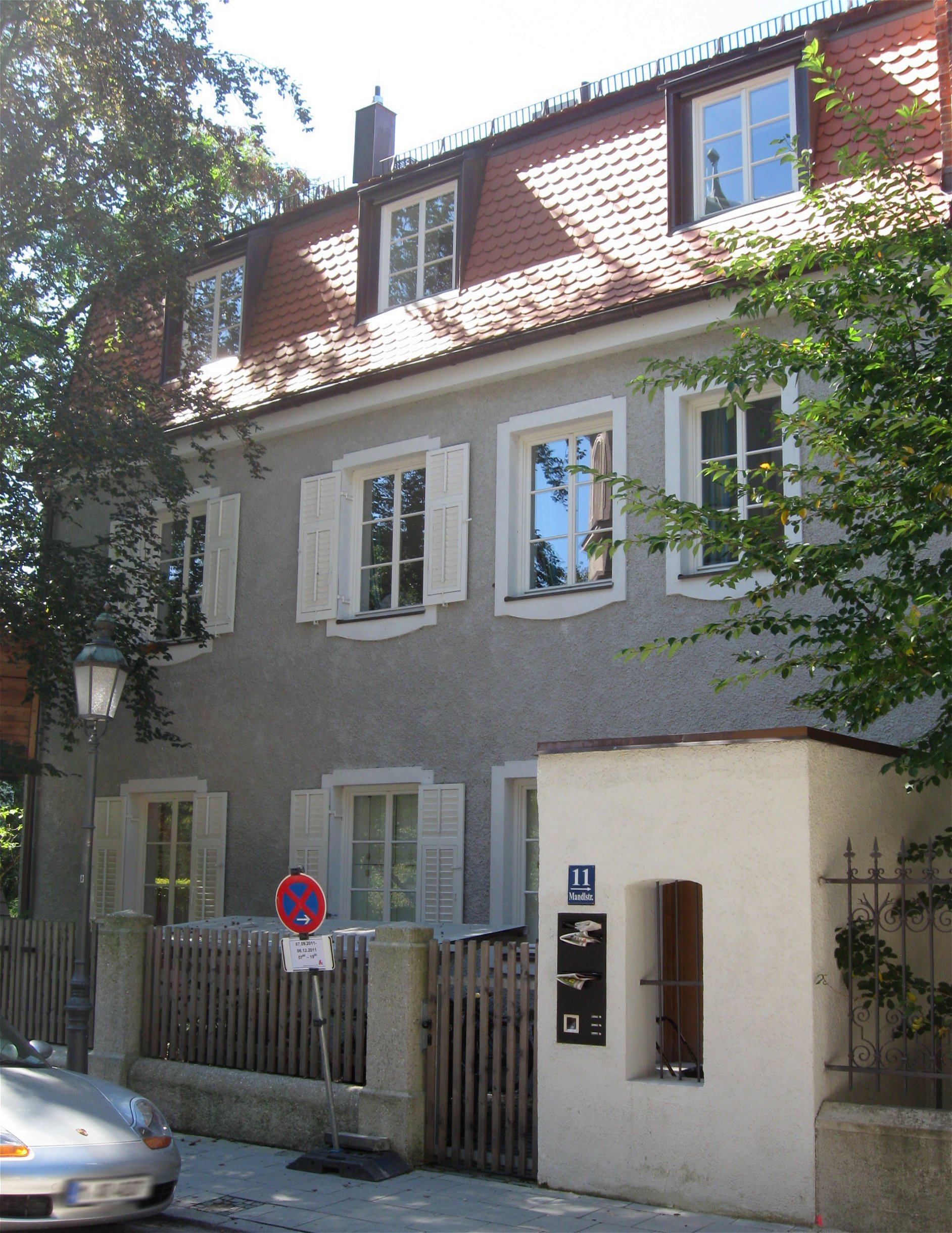
neoclassical house from the second half of the 19th century in Mandlstraße 11

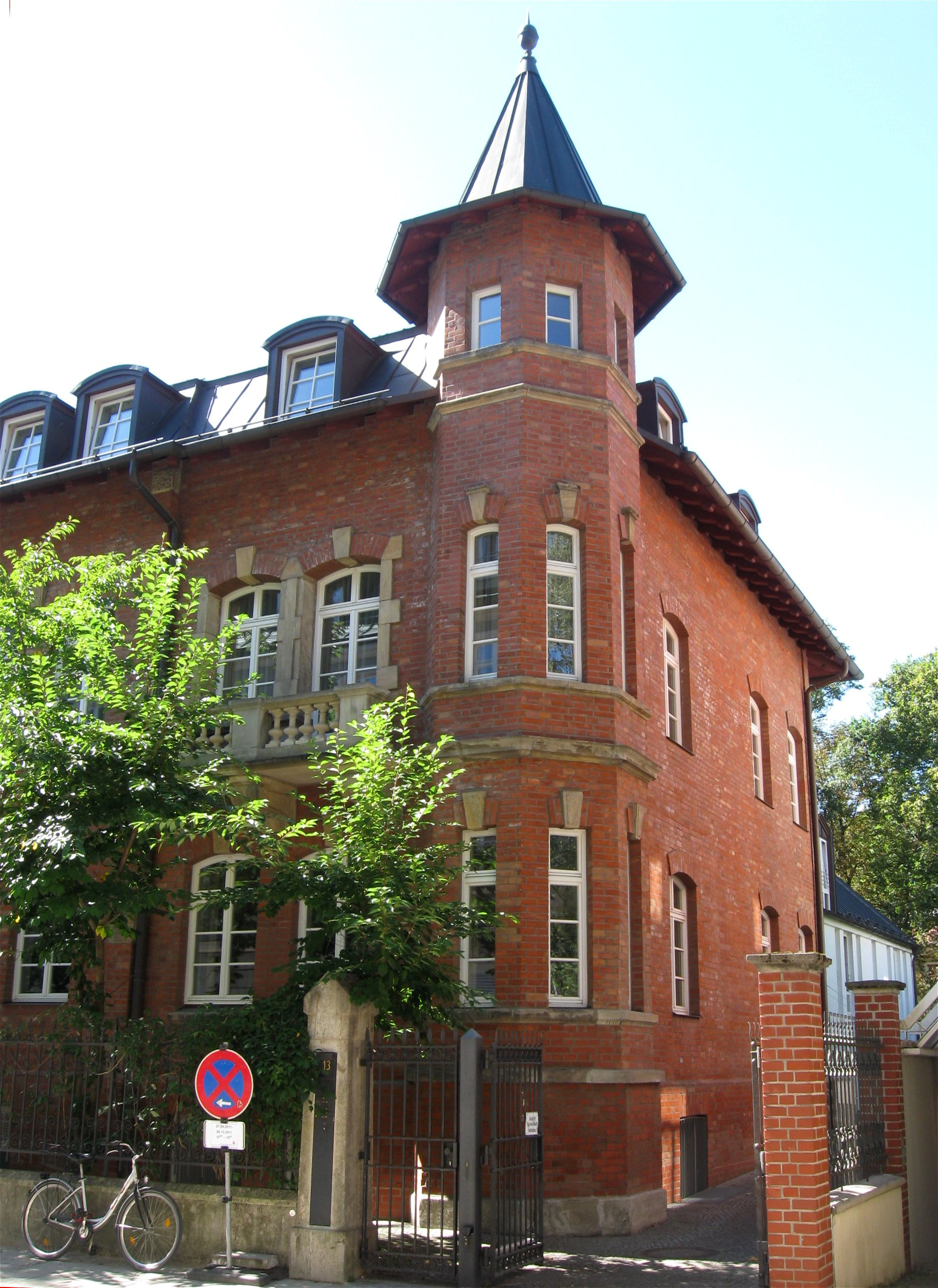
Built in the end of the 19th century, the Rohbackstein-Neurenaissance-Villa is located in Mandlstraße 13

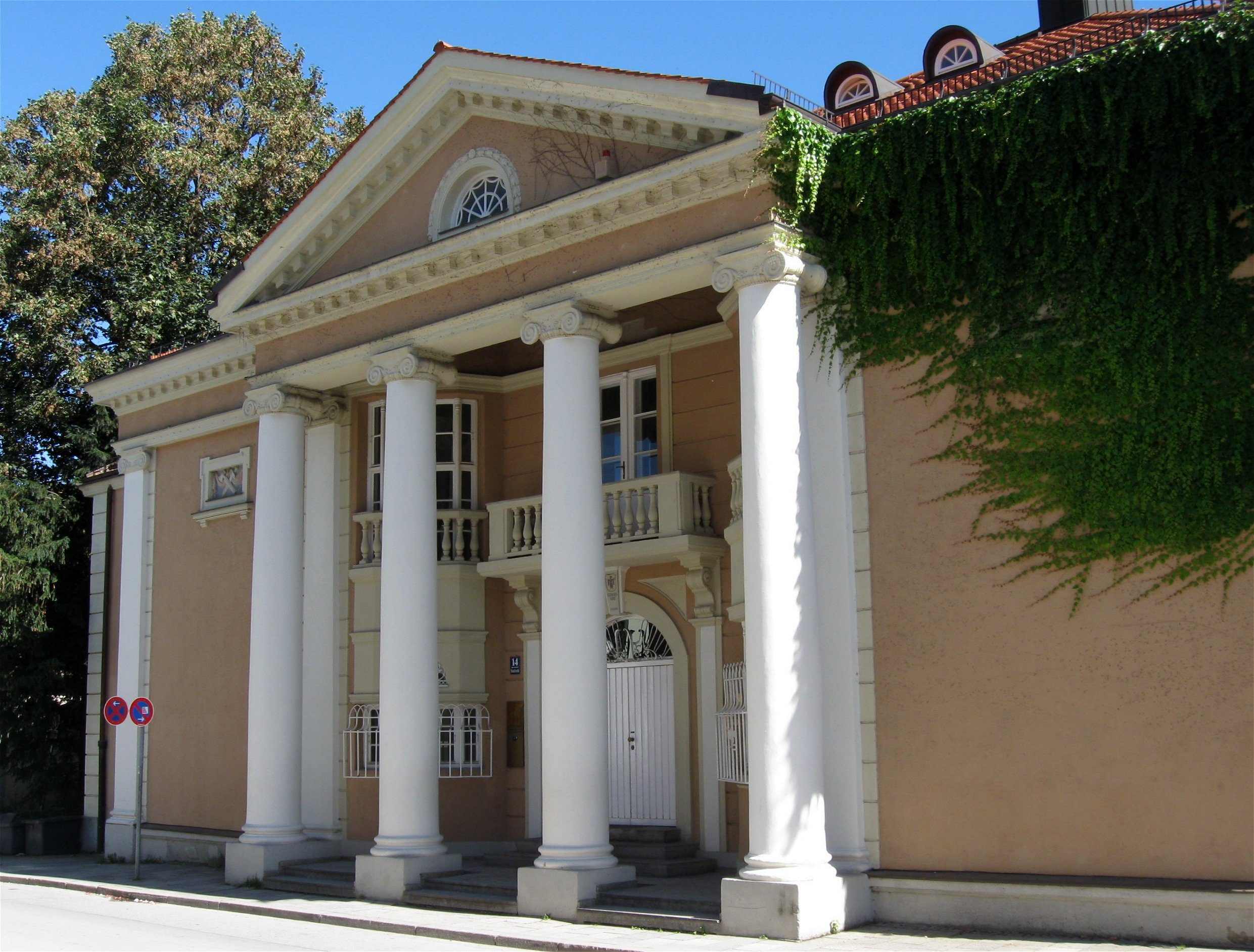
1922-23 neoclassical portico villa built by Ed. Hoffmann at Mandlstrasse 14, the ceremony room of the Munich justice of the peace office

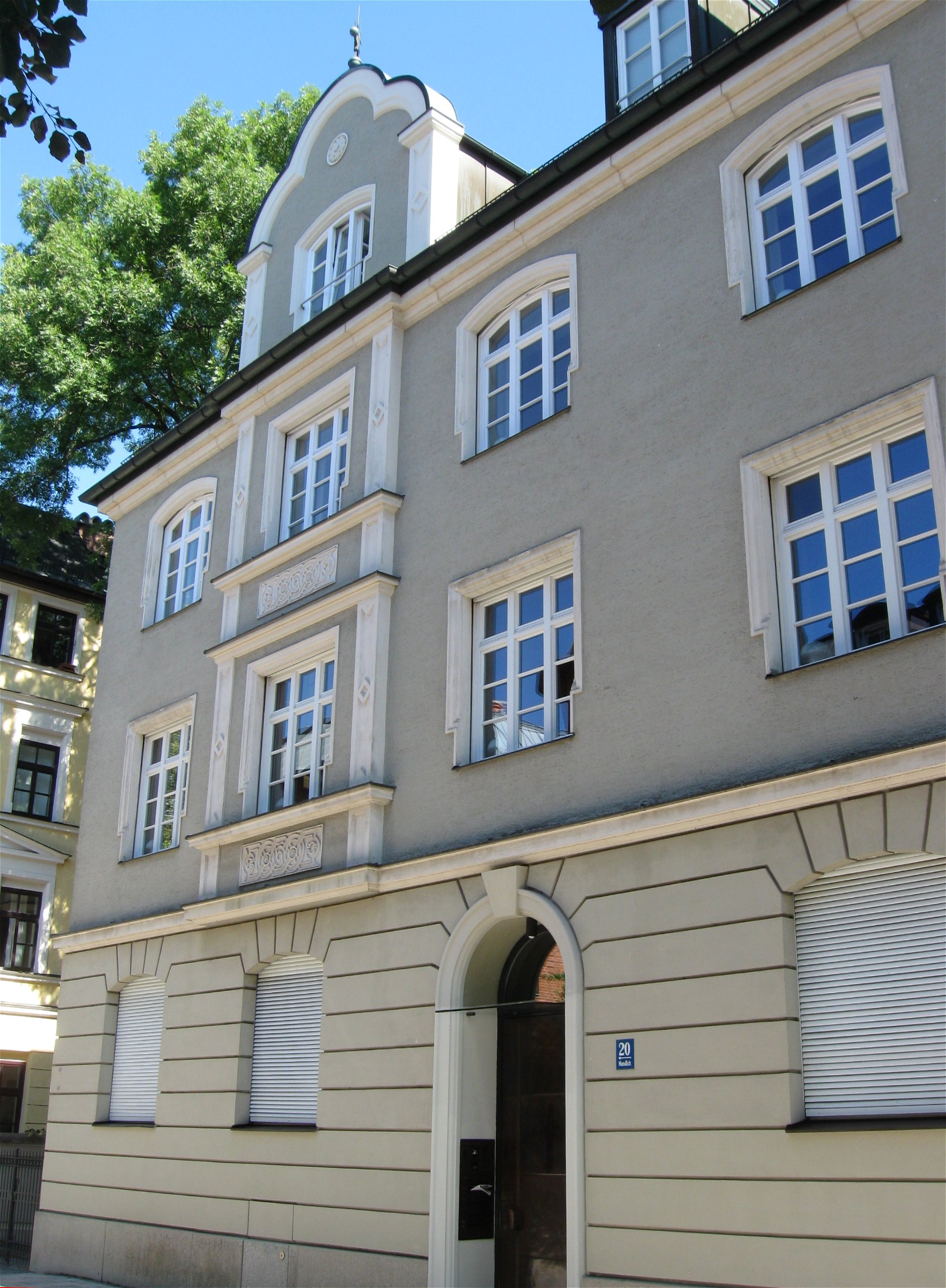
Private clinic Carolinum in Mandlstraße 20

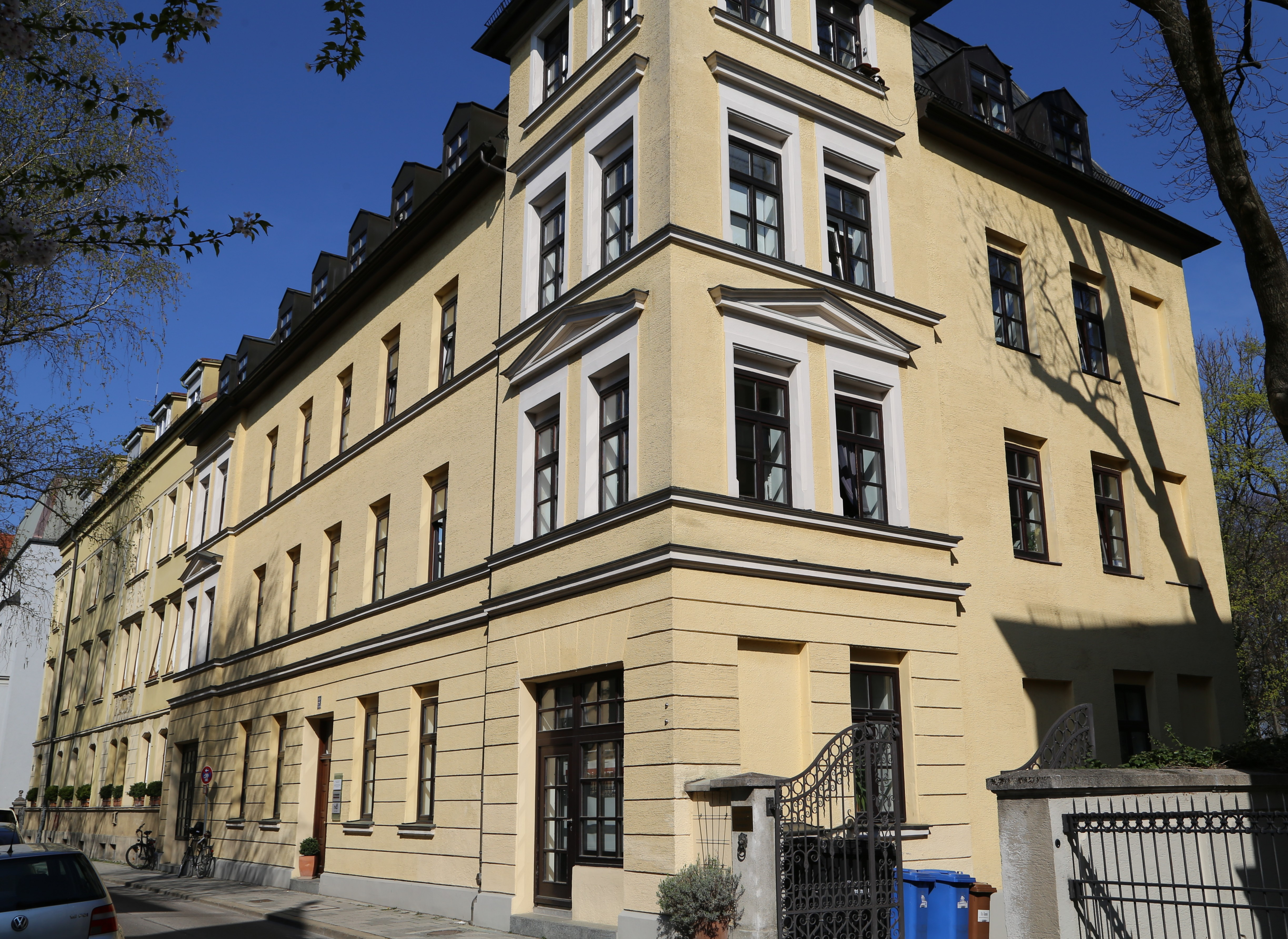
Built in the end of the 19th century, the Neo-Renaissance building at Mandlstraße 22

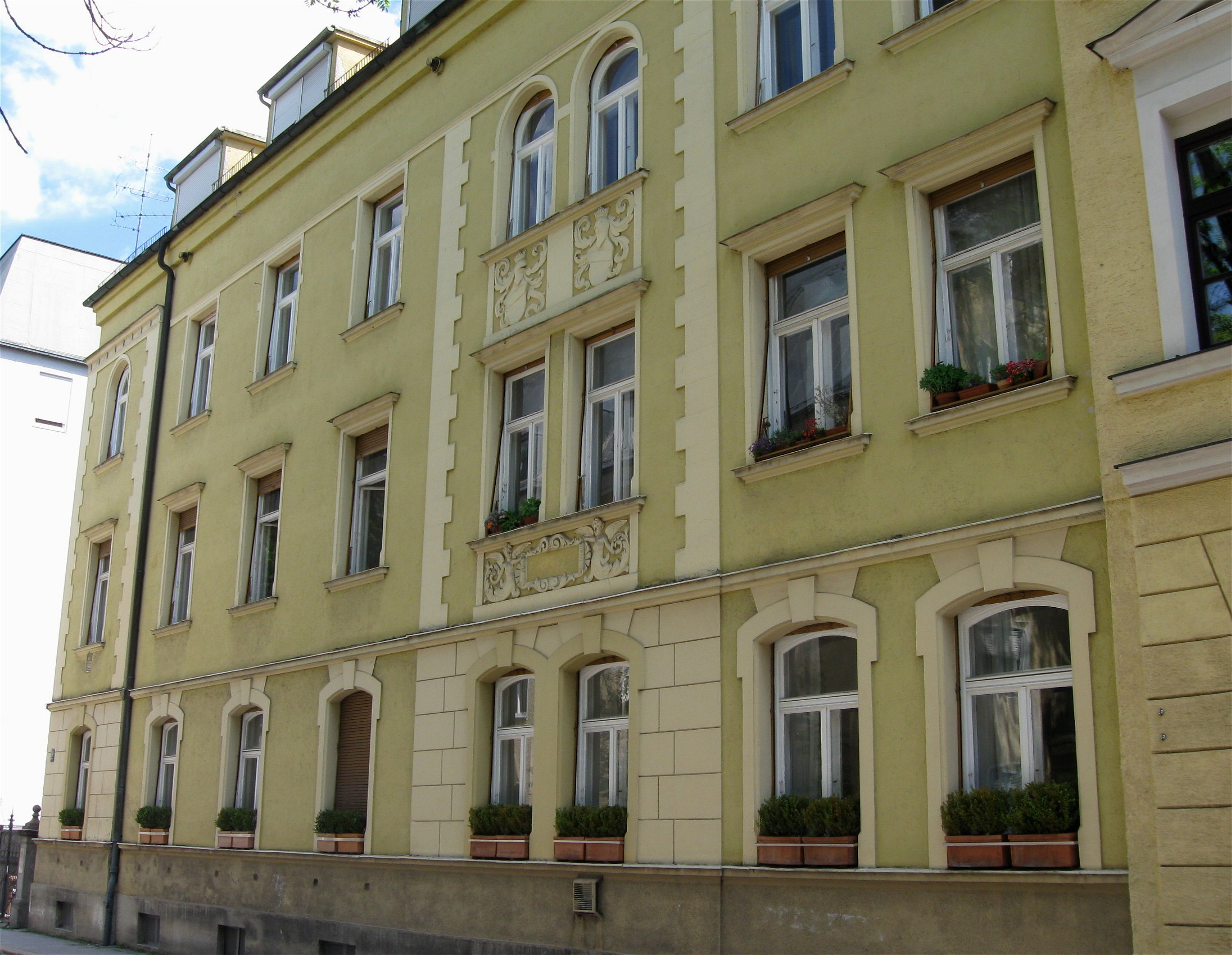
1901 building constructed in the style of the German Renaissance in the Mandlstraße 24, temporary apartment of Alexander Eliasberg

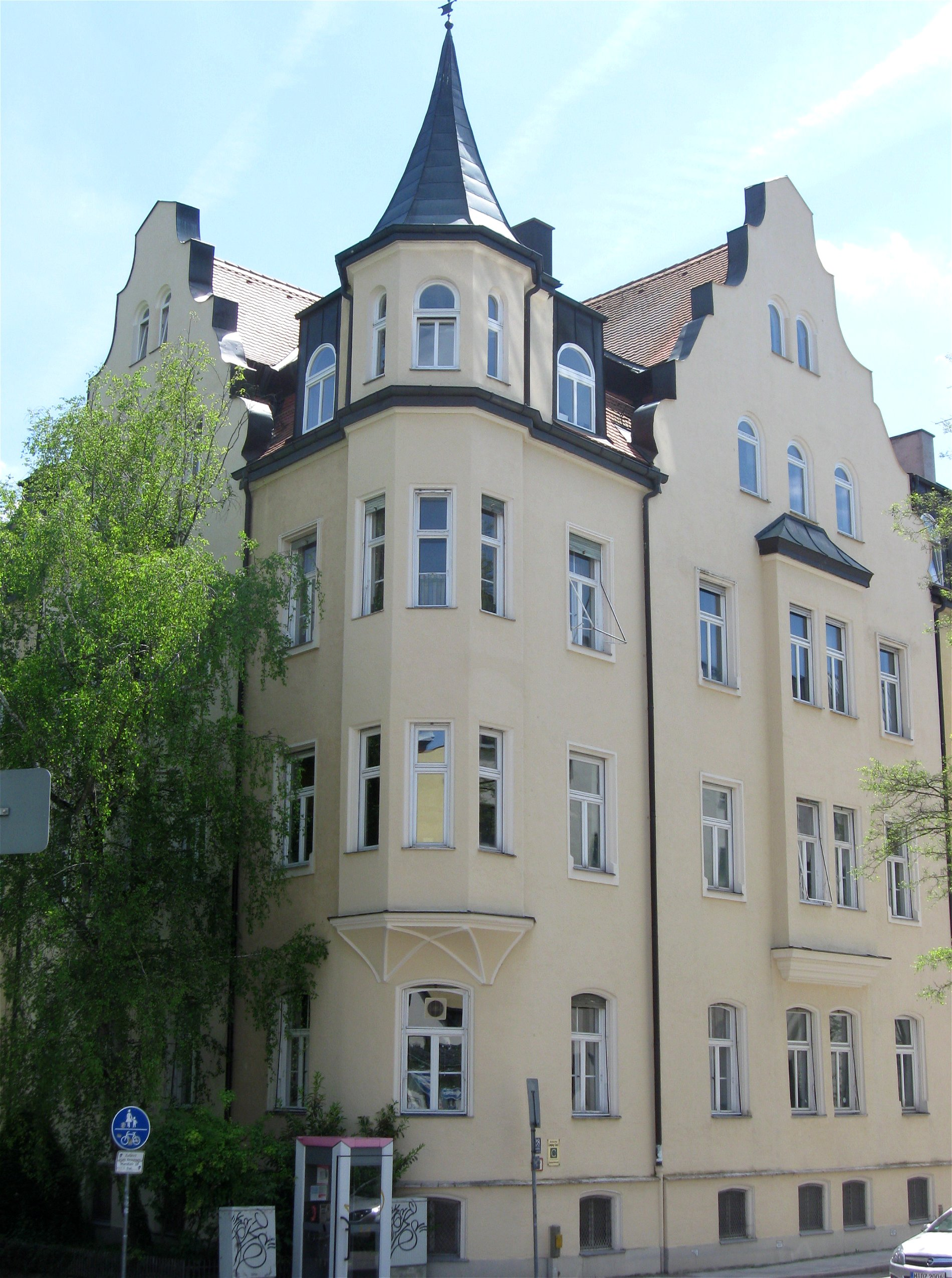
Around 1900 built gothic corner building in the Mandlstraße 28, headquarter of the German camping club

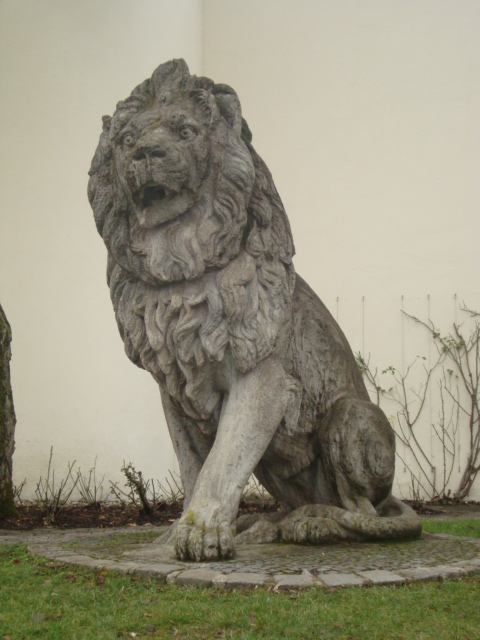
Lion in front of the Catholic Academy in Mandlstraße 23
