= Königinstraße =

Street in Munich, Germany

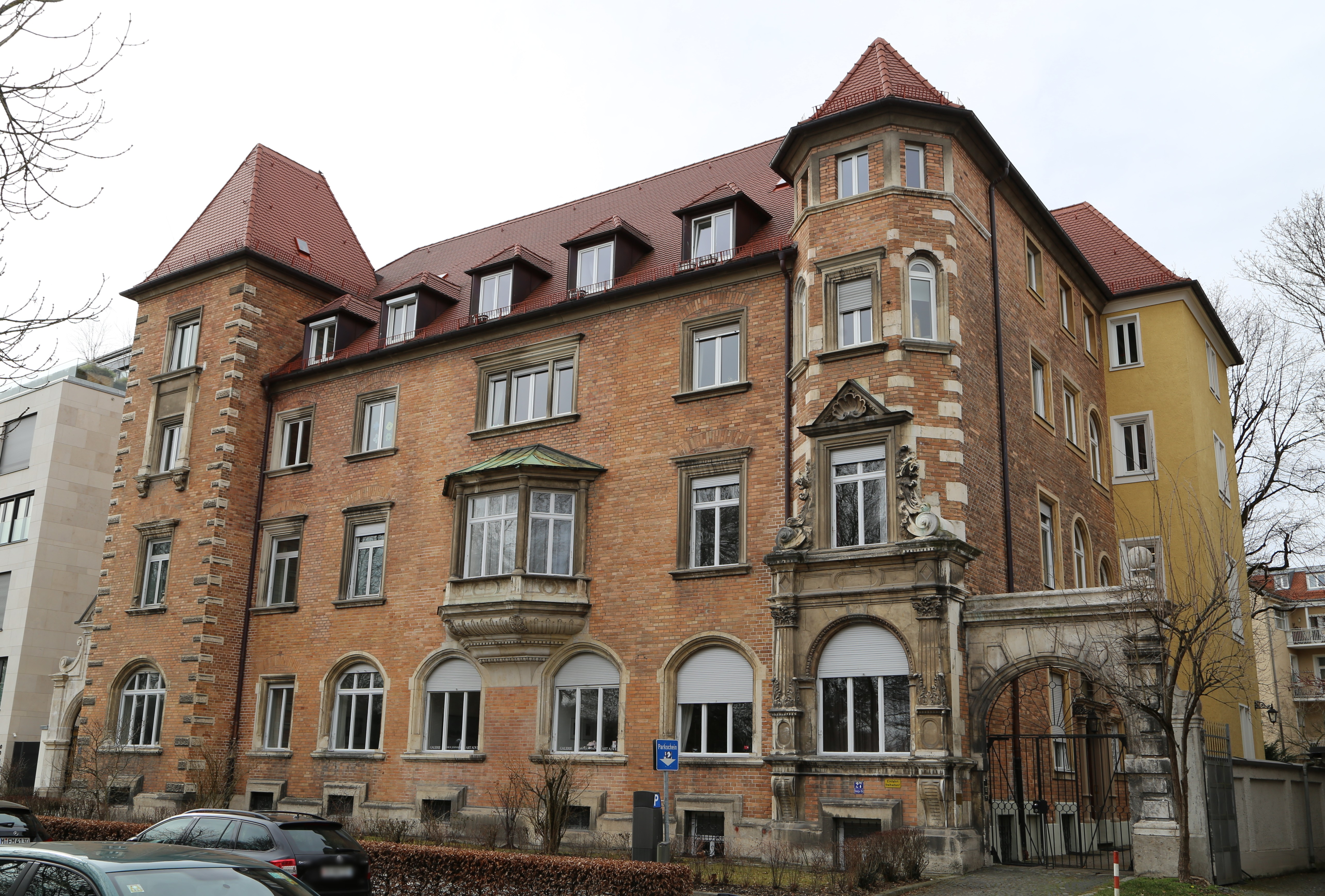
- Königinstraße 27

- Location within Germany
- Length: 1,450 m (4,760 ft)
- Location: Munich
- Postal code: 80539, 80802
- Nearest metro station: Königinstraße (Bus 100)
- Coordinates: 48.15035°N 11.58463°E
- Major junctions: Schönfeldstraße, Veterinärstraße, Schackstraße, Ohmstraße, Giselastraße, Gedonstraße, Thiemestraße

The Königinstraße is a street in Munich. It runs west of the Englischer Garten from the Von-der-Tann-Straße in the district of Maxvorstadt, to the north and to the Maria-Josepha-Straße and Mandlstraße in the Ensemble Alt-Schwabing.

== Description ==
At Königinstraße 5, is the American Consulate General. Due to the security precautions, entry into the Königinstraße from the Von-der-Tann-Straße is no longer possible for vehicles.

On the estate of today's house number 28, was the Zoologischer Garten Benedikt (private zoological garden) from 1862, then still known as Wiesenstraße. In the former Wiesenstraße 6 (now also Königinstraße) was the homeopathic hospital of Joseph Buchner, homeopathic family doctor at the court of King Maximilian II of Bavaria and honorary professor at LMU Munich, for the purpose of "free treatment of poor servants, family members and workers".

Further north, is the ancestral site of the veterinary faculty (still listed with the address Veterinärstraße 13). Already in Schwabing, with the house number 34, lies the Universitäts Reitschule München (university riding school Munich). The headquarters of BayBG Bayerische Beteiligungsgesellschaft is located in Königinstraße 23 in a richly structured historically listed Neo-Baroque building.

With the historically listed main building containing the Schmuckhof of the Munich Re on Königinstraße 107 and the, also historically listed, headquarters of Allianz SE at number 28, Königinstraße is the only German street in which two DAX companies have their headquarters. Other renowned financial service providers in the street are the LfA Förderbank Bayern and the Bayerische Beteiligungsgesellschaft (BayBG)

The Nanosystems Initiative Munich is also located in the Königinstraße, the building emerged from an implementation competition with an urban planning and landscape planning component. The new building was controversial, since the Veterinary Clinic from around 1900 of LMU Munich, including a 1902-built Art Nouveau building with Jurassic marble staircases with wrought iron Art Nouveau railings, had to be demolished. The building was classified as "worthy of a memorial" in the assessment of the state building authority of Munich but was not set by the Bavarian State Office for Monument Protection on the list of buildings worth protecting.

Altogether, 21 buildings are listed on the list of historical monuments in Maxvorstadt and Schwabing on the 1.45 km long road. At the corner of Königinstraße - Mary Josepha Straße – Mandlstraße, begins the protected building ensemble Altschwabing. At Königinstraße 85, is an Art Nouveau building built in 1906 by Martin Dülfer, which is protected together with the buildings at Ohmstraße 13, 15 and 17 as "Ensemble Ohmstraße".

In 2016, the Königinstraße became a pilot experiment for a new joint project between BMW and the city of Munich, where street lamps were used as charging stations for electric cars.

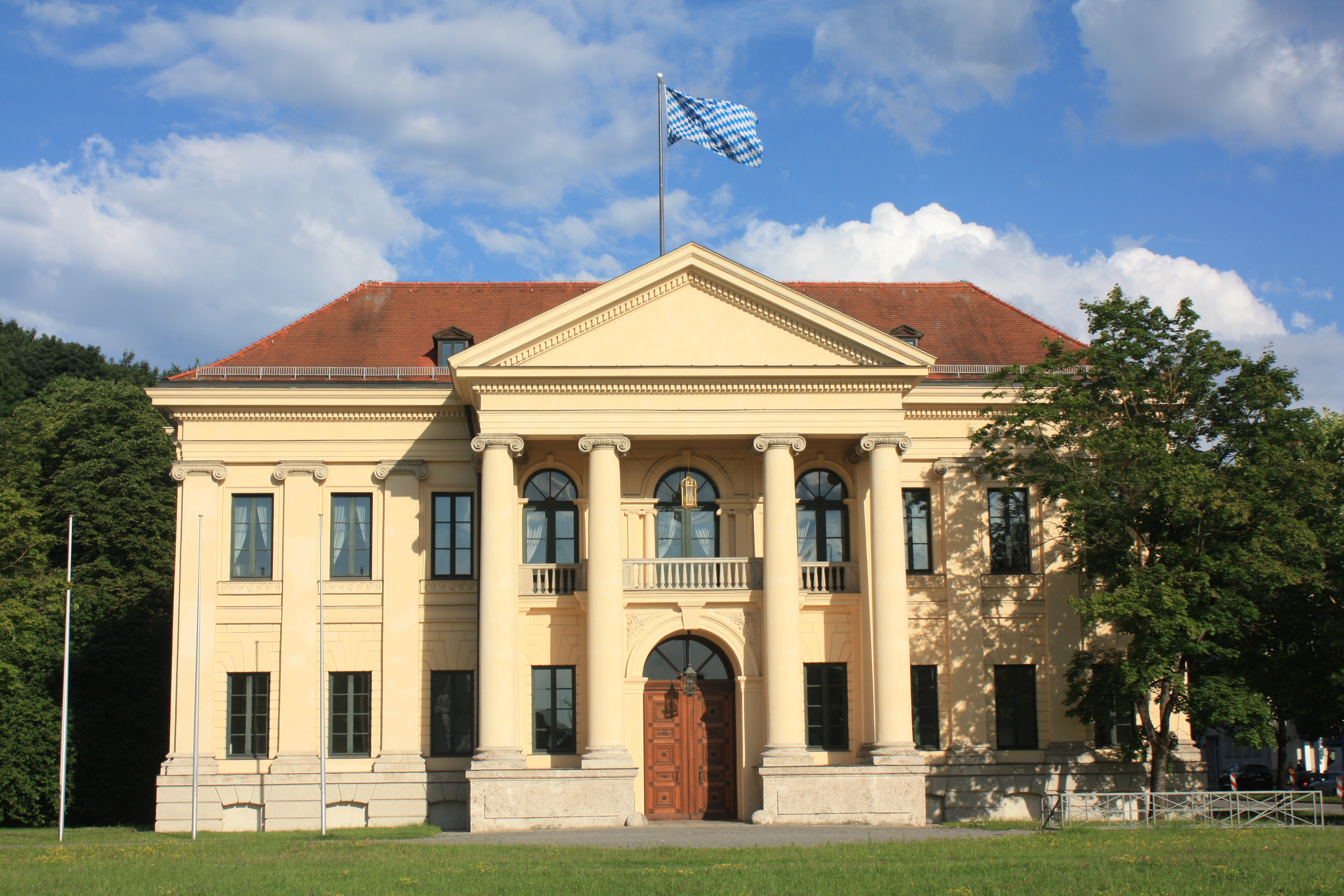
Prinz-Carl-Palais

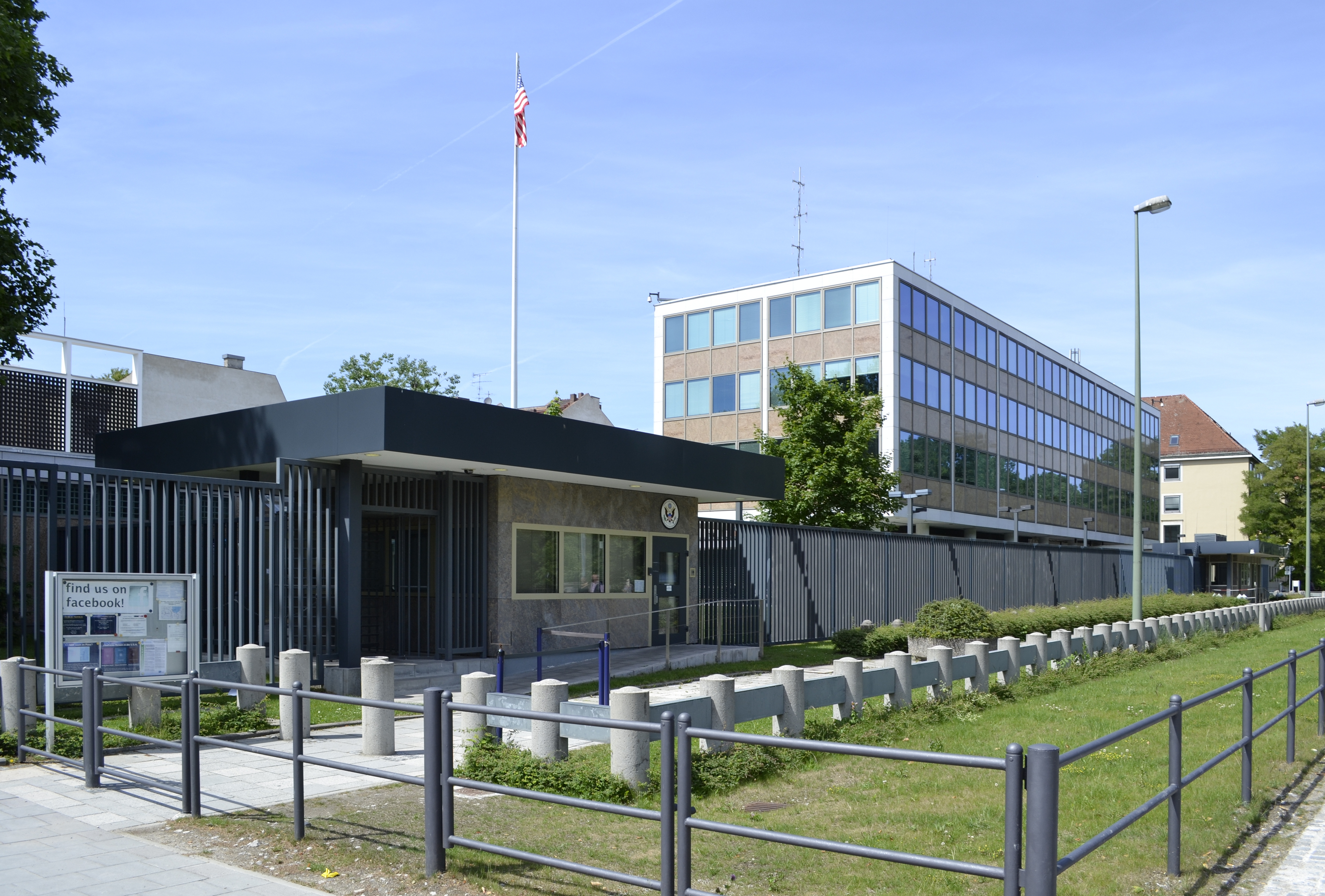
Consulate General of the United States, Munich

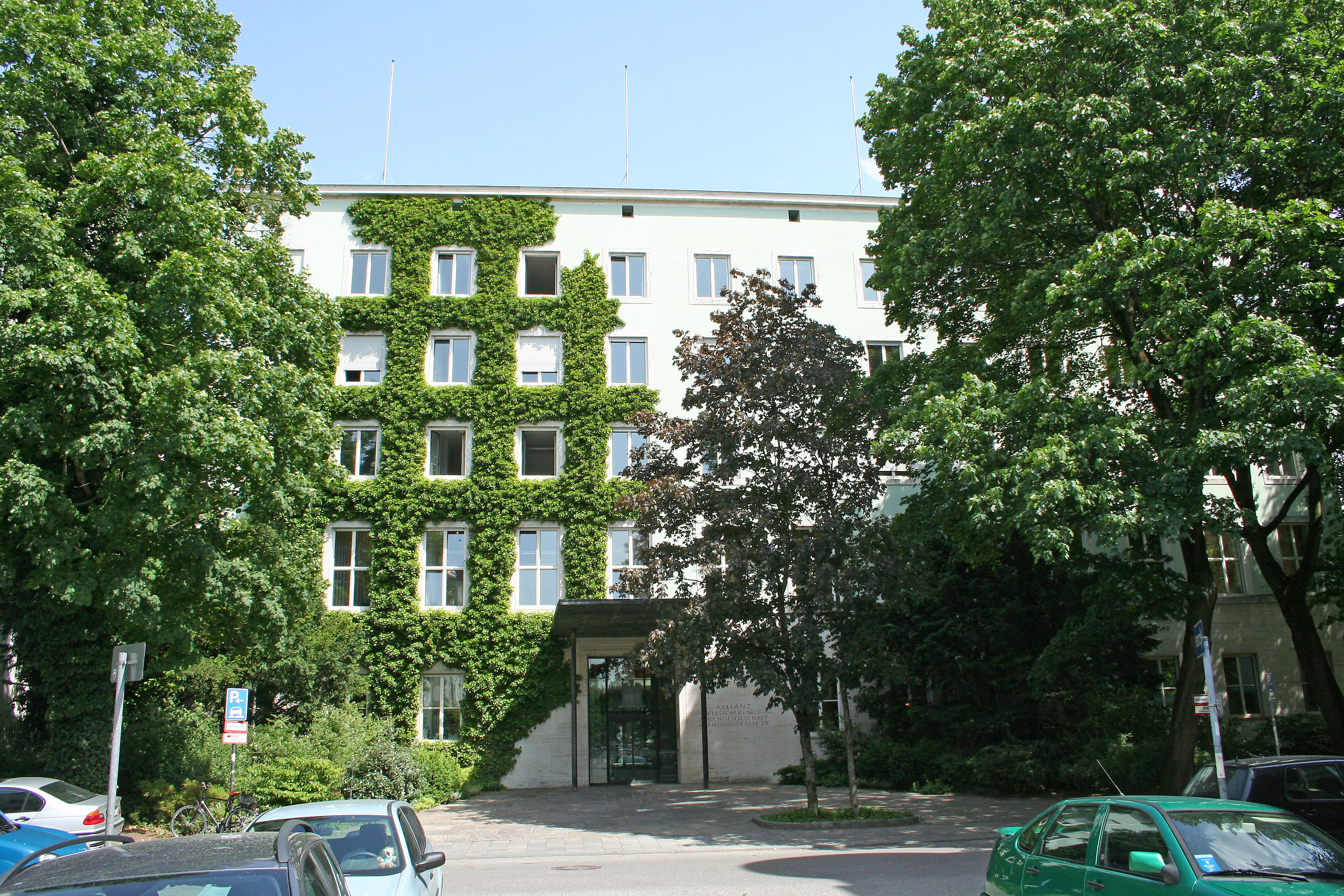
Directorate General of Allianz SE in Königinstraße 28

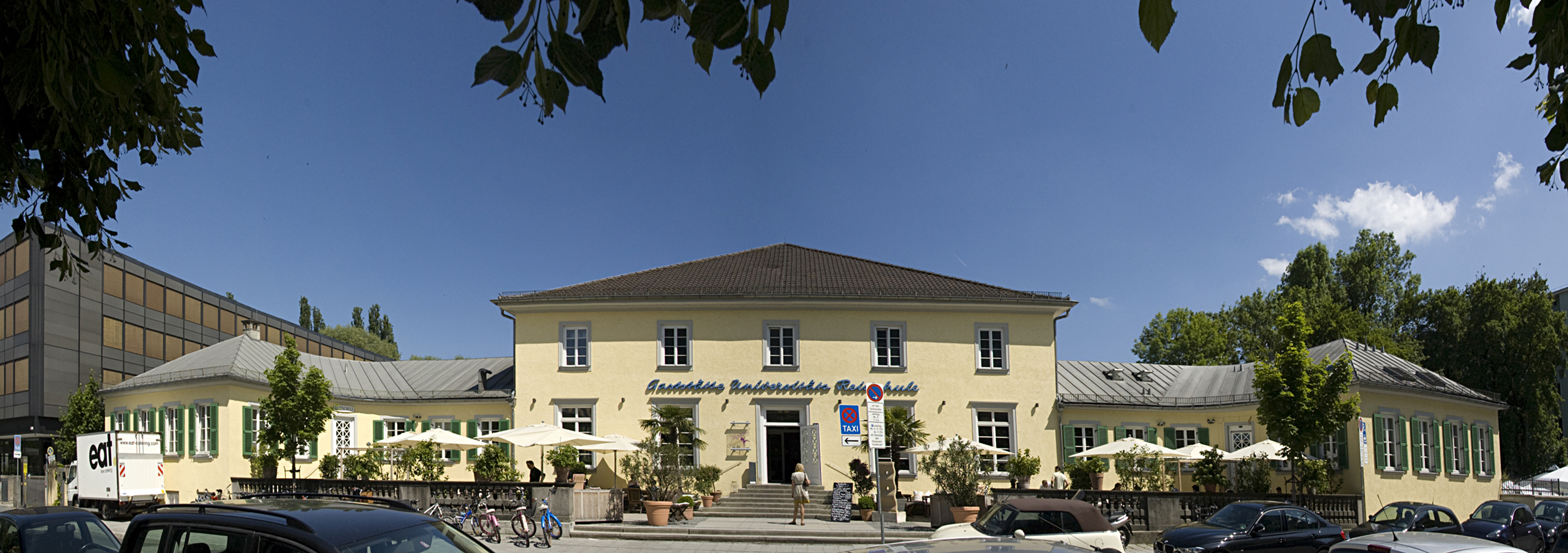
Universitäts Reitschule München

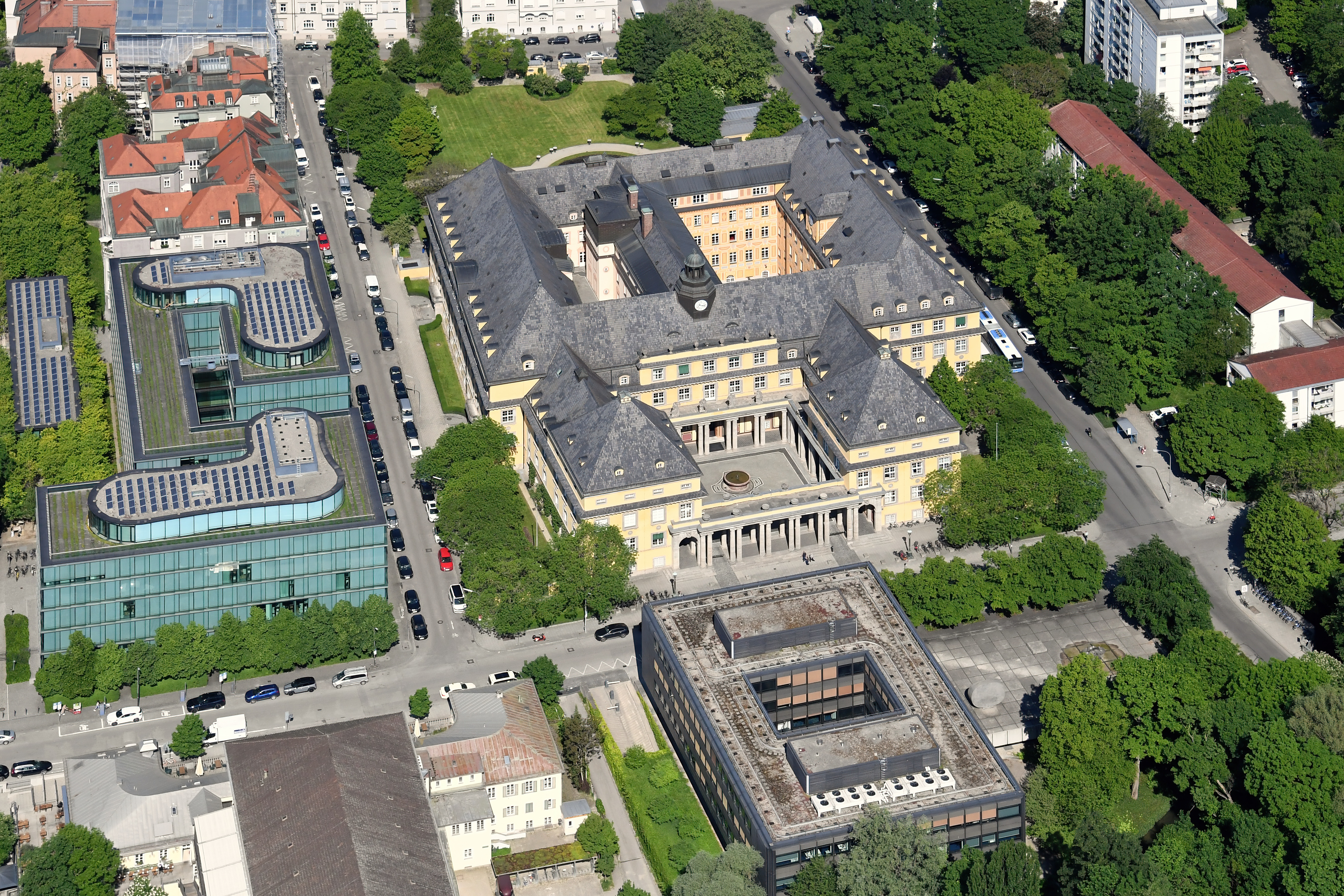
Headquarters of Munich Re

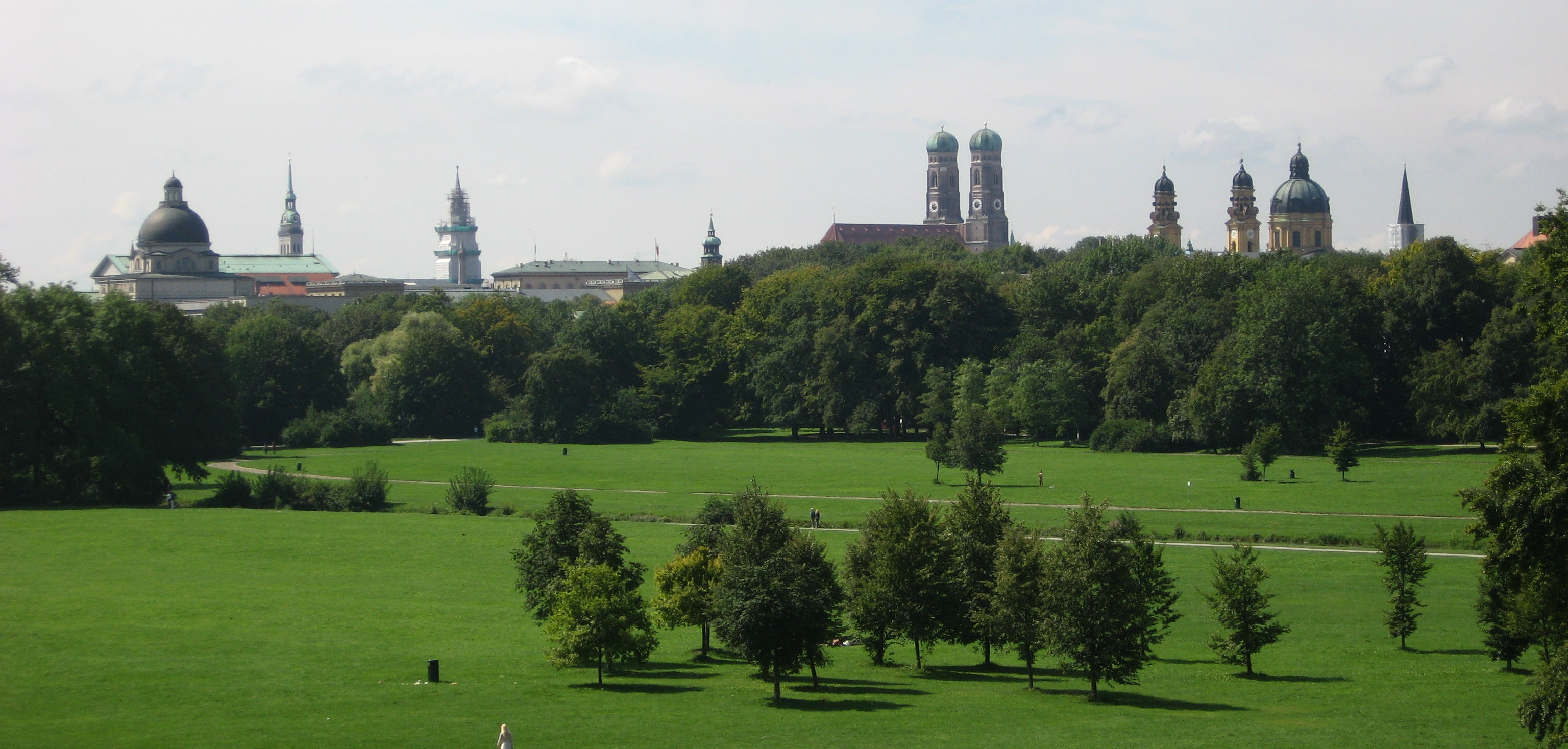
Englischer Garten with view towards Königinstraße

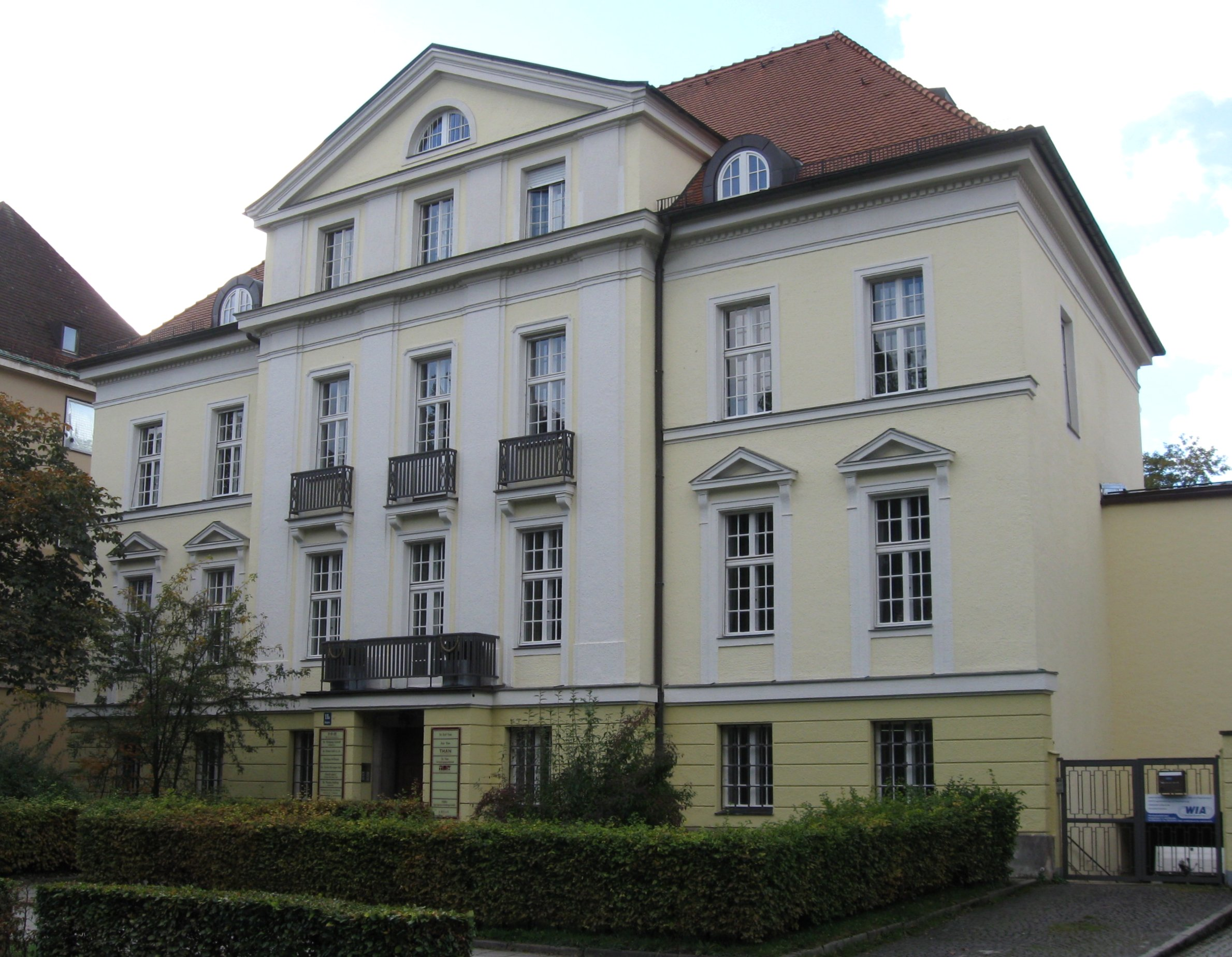
Palais from 1913/14 at Königinstraße 11a

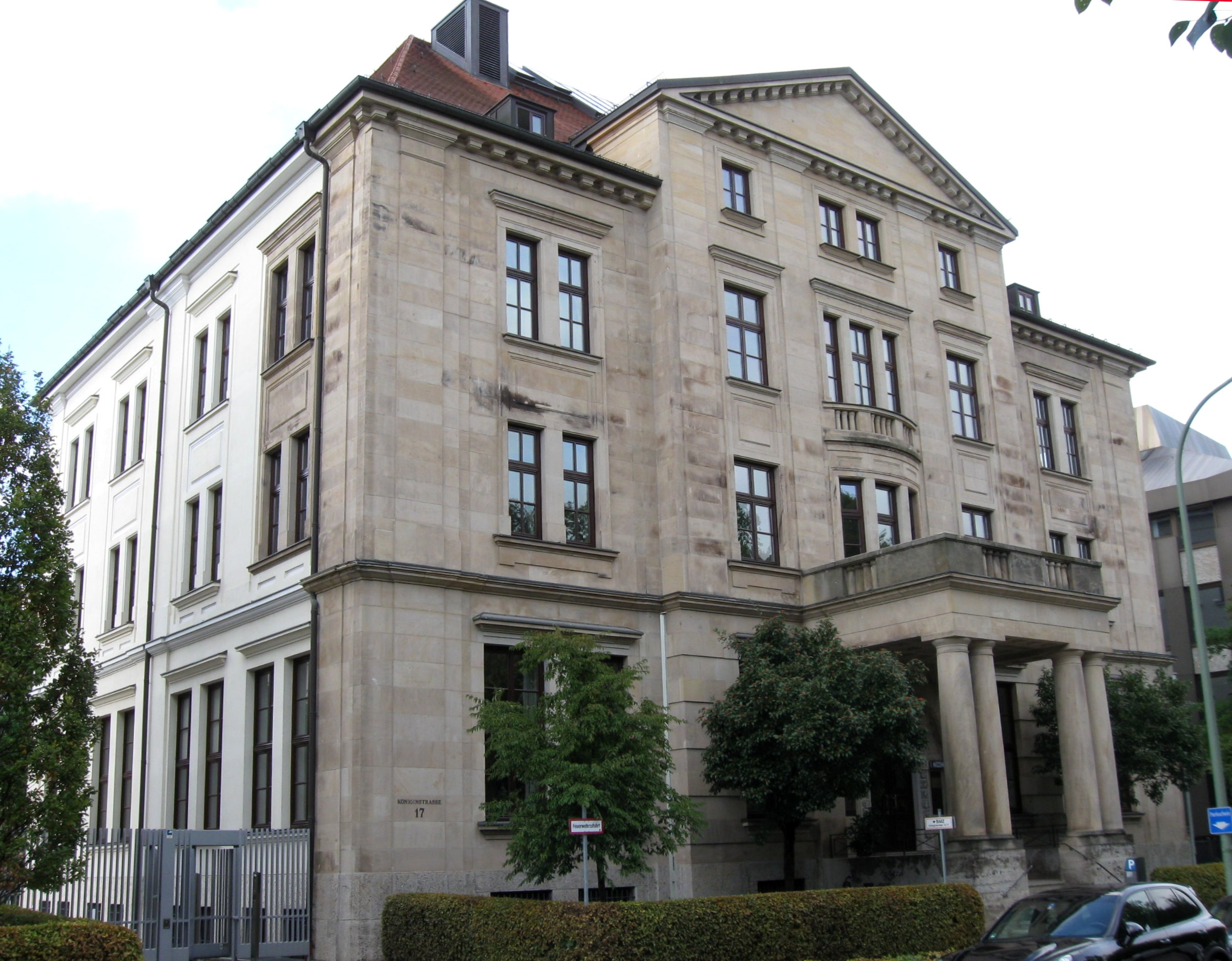
LfA Förderbank Bayern in Königinstr. 17

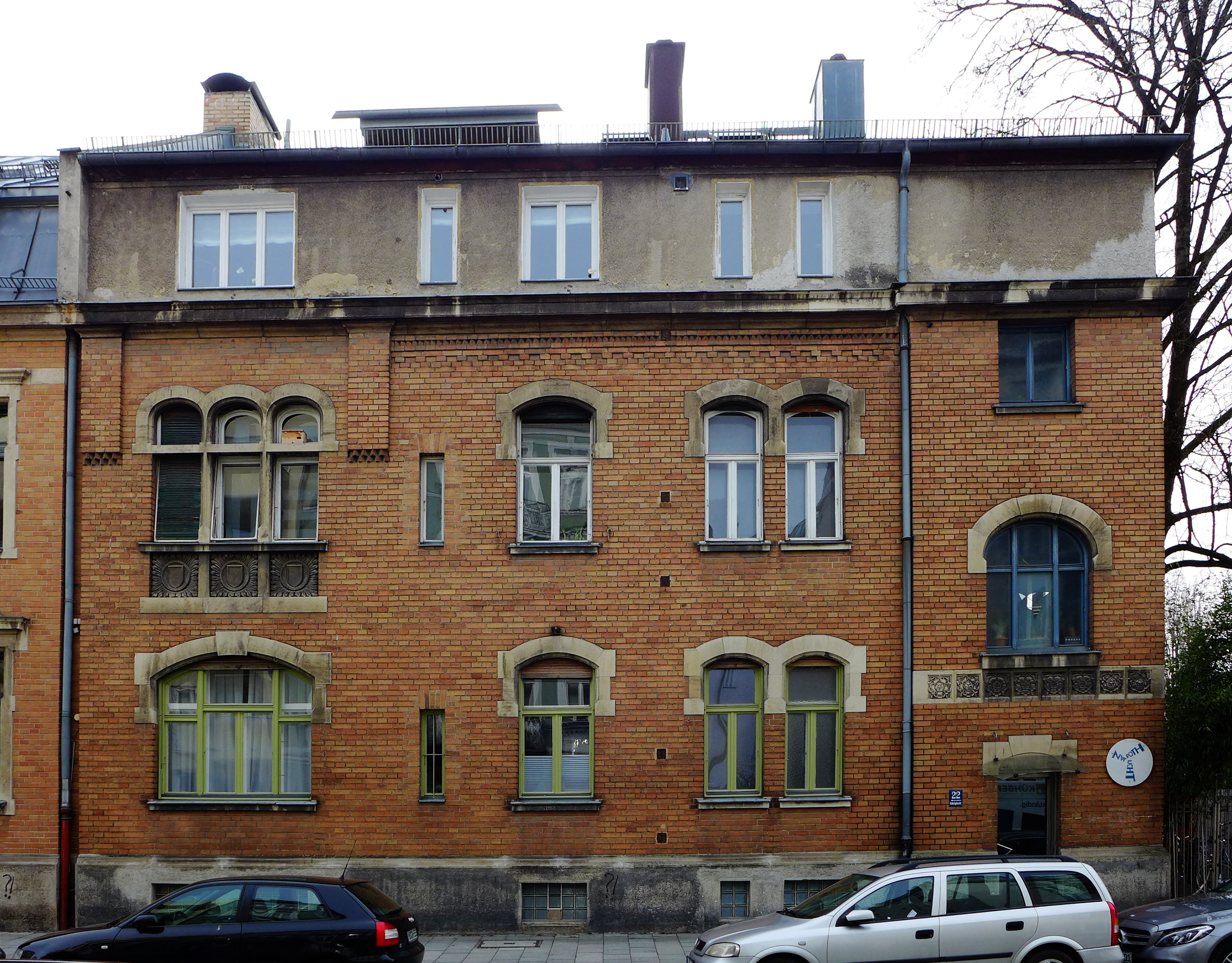
Neo-Renaissance villa from the end of the 19th century in the Königinstr. 22

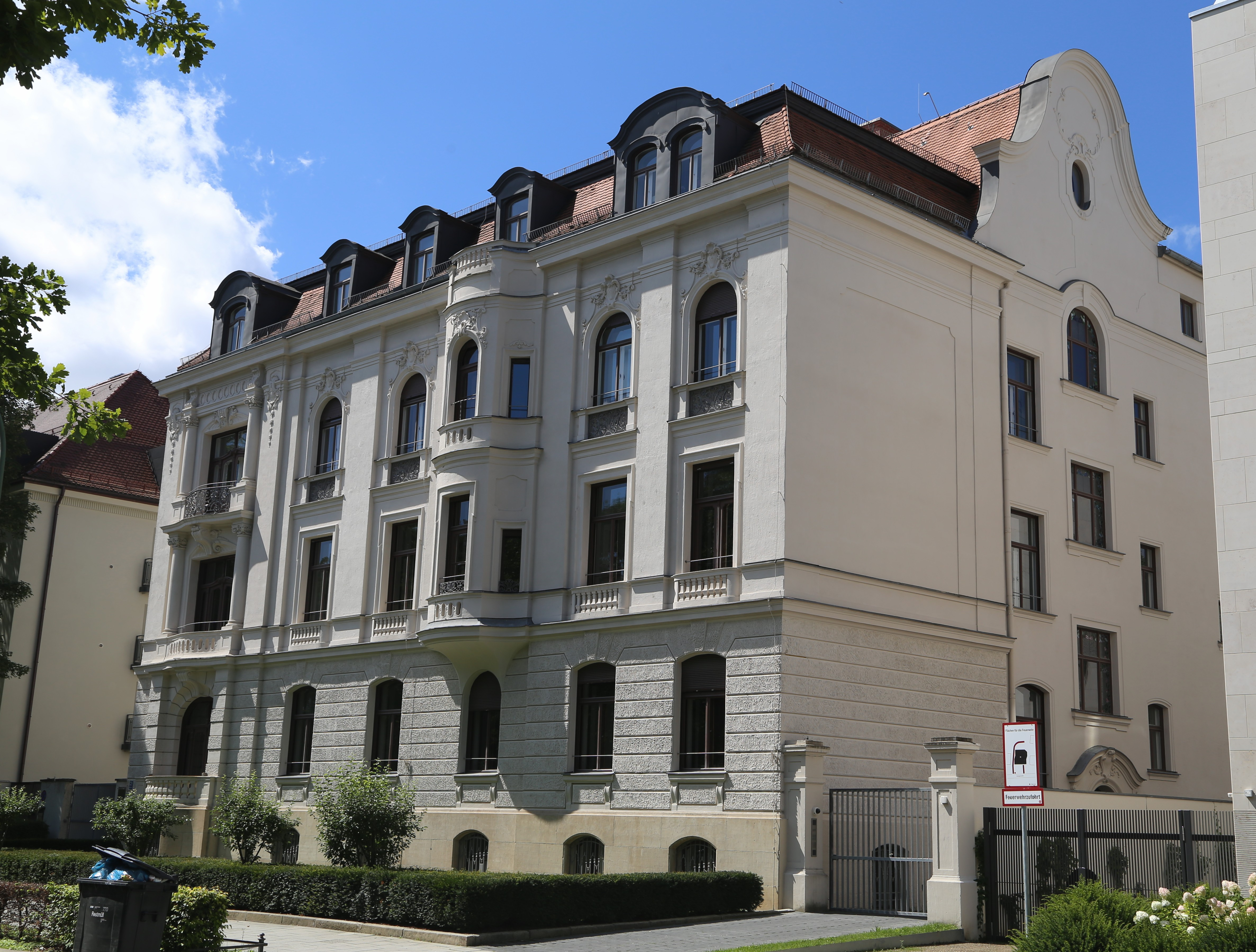
Headquarters of BayBG Bayerische Beteiligungsgesellschaft in Königinstr. 23

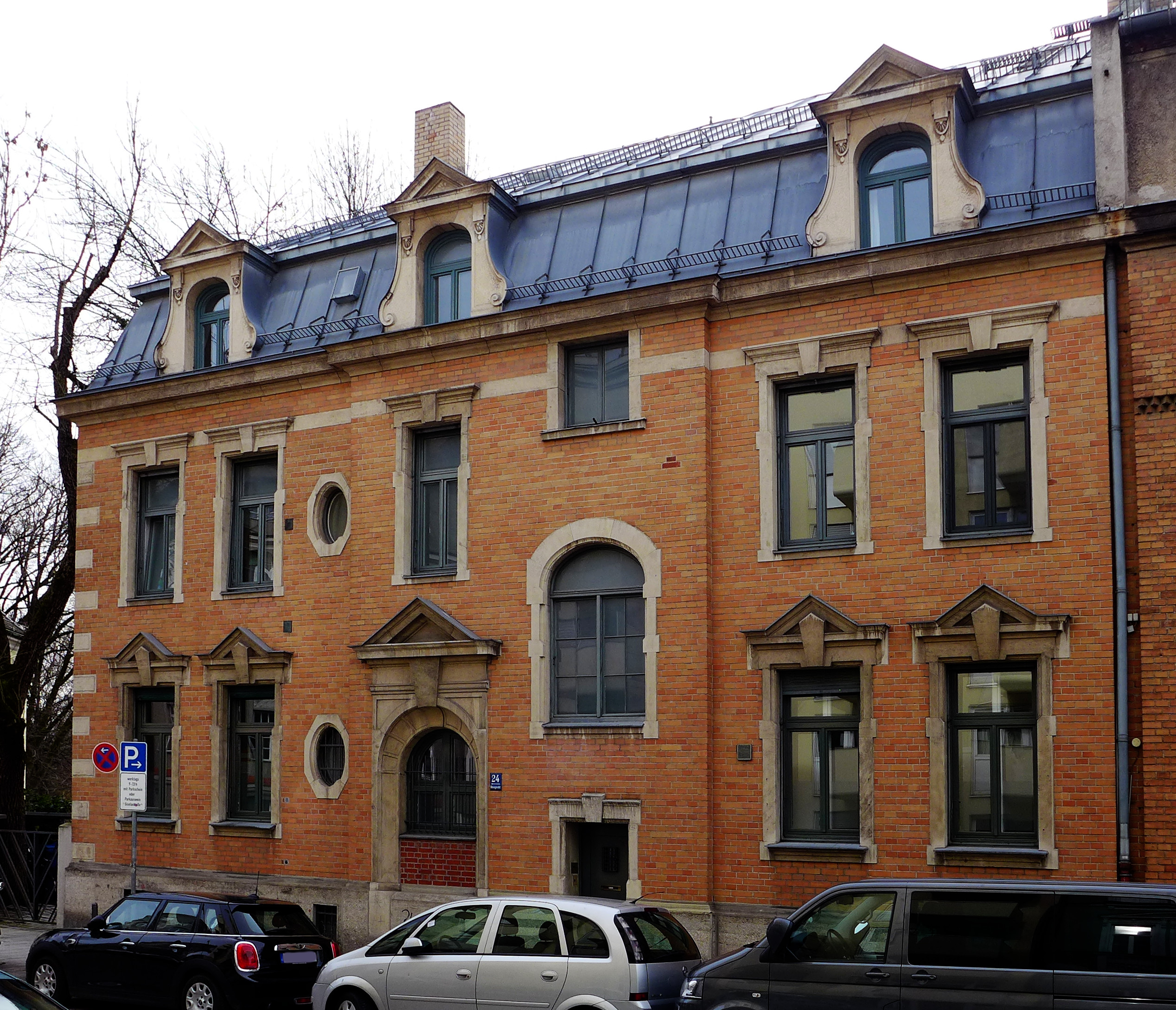
Neo-Renaissance villa in the Königinstr. 24

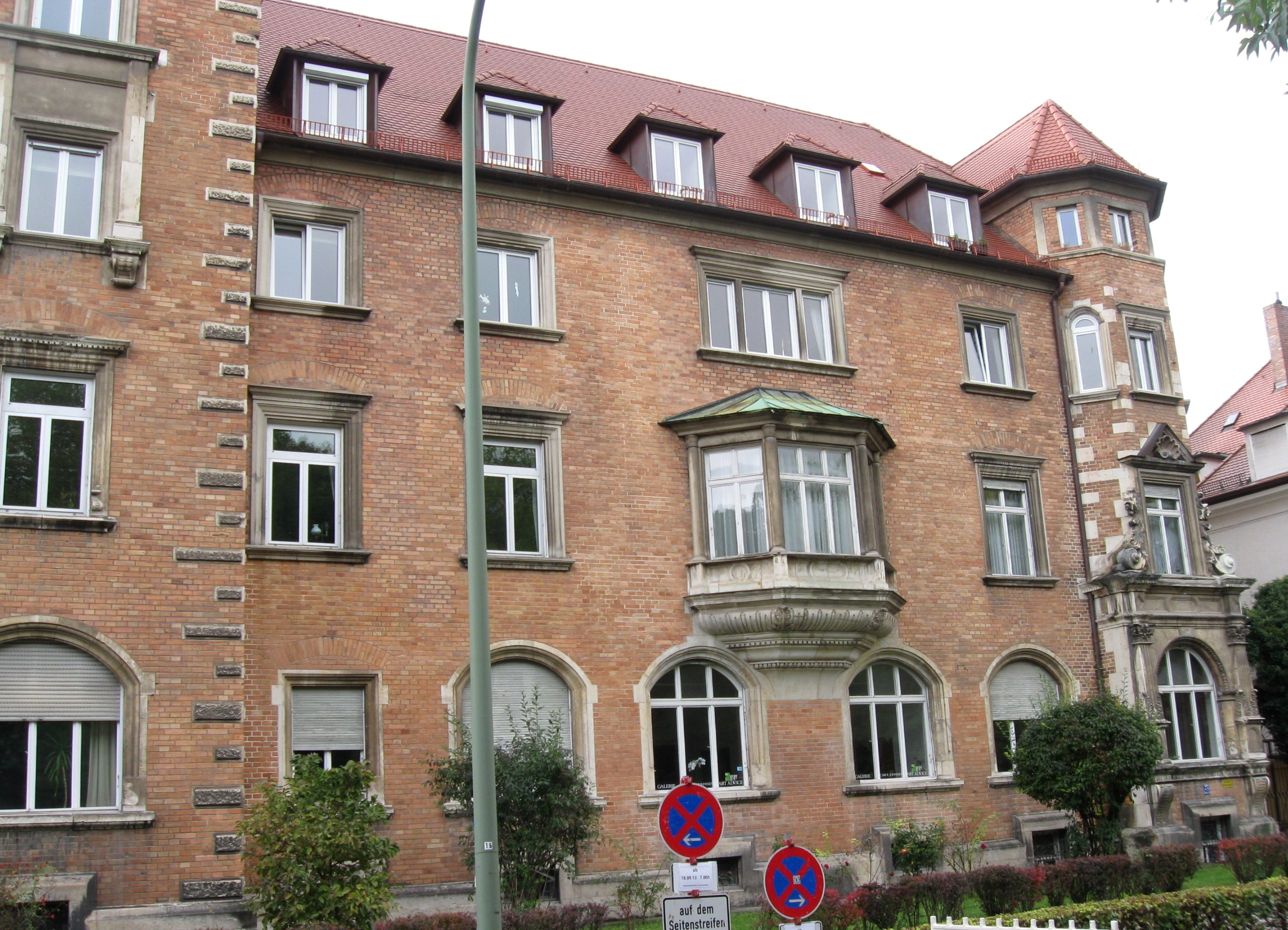
1893 built house of the painter Franz Defregger in the Königinstr. 27

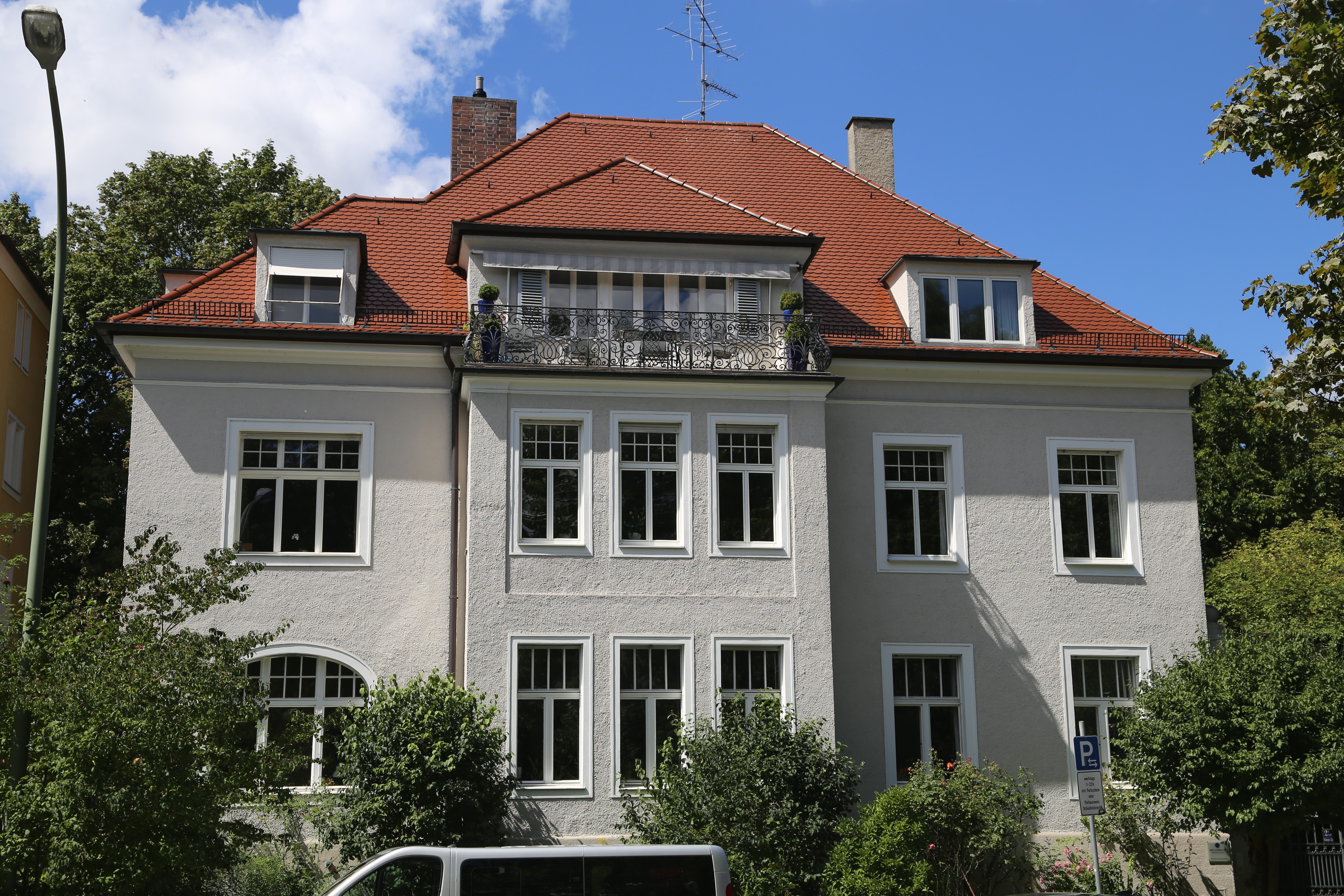
Villa in the Königinstr. 29

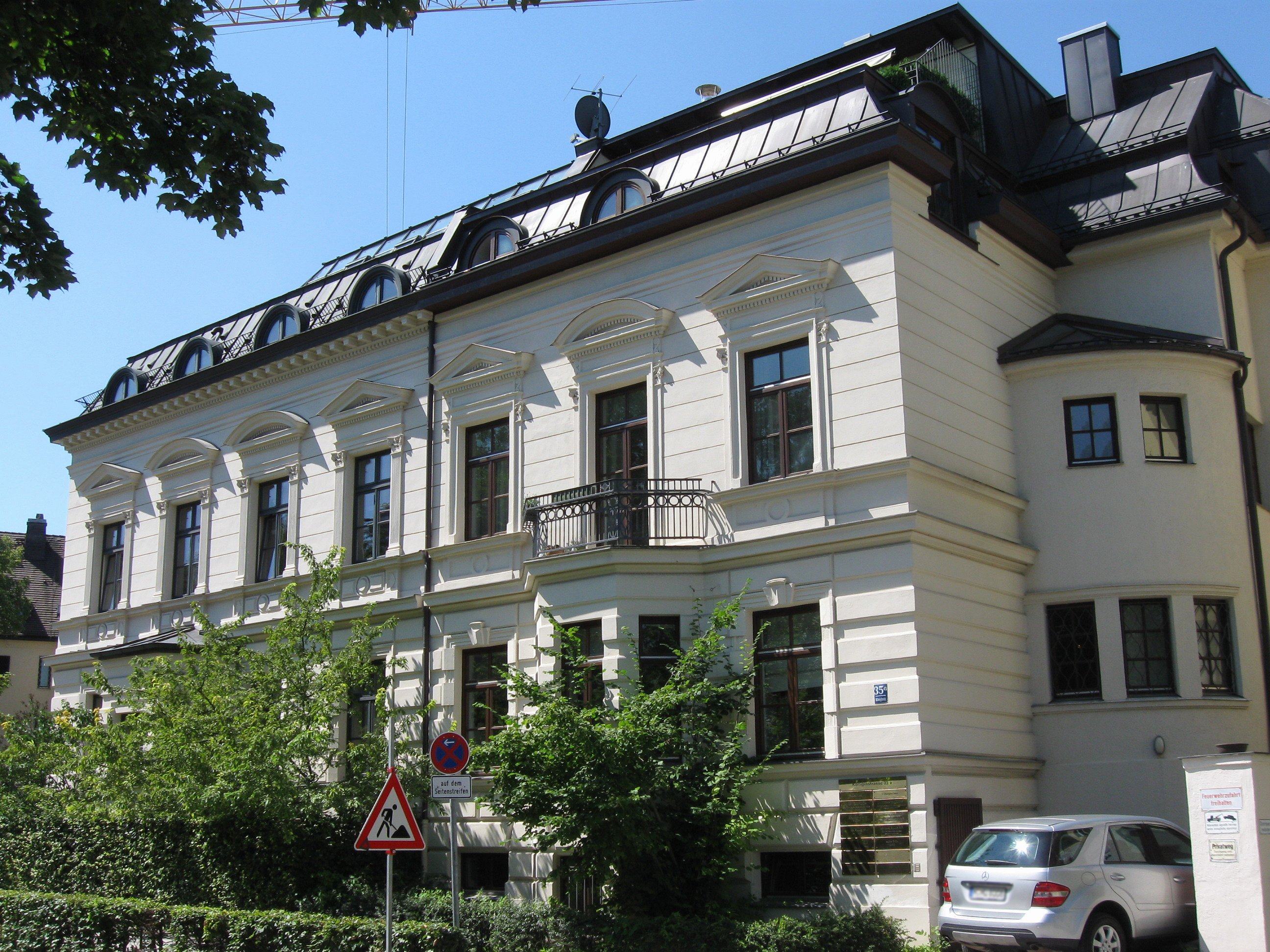
Neo-Renaissance residential building in the Königinstr. 35

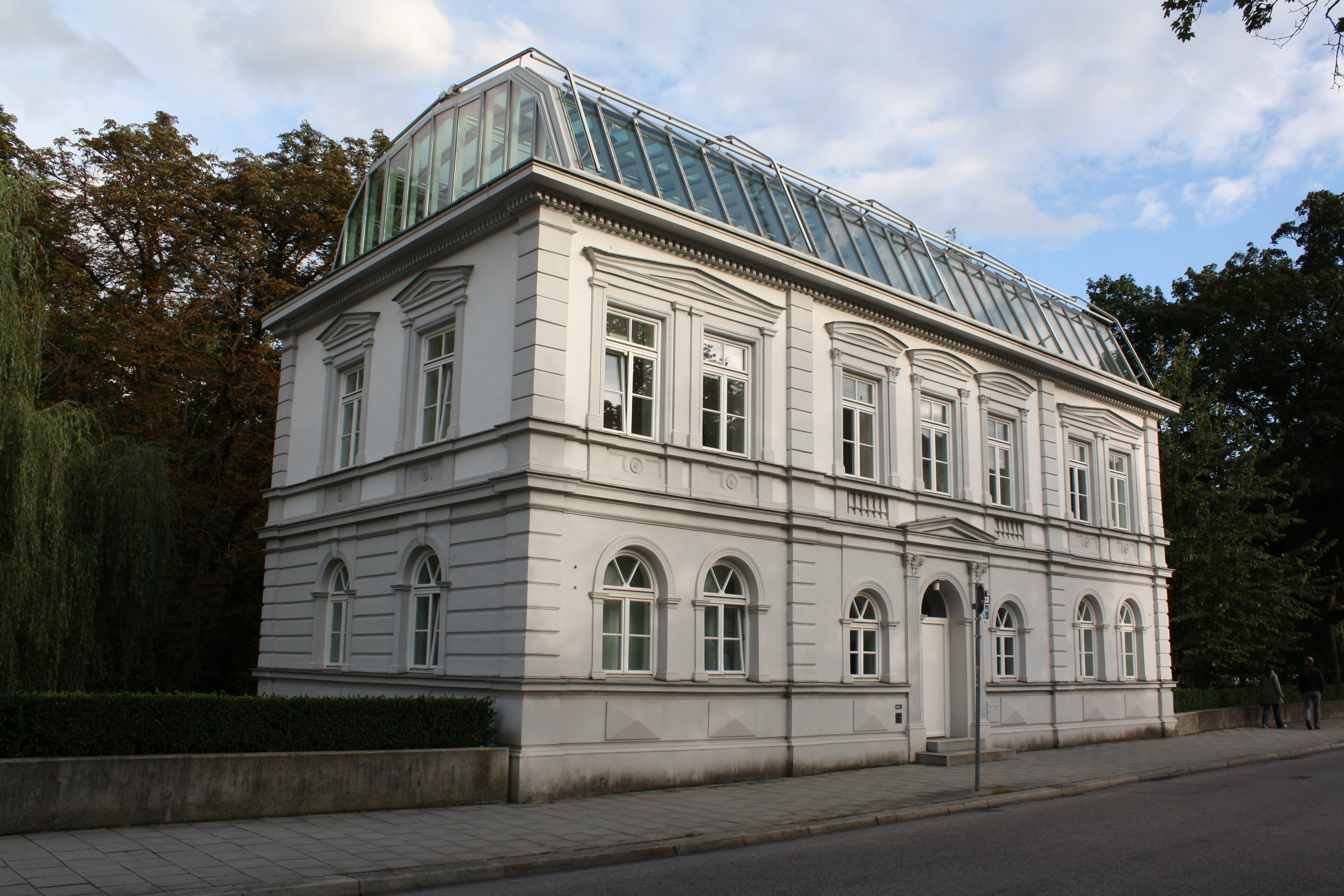
Alois Alzheimer's House (Munich Re guest house)

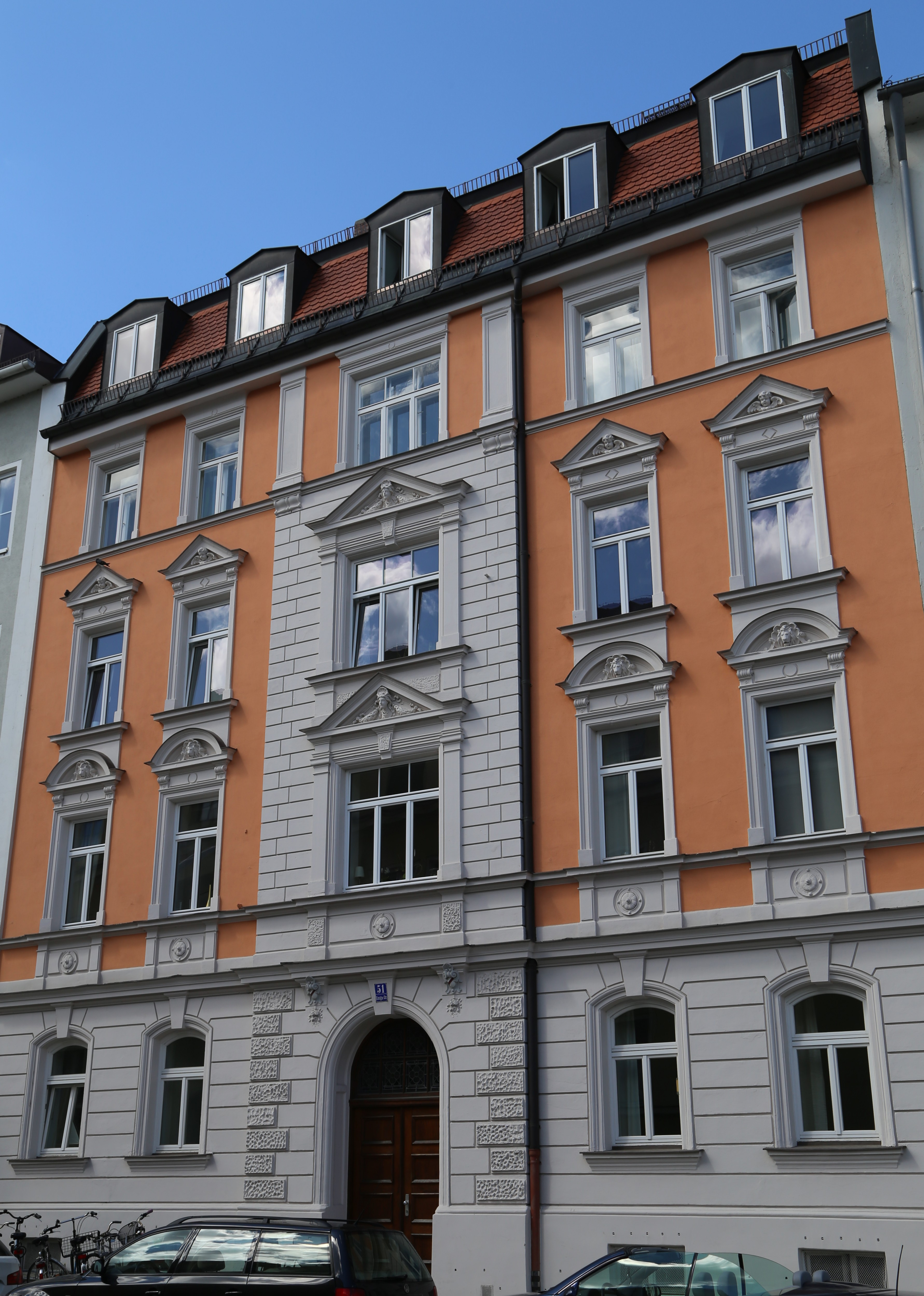
Neo-Renaissance residential building in the Königinstr. 51

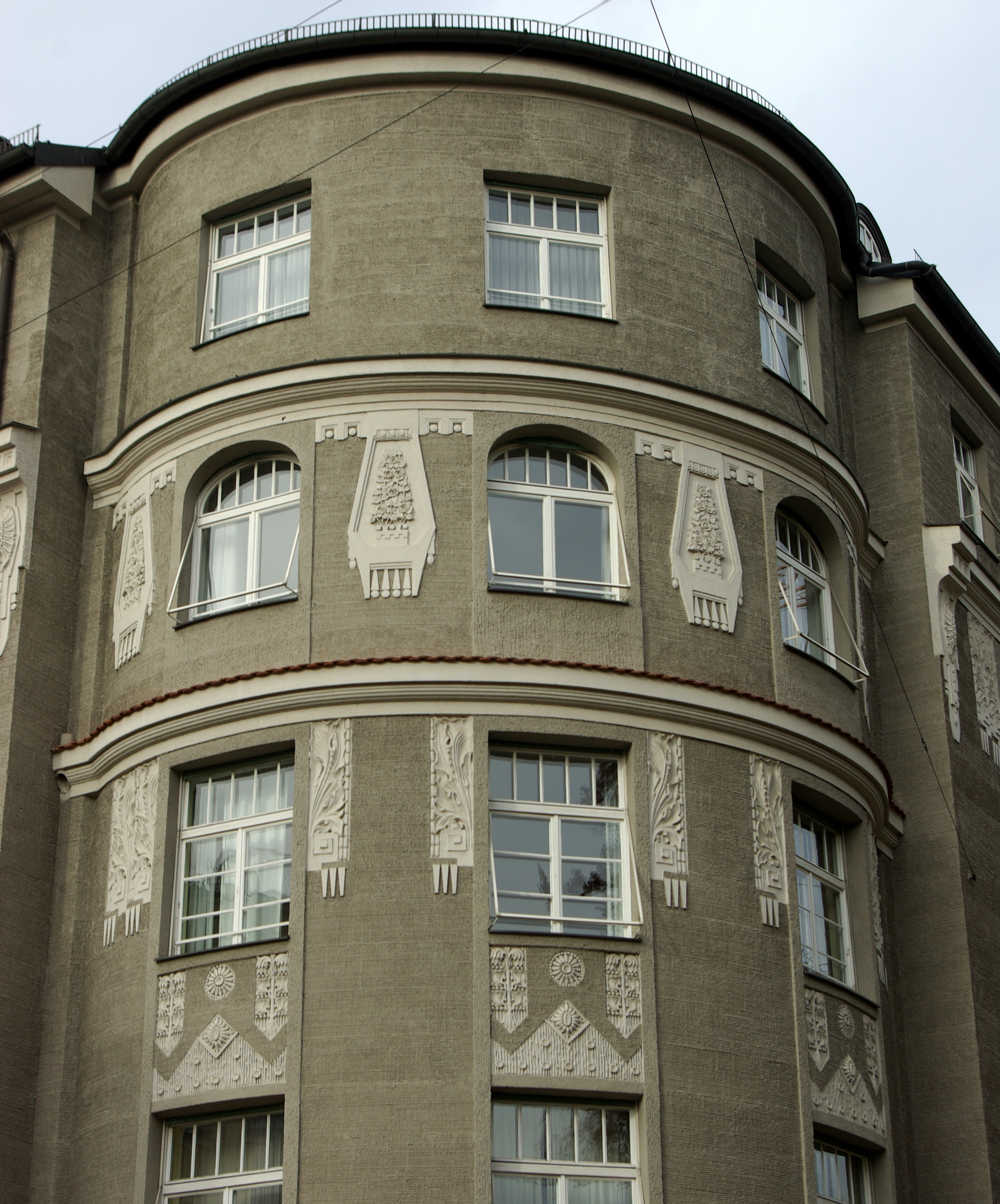
Königinstraße 85 (belonging to Ensemble Ohmstraße)
