= Finck =

Finck refers to:

- Finck family, German banking dynasty

Finck is a surname or part of a longer surname of German origin and the name of several individuals:

- Count Albrecht Konrad Finck von Finckenstein (1660–1735), Prussian field marshal
- Count Karl-Wilhelm Finck von Finckenstein (1714–1800), Prussian Prime Minister
- Countess Eva Finck von Finckenstein (1903–1994), German politician
- Albert Finck, German politician
- August Georg Heinrich von Finck (1898–1980), German banker
- August von Finck Jr. (1930–2021), German banker and entrepreneur
- August François von Finck (born 1968), German businessman
- David Finck (born 1958), American jazz bassist
- Ethel Finck (1932–2003), American interventional radiologist and inventor
- Franz Nikolaus Finck (1867–1910), German linguist
- Friedrich August von Finck (1718–1766), Prussian soldier
- Heinrich Finck (1445–1527), German composer of the Renaissance
- Hermann Finck (1527–1558), German composer, music theorist and organist of the Renaissance, great-nephew of Heinrich Finck
- Hermine Finck (1872–1932), German operatic soprano
- Jonathan Friedrich von Finck, Prussian general
- Nick Finck (born 1975), Publisher, author, speaker, and user experience designer
- Pierre Joseph Étienne Finck (1797–1870), French mathematician
- Robin Finck (born 1971), American rock guitarist (worked with Guns N' Roses and Nine Inch Nails)
- Werner Finck (1902–1978), German comedian
- Wilhelm von Finck (1848–1924), German banker
- William E. Finck (1822–1901), U.S. Congressman from Ohio

== Other uses ==
- FiNCK, a video game by Nicklas Nygren

== See also ==
- Fink (disambiguation)
- Finke (disambiguation)
- Funk (disambiguation)
