= Finck family =

German entrepreneurial family

Finck von Finck
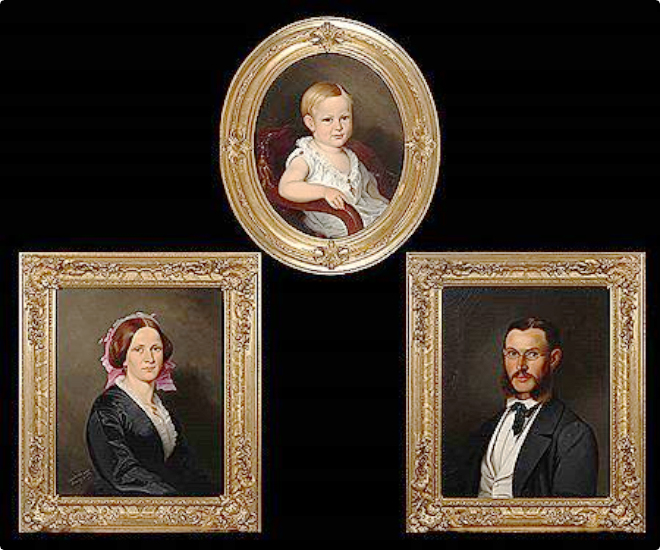
- Three portraits of the Finck family, c. 1859
- Current region: Germany, Switzerland, Canada
- Origin: Götzenhain, Grand Duchy of Hesse (now Germany)
- Founded: Founding of Finck & Schäfer 1790, Bad Vilbel; 236 years ago
- Founder: Wilhelm von Finck

The Finck family is a German family and banking dynasty which became prominent in Germany and Europe during the 19th and 20th century. Members of the family were involved with various companies, as early as 1790, when Burckhard Finck founded Finck & Schäfer in Bad Vilbel, a wholesale and retailer for liquor, oil, soap and colonial goods.

The family became most notable through Wilhelm von Finck who was prominently associated with Merck, Finck & Co since 1870. He was also a co-founder of Allianz and Munich Re and was nobilitated in 1905 by Luitpold, Prince Regent of Bavaria. Since then his family branch carries the nobiliary particle and is known as von Finck.

== Members ==
- Burckhard Finck (1768–1848)
  - Heinrich Finck, pastor in Trebur
  - Wilhelm Finck (1810–1883), married to Margarete (née Müller)
    - Wilhelm Peter Finck (1848–1924), since 1905 von Finck, bankier and businessman who co-founded Merck, Finck & Co, Allianz and Munich Re; married Marie (née Fäustle; 1865–1935); four children;
      - Margarete Finck (born 1891), married to a Mr. Stengel
      - Wilhelm Finck (1893–1916), died during World War I, no children
      - Elisabeth Finck (born 1896), married to a Mr. Winterstein
      - August von Finck Sr. (1898–1980), married firstly to Margot von Rücker (married 1927, divorced 1942); three children; secondly to Dr. Gerda Mau in 1953; two children;
        - Wilhelm von Finck (1927–2003)
        - August von Finck Jr. (1931–2014), married to Francine (née Le Tanneux von Saint Paul)
          - August Francois von Finck (born 1968)
          - Maximilian Rudolf Finck (born 1969)
          - Luitpold Ferdinand Finck (born 1971)
          - Maria Theresia von Finck (born 1975)
        - Eleonore von Rücker (1931–2014)
        - Gerhard von Finck (born 1954), a real estate broker in Toronto, Canada
          - Julian von Finck (born 1998), who ran for Legislative Assembly of Ontario, representing Toronto Centre, but was not elected
          - Nicoline Franziska von Finck (born 1997), a professional model and artist, based in Brooklyn, New York.
        - Helmut von Finck (born 1959)
          - Nino von Finck (born 1985)
      - August Finck (born 1850)
      - Marie Finck (born 1853)
