= August von Finck =

August von Finck may refer to:

- August von Finck, Sr., (1898–1980), German businessman
- August von Finck, Jr., (b. 1930), German businessman, son of the above
- August François von Finck, (born 1968), German businessman, son of the above
