= List of banking families =

Banking families are families that have been involved in banking for multiple generations, generally in the modern era as owners or co-owners of banks, which are often named after their families. Banking families have been important in the history of banking, especially before the 20th century. Banking families have existed and continue to exist in numerous countries.

== Antiquity ==
- House of Egibi of Mesopotamia
- Murashu family of Mesopotamia

== Modern ==
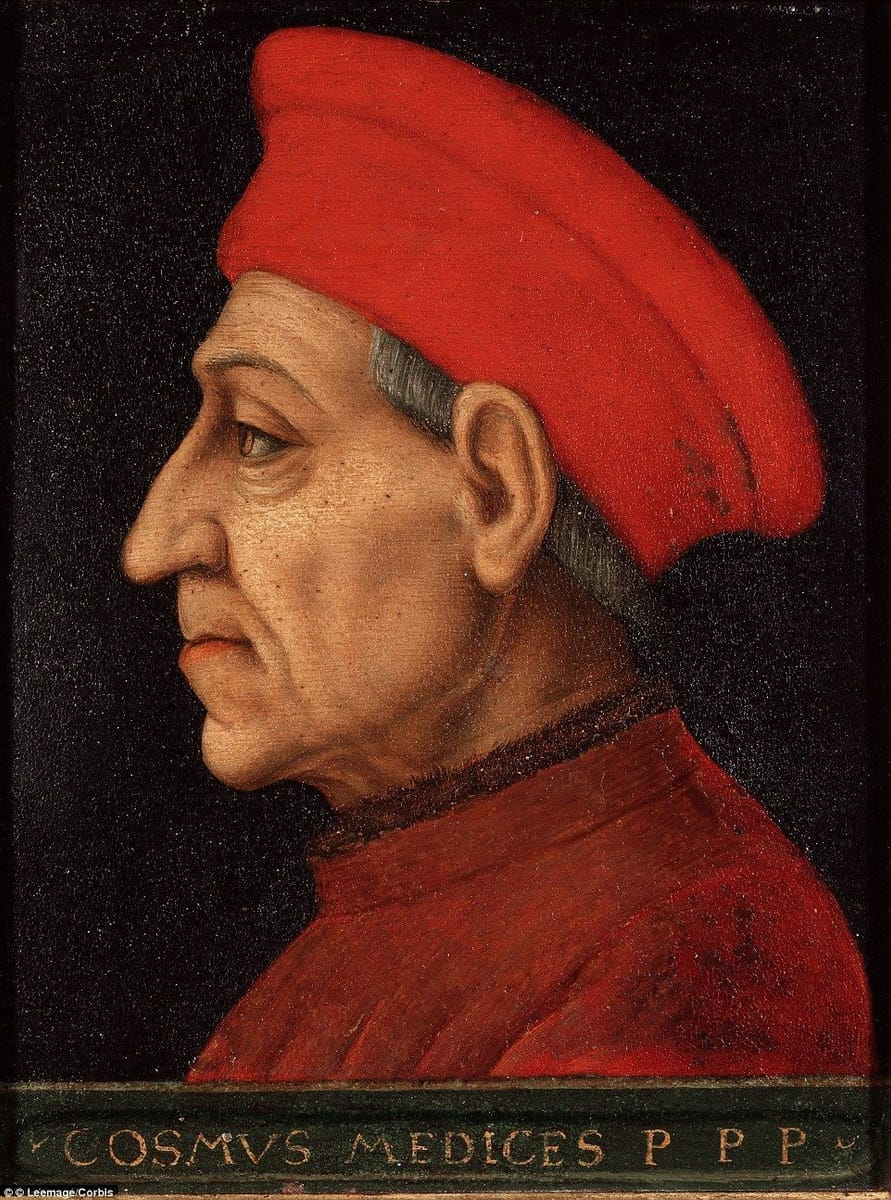
Cosimo de' Medici, Florentine banker, who established his family, the Medici dynasty, as effective rulers of Florence

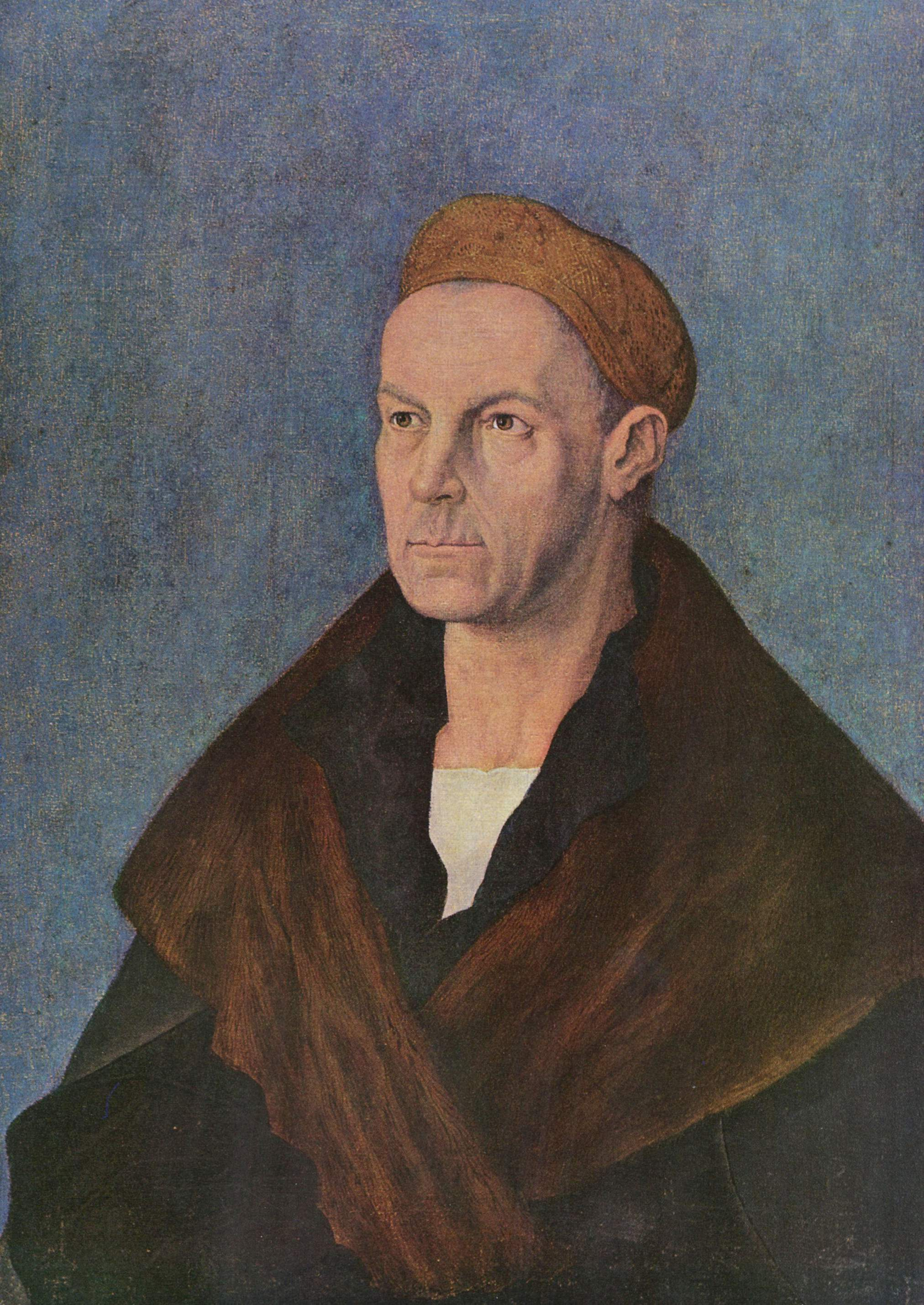
Jakob Fugger, of the Fugger family

Bindo Altoviti, famous patron of the arts, papal banker and grandnephew of Pope Innocent VIII

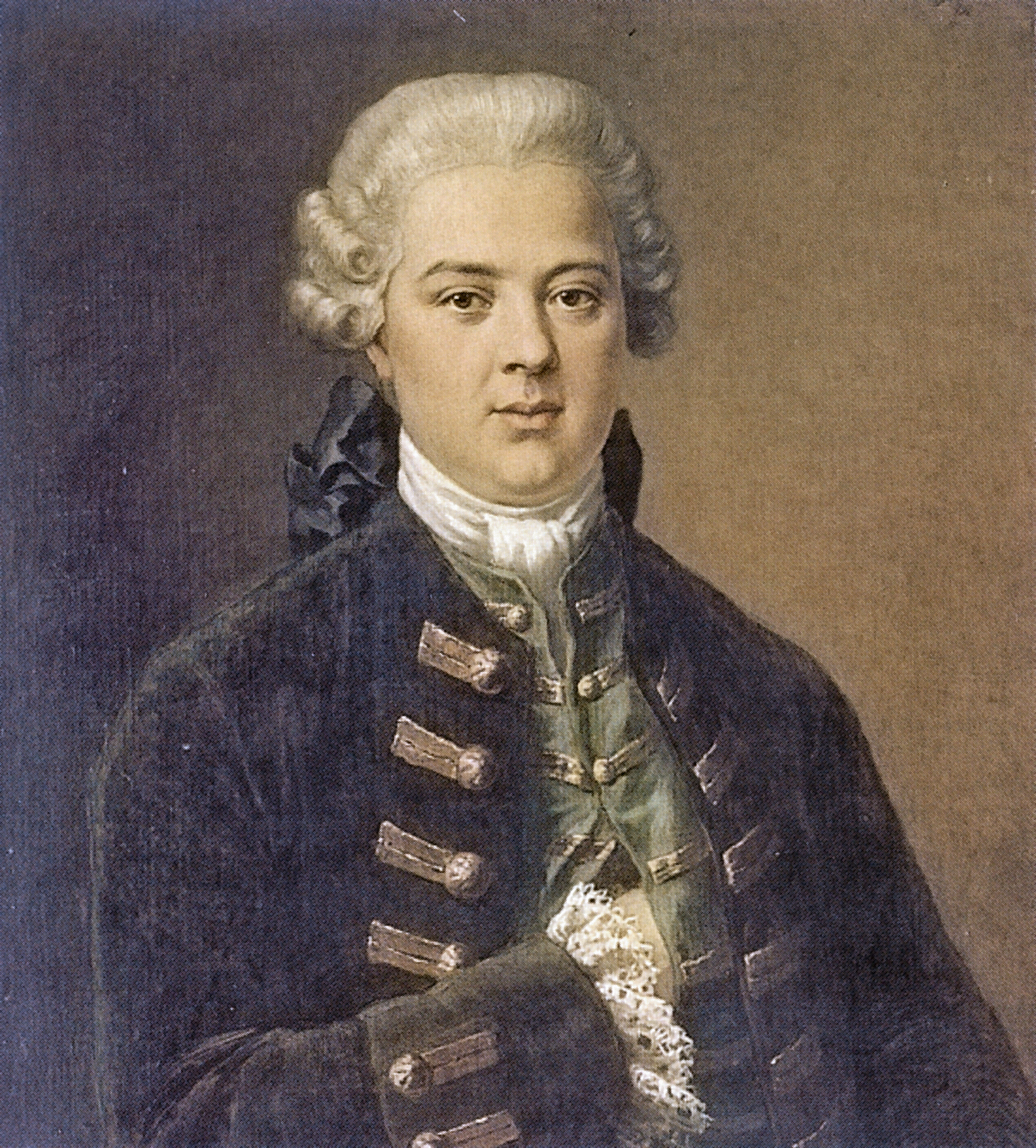
Johann Hinrich Gossler (1738–90), of the Berenberg-Gossler family

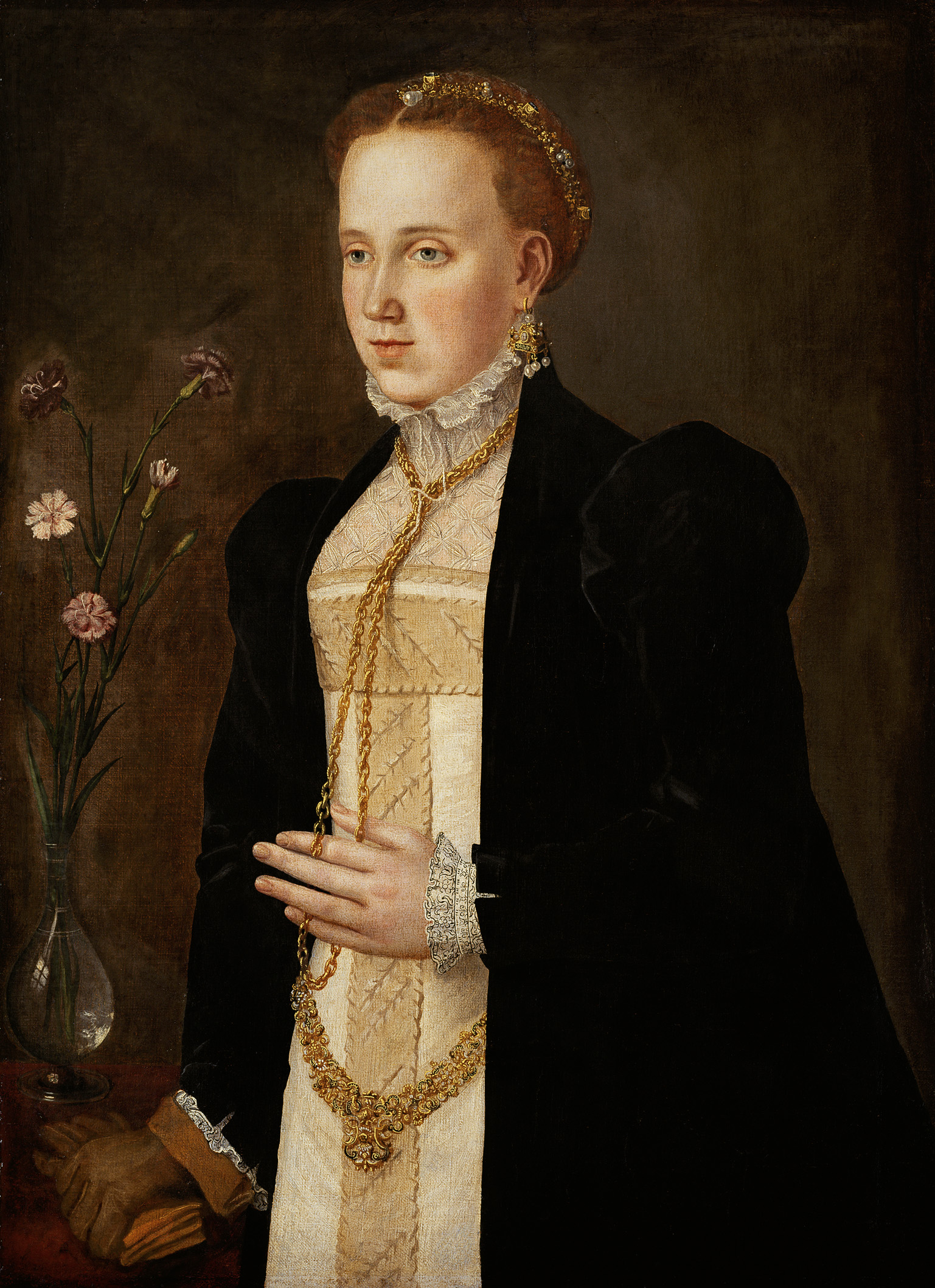
Philippine Welser, a member of the patrician Welser banking family, and the wife of Ferdinand II, Archduke of Austria

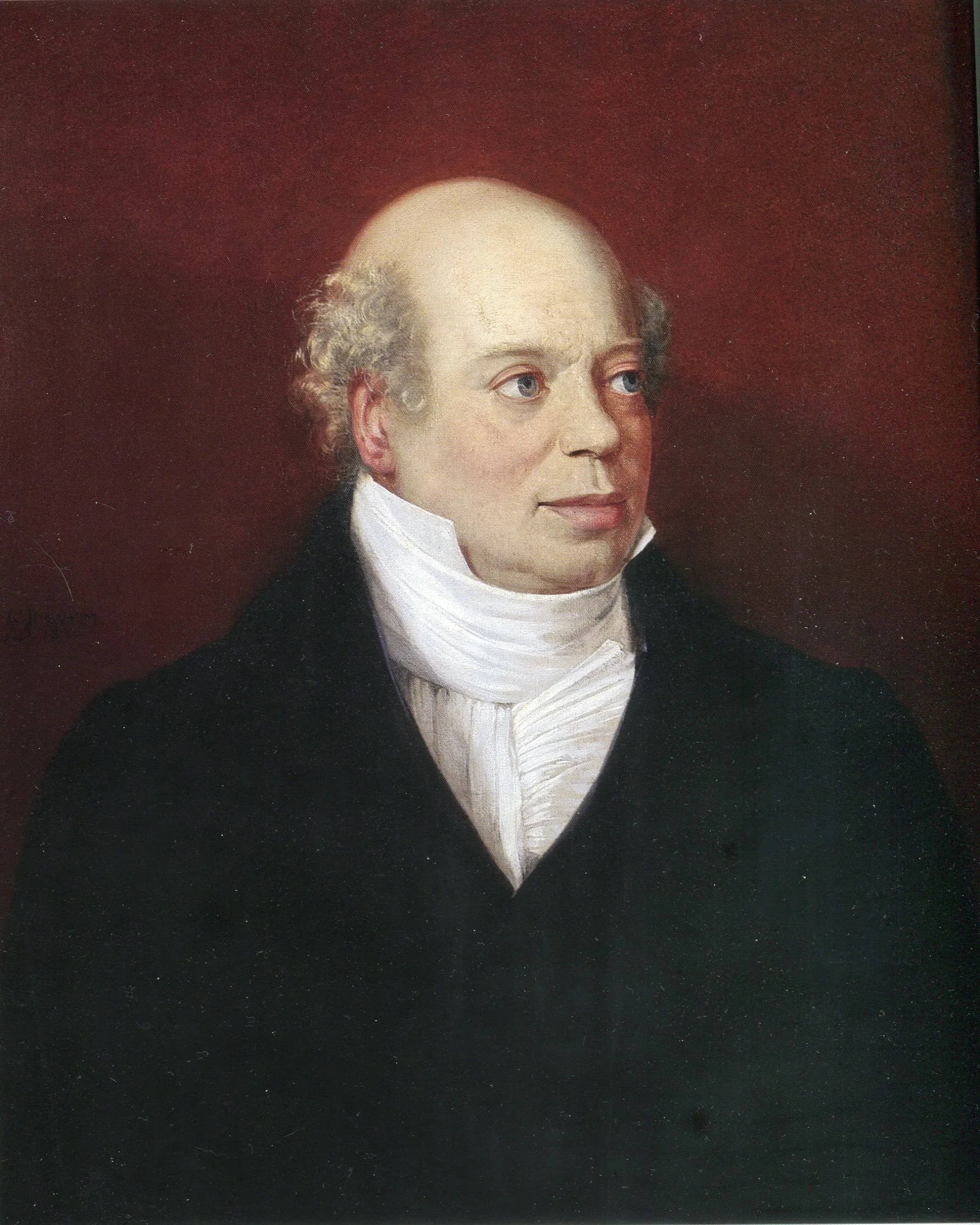
Nathan Mayer Rothschild, founder of the English branch of the Rothschild family

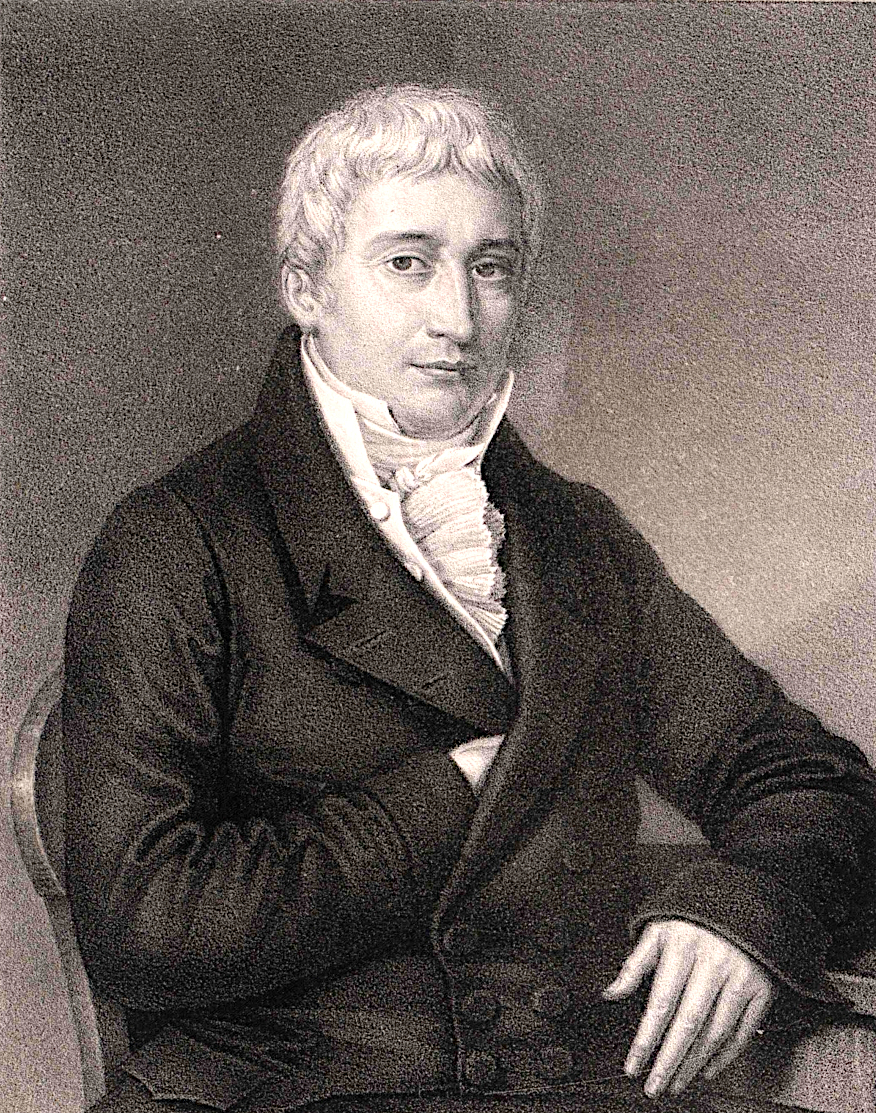
Georg Simon von Sina of the Sina family

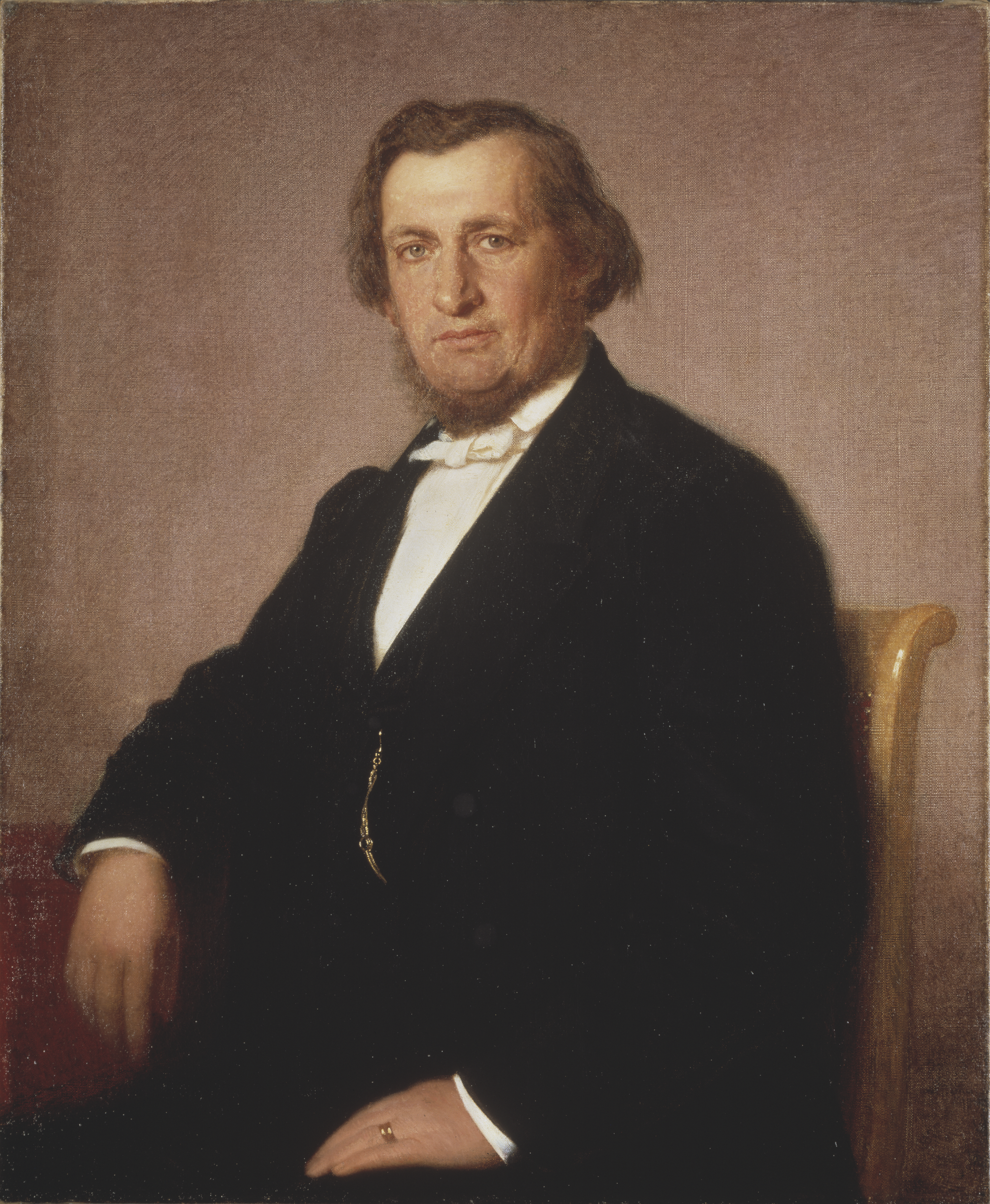
André Oscar Wallenberg founder of Wallenberg family, by Gustav Uno Troili

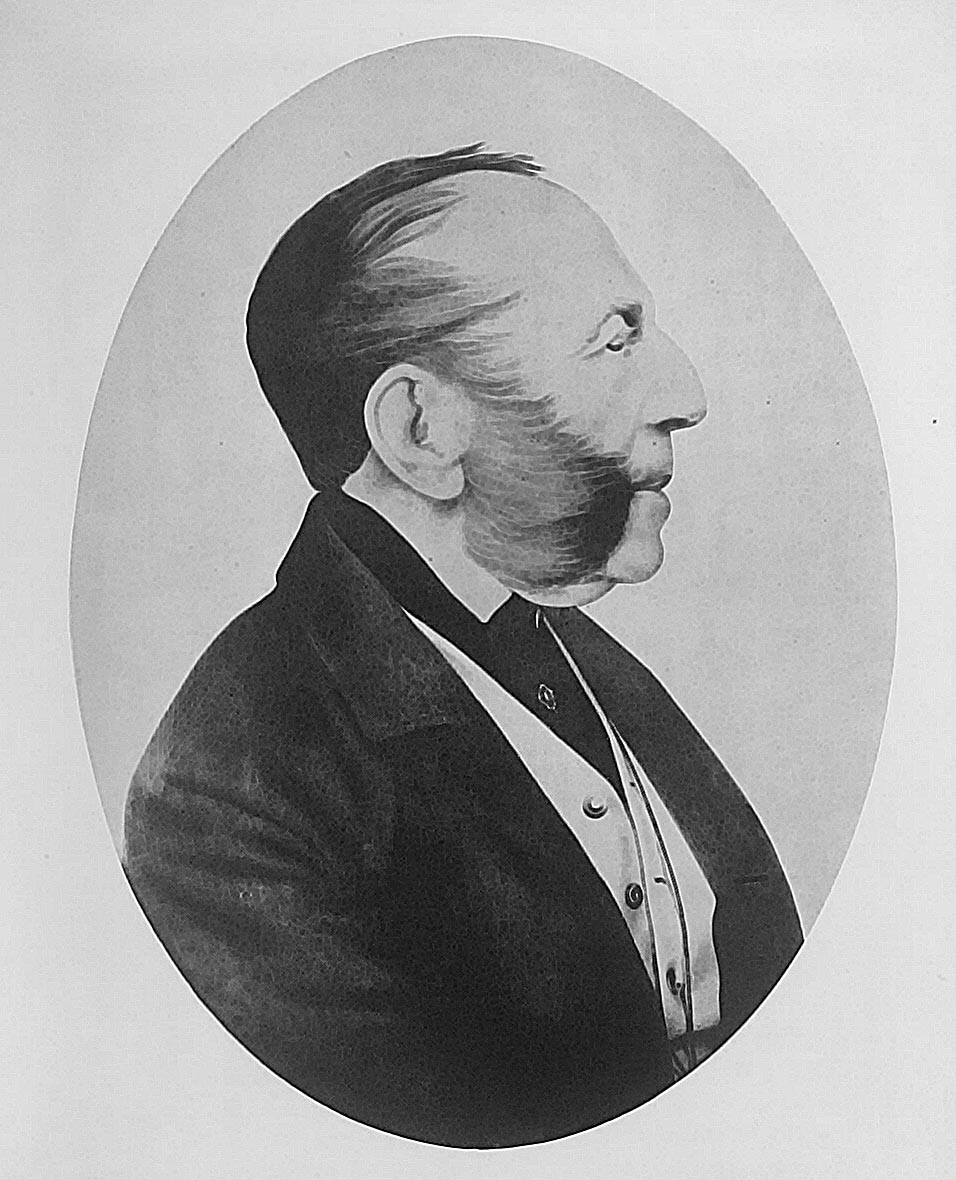
Captain Robert Melville Grindlay, of the Grindlay family and founder of Grindlays Bank

Family	Companies	Place of origin	Principal countries of residence
Aguiar	Banco Bradesco	Osasco	Brazil
Alrajhi	Alrajhi Bank	Riyadh	Saudi Arabia
Altoviti		Florence	Republic of Florence
Andries Pels & Sons		Amsterdam	Dutch Republic
Barclay	Barclays	London	UK
Bardi	Compagnia dei Bardi	Florence	Republic of Florence
Baring	Barings Bank, Baring Vostok Capital Partners	Bremen	Germany, UK
Berenberg-Gossler-Seyler	Berenberg Bank	Antwerp	Belgium, Germany
Bordier	Bordier & Cie	Geneva	Switzerland
Birla	UCO Bank	Pilani	India
Bose	Credit Capital Finance, Etonhurst, Lazard CreditCapital, Tamara Capital Advisors	Mumbai	India
Botín	Banco Santander, Bankinter	Santander	Spain
Brandts		Hamburg	Germany, UK
Carrión	Banco Popular de Puerto Rico	Puerto Rico	United States
Cerchi		Valdarno, Tuscany	Republic of Florence
Chigi	Banco Chigi	Siena	Republic of Siena
Clifford		Clifford, Herefordshire	UK, Netherlands
Corsi		Florence	Republic of Florence
Coutts	Coutts & Company	London	UK
d’Erlanger	Erlanger & Sons (later part of Dresdner Bank), Emile Erlanger & Co. (later part of Lloyds TSB)	Frankfurt	Germany, France, UK
Espírito Santo	Banco Espírito Santo	Lisbon	Portugal
Fugger		Augsburg	Germany
Finck	Merck, Finck & Co	Munich	Germany
Goldman–Sachs	Goldman Sachs	New York	USA
Gondi		Florence	Republic of Florence
Grindlay	Grindlays Bank (later part of Standard Chartered)	London	UK
Hinduja	IndusInd Bank, S.P. Hinduja Banque Privée	Mumbai	India, UK, Switzerland
Hoare	C. Hoare & Co	London	UK
Hochstetter		Höchstädt	Germany
Hope	Hope & Co. (later part of ABN-Amro)	Amsterdam	Netherlands
Jagat Seth		Nagaur	Bengal Subah
Khanna	Bridge Capital Advisors, Etonhurst, FiNoble Advisors, Yog Capital Advisors	Delhi	India, UK
Koç	Yapı Kredi	Istanbul	Turkey
Kotak	Kotak Mahindra Bank	Mumbai	India
Ladenburg	Bankhaus Ladenburg	Mannheim	Germany
Lazard	Lazard	New Orleans	USA
Li	Bank of East Asia	Hong Kong	Hong Kong
Liechtenstein	LGT Group	Liechtenstein Castle, Lower Austria, Austria	Principality of Liechtenstein
M. Ct.	Indian Overseas Bank	Tamil Nadu	India
Maranghi Castellini Baldissera	Mediobanca, Castellini & Co. (later part of Banca Barclays Castellini), Banca Lombarda	Milan	Italy
Mallet	Neuflize OBC	Rouen, Geneva	France, Switzerland
Medici		Florence	Republic of Florence
Mellon	Bank of New York Mellon	Pittsburgh, PA	USA
Metzler	Metzler Bank	Frankfurt	Germany
Miles	Miles & Co (later part of NatWest)	Bristol	UK
Montagu	Samuel Montagu & Co. (later part of HSBC)	London	UK
Moreira Salles	Unibanco, Itaú Unibanco	São Paulo	Brazil
Morgan	Morgan Stanley, J.P. Morgan Chase	New York	USA
Oppenheim	Sal. Oppenheim, Deutsche Bank	Cologne	Germany
Ovadiah	Wadiah Capital	Iraq	Switzerland, Panama, Great Britain, Israel
Ovia	Zenith Bank	Lagos	Nigeria
Peruzzi		Florence	Republic of Florence
Pictet	Pictet Group	Geneva	Switzerland
Przanowski	SKOK II Credit Union in Warsaw, Bank Polski (today PKO Bank Polski, Bank Śląski (later part of ING Bank Śląski), Bank Dyskontowy (later part of Narodowy Bank Polski)	Warsaw	Poland
Rockefeller	Rockefeller Financial Services (Rockefeller & Co), Chase Bank	Cleveland, OH, New York, NY	USA
Riario		Savona	Province of Savona
Rothschild	Rothschild & Co (Rothschild Martin Maurel), RIT Capital Partners, Edmond de Rothschild Group (Edmond de Rothschild Heritage, Edmond de Rothschild Foundations)	Frankfurt	UK, France, Switzerland
S. Rm. M.	Indian Bank	Tamil Nadu	India
Sabancı	Akbank	Istanbul	Turkey
Safra	Safra Group (Banco Safra, J. Safra Sarasin, Safra National Bank of New York)	Beirut	Brazil
Salviati		Florence	Republic of Florence
Scali		Florence	Republic of Florence
Schröder	Schroders	Hamburg	Germany
Setúbal	Itaúsa (Banco Itaú, Itaú Unibanco)	São Paulo	Brazil
Simonetti		Rome	Italy, UK, Israel
Sina	Bankhaus Sina	Moscopole	Austrian Empire
Smith	Smith's Bank (later part of NatWest)	Nottingham	UK
Solaro		Asti	Italy
Strozzi		Florence	Republic of Florence
Van De Put	Van De Put & Co Private Bankers	Antwerp	Belgium
Van Lanschot	F. van Lanschot Bankiers	Zundert	Netherlands
Villela	Itaúsa (Banco Itaú, Itaú Unibanco)	São Paulo	Brazil
Wallenberg	Skandinaviska Enskilda Banken, Investor, Patricia Industries, FAM AB, Wallenberg Foundations	Linköping, Stockholm, Lund	Sweden
Warburg	M. M. Warburg & Co., Warburg Pincus, UBS	Hamburg	Germany
Welser		Augsburg	Germany

== See also ==
- Private bank
- Private banking
