= Fink =

Fink may refer to:

== People and fictional characters ==
- Fink (surname), a list of people and fictional characters
- Fink (singer), English singer and songwriter Fin Greenall (born 1972)
- Billie Joe Armstrong (born 1972), also known as Fink and Wilhelm Fink, American punk rock guitarist, singer and songwriter
- Howard Finkel, also known as The Fink, professional wrestling announcer
- Fink, a red fox in the 2024 animated film The Wild Robot

== Places in the United States ==
- Fink, Texas, an unincorporated community
- Fink, West Virginia, an unincorporated community
- Fink Run, West Virginia, a stream

== Other uses ==
- slang for informant
- Fink (software), a collaborative computing project to port Unix programs to Mac OS X
- Fink (album), a 1989 album by the Swamp Zombies
- Rat Fink, a cartoon character from "Kustom Kulture" hot rod detailing
- 10891 Fink, an asteroid

== See also ==
- Fink effect, a factor in medical anaesthesia
- Finks motorcycle club, an Australian outlaw motorcycle club
- Jesse Fink, British-Australian author
- Jim Finks (1927–1994), American football player, coach and executive
- F*INK, a free weekly event guide in Dunedin, New Zealand
- Finke (disambiguation)
- Fincke, a list of people with the surname
