= Flinck =

Flinck is a surname. Notable people with the surname include:

- Govert Flinck (1615–1660), Dutch painter
- Markku Flinck (born 1985), Finnish ice hockey player
- Thorsten Flinck (born 1961), Swedish actor, director, and musician
- Anni Flinck (1915–1990), Finnish politician
- Miro Flinck (born 1998), Finnish cell and molecular biology

== See also ==
- Finck
