= August François von Finck =

German businessman

- Born: May 2, 1968 (age 58); Germany
- Education: Georgetown University (MBA in 1999)
- Occupations: Businessman, investor
- Known for: Major shareholder in SGS, Von Roll, Mövenpick, Bank von Roll AG
- Parent: August von Finck Jr.
- Relatives: Wilhelm von Finck (great-grandfather)

August François von Finck (born 2 May 1968) is a German businessman and the son of August von Finck, Jr., thus grandson of August von Finck, Sr. August François von Finck's great-grandfather Wilhelm von Finck was the co-founder of the private bank Merck Finck & Co., the insurance companies Munich Re and Allianz – the second largest international insurance and financial services organization in the world. He is a German citizen but has his official residence in Switzerland.

== Early life and education ==
Von Finck earned an MBA from Georgetown Business School.

As a member of the board of advisors of Georgetown University, where he obtained his MBA in 1999, he holds the majority of important companies such as SGS and Von Roll Holding AG in tandem with his family. August François von Finck has two brothers, Maximilian Rudolph von Finck (b. 1969) and Luitpold Ferdinand von Finck (b. 1971) and one sister, Maria Theresia von Finck.

Known simply as François von Finck during his high school days, he attended the Darrow School in New Lebanon, New York.

== Professional activities ==
Since 2001, François von Finck has been on the supervisory board of Staatl. Mineralbrunnen AG in Bad Brückenau, and since July 2001, he has been the Chairman of the Board of Directors of Carlton-Holding AG in Allschwil, Switzerland, which controls almost 100% of Mövenpick. Through the Shareholder Group von Finck, he is a partner in the globally active Swiss industrial conglomerate Von Roll Holding AG. His family controls the majority of voting rights there. The Shareholder Group von Finck also holds 14.96% (as of November 11, 2009: 25.5%) of capital and voting shares in the internationally active Swiss goods testing company SGS SA and François von Finck holds at least 3% of the shares there.

Furthermore, François von Finck has been on the supervisory board of the Finck'schen investment and real estate company Custodia Holding AG based in Munich since 1999 - a company that took over 25.8% of Hochtief AG shares in 2006 and sold them in the spring of 2007 with a profit of about half a billion euros.

In May 2004, François von Finck was elected to the supervisory board of RHI AG and held 9% of the share capital. In mid-July 2005, François von Finck left the board and reduced his RHI holdings to below 5% in early September 2005. Since September 2009, François von Finck has also been on the board of directors of Geotherma AG in Zug, Switzerland.

François von Finck also initiated the establishment of the Bank von Roll AG based in Zurich, which began its business operations at the end of January 2009. In 2015, François von Finck was a major shareholder of the bank with over 30,000 shares, holding more than 90% of the company's voting rights. In March 2015, he made an offer to the free shareholders to purchase the remaining shares.
