= Munich Reinsurance America =

American insurance company

- Formerly: American Re-Insurance Corporation
- Industry: reinsurance
- Founded: 1917
- Headquarters: Princeton, New Jersey
- Area served: New Jersey; San Francisco; Chicago; New York City
- Subsidiaries: Munich Re

Munich Reinsurance America (also called Munich Re America), formerly known as American Re-Insurance Corporation before September 2006, is a major provider of property and casualty reinsurance in the United States. Munich Reinsurance America is a subsidiary of Munich Re. Founded in 1917, the company's headquarters are located in Princeton, New Jersey, with regional offices in San Francisco, Chicago, and New York. The company offers services that provide clients with protection from global disasters such as climate change.

== History ==
In 1948, American Re-Insurance purchased the American Reserve Insurance Company. The American Reserve had itself integrated the American Phenix Corporation of New York in 1932 after the liquidation of American Phenix.

== Acquisition ==
In 1996, Munich Re acquired American Re for roughly $3.8 billion. Additional funds were needed to expand reserves for casualty and asbestos policies.
