= Theodor von Cramer-Klett =

German entrepreneur

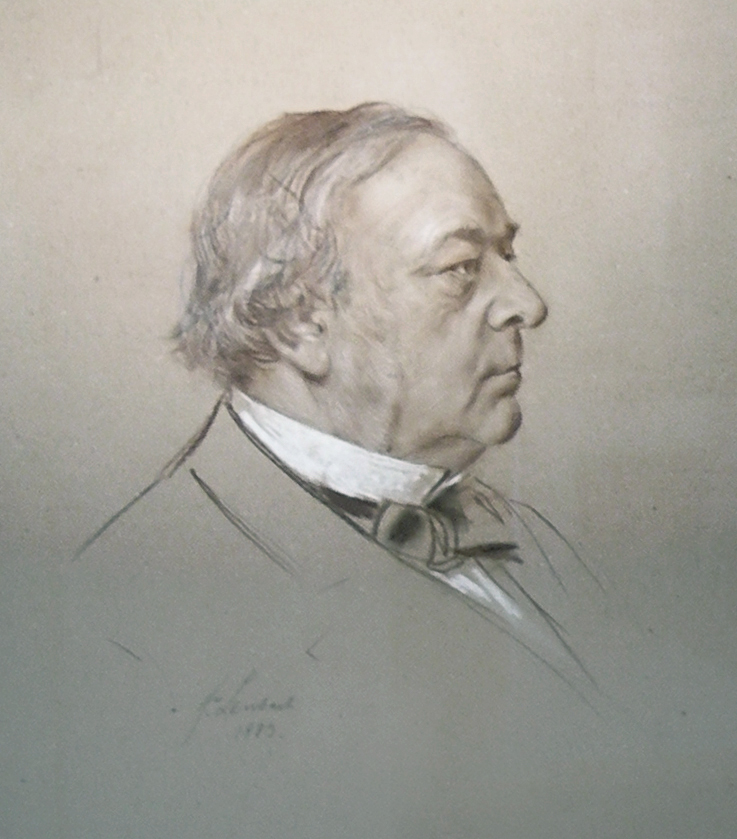
Franz von Lenbach: Theodor von Cramer-Klett, 1883

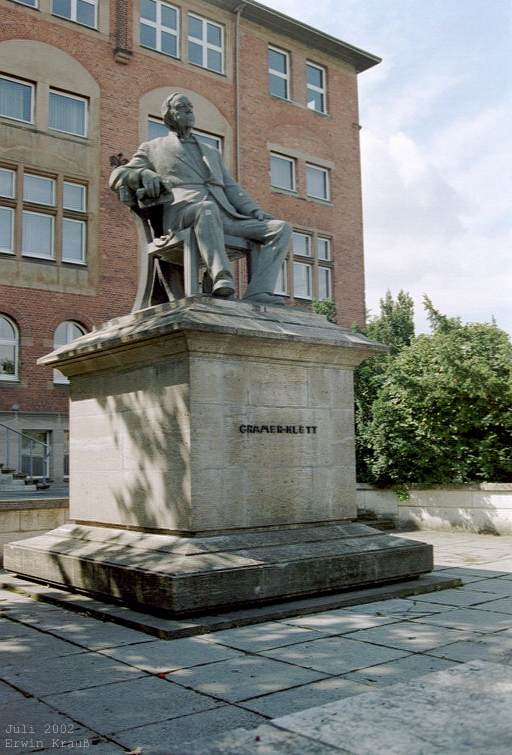
Cramer-Klett-Denkmal (until December 6, 2011) in Nürnberger Frankenstraße, today on MAN work area

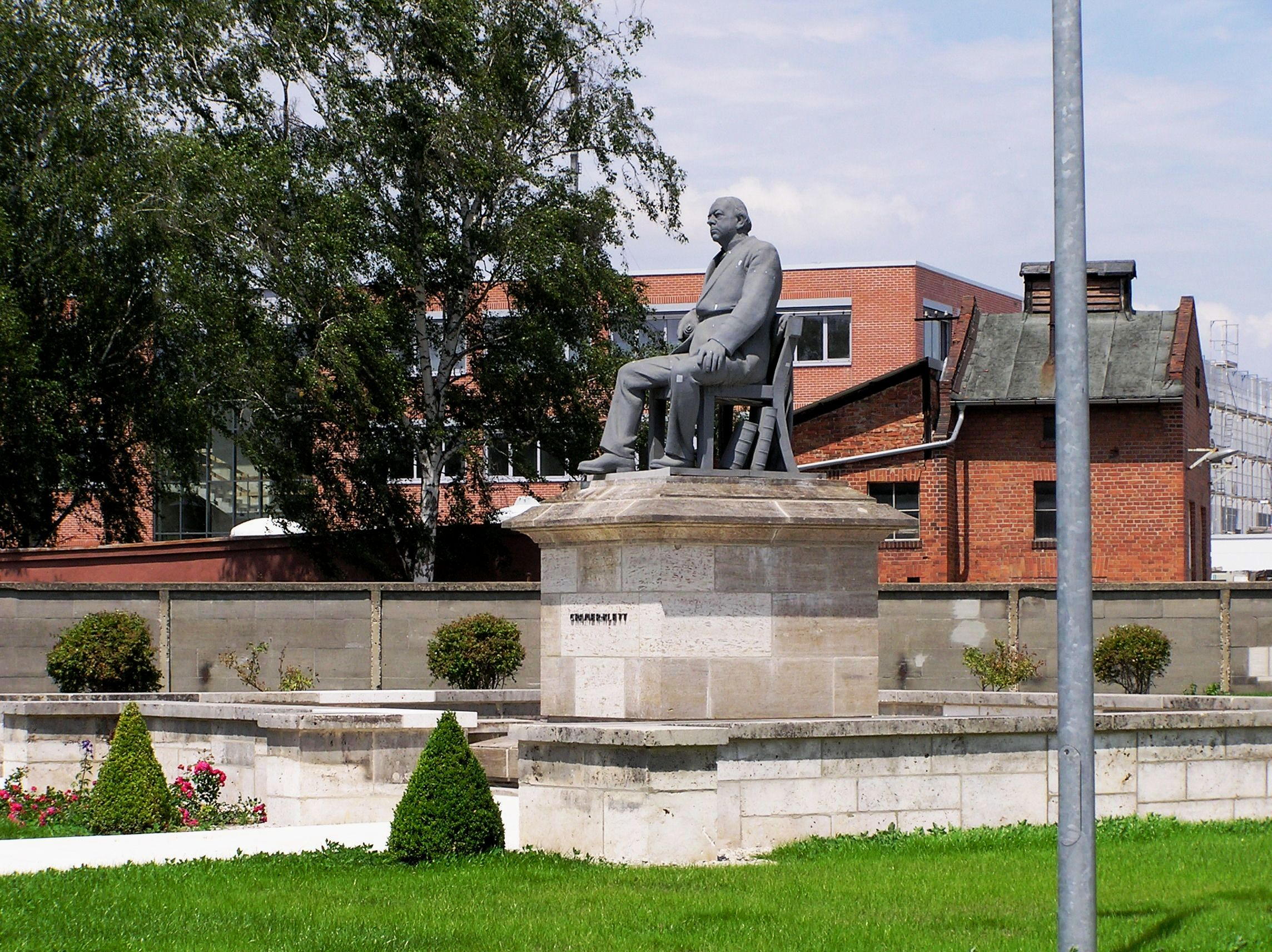
Cramer-Klett-Memorial

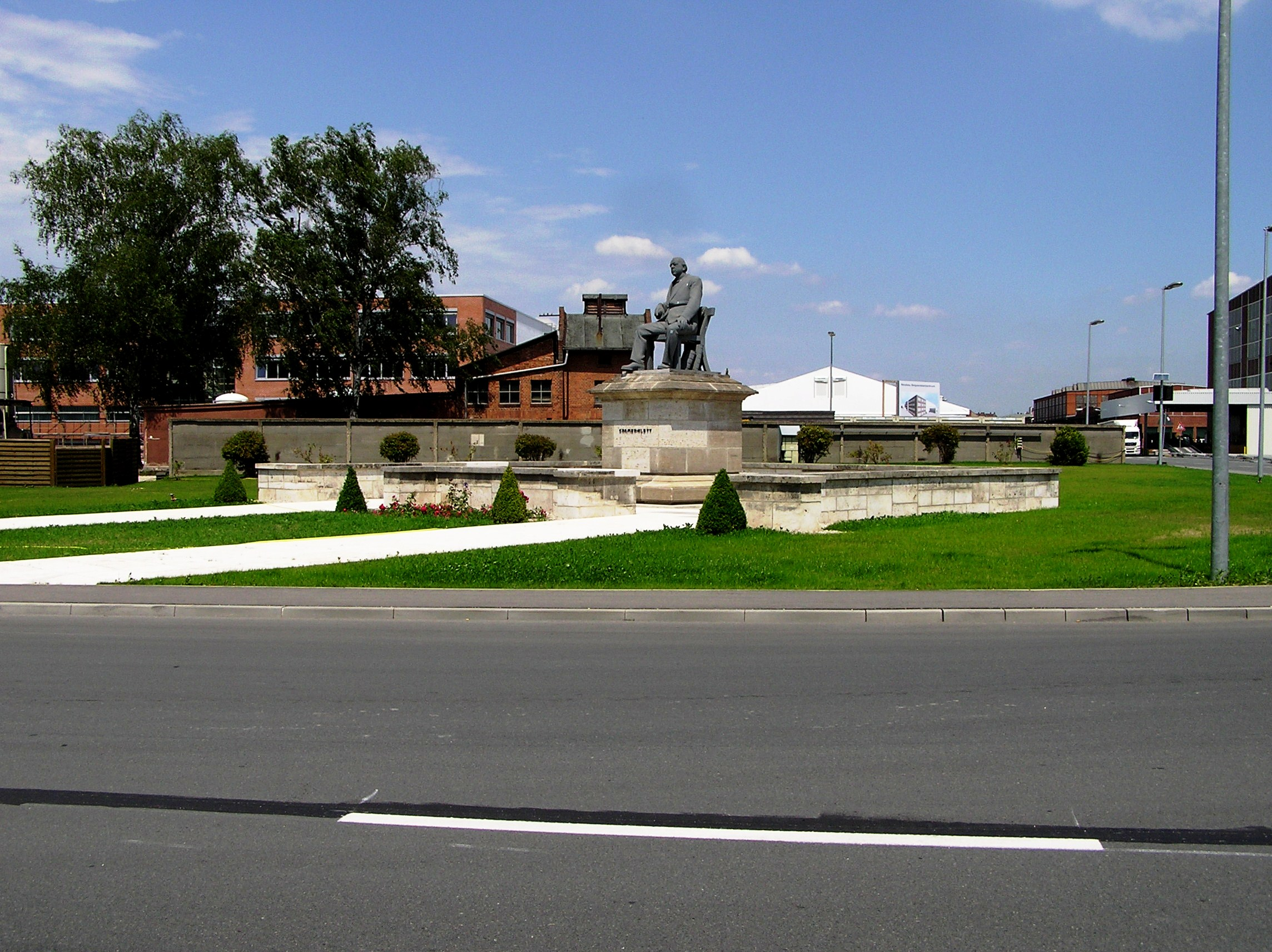
Cramer-Klett-Memorial on MAN area in Nürnberg

Theodor Freiherr von Cramer-Klett (September 27, 1817, in Nuremberg – April 5, 1884, in Aschau im Chiemgau) was a German entrepreneur and banker.

== Life ==
His father was Albert Johann Cramer and his mother was Felicitas Falcke, daughter of entrepreneur Johann Caspar Falcke in Nuremberg. Together with German entrepreneur Wilhelm von Finck and Carl von Thieme he founded company Munich Re in April 1880. He was owner of German company Maschinenbau Actiengesellschaft Nürnberg, which became 1898 German company MAN. Cramer-Klett was founder of German company Süddeutsche Bodencreditbank AG and co-founder of private bank Merck, Christian & Co, which became later Merck Finck & Co, and of German insurance company Münchener Rückversicherungs-Gesellschaft.

He first married Emilie Klett. In second marriage after death of Emilie Klett he was married with Elisabeth Curtze and had one son Theodor von Cramer-Klett junior. Kramer-Klett is buried in Johannis cemetery in Nuremberg.

== Awards and honours ==
- 1854: Nobility
- 1876: Freiherr
- A worker city area in Nuremberg became his name Cramer-Klett-Siedlung.
- Cramer-Klett Memorial in Nuremberg

== Literatur over Cramer-Klett ==
- Bernhard Hoffmann (1957). "Cramer-Klett, Theodor von". Neue Deutsche Biographie (in German). Vol. 3. Berlin: Duncker & Humblot. pp. 394–394. (full text online).
- J. Biensfeldt: Freiherr Dr. Theodor von Cramer-Klett erblicher Reichsrat der Krone Bayern. Sein Leben und Werk, ein Beitrag zur bayerischen Wirtschaftsgeschichte des 19. Jahrhunderts. Leipzig and Erlangen [1922]
- G. Eibert: Unternehmenspolitik Nürnberger Maschinenbauer (1835–1914). Stuttgart 1979
- H. Kluge: Gründer und Erben. Die Münchener Rückversicherungs-Gesellschaft (1880–2007). Munich 2009
- H. Kluge: Der Einfluß des Geschäfts der "Allianz" auf die Entwicklung der "Münchener Rückversicherungs-Gesellschaft" in deren ersten fünfzig Jahren (1880–1930). In: Jahrbuch für Wirtschaftsgeschichte – Economic History Yearbook 2006/2
- H.-J. Rupieper: Arbeiter und Angestellte im Zeitalter der Industrialisierung. Eine sozialgeschichtliche Studie am Beispiel der Maschinenfabriken Augsburg und Nürnberg (M.A.N.) 1837–1914. Frankfurt/M. and New York 1982
- M. Siegl: Die Cramer-Klett's, eine Industriellen-Familie und ihre Bedeutung für das Priental. (Chronik Aschau i. Ch., Quellenband III), Aschau 1998
- Reinhard Spree: Two Chapters on early history of the Munich Reinsurance Company: The Foundation/The San Francisco Earthquake. Department of Economics, LMU Munich, Munich Discussion Paper No. 2010–11, Munich 2010 (online)
- R. Spree: Eine bürgerliche Karriere im deutschen Kaiserreich. Der Aufstieg des Advokaten Dr. jur. Hermann Ritter von Pemsel in Wirtschaftselite und Adel Bayerns. Aachen 2007
