= Carl von Thieme =

German banker

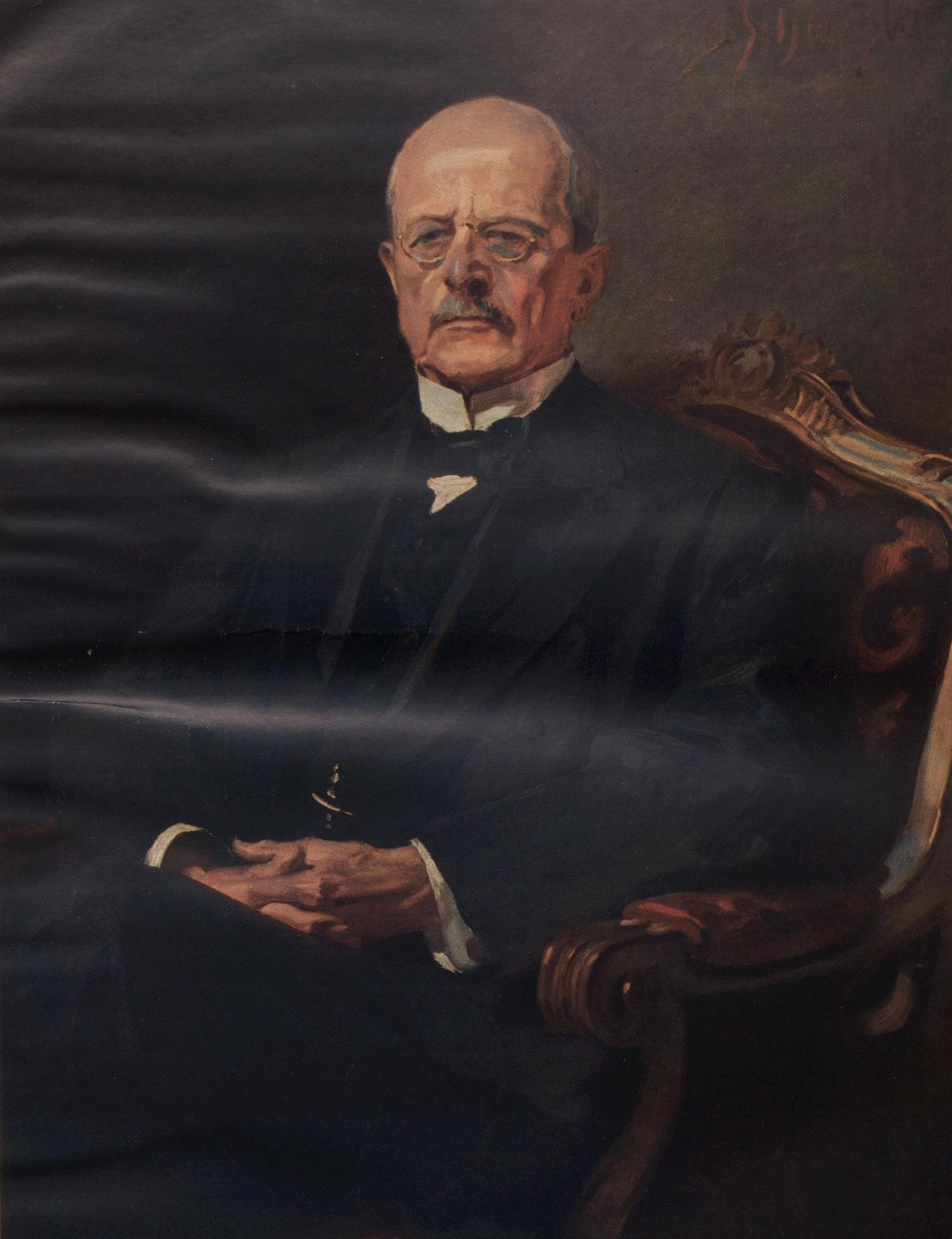
Porträtfoto von Carl Thieme, by Leopold Schmutzler

Carl von Thieme (born 30 April 1844, Erfurt – died 10 October 1924, Munich) was a German banker.

His father was the director of German insurance company Thuringia. In 1880, he founded together with Wilhelm von Finck and Theodor von Cramer-Klett the German insurance company Munich Re, and in 1890 in Berlin was, with von Finck, co-founder of Allianz, a financial services company. Thieme was general director of Munich Re until 1922.

== Awards ==
- 1914: Merit Order of the Bavarian Crown
