= Finke =

Finke may refer to:

== Places ==
=== Australia ===
- Finke, Northern Territory, a community in central Australia now known as Aputula
- Finke bioregion, Northern Territory
- Finke River, central Australia
- Mount Finke, South Australia

=== Hungary ===
- Finke, a village annexed by Edelény, Hungary

== People ==
- Fidelio F. Finke (1891–1968), German composer
- Fritz Finke, 19th-century German/American musician
- Leonhard Ludwig Finke (1747–1837), German physician
- Magdalena Finke (born 1986), German politician
- Meinolf Finke (born 1963), German writer and poet
- Nikki Finke (1953–2022), American journalist
- Peter Finke (born 1944), German theoretical physicist who participated in Pakistan's clandestine nuclear research project
- Roger Finke, 20th-21st century American sociologist
- Tommy Finke (born 1981), German singer/songwriter/composer
- Volker Finke (born 1948), German football player and manager
- William Finke (1814–1864), pioneer in South Australia, sponsor of McDouall Stuart's exploration

== Other uses ==
- Finke coat of arms, a coat of arms used in Germany and Poland
- Finke Desert Race, an annual off-road desert race from Alice Springs to Apatula (aka Finke), Northern Territory, Australia
- Finke Opera House, Missouri, United States, on the National Register of Historic Places

== See also ==
- Finke Gorge National Park, a protected area in the Northern Territory
- Fink (disambiguation)
- Fincke, a list of people with the surname
