= American Phenix Corporation of New York =

American Phenix Corporation of New York was a business incorporated in October 1927 to act as an agent for reinsurance and other insurance companies. It owned and held capital stock and purchased all the stock of the Reinsurance Corporation of America. The business was noteworthy because of its involvement in New York City insurance affairs and its increasing capitalization, prior to its liquidation in November 1932.

Capitalization consisted of 30,000 shares, $50 par of general stock, and 3,000 shares of management stock of no par value. In October 1928 the board of directors voted to increase capitalization to $20,000,000 general capital stock from $1,500,000.

When the company liquidated its stockholders recommended a payment of approximately $3 in cash and one half share of stock in American Reserve Insurance Company, for each share of American Phenix.
