= Leonhard Ludwig Finke =

German physician (1747–1837)

Leonhard Ludwig Finke (1747–1837) was a German medical doctor, known for his contributions to medical geography.

== Life ==
He was born 24 October 1747 in Westerkappeln. He studied medicine from 1769 in the University of Halle, obtaining there in 1772 his doctorate with the dissertation De salubritate febrium in morbis chronicis.

Finke worked as doctor and obstetrician first in Lengerich, Westphalia, and later in Cassel. In 1776 he was employed in Tecklenburg as medical officer and instructor in midwifery. From 1802 he worked in the same capacity in Lingen, remaining there until his death.

== Works ==
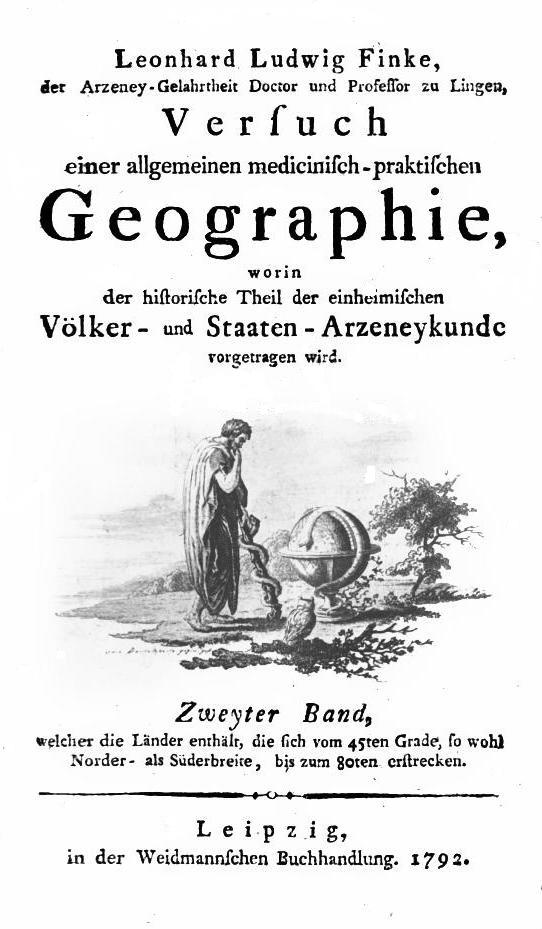
Title page from Leonhard Ludwig Finke, Versuch einer allgemeinen medicinisch-praktischen Geographie vol. 2 (1792)

Finke's major work was Versuch einer allgemeinen medicinisch-praktischen Geographie (3 volumes, 1792–95). It was the first work of medical geography with a world-wide scope. He was influenced by Johann Peter Frank, and encouraged by James Lind. In turn, Finke influenced August Hirsch, and was a precursor of Humboldtian medicine. Finke worked on an unpublished nosological map. It was based on the same principles as the zoological maps of Eberhard August Wilhelm von Zimmermann, but with indigenous diseases instead of animals.
