= Udayan Bose =

Indian investment banker, financier and business executive (1949-2021)

- Born: Udayan Prabhas Bose; 23 April 1949; Kolkata, West Bengal, India
- Died: 6 January 2021 (aged 71); Mumbai, Maharashtra, India
- Education: Presidency University, Kolkata
- Occupations: Investment banker; financier; business executive
- Children: 3

Udayan Prabhas Bose (23 April 1949 – 6 January 2021) was an Indian investment banker, financier and business executive. Bose was one of India's first prominent investment bankers and was also the chairman of Lazard India, the Indian subsidiary of the multinational investment bank Lazard. In 1990, he founded India's first private sector venture capital fund. In 2004, Bose left investment banking and became a financier, focusing on private equity investments, and a business executive. He was also the chairman of Thomas Cook India. During his career, Bose was noted for his success in investments and acquisitions. He died in 2021.

== Early life and education ==
Udayan Prabhas Bose was born on 23 April 1949 in Kolkata, West Bengal, India. Bose came from a middle class family in Kolkota. His father was Prabhas Chandra Bose. Bose attended university in Presidency University, Kolkota, which was then known as Presidency College, Kolkota. He graduated with first-class honours.

Bose also completed a fellowship programme at the London Institute of Banking & Finance (Chartered Institute of Bankers London) in London, England, after which he attended the Advanced Management Programme at Harvard Business School.

== Career ==
=== Investment banking career ===
Bose began his career, in 1970, by joining the investment banking division of Grindlays Bank. He rose to become the Regional Director of Grindlays Asia Pacific, after which he joined Deutsche Bank and became the director of Asia operations. He later became the head of Deuteche Bank's operations in Australia, however in 1984, Bose decided to leave the bank and return to India. After returning to India in 1984, he founded Credit Capital Finance Corporation, one of India's first investment banks. Bose formed Credit Capital in a partnership with the multinational investment bank Lazard Brothers, the then United Kingdom operations of Lazard, which created India's first investment banking venture in which a foreign investment bank was a large partner. He was the chairman of the Credit Capital, and eventually, the venture was named Lazard Credit Capital, of which Bose was also chief executive officer (CEO).

Bose was involved in various notable deals during his time as chairman and CEO of Lazard Credit Capital. In 1996, Lazard Credit Capital was involved in a takeover battle for Ahmedabad Electricity, which was seen as controversial at the time. In 1997, the company advised Bombay Dyeing while the company was in the midst one of India's first hostile takeover battles. In 1999, Lazard Credit Capital advised the Nashik Municipal Corporation in a fundraise for infrastructure projects. Bose also formed India's first private sector venture capital fund in 1990.

Also in 1999, Lazard Brothers increased its share in Lazard Credit Capital and renamed the company Lazard India, and Bose became chairman of Lazard India. In 2000, Bose was appointed as global managing director of Lazard's global operations. In 2002, Lazard India was a joint venture between Lazard Worldwide and Udayan Bose, with bose sides owning 50% each. It is active in corporate finance (mergers and acquisitions), privatisation and restructuring. Bose's time as the chairman of Lazard India was notable. He acted as an advisor for various notable deals, which included the RPG Group's takeover of His Master's Voice, organising the joint venture between Rediffusion and Dentsu, and advising Zuari Cement in their bid for Sree Vishnu Cement.

Bose sold his shares in Lazard India in 2004 and left investment banking as a career. It was speculated that he left Lazard due to differences with the head of Lazard at the time, Bruce Wasserstein.

=== Financier and later career ===
After leaving Lazard in 2004, Bose became a financier and held various other positions as well. In 2004, Bose founded and became chairman of Tamara Capital advisors, a private equity investment company. In 2006, Bose led a consortium of investors to buy into a preferred equity offering of United Western Bank (UWB), an Indian private bank. However, the Reserve Bank of India, India's central bank, rejected the proposal to allow private equity investors to infuse capital in UWB. During his time as chairman of Tamara Capital Advisors, Bose in 2009, was part of the Amit Mitra Expert Committee, which focused on developing funding for Indian Railways' infrastructure projects via public-private partnerships.

In 2006 he also joined Thomas Cook India (TCIL), a travel agency and services company, as chairman of the company. Bose stated that his goals for TCIL were to make it a full scale travel services company through acquisitions and to scale TCIL to larger company size. In August 2006, TCIL acquired Thomas Cook (Thailand). Also in August 2006, TCIL acquired Travel Corporation of India (TCI), and incorporated it as a subsidiary to retain's TCI brand name, and also acquired TT Enterprises, a visa services company. In 2007, TCIL signed a memorandum of understanding (MoU) with JTB Corporation, a Japanese travel agency. The MoU gave TCIL access to JTB Corporation's network in 30 countries and affiliates across 800 offices, and JTB Corporation entered the Indian market via TCIL. By 2008, TCIL was India's largest foreign exchange and second largest travel company. In 2008, 74.9% of the issued share capital of TCIL was acquired by Thomas Cook Group and Bose continued as chairman of TCIL.

During his financier and later career, Bose was also a director in various companies, which included Reliance Capital, JK Paper and Pritish Nandy Communications. Bose also served as the chairman of the Corporate Finance Committee of the Federation of Indian Chambers of Commerce & Industry (FICCI) and as the chairman of the Calcutta Stock Exchange.

== Personal life and death ==
Bose was married and had one daughter, Piusha, and two sons, one of whom being Tushar. Tushar, who started his career in investment banking, is an investor and a co-founder of Etonhurst, a real estate private equity firm. Tushar is also a partner in the mining company Ethiopotash, along with Aditya Khanna, who is also a non-executive partner at Etonhurst. Bose died in 2021, and was survived by his wife and three children.
