= Fink Run =

Stream in West Virginia, U.S.

Coordinates: 38°59′56″N 80°13′48″W

Fink Run is a stream in the U.S. state of West Virginia. It is a tributary of the Buckhannon River.

Fink Run most likely was named after Henry Fink, an early settler.

== See also ==
- List of rivers of West Virginia
