= Fink, West Virginia =

Unincorporated community in West Virginia, United States

- Unincorporated community
- Location within the state of West Virginia Fink (the United States)
- Coordinates: 39°6′36″N 80°38′55″W
- Country: United States
- State: West Virginia
- County: Lewis
- Elevation: 856 ft (261 m)
- Time zone: UTC-5 (Eastern (EST))
  - Summer (DST): UTC-4 (EDT)
- GNIS ID: 1549681

Fink is an unincorporated community in Lewis County, West Virginia, United States. Its post office is closed.

The community was named after nearby Fink Creek.
