= Fincke =

Fincke is a surname. Notable people with the surname include:

- Caspar Fincke (1584–1655), Bohemian-Danish court smith
- Clarence Fincke (1874–1959), American football player and banker
- Gödik Fincke (c. 1546–1617), Finnish-born Swedish nobleman and military officer
- George Fincke (1953–2016), American Anglican bishop
- Michael Fincke (born 1967), American astronaut
- Thomas Fincke (1561–1656), Danish mathematician, physicist and professor
- William Fincke (1878–1927), American football player, pacifist minister and educator

== See also ==
- Finke (disambiguation)
