= Munich Re =

German reinsurance company

Munich Re Group
- Trade name: Munich Re
- Native name: Münchener Rückversicherungs-Gesellschaft Aktiengesellschaft in München
- Type: Aktiengesellschaft
- Traded as: FWB: MUV2; DAX Component
- Industry: Financial services
- Founded: 3 April 1880; 146 years ago
- Headquarters: Munich, Germany
- Area served: Worldwide
- Key people: Joachim Wenning (chairman of the Board of Management), Nikolaus von Bomhard (chairman of the supervisory board)
- Products: Insurance; General insurance; Health insurance; Vehicle insurance; Travel insurance; Home insurance; Life insurance; Reinsurance; Mortgage loans; Investment management; Asset management
- Revenue: ▲€60.40 billion (2025)
- Operating income: ▲€7.51 billion (2025)
- Net income: ▲€6.12 billion (2025)
- Total assets: ▲€284.5 billion (2025)
- Total equity: ▲€33.40 billion (2025)
- Number of employees: 43,500 (2025)
- Subsidiaries: Ergo Group; MEAG; HDFC ERGO General Insurance Company
- Website: www.munichre.com

Munich Re Group or Munich Reinsurance Company (German: Münchener Rück; Münchener Rückversicherungs-Gesellschaft) is a German multinational insurance company based in Munich, Germany. It is the world's largest reinsurer. ERGO, a subsidiary of Munich Re, serves as the primary insurance arm of the Group. Munich Re's shares are publicly listed. Munich Re is included in the DAX index at the Frankfurt Stock Exchange, the Euro Stoxx 50, and other indices.

== History ==
In 1880 Carl von Thieme, a native of Erfurt who was the representative in Bavaria of his father's Thuringia insurance company, founded in Munich Münchener Rückversicherungs-Gesellschaft together with Wilhelm von Finck (co-owner of the Merck Finck & Co. bank) and Theodor von Cramer-Klett. This was followed by the founding of Allianz Versicherungs-Gesellschaft in 1890 in Berlin. Carl von Thieme was head of Munich Re until 1921, and Wilhelm von Finck served as Chairman of the supervisory board until 1924. Munich Re became renowned after the San Francisco earthquake of 1906 as the only insurer that remained solvent after paying out all the claims, a total of 15.5 million Marks.

During the Nazi dictatorship Munich Re benefited from anti-Semitic persecution. Jewish customers had to cancel their life insurance policies prematurely leading to huge profits for the insurance companies. At the same time Munich Re could acquire several properties owned by Jews at prices below the market rate. Starting from 1940 the company was involved in Allianz' insurance business with the SS: Munich Re served as reinsurance company for contracts insuring the barracks and operations in the concentration and extermination camps Auschwitz, Buchenwald, Dachau, Neuengamme, Ravensbrück, Sachsenhausen and Stutthof. Supervisory board member Kurt Schmitt joined the NSDAP and SS in 1933 and took the position as Reich Economy Minister for one year. In 1938 he became Director General of Munich Re and stayed in this position until the American military authorities relieved him of all offices at the end of the war.

In February 2010, U.S. investor Warren Buffett became Munich Re's largest single shareholder. As of December 2015, he reduced his holdings to less than 3 percent.

In 2025, the company's shareholders' equity amounted to €32.75 billion. The group's premium income for the year (gross premiums written) was €60.4 billion, with its consolidated result amounting to €6.12 million.

== Structure ==
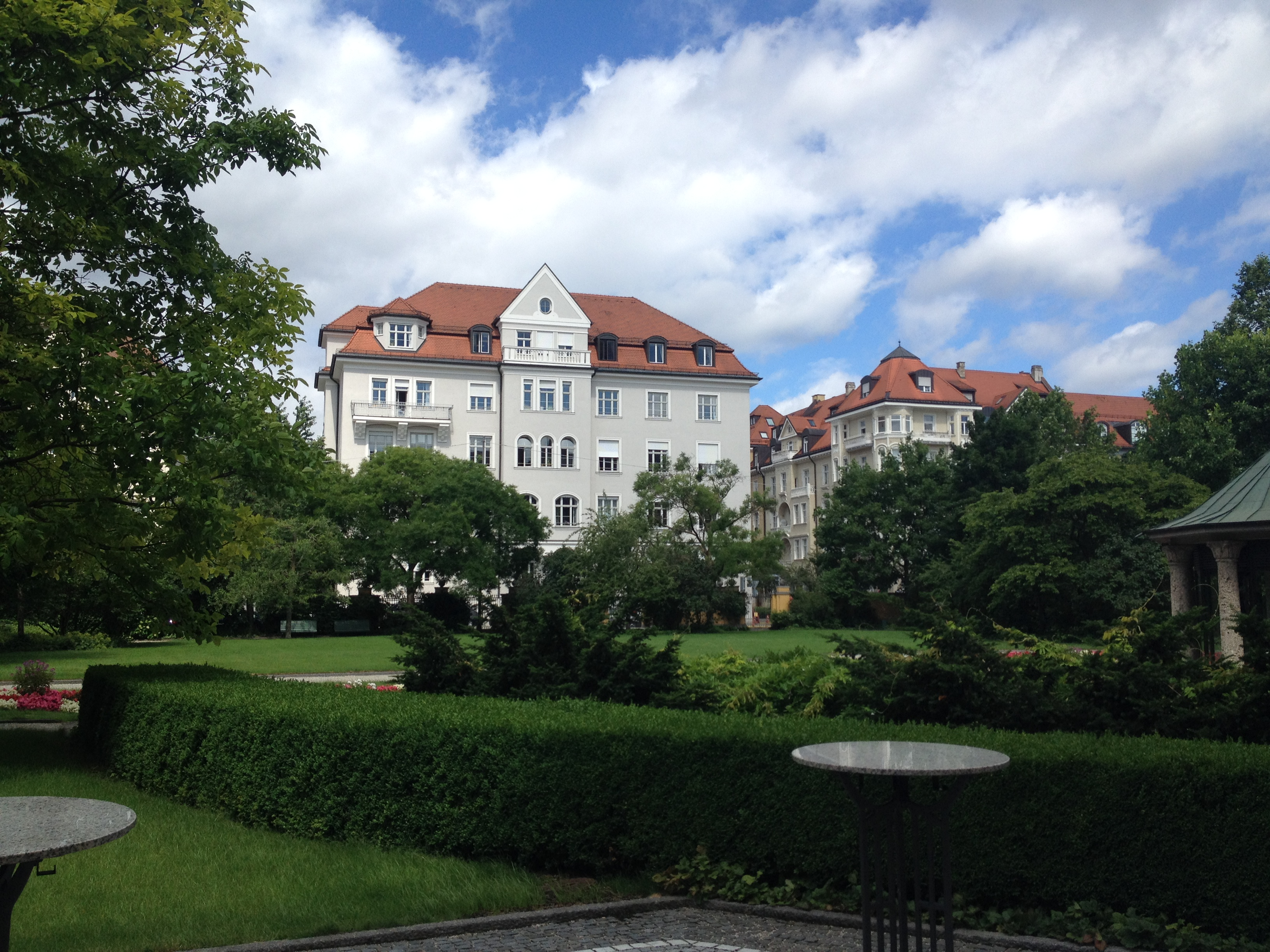
Munich Re courtyards

Besides its reinsurance business, the Munich Re Group also transacts primary insurance business through the Ergo Group and, since 1999, asset management through MEAG (MUNICH ERGO AssetManagement GmbH).

=== Reinsurance ===
Munich Re has clients (insurance companies) worldwide. It assures part of the risk covered by these insurance companies, as well as providing comprehensive advice on insurance business. In addition to its Munich head office, Munich Re has more than 50 Business Units around the world. Munich Re provides reinsurance cover for life, health, property, casualty, transport, aviation, space, fire and engineering business. In 2018, gross premiums written in the reinsurance segment amounted to around €31.3bn.

=== Primary insurance – ERGO Group ===
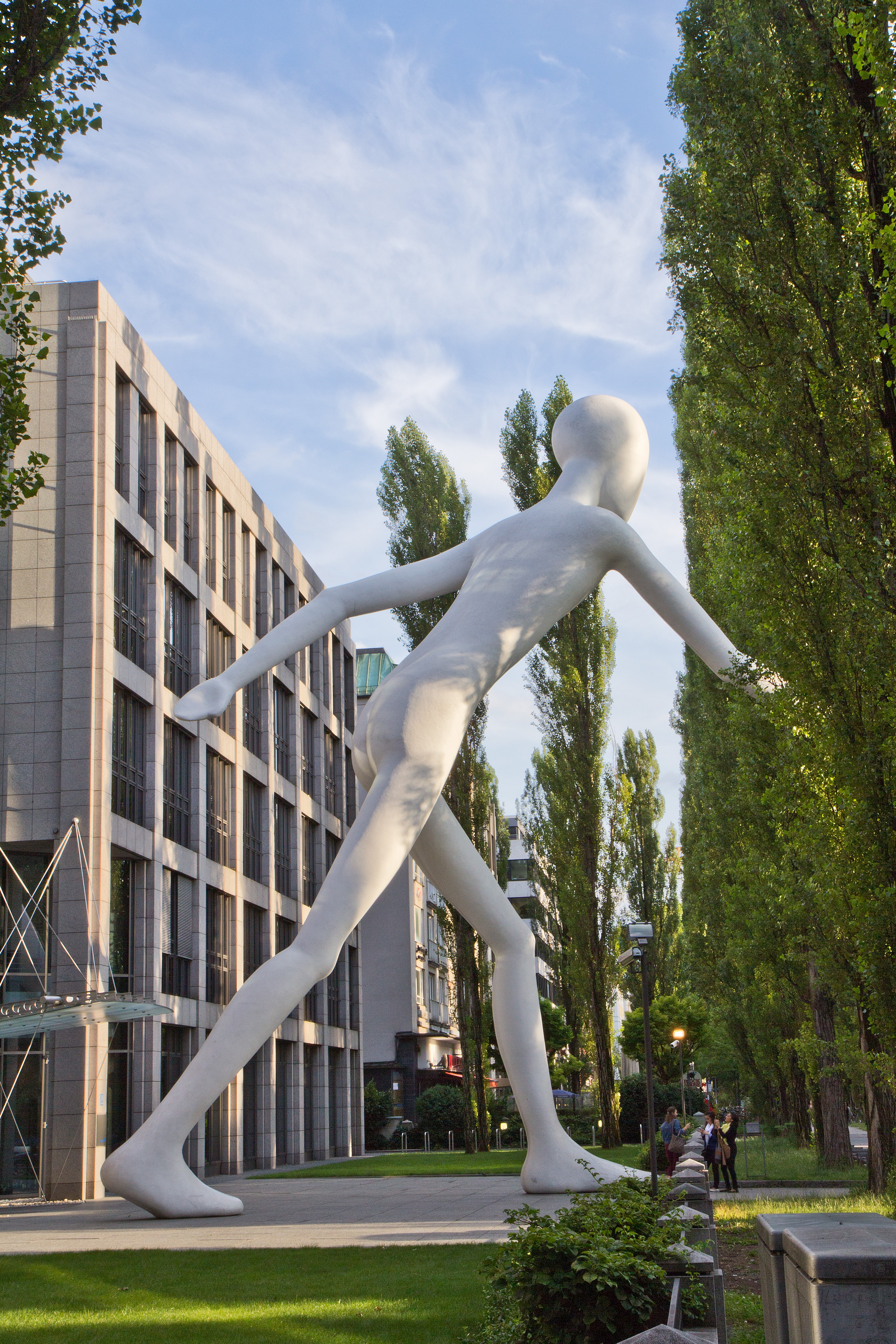
Walking Man by Jonathan Borofsky in front of the business premises on Munich's Leopoldstraße

Munich Re's primary insurance operations are mainly concentrated in the ERGO Insurance Group. ERGO writes all types of life and health insurance and most types of property and casualty insurance. Outside Germany, ERGO is present in more than 30 countries around the world, servicing around 35 million clients. Members of the ERGO Group include the insurance subsidiaries D.A.S., DKV and Europäische Reiseversicherung AG, and the IT service provider ITERGO. With a gross premium written of about €21.7bn in 2025, ERGO is one of the largest primary insurers in Germany and Europe.

=== Asset management ===
Founded in 1999, MEAG (MUNICH ERGO Asset Management GmbH) manages the assets of Munich Re, ERGO, and external clients. Their purpose is to manage and increase investments of Munich Re and ERGO and third parties. As of 31 December 2025, MEAG assets under management amounts to €368 billion and is therefore one of the largest European asset management companies.

== Ownership ==
Free float is stated to be nearly 100%, with around 366,000 shareholders (December 2025).

Shareholder profile:

- Institutional investors (75.7%)
- Private investors (24.3%)

Most shareholders are located in Germany (around 44.2%), followed by North America (18.5%), other European countries (19.9%), UK (16.5%), other countries (0.9%).

=== Subsidiaries ===
- Munich Reinsurance America
- American Modern Insurance Group
- Hartford Steam Boiler Inspection and Insurance Company
- Munich Reinsurance Trading LLC

== Key figures ==
Accounts prepared according to IFRS.

Key figures Munich Re
Year	2005	2006	2007	2008	2009	2010	2011	2012	2013	2014	2015	2016	2017	2018	2019	2020	2021
Gross premiums written (€bn)	38.2	37.4	37.3	37.8	41.4	45.5	49.5	52	51.1	48.8	50.4	48.9	49.1	49.1	51.5	54,9	59,6
Operating result (€m)	4,156	5,877	5,573	3,834	4,721	3,978	1,180	5,350	4,409	4,027	4,819	4,025	1,241	3,725	3,430	1,986	3,517
Taxes on income (€m)	1,014	1,648	801	1,372	1,264	692	-552	866	-108	312	-476	-760	298	-576	-483	-269	-552
Consolidated result (€m)	2,751	3,519	3,923	1,579	2,564	2,422	712	3,211	3,342	3,171	3,122	2,581	392	2,275	2,707	1,211	3,517
Investments (€bn)	177.2	176.9	176.2	174.9	182.2	193.1	201.7	213.8	202.2	218.9	217.6	221.8	217.6	216.9	228.8	232.95	240.3
Technical provisions (€bn)	154.0	153.9	152.4	157.2	163.9	171.1	181.2	186.1	187.7	198.4	198.5	202.2	205.8	208.3	217.9	221.5	234.0
Equity (€bn)	24.3	26.3	25.3	21.1	22.3	23.0	23.3	27.4	26.2	30.3	31.0	31.8	28.2	26.5	30.6	30.0	30.9
Return on equity (%)	12.5	14.1	15.3	7.0	11.8	10.4	3.3	12.6	12.5	11.3	10.0	8.1	1.3	8.4	11.7	5.3	12.6
Number of employees as of 31. December	37,953	37,210	38,634	44,209	47,249	46,915	47,206	45,437	44,665	43,316	43,554	45,437	42,410	41,410	39,662	39,642	39,281

== Munich Re Foundation ==
The Munich Re Foundation is a charitable organisation, which was founded by Munich Re; the foundation started its work on 7 April 2005.

The foundation is equipped with a capital of €50 million and works predominantly in newly industrializing and developing countries. The main topics of the foundation are:

- Environmental and climatic changes
- Microinsurance and poverty reduction
- Water as a resource and risk factor
- Disaster prevention.

The prime concern of the foundation is to develop solutions for people at risk. The knowledge of Munich Re's experts should therefore be translated into action. Hence, the working motto of the foundation is 'Munich Re Foundation – from knowledge to action'. The main activities of the foundation concentrate on four fields: knowledge accumulation and implementation, clarification and sensitisation, networking of experts as well as direct help and support of local projects.

The foundation works with local, national as well as international partners. The majority of projects fit within a global framework. Since adaptation to climate and environmental change is much more difficult for poorer countries, the focus of the foundation is primarily on people in the developing world.

== Munich Re Art Collection ==
The Munich Re Art Collection's history begins with the company's founding by Carl von Thieme, who commissioned artists such as Reinhold Max Eichler and Fritz Erler to decorate the new company headquarters built on Munich's Königinstraße in 1912-13. The Collection was geared to modern art, which from the outset has been successively expanded over the decades with works by important artists. It includes works by Rudolf Belling, Barbara Hepworth, Rupprecht Geiger ("Concave rounded", 1973), Norbert Kricke and Joseph Beuys.

Purchases for the Collection increased from the mid-1990s. The Walking Man by Jonathan Borofsky has stood outside a Munich Re building on Leopoldstraße since 1995 and has since become a symbol of Munich. Sculptures and installations from the Munich Re Art Collection by artists such as Olafur Eliasson ("Light Curtain", 2002) and Roxy Paine ("Discrepancy", 2011) are also found in the public spaces.

Artists like Angela Bulloch, Keith Sonnier and James Turrell have designed light installations for the extensive network of underground passages that link the company's buildings in Schwabing, Munich.

The Collection, which now comprises more than 3,000 works, is being constantly enlarged and is displayed in the company's Munich offices. Employees can also borrow art works from the Collection to display in their offices. In addition to internationally famous artists such as Jenny Holzer, Andy Hope 1930 and Wolfgang Tillmans, the Collection also acquires works by up-and-coming artists. The offices on Berliner Strasse, designed by the architectural practice of Sauerbruch Hutton, hold regularly changing exhibitions of contemporary art.

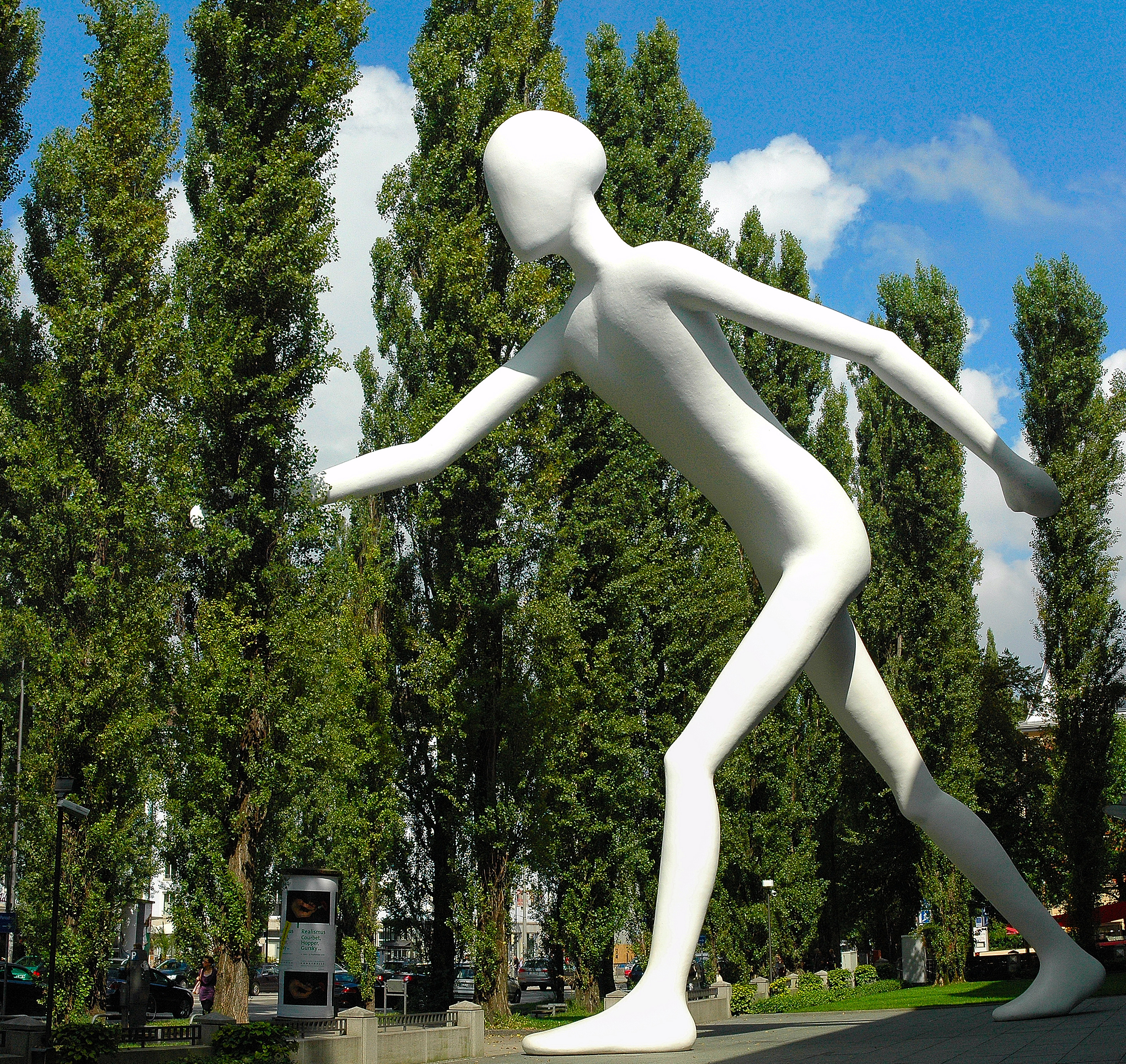
Jonathan Borofsky: Walking Man (1995)

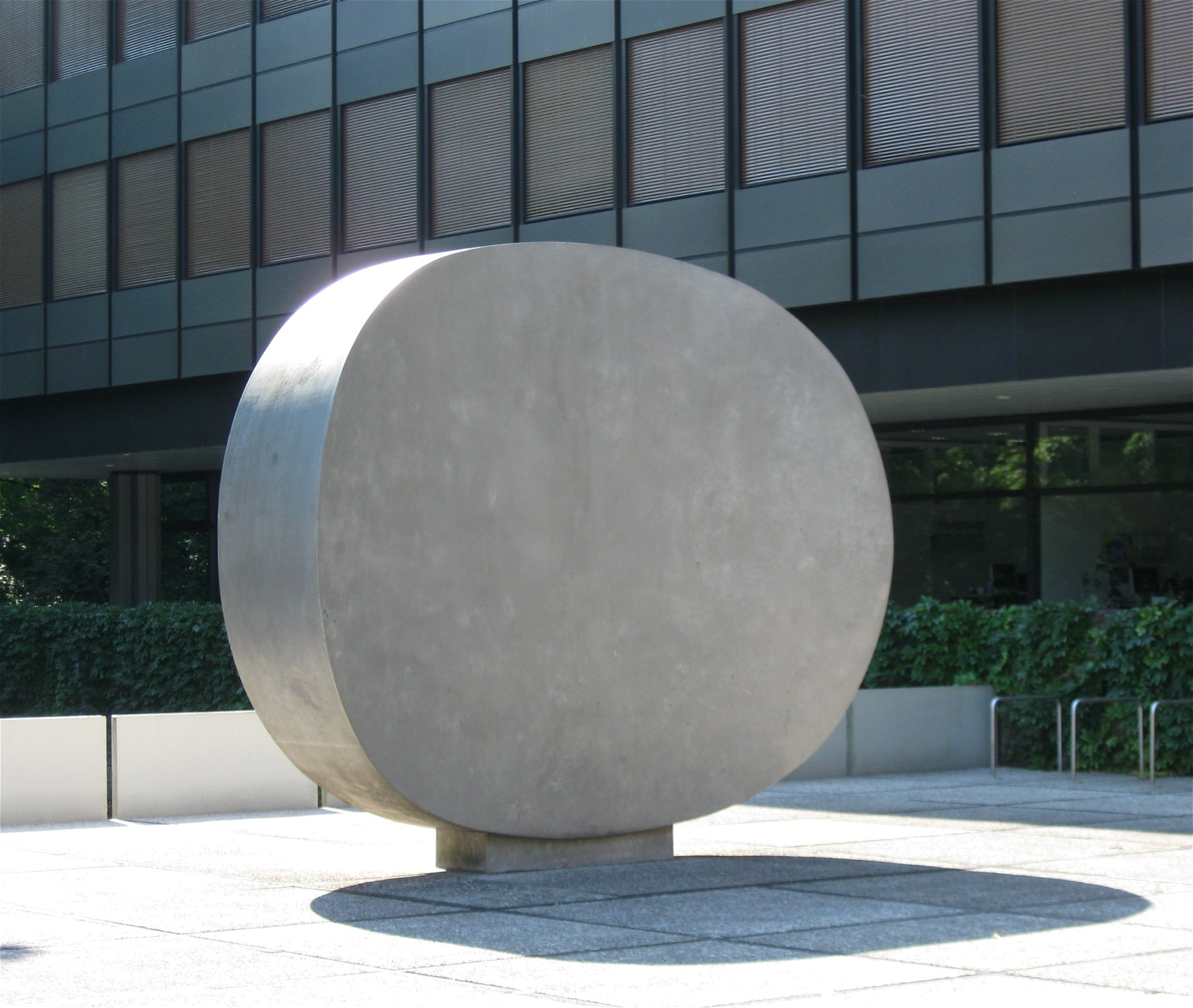
Rupprecht Geiger: Concave rounded (1973)

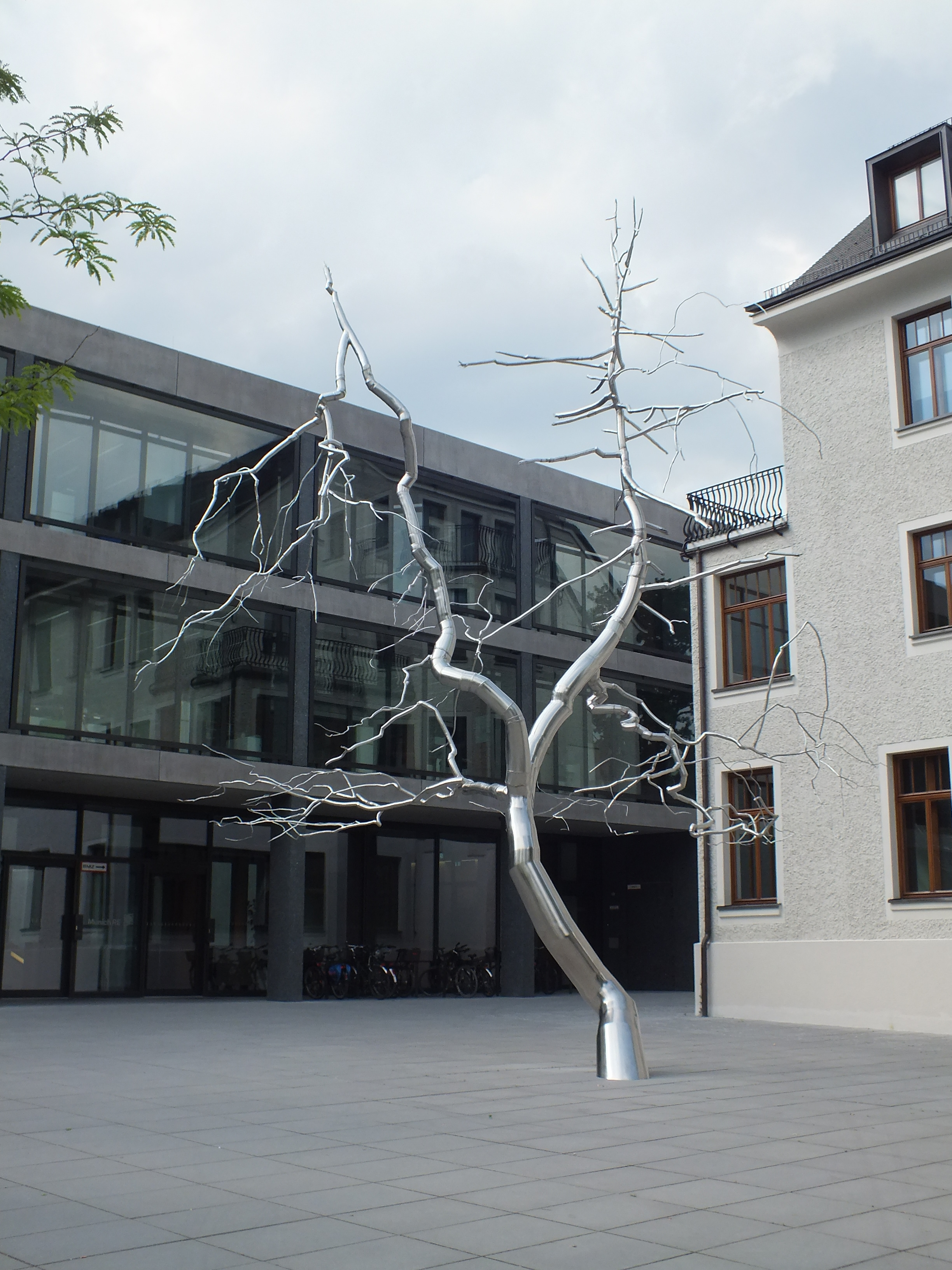
Roxy Paine: Discrepancy (2011)

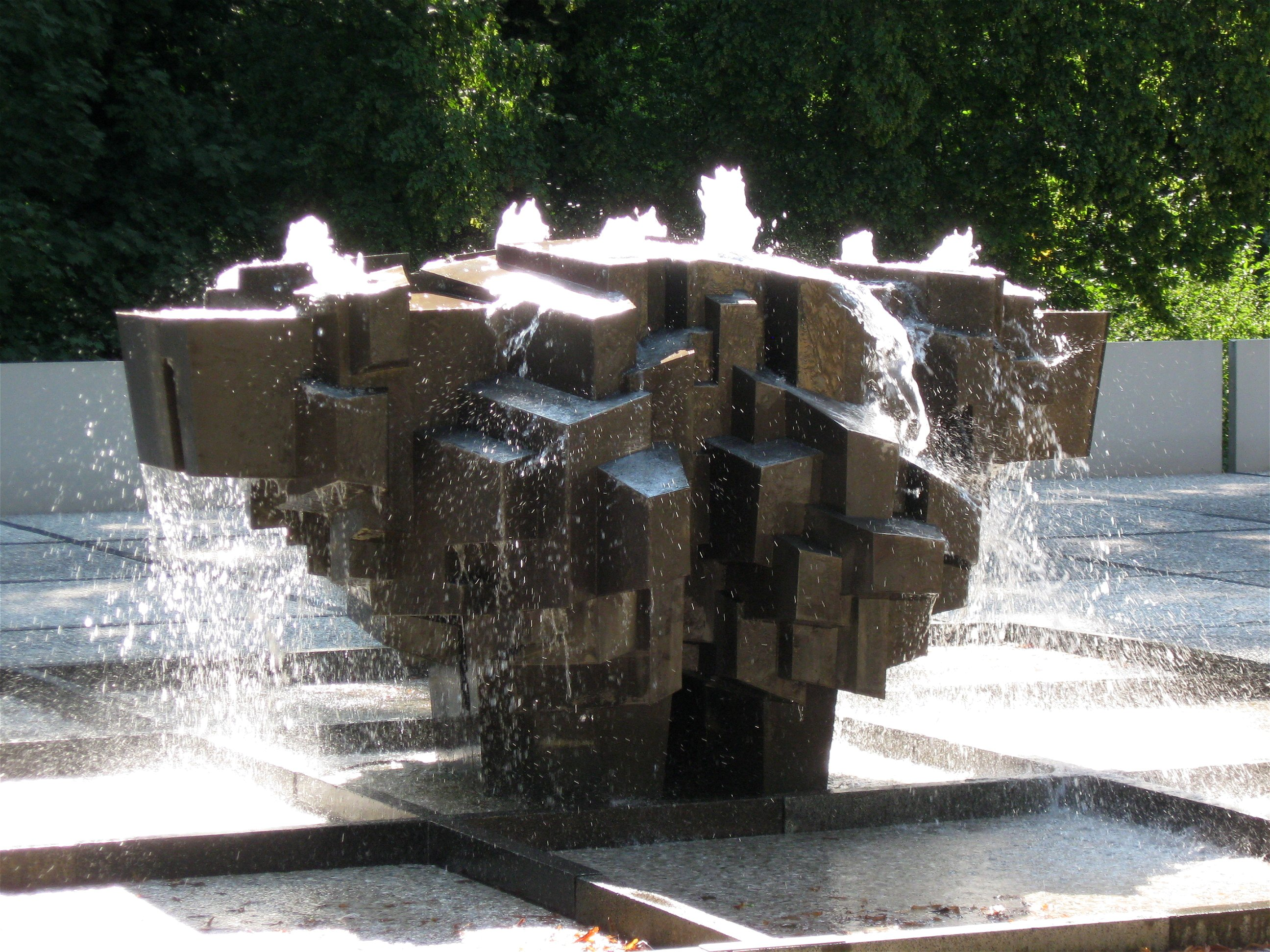
Georg Brenninger: Kristallbrunnen (1965)

== Investments ==
In October 2019, Munich Re invested $250 million in NEXT Insurance Inc. in a funding round that valued the small-business insurance provider at more than $1 billion.

In October 2022, Munich RE acquired the API Business Operations platform apinity from Allianz Group. The two parties did not disclose the amount.

In April 2026, MEAG, the asset manager of Munich Re, partnered with Warburg Pincus to invest in a platform focused on Europe’s defence and security sector. The initiative targets private equity investments in strategic industries amid rising defence spending across the region.
