= August von Finck Jr. =

German businessman (1930–2021)

- Born: 11 March 1930; Munich, Germany
- Died: 28 November 2021 (aged 91); London, England
- Occupation: Businessman
- Spouse: Francine von Finck
- Children: 4
- Parent: August von Finck Sr.

August von Finck Jr. (11 March 1930 – 28 November 2021) was a Swiss-based German billionaire businessman. When he died, his net worth was estimated at US$8.8 billion.

Von Finck Jr. supported political parties and initiatives in the right-wing and libertarian parties, groups and persons throughout his life.

== Early life ==
Von Finck was born in 1930 in Munich, the son of August von Finck Sr., and the grandson of Wilhelm von Finck, who started a private bank in 1870 that became Merck Finck & Co.

== Career ==
In February 2020, Von Finck sold the majority of his stake in Switzerland's SGS SA, one of the world's largest testing and inspection companies. He sold 960,000 shares valued at $2.4 billion.

According to Forbes, he had a net worth of US$8.8 billion when he died.

== Other interests ==
The German state government of Baden-Württemberg authorized the sale of an incunable about Medieval history to him in 2008. The price was about Euro 20 million.

== Supporter of Far-right party ==
Von Finck supported political parties and initiatives in the right-wing and libertarian milieu throughout his life.

In the 70s and 80s he supported Franz Josef Strauß (CSU). At the beginning of the 1990s he supported the first anti-euro party, the League of Free Citizens, with 4.3 million euros. He later financed the “Citizens' Convention” project around today's AfD politician Beatrix von Storch with a sum of millions.

Finck was a financial supporter of the German far right party AfD. An agent of the billionaire was apparently involved in the conception of the AfD-affiliated newspaper “Deutschland Kurier”.

== Personal life ==
Von Finck was married to Francine Le Tanneux von Saint Paul. They had four children and lived in Weinfelden Castle in Thurgau canton, Switzerland. His eldest son is August François von Finck.

He died on 28 November 2021, at the age of 91.
