= August von Finck Sr. =

German banker and member of Nazi Party (1898–1980)

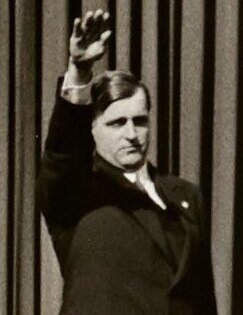
- Fink in 1935
- Born: July 18, 1898; Kochel am See, Germany
- Died: April 22, 1980 (aged 81); Grasbrunn, Germany
- Employer(s): Merck Finck & Co.
- Organization: Nazi Party
- Spouse(s): Margot von Rücker (1927-1942), Gerda Mau (1953-1980)
- Children: 5

August von Finck Sr. (18 July 1898 – 22 April 1980) was a German banker and businessman. He was the son of banker Wilhelm von Finck (1848–1924), founder of insurance giant Allianz and private bank Merck Finck & Co. Merck Finck & Co. served as Hitler's personal bank.

August von Finck was one of the most influential bankers of the Weimar Republic and Nazi Germany. He financed Hitler in the 1930s. He was described as the ‘richest and stingiest’ man in Bavaria.

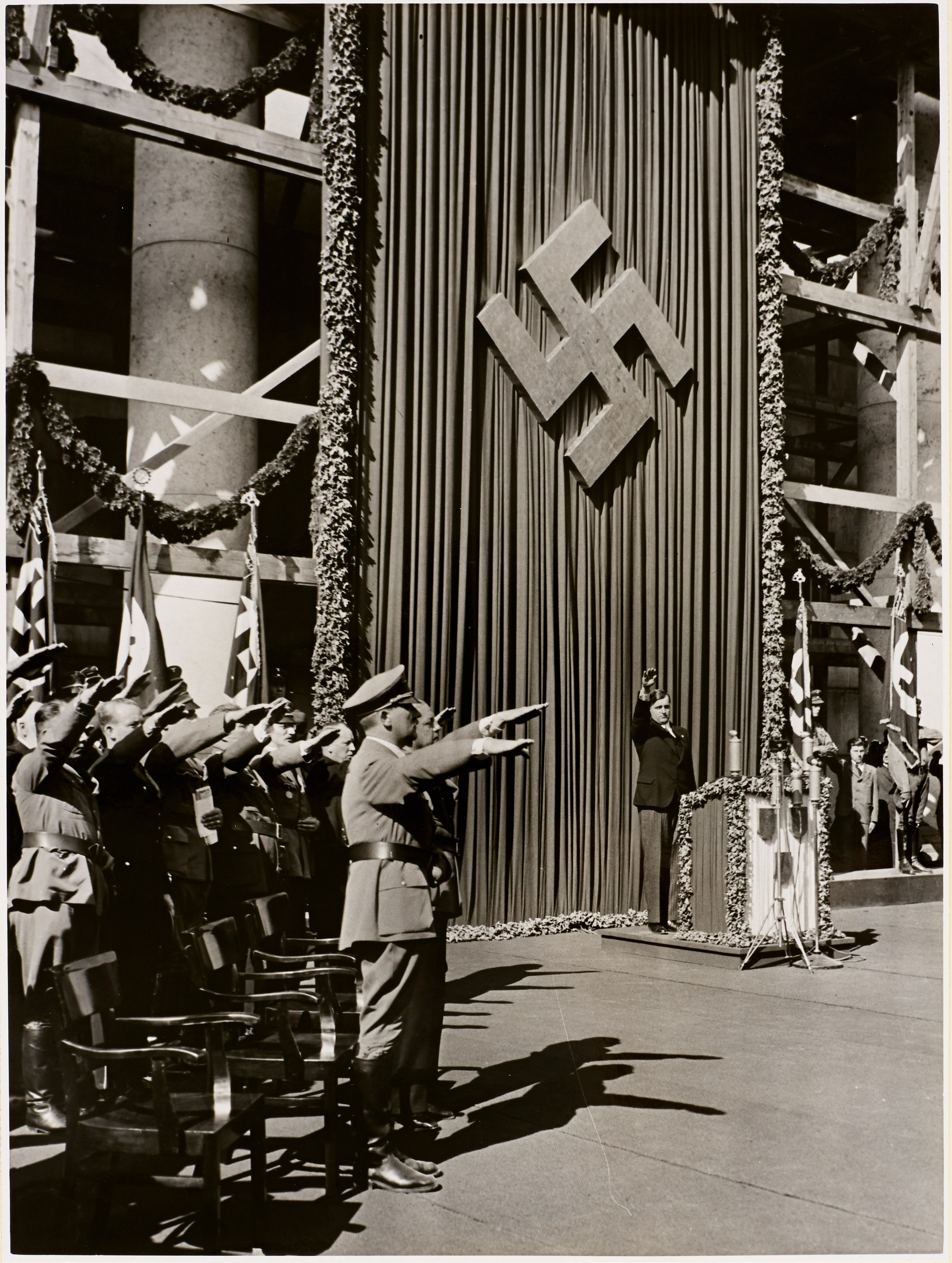
August von Finck, standing behind the lectern, performing the Nazi salute during the topping out ceremony of the Haus der Deutschen Kunst, 29 June 1935, in the presence of Adolf Hitler.

== Biography ==
August von Finck was born on 18 July 1898 in Kochel am See. He was born to Wilhelm von Finck (1848-1924) and Marie Fäustle (1865-1935). Von Finck had two sisters. His brother, Wilhelm von Finck Jr. (1893-1916), was killed in action during World War I. After his brother's death, von Finck was enrolled in 1916 and served in the German army in the Balkans for two years.

As per the wishes of his father, von Finck became principal partner at Merck Finck after his father's death in 1924. Von Finck also inherited his father's other business holdings and a large amount of land.

On February 3, 1931, Wilhelm von Finck, along with other industrialists, met Adolf Hitler for their first time at the Hotel Kaiserhof in Berlin. At this meeting, von Finck and Schmitt committed 5 million Reichsmark from Allianz to fund the SA in the event of a leftist uprising. The amount committed however, was never handed over to Hitler as the uprising never occurred.

In May 1933, von Finck became a member of the NSDAP. He helped raise funds to build Haus der Kunst museum, Hitler's pet project to house the artworks, and used his hunting lodge in the Upper Bavarian Alps to entertain Nazi bigshots like Gauleiter Adolf Wagner. Between 1933 and 1938, he benefited and called for the Aryanisation of Jewish property, and led the hostile overtaking of Jewish owned companies across Germany and annexed Austria including Jewish bank S. M. von Rothschild in Vienna which was sold to Merck, Finck & Co. at a very low price which allowed the latter to attain a commanding position in Europe's private bank industry. He also profited massively from war and Allianz flourished during the war through the successful cultivation of ties between the NSDAP and Finck.

In a letter to Chamber of Commerce in 1937, he wrote: “Today, the German private banking sector is still largely made up of non-Aryan firms. The gradual cleansing of this trade, which is strongly influenced by the Jewish element, must not be halted by the granting of applications for exemptions but must … be promoted by all means.”

In 1941 he was a member of the board of directors of the Grossbetschkereker Zuckerfabriks-Aktiengesellschaft, a sugar factory in Veliki Bečkerek (now Zrenjanin) in German occupied Serbia. He divorced his first wife, Margot von Rücker, in 1942. He became a member of the German advisory board for private banking in 1944.

After the end of World War II, von Finck withdrew temporarily and management was handed over to a trustee. He asserted that he was apolitical, even anti-Nazi, and submitted forty Persilschein to denazification court. Von Finck spent 500,000 deutsche marks to make sure that incriminating witnesses did not appear in court or alter what they had intended to say. He also threatened the prosecutor that he would reveal that he was gay. In 1948, he was classified as a “fellow traveler” of the Nazis and the court ordered him to pay 2,000 marks to a restitution fund. Von Finck, dissatisfied, appealed and was granted amnesty.

He was suspended from running a bank for five years. In 1951, he returned to his positions and took a conservative course in running the bank. He rebuilt Merck Finck & Co. after the war despite tremendous handicaps. He also started focusing on stopping a land reform.

He bought Weinfelden Castle from a Jewish family in 1972 for 340.000 Swiss francs and renovated it. Today the castle is inhabited by August von Finck jr.

August von Finck died 22 April 1980 in Möschenfeld, in the municipality of Grasbrunn.

== Descendants ==
August von Finck had five children:

With Margot von Rücker, his first wife:

- Wilhelm von Finck (1927–2003)
- August von Finck Jr. (1930–2021)
- Eleonore Grziwa, née von Finck (25 November 1931 – 7 June 2014)

With Dr. Gerda Mau, his second wife:

- Gerhard von Finck (born 1954)
- Helmut von Finck (born 1959)

== Sources ==
- De Jong, David (2022). Nazi Billionaires. William Collins. ISBN 978-0-00-829976-7.
