= Wilhelm von Finck =

German entrepreneur and banker (1848–1924)

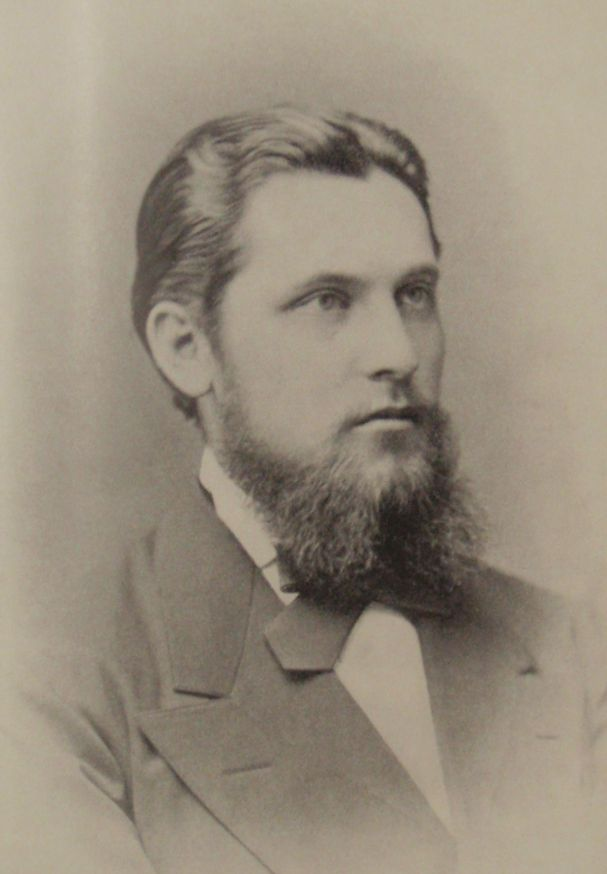
- Wilhelm Finck, around 1883
- Born: 6 February 1848; Bad Vilbel, Grand Duchy of Hesse, German Confederation
- Died: 4 April 1924 (aged 76); Munich, Germany
- Occupation: Businessman
- Spouse: Marie Fäustle (m. 1886)
- Children: 4

Wilhelm von Finck (6 February 1848 – 4 April 1924) was a German entrepreneur and banker. Finck was a co-founder of the German companies Allianz and Munich Re.

== Life ==
In Frankfurt am Main, he was a student at the Hasselsche Institut. He worked first for German company Bankhaus Philipp Nicolaus Schmidt. Since 1869 he worked for Nestle, Andreae & Co. in London and since 1870 for Merck Finck & Co. in Darmstadt. By 1879, together with his brother August Finck, who replaced the departing general Adolf Karl Ludwig Christian, the previous authorized representative Wilhelm von Finck already held a large part of the bank assets of Merck Finck & Co.

Together with German entrepreneur Theodor von Cramer-Klett and Carl von Thieme he founded company Munich Re in April 1880. German company Allianz was founded in Berlin on 5 February 1890 by then director of the Munich Reinsurance Company (Munich Re) Carl von Thieme (a native of Erfurt, whose father was the director of Thuringia) and Wilhelm von Finck.

== Personal life ==
In 1886, he married Marie Fäustle and they had four children. One of his children was German businessman August von Finck Sr. (1898-1980).

== Awards ==
- Merit Order of the Bavarian Crown

== Literature ==
- Bernhard Hoffmann: Wilhelm von Finck 1848-1924. Lebensbild eines deutschen Bankiers, Verlag Beck, München 1953.
- Bernhard Hoffmann: Finck, Wilhelm Peter von. In: Neue Deutsche Biographie (NDB). Band 5, Duncker & Humblot, Berlin 1961, ISBN 3-428-00186-9, p. 150 f. (Digitalisat).
- Genealogisches Handbuch des Adels, Adelslexikon Band III, Band 61 der Gesamtreihe, C. A. Starke Verlag, Limburg (Lahn) 1975, ISSN 0435-2408.
- Genealogisches Handbuch des in Bayern immatrikulierten Adels, Band XXV; 2004. 62, Vereinigung des Adels in Bayern. Verlag : Degener, ISBN 3-7686-5191-6
- Marita Krauss: Die Finks. Eine Dynastie der Hochfinanz zwischen Wirtschaft und Politik, in: Marita Krauss (Hrsg.): Die bayerischen Kommerzienräte - Eine deutsche Wirtschaftselite von 1880 bis 1928, Volk Verlag, München 2016, p. 258–264. ISBN 978-3-86222-216-2
