= Merck Finck Privatbankiers =

German private bank

Coordinates: 48.1410°N 11.5697°E

Merck Finck A Quintet Private Bank

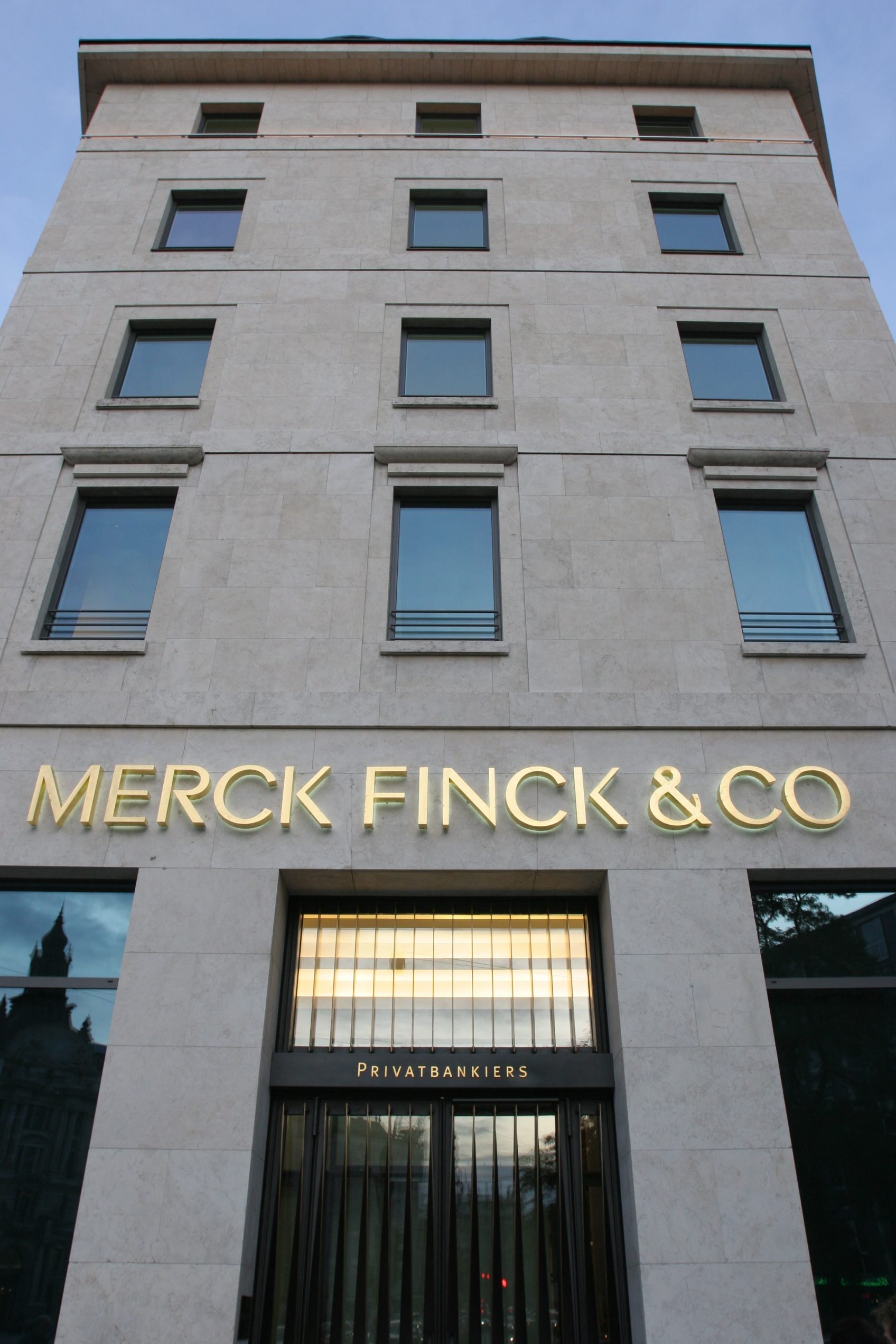
- Munich headquarter of Merck Finck in 2024
- Formerly: Merck, Christian & Co. Merck Finck & Co
- Type: Aktiengesellschaft
- Industry: Banking, Financial services
- Founded: July 1, 1870 in Munich, Kingdom of Bavaria
- Founders: Heinrich Johann Merck, Adolf Karl-Ludwig Christian
- Headquarters: Pacellistraße 16, Munich, Germany
- Number of locations: 10
- Area served: Germany
- Key people: Michael Savenay (CEO), Florian Kayl (COO)
- Products: corporate banking, investment banking, asset management, wealth management
- Owner: Quintet Private Bank
- Number of employees: 227 (May 2024)
- Website: www.merckfinck.de

The private bank Merck Finck A Quintet Private Bank, founded in 1870, is based in Munich and is also represented nationwide with a total of 10 locations. Since 2011, it has been a subsidiary of the Luxembourg bank KBL European Private Bankers (KBL), which was renamed Quintet Private Bank in January 2020.

== History ==
Merck Finck was founded under the company Merck, Christian & Co. on 1 July 1870 by Adolf Karl Ludwig Christian and banker Heinrich Johann Merck. Other limited partners were the Darmstater Bank forerunner of the Danatbank and the entrepreneur Theodor von Cramer-Klett. By 1879, together with his brother August, who replaced the departing general Christian, the previous authorized representative Wilhelm von Finck already held a large part of the bank assets. As part of these changes, the bank was renamed Merck, Finck & Co. The core business of the bank was corporate financing and issuing corporate bonds. The bank was involved in the founding of companies such as the Süddeutsche Bodencreditbank AG (1871), the brewery Bürgerliches Brauhaus München (1880), the Isarwerke GmbH (1894) and the Münchener Trambahn-AG. In 1890, Merck Finck subscribed for almost 40% of the share capital of Allianz Versicherungs-AG. As a representative of the bank, Wilhelm Finck often took on a supervisory board mandate with the shareholdings and thus brought his economic expertise to a wide variety of companies.

His work was honored in 1905 with the appointment to the Imperial Council of the Crown of Bavaria. This brought the family also the elevation to the hereditary peerage.

After the bank had developed positively in the deposit, lending and securities business at the turn of the century, the First World War interrupted the upswing. The capital market was heavily regulated. The period of inflation after the end of the war also prevented further expansion. Despite falling revenues, the bank was able to continue its operations without external help.

Another turning point was the death of Wilhelm von Finck in 1924. His share of the bank of nearly 100% was shared equally between his son August von Finck Sr. and his daughters Margarete von Stengel and Elisabeth Winterstein.

The death of William von Finck and the take over of the banking business by his son ushered in a new era. Merck Finck & Co. made a major contribution to the founding of aircraft construction and air traffic companies: with Udet-Flugzeugbau GmbH, a predecessor of today's DASA, and Süddeutsche Aero Lloyd AG, a predecessor to Lufthansa, important industry pioneers were created in Germany.

The global economic crisis imposed further restrictions on banking from 1929 onwards. Nevertheless, it was possible to participate in businesses like the Vereinigte Werkstätten für Kunst im Handwerk, the sparkling wine cellar J. Oppmann and the Gesellschaft für Markt und Kühlhallen in Hamburg.

Due to its owner's (August von Finck Sr.) close ties to Nazi regime, the bank took part in numerous hostile overtaking of Jewish owned companies all across Germany and annexed Austria. de:J. Dreyfus & Co. was one of many privately held companies forced to be sold to Hitler's entrepreneurs in the process of Aryanization.

After the annexation of Austria to the German Reich in 1938, Merck, Finck & Co. took the opportunity to acquire Wiener Privatbankhaus S. M. v. Rothschild. This highly renowned Austrian private bank, owned by Louis Nathaniel de Rothschild, had controlled the Österreichische Kreditanstalt until 1931. From July 1938 it was provisionally administered by Merck, Finck & Co.. In 1940 it was "made aryan" by the newly founded bank E. v. Nicolai in Vienna; here Merck, Finck & Co. was involved with 71% and the German industrial bank (Düsseldorf) with 19%. After the Second World War the remaining values were given back to Louis Nathaniel von Rothschild, but he renounced the rebuilding of the bank S. M. v. Rothschild.

After a period between state influence and free enterprise under the Nazi regime, the bank Merck, Finck & Co. was completely paralyzed in post-war times, not least because of the involvement of the owners and senior executives in Nazi economic policy. It was not until 1949 that Merck Finck & Co. was able to resume business operations in the newly constructed bank building. The bank was now heavily involved in the securities industry. Through this and the support of August von Finck Jr. and later Wilhelm Winterstein August von Finck senior managed to re-enter the banking market. In the following years, the bank expanded by founding new branches outside of Bavaria. Together with the family of steel industrialist Fritz von Waldthausen, the banking house Waldthausen & Co. was founded in 1954. Merck Finck & Co. took over the business of the banking house Alwin Steffan from Frankfurt am Main, to which it had longstanding connections, with the death of the senior partner in 1963.

Surprisingly August von Finck junior sold the bank for about DM 600 million to the British Barclays Bank Plc in October 1990. Due to tax reforms of the previous years undisclosed reserves that had been built up over generations were used up. In order to pay the taxes due, even parts of the over 100-year-old stock portfolio had been sold. The Barclays branches in Hamburg, Stuttgart and Berlin changed their name and became branches of Merck Finck & Co. However, as the broad retail banking of the new parent company was incompatible with private banking, which was firmly established in the bank, Barclays Bank sold Merck Finck in 1999 to KBL European Private Bankers (KBL epb), to which it has belonged ever since.

In 2002, Merck Finck acquired WestLB's German private banking unit. In 2005, the private banking business of Westfalenbank AG was acquired.

On 21 May 2010, the Indian investment company Hinduja Group announced that it would take over the KBL European Private Bankers division from the Belgian KBC Bank for €1.35 billion. However, on 16 March 2011 it became known that the Luxembourg financial regulator Commission de Surveillance du Secteur Financier (CSSF) refused to approve the sale. Thus, Merck Finck remained in the possession of the Belgian financial group KBC.

On October 10, 2011, it was announced that the Belgian KBC Group is selling its KBL European Private Bankers division for €1.05 billion to a Luxembourg holding called Precision Capital, which is backed by private individuals in Qatar. These belong to the family Al-Thani, which has shaped the political events of Qatar for about 200 years. The purchase was completed in July 2012. The Quintet Group also includes Brown Shipley & Co in the UK and InsingerGilissen in the Netherlands. On 1 September 2016, the private bank Merck Finck & Co changed its legal form, the Merck Finck & Co. oHG became Merck Finck Privatbankiers AG.

In January 2020, KBL European Private Bank changed its name to Quintet Private Bank and Merck Finck has since carried the addition "A Quintet Private Bank".

In December 2020, Merck Finck Privatbankiers AG was integrated into the parent company, the European Quintet Private Bank (Europe) S.A.

== Managing directors ==
- 1879–1924 Wilhelm von Finck
- 1924–1980 August von Finck Sr.
- 1980–1991 August von Finck Jr.
- 1991–1995 Wilhelm Winterstein
- 1995–2002 Gerd Schmitz-Morkramer
- 2002–2010 Alexander Mettenheimer
- 2010–2015 Michael Krume and Georg Freiherr von Boeselager
- 2015–2016 Michael Krume, Thilo H. Wendenburg, Georg Freiherr von Boeselager, Udo Kröger, Joachim Gorny
- 2016–2017 Michael Krume, Udo Kröger, Joachim Gorny
- since 2017 Matthias Schellenberg, Michael Krume
- since 2018 Matthias Schellenberg, Michael Krume, Olivier Kuetgens
- since June 2020 Thomas Rodermann, Olivier Kuetgens
- since December 2020: Michael Savenay, CEO Germany
- since March 2021: Reinhard Krafft, CEO Merck Finck
- since January 2023: Michael Savenay, CEO Merck Finck

== Operations ==
The main focus of business activity is the consulting and management of large assets with a private or entrepreneurial background.

The offer ranges from strategic asset planning and asset management to advice on asset and company succession, family office and foundation consultancy.

This Luxembourg parent Quintet Private Bank enables the bank to initiate and conduct cross-border transactions throughout the euro area.

The Quintet group owns private banks in Belgium, Denmark, Germany, United Kingdom, the Netherlands and the Grand Duchy of Luxembourg.

== Shareholders ==
Merck Finck is wholly owned by the European private banking group Quintet, which in turn is owned by private investors through the Precision Capital holding.

== Locations ==
The bank is represented at 10 locations throughout Germany. In addition to the parent company in Munich, private bankers are present in a broad network throughout the republic.

- 1870: Munich
- 1954: Düsseldorf
- 1963: Frankfurt am Main
- 1992: Hamburg, Stuttgart
- 2002: Cologne, Münster
- 2004: Grünwald
- 2006: Augsburg
- 2008: Essen

== Merck Finck Foundation ==
Merck Finck has created a foundation to engage with clients for selected promotional purposes. The aim of the foundation is to support society in Germany in the further development of important future fields. The focus is on these topics:

- Education and parenting
- Youth and elderly help
- Science and research
- Arts and culture
- Nature and environmental protection
- Public health service
- Monument protection and preservation of monuments

== Criticism ==
The weekly magazine Der Spiegel reported in May 2014 that the adviser for large winners of the Westdeutsche Lotterie has conspicuously often mediated winners of large sums of money to the bank in order to invest the money over the long term. The article argues that lottery winners have often received poor advice and that asset classes such as ship funds and open-ended real estate funds have often led to losses. Westlotto denies that the employee would have had financial benefits from the negotiations.

In April 2014, the bank was convicted in one case because of falsely advising lottery winners. A married couple had won more than €6 million from Westlotto and invested them with Merck Finck & Co. The bank persuaded the couple to invest in so-called closed-end funds, which turned out to be uncertain, so that the couple lost a large part of the lottery prize. The Landgericht Münster established a false counsel and sentenced the bank to pay €510,000 to the couple.

== See also ==
- List of banks in Germany
