= Seattle Convention Center =

Municipal convention center in Seattle, Washington

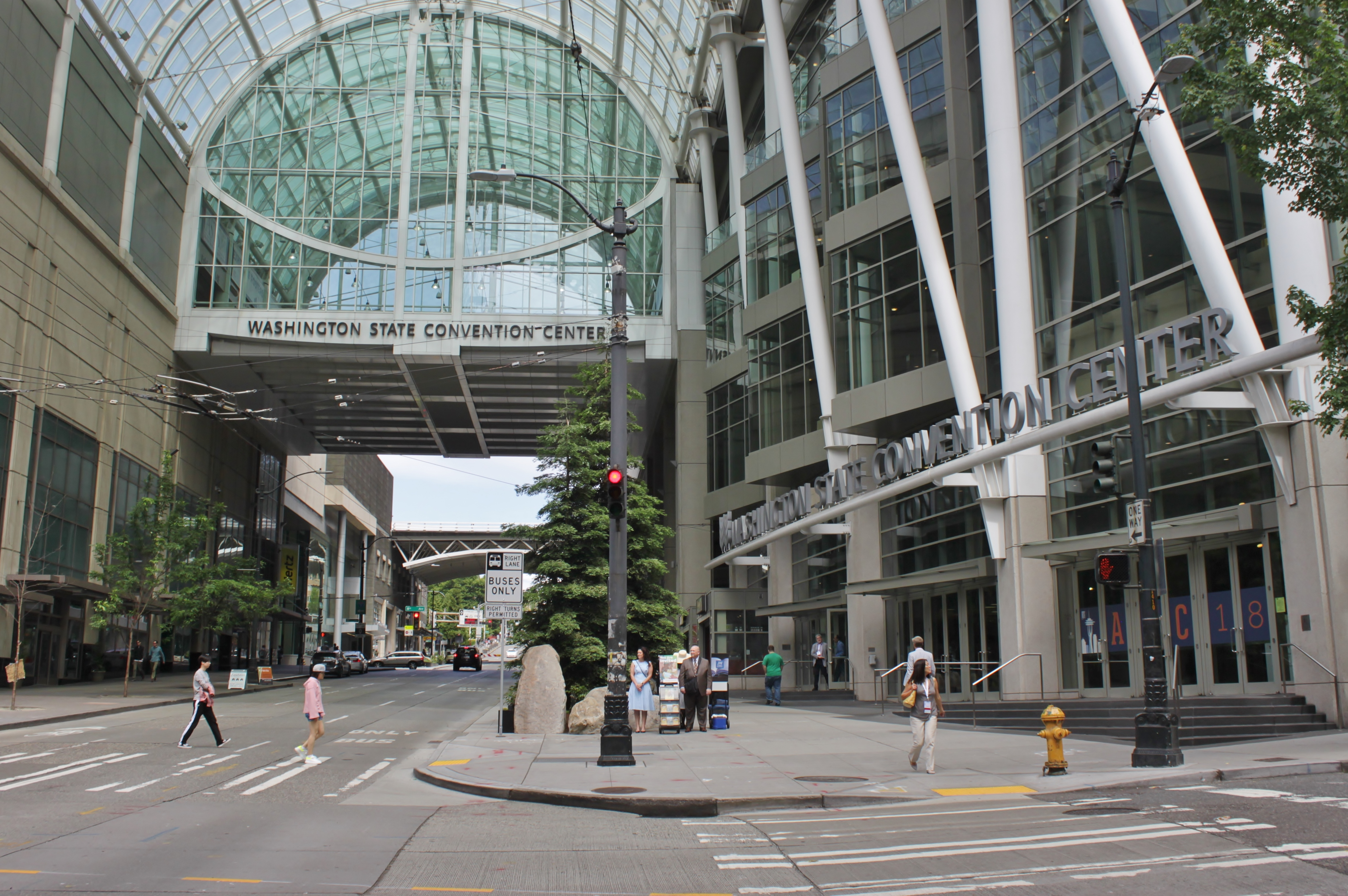
- The convention center's entrance and skybridge, seen from Pike Street and 7th Avenue
- Location of the convention center within Downtown Seattle
- Former names: Washington State Convention and Trade Center (1988–2010); Washington State Convention Center (2010–2022)
- Address: 705 Pike Street
- Location: Seattle, Washington, U.S.
- Coordinates: 47°36′43″N 122°19′53″W
- Owner: Washington State Convention Center Public Facilities District
- Public transit: Westlake
- Parking: 2,190 stalls

Convention use
- Total space: 1,004,370 square feet (93,309 m^{2})
- Exhibit hall floor: 454,150 square feet (42,192 m^{2})
- Breakout/meeting space: 193,312 square feet (17,959 m^{2})
- Ballroom space: 102,628 square feet (9,534 m^{2})

Construction
- Built: 1985–1988
- Opened: June 18, 1988
- Expanded: 1999–2001, 2018–2023

Website
- seattlecc.com

The Seattle Convention Center (SCC), formerly the Washington State Convention Center (WSCC), is a convention center in Seattle, Washington, United States. It consists of two buildings in Downtown Seattle with exhibition halls and meeting rooms: Arch along Pike Street and Summit on the north side of Pine Street. The former straddles Interstate 5 and connects with Freeway Park. The convention center was planned in the late 1970s and funded through $90 million in bonds issued by the state legislature.

Construction began in September 1985 after delays in securing private funding; the complex opened on June 18, 1988. A major expansion began in 1999 and was completed in 2001, doubling the amount of exhibition space. A hotel and office tower were added, along with connections to the existing facility via a skybridge over Pike Street. At the site of the Convention Place transit station, located a block north of the original convention center, a second major expansion began in 2018 and opened in January 2023. The entire facility was renamed to the Seattle Convention Center in 2022, with the first two buildings named "Arch" and the second expansion named "Summit".

The convention center's largest annual events include PAX West (formerly the Penny Arcade Expo), Emerald City Comic Con, Sakura-Con, and the Northwest Flower and Garden Show. In 2025, Arch and Summit served more than 475,000 total attendees at events. The convention center complex has approximately 1 million square feet (93,000 m^{2}) of usable space, including exhibition halls with more than 450,000 square feet (42,000 m^{2}) in total space. It is located near several hotels and a major retailing center, as well as the Westlake transit station and a public parking garage.

== History ==
=== Background and early proposals ===
In the early 20th century, conventions and trade shows in Seattle were traditionally hosted by arenas, hotels, ballrooms, department stores, and theaters. The Exhibition Hall at the Seattle Center was built to showcase fine art at the 1962 World's Fair. It re-opened the following year for conventions, trade shows, banquets, and other events. The city hosted its largest-ever convention, a week-long meeting of the Shriners, late June and early July 1969 at the Seattle Center Coliseum and around the Seattle Center grounds.

The state government proposed a dedicated convention and trade center complex in the early 1970s as a form of economic stimulus following the "Boeing bust". The City of Seattle proposed to site the convention center at the Seattle Center, funding it with $10 million (equivalent to $63.9 million in 2025 dollars) in Forward Thrust grants allocated towards a planned multipurpose stadium. The University of Washington, a major downtown landowner, and the city government considered another plan to renovate or replace the Olympic Hotel with a modern convention-and-hotel facility in 1974. The following year, Mayor Wes Uhlman formed a task force to study potential locations for a convention center. These included the Seattle Center and nearby Metro Transit bus base on Mercer Street. King County Executive John Spellman recommended use of the near-complete Kingdome multipurpose stadium for large conventions. The city government hired a consulting team in 1975 to determine the feasibility of a large convention center, paid for by urban development funds from the federal government. The feasibility study, completed in 1977, recommended a facility with 70,000–90,000 square feet (6,500–8,400 m^{2}) of meeting space and 40,000–60,000 square feet (3,700–5,600 m^{2}) of exhibition space to host conventions of up to 7,000 attendees. Construction would require $47 million of state and county funds (equivalent to $195 million in 2025 dollars), at one of four sites: the Metro Transit bus base, the Nile Temple near the Seattle Center, on 6th Avenue near University Street, and near Stewart Avenue and 5th Avenue. The feasibility study estimated the convention center could generate $22 million in annual revenue and spur $50 million in associated private development.

The following year, the Seattle Chamber of Commerce formed a community task force representing government agencies and business groups to explore the remaining site options and submit a funding proposal to the state legislature. The task force, together with Mayor Charles Royer, announced their recommendation of the Metro Transit bus base site in December 1978, rejecting a plan from city-hired consultants and deciding instead to side with the business community. The city and chamber of commerce began formally lobbying the state legislature to approve $64.2 million (equivalent to $248 million in 2025 dollars) in 30-year general obligation bonds issued by the state, and a hotel-motel tax increase to pay for the project, which was dubbed the Washington State Convention and Trade Center. The state legislature considered the financing plan in February 1979, with Governor Dixy Lee Ray taking a neutral stance on state funding despite her support of the project. However, the bill was introduced too late in the legislative session to pass out of committee and was delayed to the next year. A citizen initiative restricting the city's ability to fund tourist activities, including the convention center, filed and placed on the November 1979 ballot by anti-tax activists. It was defeated by voters, but the campaign introduced public doubts about the project.

=== State approval and location planning ===
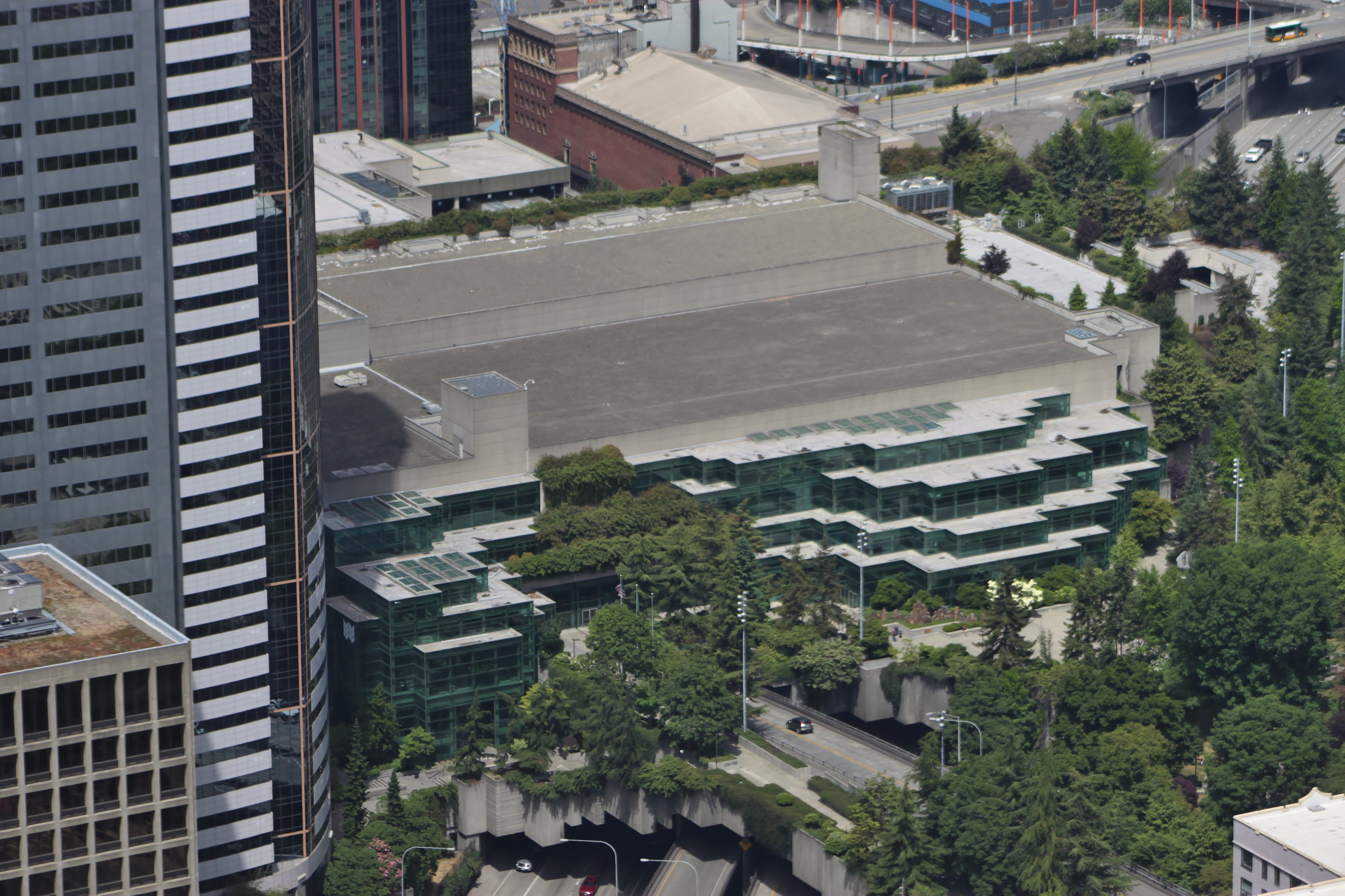
The original convention center, as built over Interstate 5, seen from the south

The state legislature formed a special committee in early 1981 to study the convention center proposal and a separate bipartisan commission to review its economic feasibility. During the city's push for a bill in the state legislature, a group of Bellevue businessmen planning to build their own convention center questioned the use of the county's taxes to support the Seattle-based convention center while ignoring the needs of the Eastside. The Bellevue group threatened to take the dispute to the state legislature, where support for the Seattle convention center was waning. Instead, a compromise was reached to tax hotels in Seattle and Bellevue at different rates. The special committee evaluated a new set of proposed sites for the convention center, including the north side of the Kingdome. However, a design spanning Interstate 5 near Freeway Park was unanimously recommended in December. The freeway site was more difficult to construct and cost $25 million more than the proposed Kingdome and Metro Transit sites but was closer to downtown hotels and retailers.

The Select Committee on Feasibility of a State Trade and Convention Center wrote a bill in late 1981 providing $99 million (equivalent to $296 million in 2025 dollars) in issued bonds for the convention center project paid with a countywide hotel-motel tax. It was read during the 1982 legislative session and passed by both houses during the regular session before being signed by Governor Spellman on March 13, 1982. The bill included provisions for other cities to use a similar hotel-motel tax for their convention centers. It faced some opposition because of the state's worsening debt problems, which could prevent it from repaying the bonds if the hotel-motel tax failed to fully cover construction cost. Some of the lawmakers who supported the bill also doubted that the project could be fully funded due to the saturated bond market and high interest rates at the time. During the initial bond sale in January 1983, the state sold $92.75 million (equivalent to $252 million in 2025 dollars) in general obligation bonds at 8.85 percent interest.

In June 1982, the state legislature established a public nonprofit corporation to manage construction and operations of the convention center. Governor Spellman appointed the corporation's board of directors which included banker James Cairns Jr. as chair, civic activist Jim Ellis, former councilwoman Phyllis Lamphere, and business leaders from Seattle and the Eastside. The appointed board was tasked with selecting a site for the convention center, with hopes of opening the facility by 1986. Public support for the project remained high because of a local recession. The project's location and public amenities, however, were the subject of a major debate that spanned several months of public hearings and city council meetings. TRA Architects were named as the head of a joint venture design team in September 1982. They unveiled preliminary designs for the convention center in February 1983 based on three finalist sites and a general size of 300,000 square feet (28,000 m^{2}). The freeway site, supported by downtown businesses and authorized by the state legislature, would span Interstate 5 between Freeway Park and Pike Street. It would include landscaped terraces and private development using the freeway's air rights, leased from the Washington State Department of Transportation. The Seattle Center site, supported by the city government, would replace the Metro Transit bus base and part of Memorial Stadium. The stadium part would be traded by the Seattle School District for the Metro Transit bus base. Some of the design options for the Seattle Center site included integrated bus facilities for Metro Transit in a lower level garage as well as a spur of the monorail serving the facility's top floor. The Kingdome site, deemed the one "left behind" in the "two-horse race" between the freeway and Seattle Center proposals, would replace the north parking lot and be adjacent to King Street Station. A pedestrian bridge would cross over the tracks to reach 4th Avenue South. A report prepared by a consultant hired by the convention center board favored the freeway site for its marketability. However, it found that the Kingdome and Seattle Center sites would be easily expandable and would have a lower operating cost due to shared equipment. The report also raised concerns about the potential loss of low-income housing concentrated on First Hill and the potential increase in noise and air pollution for the neighborhood. A separate report by the city concluded the freeway site would hurt operating revenue from parking at the Seattle Center. It also criticized the consultant's report for its lack of information and cost data.

In early March, various groups announced their support for the two front-runner sites at the freeway and Seattle Center ahead of a potential decision by the convention center board scheduled for March 31. Downtown business groups, including the Greater Seattle Chamber of Commerce, as well as tourism groups, downtown retailers, and hotel owners supported the freeway site. The Seattle Center site received the support of mayor Charles Royer, the city council, who voted 8–1 in favor of it, and several unions and tenants groups. The design of the freeway concept was later modified at the urging of First Hill neighborhood groups to include low-income housing to replace lost units. On March 31, 1983, the convention center board of directors voted 8–1 in favor of the freeway site. Several boardmembers cited its potential as a catalyst for a downtown revival that outweighed the higher cost and complexity. The city government responded by pledging to cooperate on design and permitting of the convention center project while continuing work on potential enhancements to the Seattle Center and Memorial Stadium. The state legislature authorized construction and further design of the convention center project during a special session in late May. The legislature also reduced the project's annual operating budget and rejected a proposed $6 million (equivalent to $16.3 million in 2025 dollars) issue of bonds.

=== Design, environmental review, and financing troubles ===
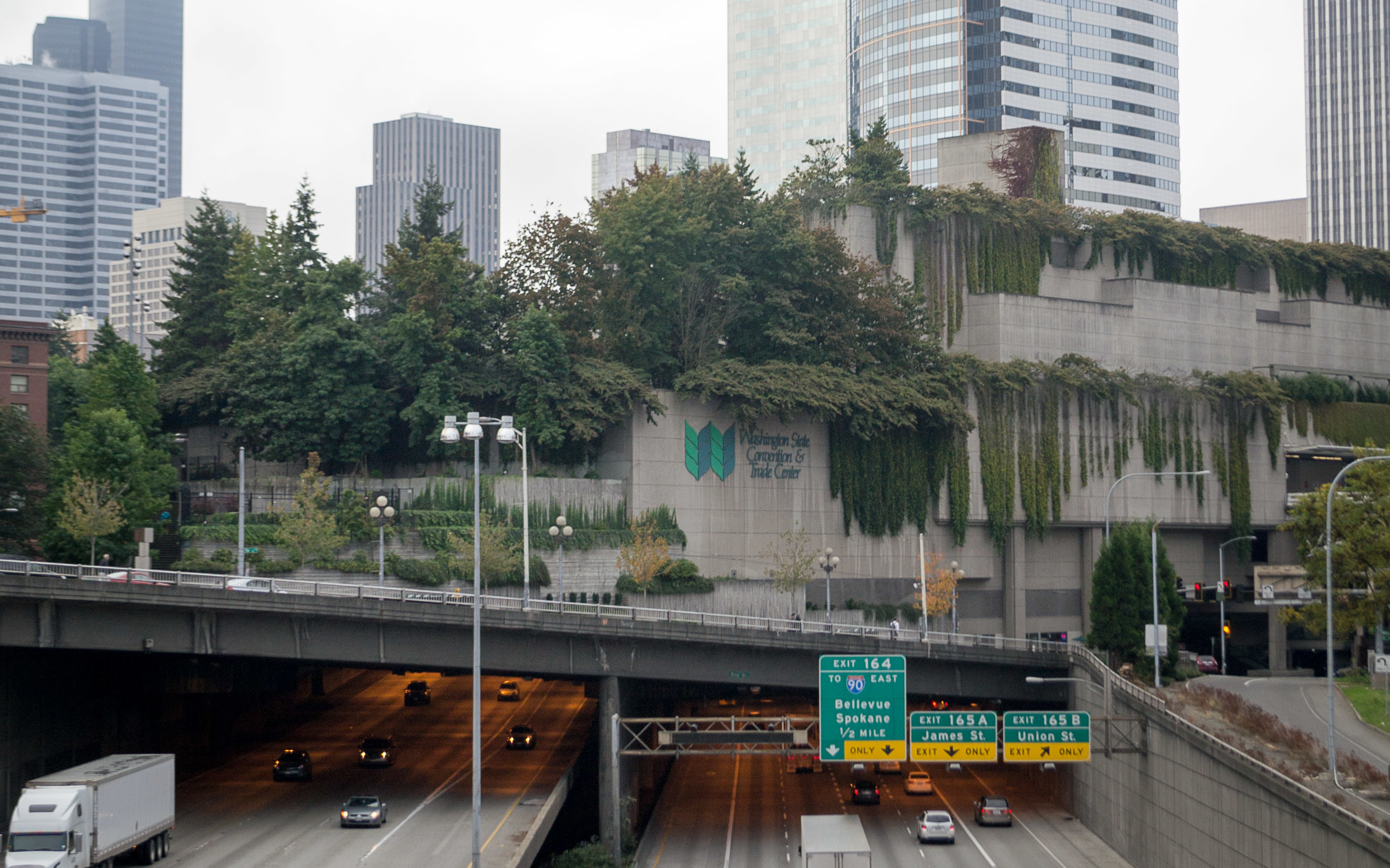
North view of the convention center, built on the airspace above Interstate 5

TRA Architects and engineering firm HNTB, with input from landscape designer Angela Danadjieva, unveiled an updated design concept for the convention center in July. The convention center complex would include 140,000 square feet (13,000 m^{2}) of exhibition space and a three-story glass enclosure facing Freeway Park and the retained 8th Avenue overpass. Air space around the center would be sold for private development. The facility would be designed for "middle of the market" conventions and trade shows, with 10,000 to 20,000 attendees, and include adaptable space for infrequent large events. Metro chose a site two blocks north of the convention center for the northernmost station of the downtown transit tunnel set to open shortly after the convention center. The convention center board signed an agreement with CHG International to develop the facility and manage private air rights above the freeway and adjacent to the building. In exchange, CHG would provide public parking and benefits, in addition to funding $30 million (equivalent to $81.4 million in 2025 dollars) of the construction costs. The project moved into final design and environmental review after the signing of the CHG agreement. An additional signed agreement with the Washington State Department of Transportation spelled finalized a 66-year lease for the air rights above the freeway. A group of First Hill residents formed a citizens' group to oppose the freeway site's design, fearing its impact on fixed-income residents of the neighborhood. The group announced plans in July 1983 to file a lawsuit to halt further planning. In response to displacement concerns from First Hill, the convention center's private development site was shifted to the west side of Interstate 5. The group later lobbied state legislators to overrule the convention center board's decision to put the renovation of low-income units in the Eagles Auditorium Building on hold.

The draft environmental impact statement, published in November and amended in February 1984, recommended the state government choose the freeway site, and fund promotion and marketing for the new facility. The convention center board of directors unanimously adopted the final environmental impact statement, including the freeway site, on March 26, 1984. It included a 40 percent enlargement of Freeway Park and agreements with the managers of nearby buildings to integrate stairways and open space into the new facility. The project moved to city council for approval, along with a CHG proposal to build two 40-story hotel and office towers over the convention center before the city's new zoning restrictions were to take effect. Ahead of a city council hearing on land-use restrictions and zoning for the convention center project, the city hearing examiner proposed that CHG build or fund $1.5 million (equivalent to $3.93 million in 2025 dollars) in low-income housing. This would offset potential displacement caused by the construction of the convention center and the proposed tower complex. The city council's urban redevelopment committee endorsed the hearing examiner's funding idea for review by the full council in their decision to grant permits for the project. The city council approved a zoning amendment and street vacation for the project and a compromise proposal with CHG to replace and rebuild 115 units of low-income housing near the convention center and contribute to a displacement mitigation fund.

In early December, CHG filed for a bankruptcy petition to obtain new financing amid turmoil at its primary lender, Westside Federal Savings and Loan, who was also a signatory to the convention center agreement in September 1983. To avoid reaching Westside's single-borrower lending limit and furthering complicating the project's funding arrangement, CHG had deeded its parcels to the bank prior to filing for bankruptcy. The convention center board began searching for a new development partner. Local firms were reluctant to accept the project because of its instability and risk, but national firms expressed some interest. Westside assumed control of CHG's $30 million share of private development and began its own search for outside lending and assistance while dealing with a $10.2 million loss. The convention center project was further complicated by President Ronald Reagan's import quotas on foreign-made steel that went into effect in January 1985. This increased prices for the 18,000 short tons (16,000 t) required for the facility by $5 million to $120 million (equivalent to $305 million in 2025 dollars).

The convention center board submitted a proposal to the state legislature asking to sell the remaining $6.25 million in bonds from the original $90 million package. The House and Senate approved the bill in April, with provisions to relax financial restrictions on the organization. Westside, meanwhile, received a pledge for a $40 million loan from Rainier National Bank and 11 other lenders in Washington state. The financing plan had been delayed long enough to push back the start of construction past the state's June deadline. This delay, and the attention given to the project's issues, caused four major conventions to cancel their early reservations. There had been 30 firm bookings and 79 tentative bookings.

Bidding on the convention center project was opened in April and split into thirteen packages; the initial bids for three of the packages were 10 percent higher than estimated, forcing the re-opening of bids and a three-month delay in construction. To reduce construction costs, the convention center board considered design changes that were opposed by Mayor Royer. He feared that cutbacks could create an "eyesore" similar to the bare-bones Kingdome. The convention center board proceeded with the design changes, at the urging of financial consultants. They cut $15.8 million by using leased equipment, rearranging interiors, and eliminating a proposed rooftop park. As part of earlier financial negotiations, the city government excluded the convention center from paying a $1.1 million contribution to the low-income housing fund, citing the project's favorable impact on the job market. The second round of bidding in late July brought a low bid of $92.5 million. This allowed for some of the design changes to be reverted or deferred with preparations during the initial phase of construction.

The $42 million (equivalent to $107 million in 2025 dollars) loan and financing agreement for the private portion of the convention center project was announced in late July. It was scheduled to be signed in August, but last-minute concerns from the Federal Home Loan Bank of Seattle, charged with supervision of Westside, led to a breakdown in negotiations. By the end of the month, Westside's stock had fallen as the bank announced a deficit of $29.5 million. Further, the bank needed additional assistance from the Federal Home Loan Bank to continue their commitment in the convention center project. On August 30, the bank collapsed and was taken over by the Federal Savings and Loan Insurance Corporation (FSLIC). This left the private financing unclear days before the agreement was set to expire. Negotiations between the convention center board, the state government, FSLIC, and Industrial Indemnity (a subsidiary of Xerox and primary insurers of Westside's loan) continued until a comprehensive financing agreement was reached on November 4, 1985. The agreement transferred Westside's property holdings to the convention center board for $5 million. It also reduced Industrial Indemnity's financial stake to $12 million, and appropriated $3.5 million to FSLIC after the planned sale of the McKay Hotel. The state government agreed to buy the rest of the convention center property for $8.5 million (equivalent to $21.6 million in 2025 dollars).

=== Construction and early years ===
Despite the ongoing negotiations to secure private financing, Paschen Contractors was awarded the project's $97.6 million construction contract on August 27, 1985; demolition work on the site began on September 17. A ceremonial groundbreaking was held on September 19 featuring speeches by Governor Booth Gardner and Mayor Royer. During construction, sections of Interstate 5 were closed or narrowed during nights and weekends, along with long-term closures of various ramps and the 8th Avenue overpass.

Construction of the building's foundation began in January 1986 followed by work on the basement level and 30 concrete columns in the median of Interstate 5. The contractor halted work for a week in June after a portion of the project's liability insurance coverage expired and a new insurer was sought. Construction resumed in time for the state department of transportation's July deadline for the start of steel erection. The erection of 22 steel trusses over Interstate 5 began in late July and was completed by November, while the final steel beam was installed in May 1987. The project used 19,500 short tons (17,700 t) of steel—more than that of the 76-story Columbia Center— lifted into place by a 450-short-ton (410 t) crane. Steelwork fell behind schedule in late August because of a shortage in imported Taiwanese steel pieces that were seized by federal inspectors to investigate and validate its origin. The steel pieces were delivered and installed in autumn 1986, but were found to have cracked joints in need of repair.

The final piece of the project's private financing was secured in September 1986. Contractors Paschen and Tishman Midwest signed a tentative $42.5 million agreement to purchase and renovate the Eagles and McKay buildings for use as low-income housing. Governor Gardner proposed an additional round of state bonds in place of the Paschen–Tishman agreement to retain state control of the project, at a cost of $49.4 million. In March 1988, the state legislature approved a $58 million bond package to complete construction of the convention center and buy and renovate the nearby Eagles Building.

The Washington State Convention and Trade Center hosted its first event, a 1,400-member conference for professional meeting and convention planners, on June 18, 1988. It was formally dedicated by Governor Gardner, Mayor Royer, and County Executive Tim Hill on June 23, hosting 4,000 guests. Self-guided public tours were offered in the following weeks while preparations began for a series of large conferences and events at the new facility. The facility opened with 152,000 square feet (14,100 m^{2}) of usable space, including 102,000 square feet (9,500 m^{2}) for exhibitions and 50,000 square feet (4,600 m^{2}), making it the 20th largest in the United States. It cost $186 million (equivalent to $436 million in 2025 dollars) to construct the convention center complex, including $150 million in public funding and $34 million from private contributions and investments. Seattle's convention center opened within a few years of competing facilities in Vancouver and Portland, Oregon, the result of increased demand for conventions in the Pacific Northwest.

At the time of its opening and formal christening in September 1988, the convention center had 103 reservations extending to 1996 and was actively seeking bookings from international conferences. By its second full year of operation, the convention center was booking 80 events annually and attracting 375,000 attendees; its largest event was a national convention of Alcoholics Anonymous in July 1990, which drew 48,000 attendees. A minor expansion was completed in July 1991, adding new banquet and meeting rooms and restoring elements of the project cut during earlier design revisions. As part of the convention center's development agreement, it renovated the historic Eagles Auditorium Building at a cost of $30 million. The center sold it to A Contemporary Theatre for use as a downtown theater, which opened in 1996. The McKay Apartments building, also part of the development agreement, was demolished in 1990 after sitting vacant for three years.

=== First major expansion ===
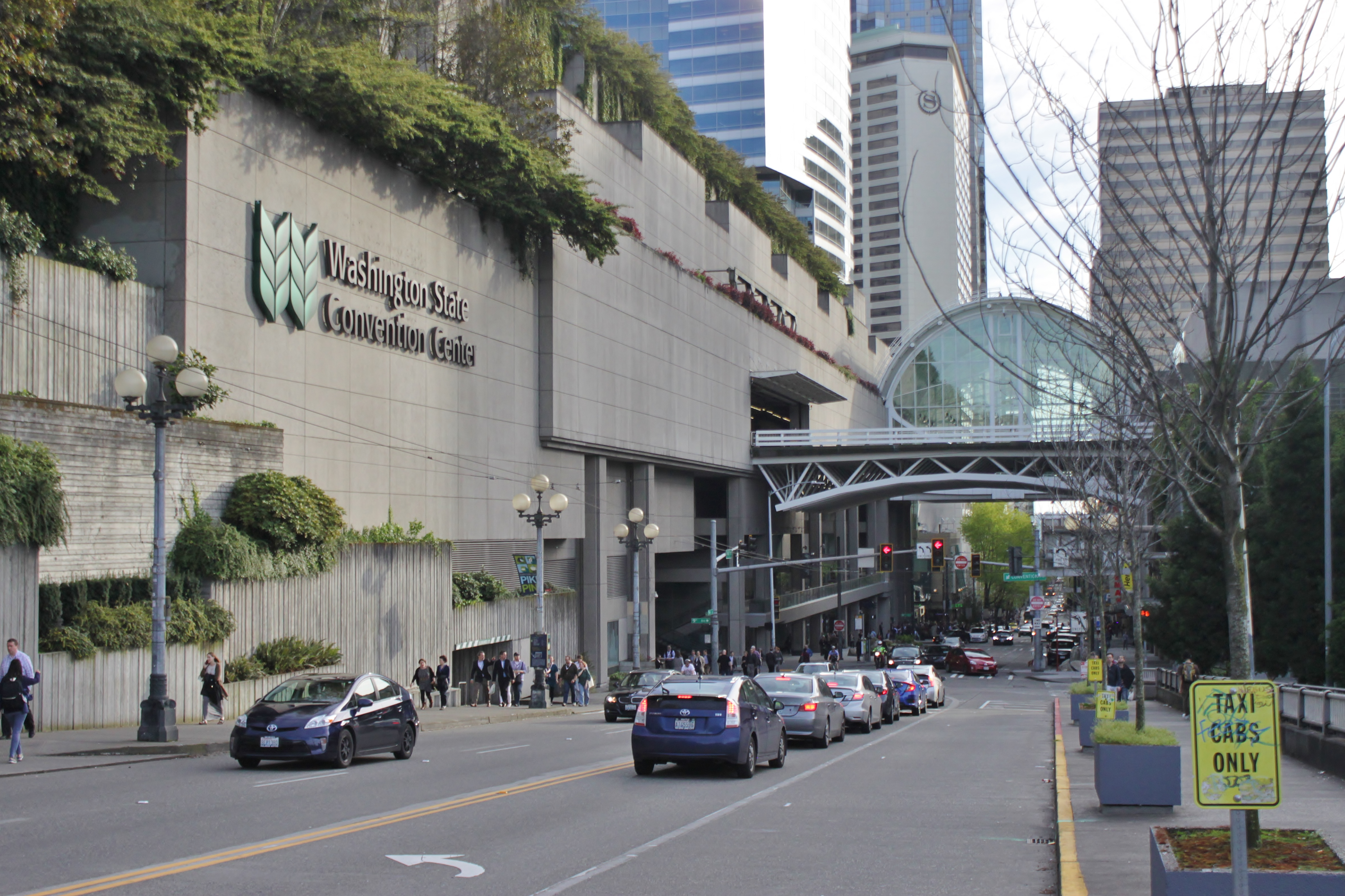
View of the skybridge, built during the 2001 expansion, from Pike Street

The convention center's success during its first five years of operations was credited with revitalizing Downtown Seattle and its retail core. At the behest of the Nordstrom family and other downtown business groups, planning began for an expansion of exhibition and meeting space to host additional events. Preliminary plans for the expansion were unveiled in January 1994. They proposed a six-story building on the north side of Pike Street that was envisioned in the original designs for the facility. The $190 million project would add 144,000 square feet (13,400 m^{2}) of exhibition space and include space for a new central branch of the Seattle Public Library system.

The state legislature initially rejected the expansion's $15 million property-and-study appropriation. Instead, it formed a committee to determine market demand and the economic feasibility of an expansion. The expansion plan was endorsed by city council in late 1994, with the promise of protecting existing low-income housing in exchange for financial support. The proposal returned to the state legislature during the 1995 session. A state contribution of $111.7 million was authorized for construction, provided private or local funding was secured beforehand. In October 1996, the convention center board chose a two-block site on the north side of Pike Street over a proposed site on First Hill. They offered to build 772 low-income housing units to replace similar units that would be demolished for the project. The convention center board selected two private co-developers to build a hotel and office tower as part of the expansion: R.C. Hedreen would lead the convention center portion and build a separate 30-story hotel and parking garage for $145 million; Trammell Crow would develop a $70 million, 16-story office building at Pike Street and 7th Avenue.

A key element of the expansion project was an arched glass canopy and skybridge over Pike Street between the two halves of the convention center, connecting at the fourth floor. Residents and city council members criticized the skybridge as an eyesore that would block views of Elliott Bay from Capitol Hill. Its design was ultimately given preliminary approval by the city council in August 1998, along with land use permits as part of the final approvals for the project. Dissenting city council members re-opened the debate on the skybridge during consideration of a proposed street vacation, but the city council approved the design again in April 1999 to prevent a costly last-minute redesign.

Construction on the $205 million (equivalent to $372 million in 2025 dollars) expansion began on May 19, 1999, under the direction of contractor Kiewit Construction. The last steel truss was placed in late December and work on the skybridge and canopy began the following spring. The expanded convention center opened to the public on July 14, 2001. With the expansion, the total exhibition space doubled to 205,700 square feet (19,110 m^{2}) making the facility the 28th largest in the United States. The inaugural event at the expanded facility was the Seattle Gift Show in August 2001. The Seattle Public Library used a portion of the expansion's office space as a temporary branch during construction of the new central branch from July 2001 to May 2004. The space was originally planned to be used by the Museum of History and Industry after 2004. The museum decided to instead renovate the Naval Reserve Armory on Lake Union into its new home in 2012. The space was transferred back to the WSCC and converted into a four-story business conferencing center, which opened in July 2010. That same year, the convention center was re-branded as the Washington State Convention Center, dropping the word "trade". The facility's signs and furniture were replaced during a $21 million interior renovation completed in 2014, designed to fix wayfinding issues caused by inconsistent signage.

=== Second expansion ===
The convention center's logo from 2010 to 2022, featuring the name used from its 1988 opening

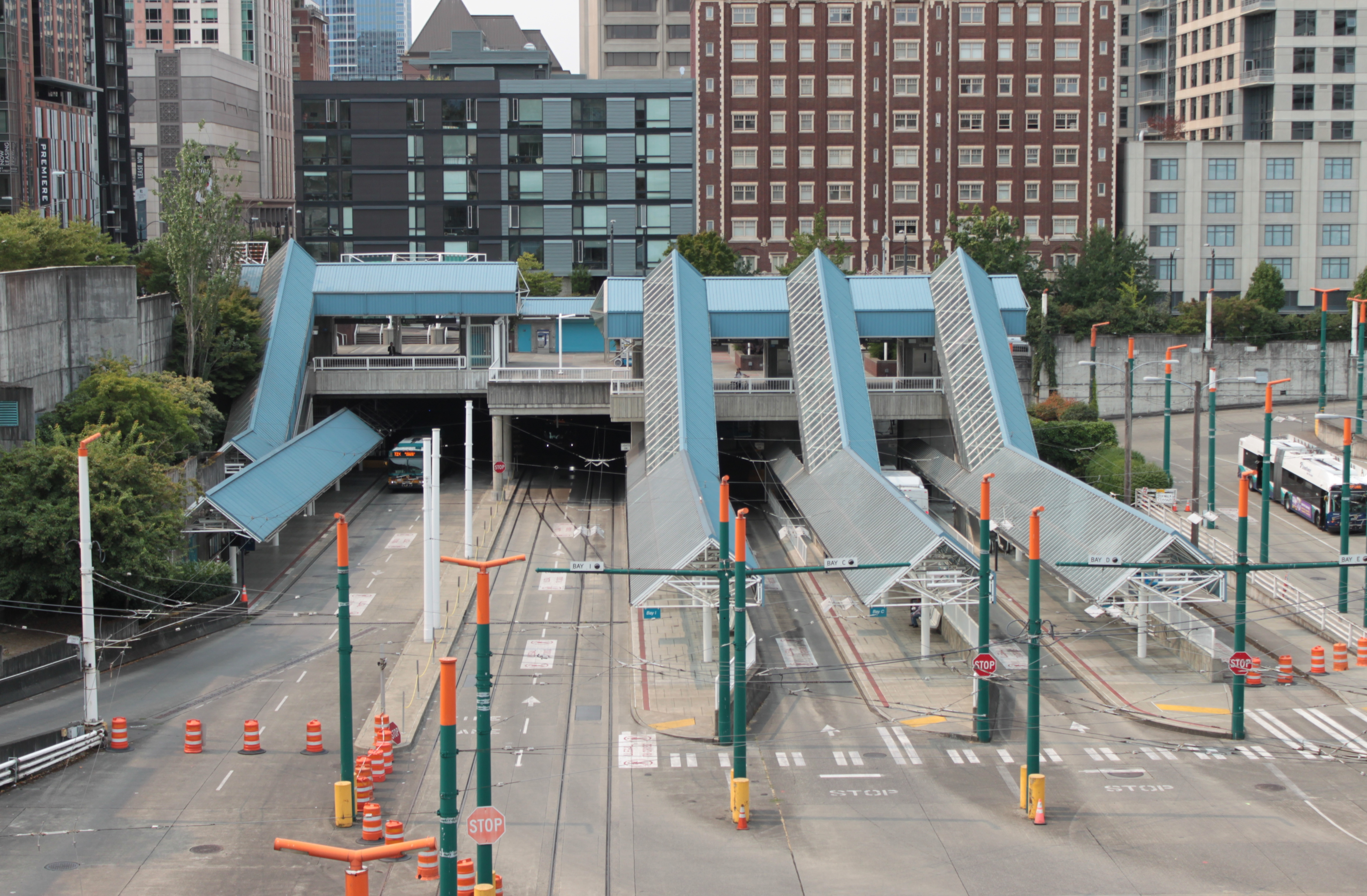
The Convention Place transit station, which was demolished to make way for the convention center's second expansion

A second major expansion of the convention center planned to double the amount of exhibition space with a new building on the site of the Convention Place transit station, was proposed in 2008 at a cost of $766 million. The convention center board proposed an appropriation of $15 million in hotel tax revenue to be used to acquire options on land needed for the project. The state legislature rejected the appropriation in May 2009, effectively putting the project on hold.

The proposal was revived in 2012 and expanded to include two triangular blocks to the north of the transit station, then occupied by a car dealership. The convention center proposed a 1.2-million-square-foot (110,000 m^{2}) expansion with 310,000 square feet (29,000 m^{2}) of exhibition space and several office or hotel towers built by co-developers. The convention center board acquired the dealership at Olive Way and Boren Avenue for $56.5 million in January 2014, condemned a property on Howell Street in March 2015, and paid $6.6 million to Sound Transit in October 2015 for the last property outside of the transit station. A preliminary agreement with King County to acquire the Convention Place transit station for $147 million was signed in November 2015 and finalized in June 2017 for a total cost of $162 million.

LMN Architects was selected as the lead architect of the project. Pine Street Group was named the co-developer and project manager for the convention portion and the associated private development. The convention center proposed a modified plan centered around a five-story building housing the exhibition hall, several meeting spaces, retail space, a large ballroom, a rooftop garden, and 800 parking spaces. The 150,000-square-foot (14,000 m^{2}) exhibition hall would be located below street level and feature skylights and publicly-accessible spaces, including a high lobby on 9th Avenue. The building would also cantilever over a small section of Interstate 5 at the intersection of Pine Street and Boren Avenue. The northern blocks of the site would have underground truck loading ramps and a pair of high-rise towers: a 30-story tower with 428 apartments and a 16-story office building. The $1.4 billion project was scheduled to begin construction in 2017 and open in 2020, adding 440,000 square feet (41,000 m^{2}) of usable space—approximately double the current convention center's interior space. It is planned to be funded using revenue from development rights, the countywide hotel-motel tax, and a proposed tax on short-term rental services like Airbnb.

Skanska–Hunt were initially chosen as the project's general contractors but were removed from the project in March 2016. They sued the convention center and Pine Street Group for wrongful termination of the contract. The lawsuit was settled for a payment of $7.8 million. The convention center hired a joint venture of Lease Crutcher Lewis and Clark Construction as the project's new general contractor. Due to delays in receiving city approval and permits, construction was pushed back to May 2018 and its cost increased to $1.7 billion. In May 2018, the city council approved the project's street vacation for Terry Avenue in exchange for $80 million in public benefits. These included funding for affordable housing, improvements to Freeway Park and nearby bicycle lanes, and a study into lidding portions of Interstate 5.

Convention Place station was permanently closed on July 21, 2018, and demolition began shortly afterwards. On August 14, ground was broken on construction of the convention center expansion; the new building was named "Summit", while the original convention center was renamed to "Arch". The contractors for the project used a "billboarding" process that divides structure erection into zones to shorten construction of the convention center's structural components. Hudson Pacific Properties acquired the rights to the northeastern tower site on Boren Avenue and planned to build a 16-story office building that would have opened in late 2022.

In May 2020, the project development team announced that they would seek financial assistance from the federal government and bonds to fill $300 million in unmet needs. The project is planned to be dependent on lodging tax revenue, which fell by 60 percent due to the COVID-19 pandemic. A $100 million loan from King County was proposed in December 2020 to continue work on the project, which had slowed during the pandemic. The state government and city government also offered to join the loan deal to fill the funding gap. In April 2021, the convention center announced that it had sold $342 million in municipal bonds to private institutions to fund the budget shortfall with approval from the Washington State Treasurer in lieu of public financing. The Summit building topped out in June 2021 and hosted its first event on January 13, 2023; its final cost was nearly $2 billion. To prepare for its opening, the entire complex was renamed to the Seattle Convention Center (SCC) on April 18, 2022; the rebrand was originally planned to occur in June 2020 with fanfare, but was delayed and announced without a celebration due to the pandemic. Following the renaming, Hudson Pacific announced the start of construction on the 16-story office building, officially named Washington 1000, on April 28; the building was topped out in September 2023 and opened by early 2024.

== Facilities and layout ==
The convention center is adjacent to several downtown hotels and the Pike–Pine retail corridor, which includes Westlake Center and Pacific Place. It is served by several transit routes, including King County Metro and Sound Transit Express buses on surface streets. Westlake station in the Downtown Seattle Transit Tunnel is the closest Link light rail station to the convention center and is served by the 1 Line, which travels south towards Seattle–Tacoma International Airport. The convention center has a concessions and catering contract with Aramark, which uses the exhibition hall kitchens on event days.

=== Arch ===
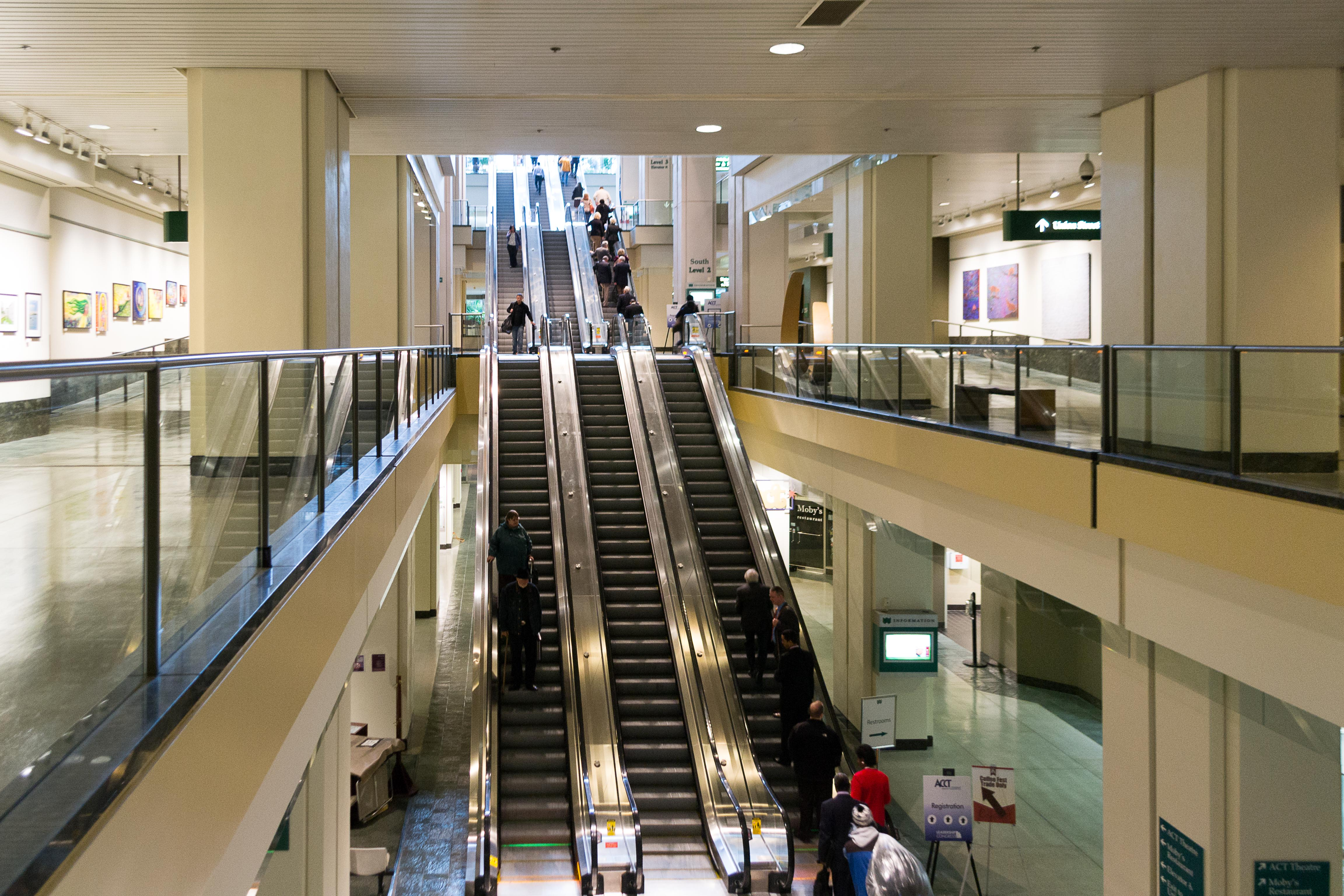
The main atrium of the Arch building, which covers four stories and runs north–south

The Arch building is located along Pike Street between 7th Avenue and Hubbell Place in Downtown Seattle. The complex straddles Pike Street, 8th Avenue, and Interstate 5, stretching from Union Street in the south to Pine Street in the north. It is six stories tall and has 414,722 square feet (38,529 m^{2}) of rentable event space. The building's main public space is a four-story atrium with restaurants, shops, and public artwork. Each floor has a lobby, with two that open to street-level entrances: the Pike Lobby at Pike Street, which includes a visitor center, and 7th Avenue and the Atrium Lobby facing Freeway Park and Union Square.

Arch has 236,700 square feet (21,990 m^{2}) of exhibition space on the fourth floor, divided into two halls connected by a 90-foot-wide (27 m) skybridge across the north and south sides of Pike Street. It has a capacity for 1,105 booths or 8,000 people seated for plenary sessions. The exhibition level also has truck ramps connected to Hubbell Place and 23 loading docks, along with freight elevator access and a dedicated bridge over Pike Street. The facility's 68 meeting rooms are primarily on the second, third, and sixth floors and include 123,761 square feet (11,498 m^{2}) of total space. The meeting floors are shared with other uses: the second and third floors are also parking garages with a total of 1,490 stalls. The sixth has the facility's kitchen and four ballrooms with 44,628 square feet (4,146 m^{2}) of space.The convention center's administrative offices are located on the fifth floor, sharing space with several client conference rooms overlooking the exhibition hall. The conference center on the north side of Pike Street is a standalone facility with 71,000 square feet (6,596 m^{2}) on four floors.

==== Design and public art ====
TRA Architects and HNTB, with the assistance of Pietro Belluschi and environmental architect Angela Danadjieva, supervised the design of the convention center. Local firm Skilling Ward Magnusson Barkshire engineered the structure. It straddles twelve lanes of Interstate 5 using a series of 30 concrete columns and reinforced concrete pilings driven 100 feet (30 m) underground. The original building is 800 feet (240 m) wide and encloses a space equivalent to twelve downtown blocks, resting atop several steel trusses. In the event of a major vehicle fire under the convention center, the concrete ceiling of the freeway lid are designed to withstand high-temperature fires for up to eight hours and protect the steel from damage. The construction of the convention center also created a new traffic bottleneck on Interstate 5 due to decreased visibility caused by the building's shadow.

The design of the building was praised for its uniqueness compared to other convention centers, as well as its interactions with Freeway Park. The building uses irregularly shaped and landscaped terraces to hide its scale from street level and emulates the park by using interspersed plants and trees. The convention center's lobbies and atrium also include small trees, shrubs, ivy, and flowers in planters used to divide lounge areas. The south wall and atrium lobby is broken into green glass cubes that extend to the ceiling; it faces Ellis Plaza, an extension of the park that includes several pieces of public art commissioned and by the convention center's percent for art program.

The convention center's public art includes the Seattle George Monument by Buster Simpson, a 28-foot (8.5 m) high sculpture in Ellis Plaza that morphs between the silhouettes of George Washington and Chief Seattle. The plaza's Centennial Bell Garden includes 39 bells, provided by groups from every Washington county, and were selected by composer David Mahler to complement a Japanese temple bell. Jenny Holzer's Truism, Living and Survival hangs above the south atrium and generates phrases using ten electronic signs with words from various languages.

The convention center formally established its own arts program in 1997, under the leadership of board member Phyllis Lamphere. The program partnered with the Washington State Arts Commission in 2003 to curate and coordinate its art collection. The convention center produced several commissioned pieces for the 2001 expansion and received several loaned works from private collections and public museums. The second floor of the atrium, named the Phyllis Lamphere Gallery, hosts exhibitions of local art that is rotated several times per year.

=== Summit ===
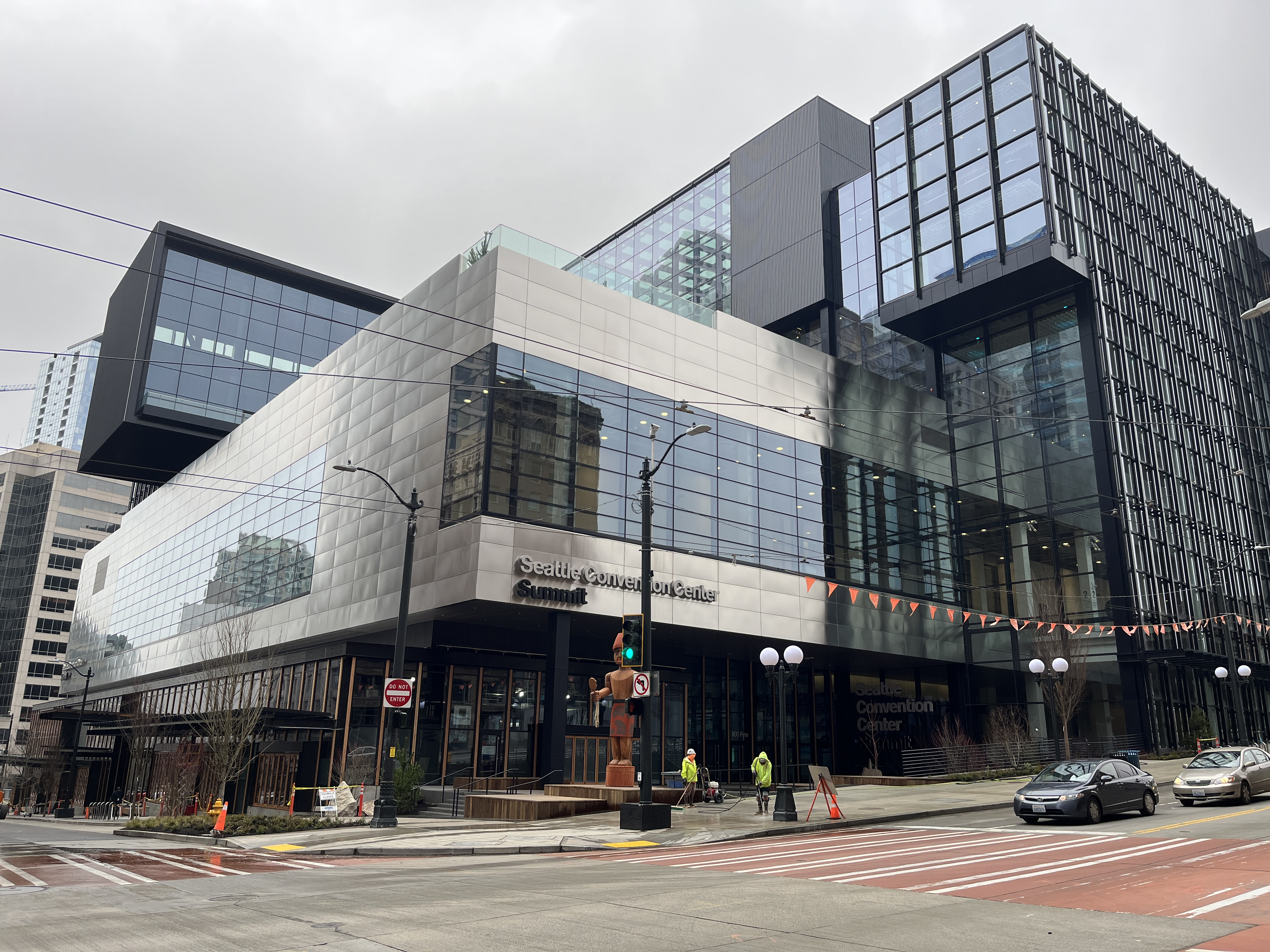
Southwest exterior of Summit from Pine Street

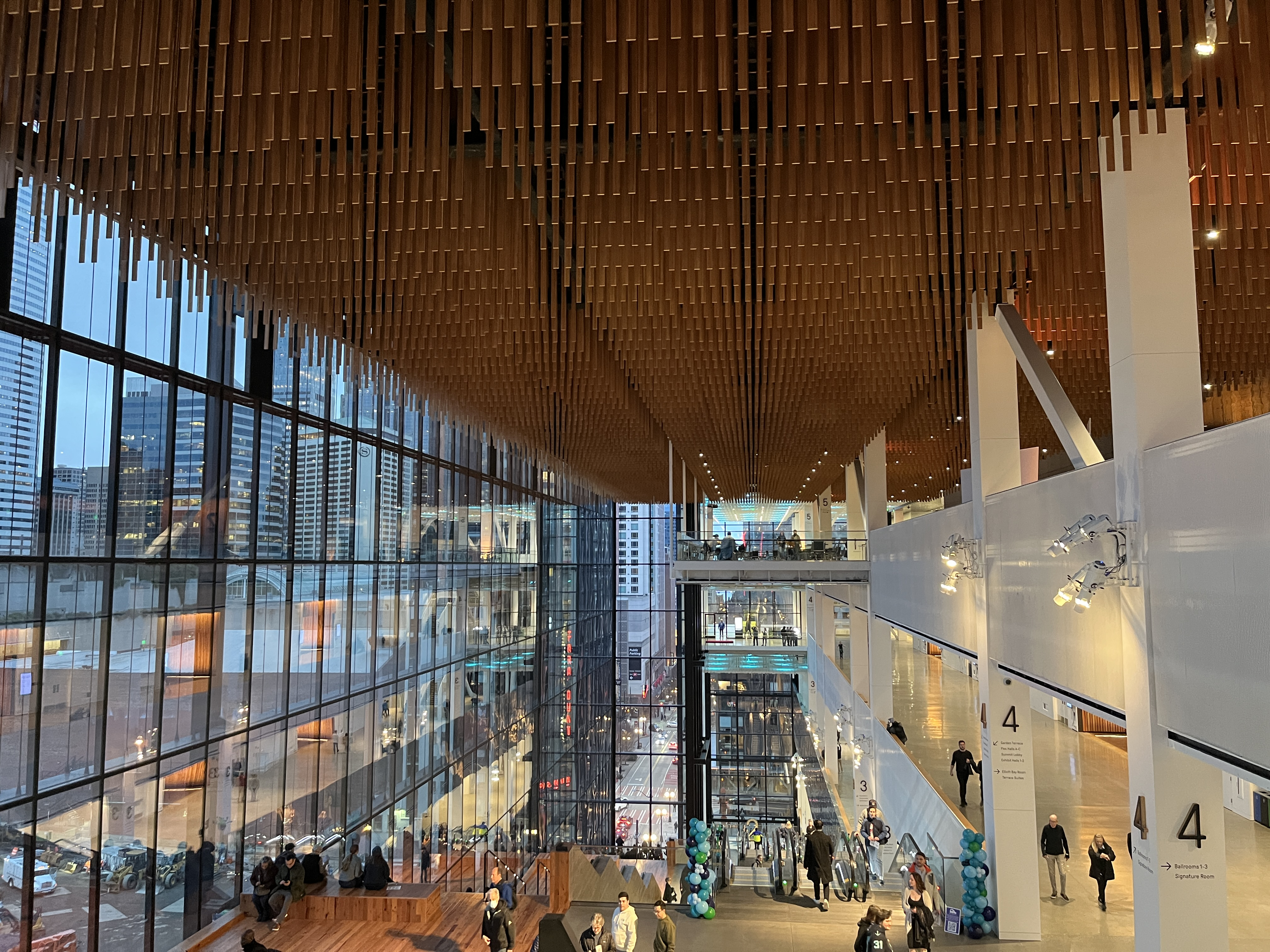
The main atrium at Summit, seen from the fifth floor in 2023

The Summit building, opened in 2023, is one block northeast of the Arch building and contains 573,770 square feet (53,305 m^{2}) of exhibition and meeting space. It is bound by Pine Street to the south and Olive Way to the north, with 9th Avenue to the west and Boren Avenue to the east; the northeast corner of the building hangs over a section of Interstate 5. The ground floor includes a lobby, retail spaces, and a public parking garage with 700 spaces; several mezzanines connect to a subterranean exhibition space and a flex hall above the ground floor. Two floors are reserved for 62 meeting rooms and an outdoor terrace, while the highest floors are a 58,000-square-foot (5,400 m^{2}) ballroom. Summit has 19 elevators, 42 escalators, and several stairways. The facility has a loading dock with 18 bays. The expansion incorporates environmentally-friendly features, including a rooftop solar array, reclaimed wood furnishings, radiant flooring for heating, and fabric paneling. The wood finishes use local species from the Pacific Northwest.

Salvaged timber from demolished buildings was used for railings and lobby accents; ballroom panels were made from logs that once floated in Pacific Northwest waters, bearing marks from burrowing molluscs; and the Hill Climb features Madrona wood, a native species found from British Columbia to Northern California.

The building's initial retail tenants include Ethan Stowell's restaurant Bombo Italian Kitchen, a Monorail Espresso location, and Piroshky Piroshky. Additional spaces for Wild Rye Bakery and Pike Brewing also opened in 2023.

==== Public artwork ====
Summit includes more than 20 pieces of public artwork that is valued at $7.75 million and was included due to a public benefits clause in the facility's operating contract with the city and county governments. Five Indigenous women were selected to create artwork for the building's collection, including several carvings by Malynn Foster. Mowitch Man by Andrea Wilbur-Sigo of the Squaxin Island Tribe is installed outside the building, facing west toward Elliott Bay in a plaza at the intersection of Pine Street and Ninth Avenue. The statue was carved from a 20-foot Western red cedar log. Another entrance features Wilbur-Sigo's Creator, a statue depicting a pregnant woman with a baby on her back. We Are All Connected is a series of sandstone sculptures with petroglyphs by Malynn Foster of the Squaxin Island and Skokomish Nations; one of the sculptures, called 17 Days We Wake Up the World, is about the orca Tahlequah. Other artworks include a steel enclosure resembling a burden basket by Kimberly Deriana (Mandan and Hidatsa) and four masks made of cast bronze, steel, and cast glass by Jennifer Angaiak Wood (Yup'ik).

Aluminum panels at the street level were created by Satpreet Kahlon, Ulises Mariscal, Maki Tamura, and Robert Hardgrave. The interior also features A Place in the Woods by Cathy McClure and LMN Architects. The work comprises 45 perforated wooden panels that hang over the street level lobby. A new work by Dan Webb, a stained glass window inspired by local marquee signs, is expected to be installed near the southwest entrance in 2023. The Summit building was awarded LEED Platinum certification in December 2023 for its environmentally friendly features and design, which included reduced carbon emissions and energy use.

== Administration ==
A public facilities district, created in 2010 to replace direct management by the state government, operates the Seattle Convention Center. The public facilities district is governed by a board of directors with nine members. The City of Seattle, King County, and the Governor of Washington each select three members appointed to two- or four-year terms. A countywide hotel-motel tax primarily funds the public facilities district. It has approximately $907 million in total assets.

== Events ==
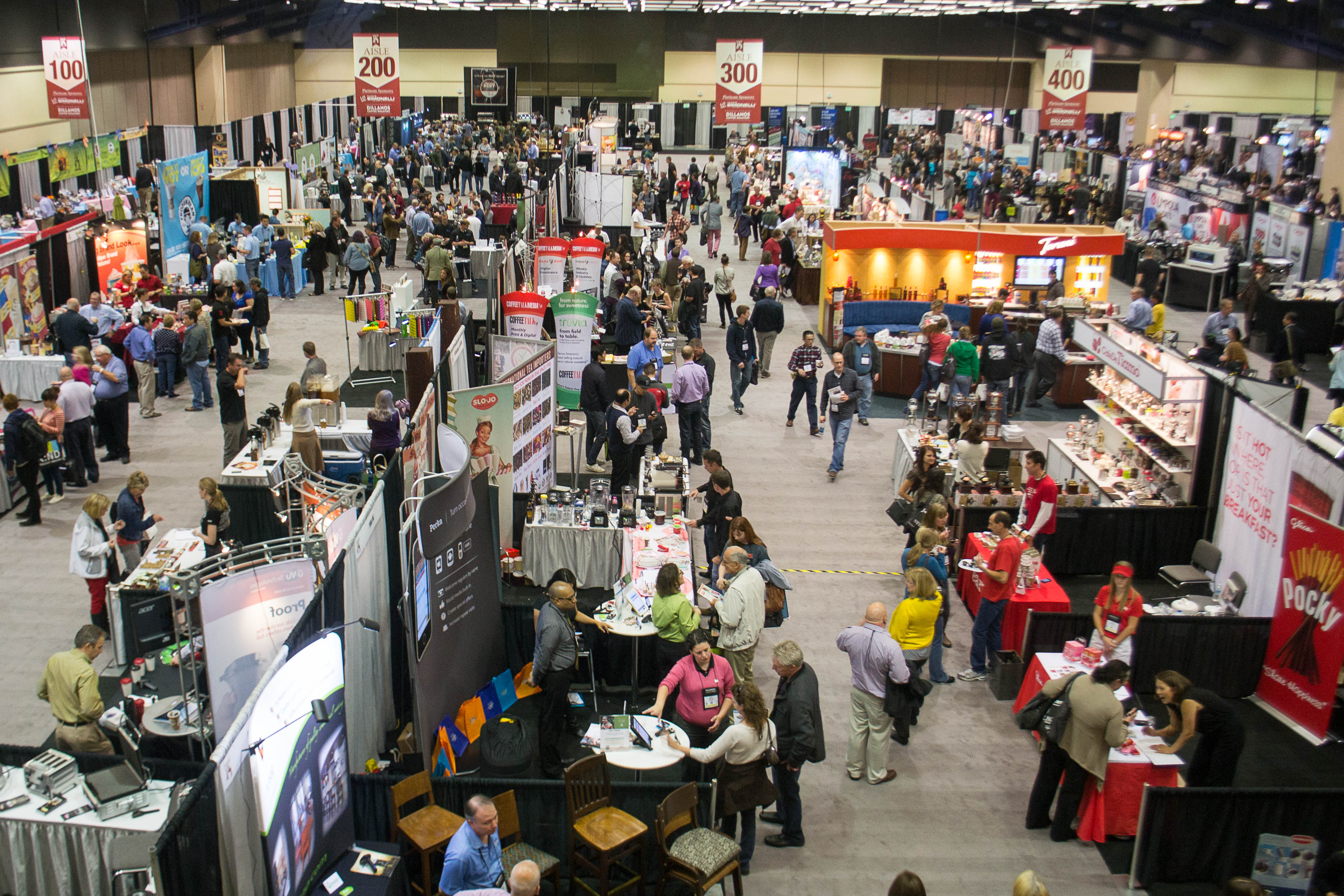
A coffee trade show at the Washington State Convention Center in 2013

In 2023, the convention center hosted 160 total events that drew a total of 350,837 people. Of the events, 54 were classified as national or international. In the 2010s, the convention center regularly hosted over 300 annual events that drew around 400,000 people. Attendance had remained stagnant since late 1990s, and the convention center spent 40 percent of days without a large convention in session. The convention center reportedly turned away more events than it booked prior to the COVID-19 pandemic and expansion.

The convention center hosts several large annual events that draw in excess of 10,000 attendees. Among the facility's largest events are local fan conventions focused on various subcultures: PAX West, a gaming event hosted annually in September since 2007; Emerald City Comic Con, which moved to the convention center in 2008; and Sakura-Con, an anime convention hosted at the convention center since 2006. The convention center's largest trade show is the Northwest Flower and Garden Show, hosted since 1989 and attracting 60,000 visitors. Since 2017, the convention center has also hosted Microsoft's Build developer conference, which drew 6,000 attendees in 2018.

=== 1999 WTO conference ===
The convention center was selected as the venue of the 1999 conference of the World Trade Organization, to be attended by 3,000 delegates and 2,000 journalists and observers. The state legislature approved $970,000 in funds to prepare the convention center for the conference, which was scheduled to take place from November 30 to December 3. The funds covered security measures for President Bill Clinton, Secretary of State Madeleine Albright, and United Nations Secretary General Kofi Annan, who were all expected to attend. The first days of the conference were interrupted by widespread protests that blocked access to the convention center and the conference ultimately ended with the collapse of trade talks. The WTO meeting and protests did not cause widespread disruption to convention center operations, with only one rescheduled event and no cancelled bookings.

=== COVID-19 pandemic ===
Over ten major events at the convention center scheduled for March 2020 were cancelled due to the COVID-19 pandemic and the state government's prohibition of large public events. Among the affected events are the Emerald City Comic Con, which was initially rescheduled for August, and Sakura-Con, which was cancelled entirely. The convention center also cancelled shifts for employed workers and contractors, and the event cancellations also contributed to a decline in local hotel bookings. The convention center's other major events, including PAX, were also cancelled, leaving it without a major scheduled event until December 2020.

The convention center was allowed to reopen in September 2020 following the lifting of COVID restrictions by the state government in their phased reopening plan. The first full-scale event since the beginning of the pandemic was PAX West, hosted in September 2021 with approximately 17,000 sold tickets. Attendees were required to show proof of vaccination or a negative COVID-19 test before entering the convention center. The convention center had approximately 70,000 total attendees in 2021 and returned to its pre-pandemic level by 2024; it reached its all-time high of 475,000 attendees in 2025.

== See also ==
- Lumen Field – a stadium in Seattle with a small convention center
