= Convention Place station =

Defunct bus station in Seattle, Washington, U.S.

Convention Place
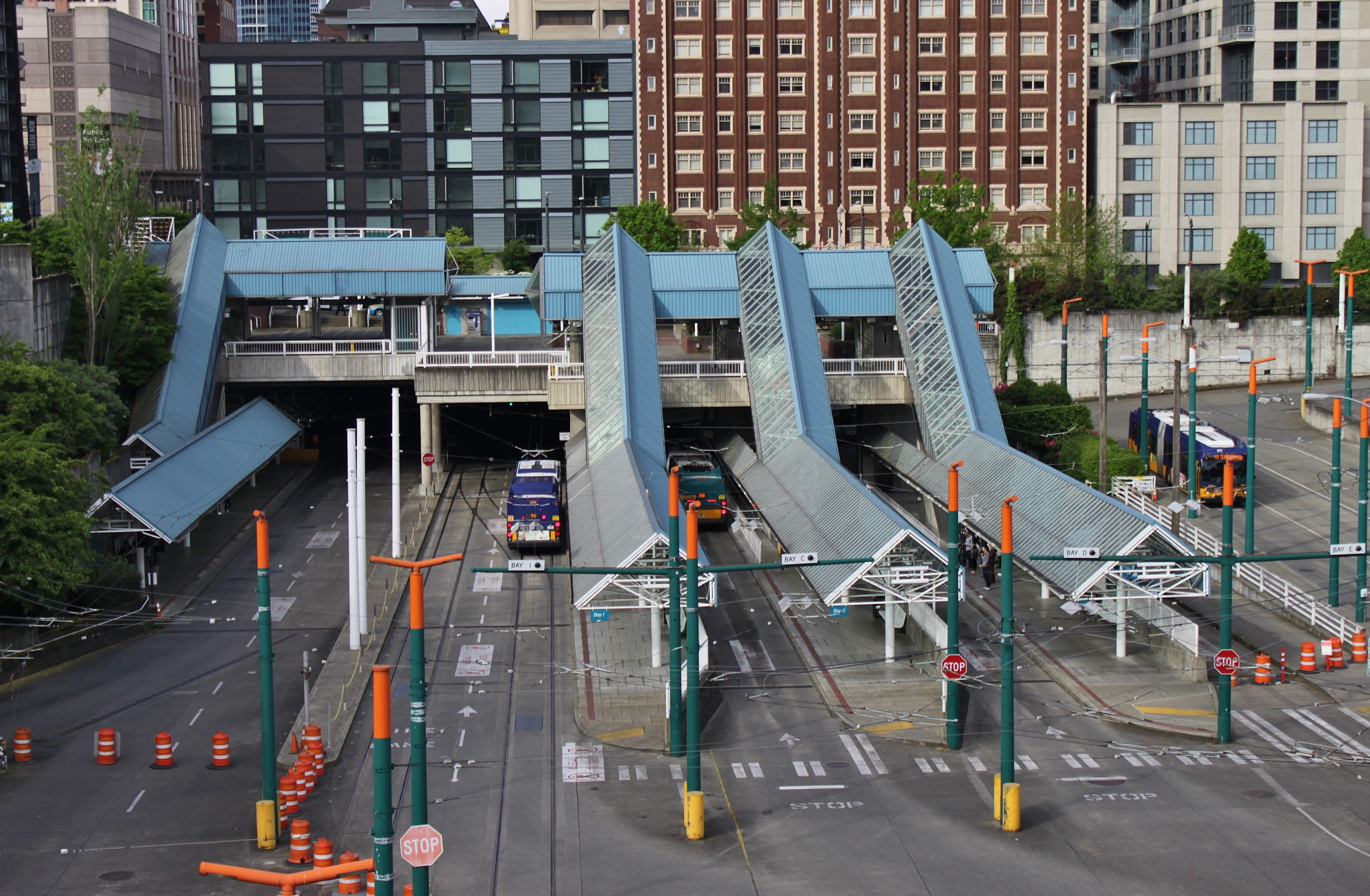
- Westward view from Boren Avenue at the platforms and plaza level, two years prior to closure

General information
- Location: Pine Street & 9th Avenue; Seattle, Washington, U.S.
- Coordinates: 47°36′50″N 122°19′55″W
- System: Transit tunnel station
- Owner: King County Metro
- Bus routes: 7
- Bus stands: 5
- Bus operators: King County Metro, Sound Transit Express
- Connections: Community Transit, King County Metro, Sound Transit Express

Construction
- Structure type: Surface
- Parking: Pay parking nearby
- Cycle facilities: Bicycle rack
- Accessible: yes

History
- Opened: September 15, 1990
- Closed: July 21, 2018
Location

Convention Place station was a bus station in Seattle, Washington, United States. It served as the northern terminus of the Downtown Seattle Transit Tunnel, a facility used by King County Metro and Sound Transit Express buses. Link light rail, which stops at the tunnel's four other stations, did not serve Convention Place. From the station, buses continued onto the Interstate 5 reversible express lanes or Olive Way via two exits. The station's platforms were accessed from a plaza located at the intersection of Pine Street and 9th Avenue near the Washington State Convention Center and Paramount Theatre.

The station began construction in 1987 and opened on September 15, 1990. During planning of the Link light rail system in the 1990s, Convention Place was identified as a potential light rail stop or terminus, but was cut in favor of a deeper crossing of Interstate 5 towards Capitol Hill. The station was offered by Metro as a site for transit-oriented development and attracted interest from the convention center for a potential expansion. After a stalled attempt in 2009, the expansion was launched in the early 2010s and Convention Place station was sold for $162 million.

Convention Place station was permanently closed on July 21, 2018, a few months before bus service in the transit tunnel ended. After demolition, the Seattle Convention Center Summit building was constructed on the site and opened in 2023.

== History ==
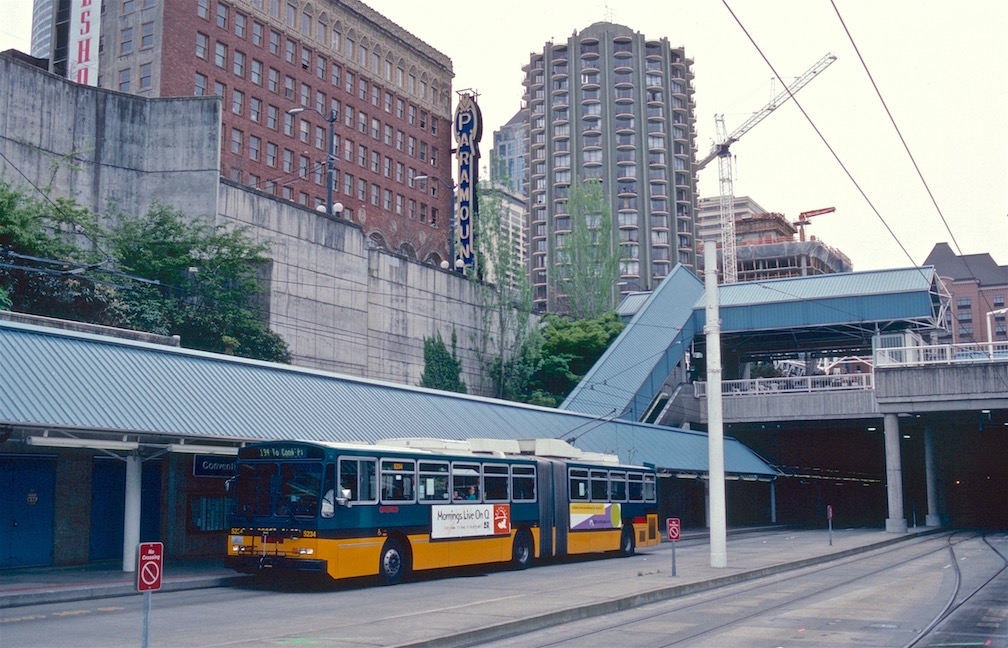
A dual-mode bus at Convention Place station, seen in 2000. The Paramount Theatre overlooked the station and its retaining wall on Pine Street.

The Metro Transit Committee selected the intersection of Pine Street and Interstate 5 as the preferred northern terminus for the proposed downtown transit system — either a bus tunnel or surface transit mall — in 1979. The busway alternative would have placed a major terminal at either Westlake Park or a two-block section of Pine Street on the west side of Interstate 5. The bus tunnel was chosen by Metro in November 1983, including a northern portal at Pine Street and 9th Avenue. By early 1984, a site on Pike Street one block south of the planned tunnel portal was chosen for the city's planned convention center, which would open by the end of the decade.

Construction of the northern portal station, later named Convention Place, began after the acquisition of a 16-unit low-income apartment building, a medical center, and several small businesses. SCI Contractors of Calgary was awarded the $74.5 million contract for the Pine Street segment, including Convention Place and Westlake stations, in February 1987. The Pine Street ramp to the Interstate 5 express lanes was closed in April, along with a segment of Pine Street between 3rd and Boren avenues. Excavation of the Pine Street tunnel was complete by the end of the year and temporarily backfilled during the Christmas shopping season for use of Pine Street by automobile traffic. Excavation of the Convention Place station continued into the following year; by the end of 1988, construction of the exit ramp to Olive Way and the electrical substation had been completed. The bus tunnel was completed in early 1990, and Convention Place station was dedicated during an opening celebration on September 14, 1990. Bus service in the tunnel began the following day, with the inaugural run traveling southbound from Convention Place station. At Convention Place and the tunnel's other terminus, International District, the dual-mode buses used in the tunnel would switch from diesel fuel to electric overhead wires, functioning as trolleybuses within the tunnel. The dual-mode fleet was replaced in 2004 with hybrid buses, which switch from diesel to their electric batteries at the termini.

=== Light rail plans and renovation ===
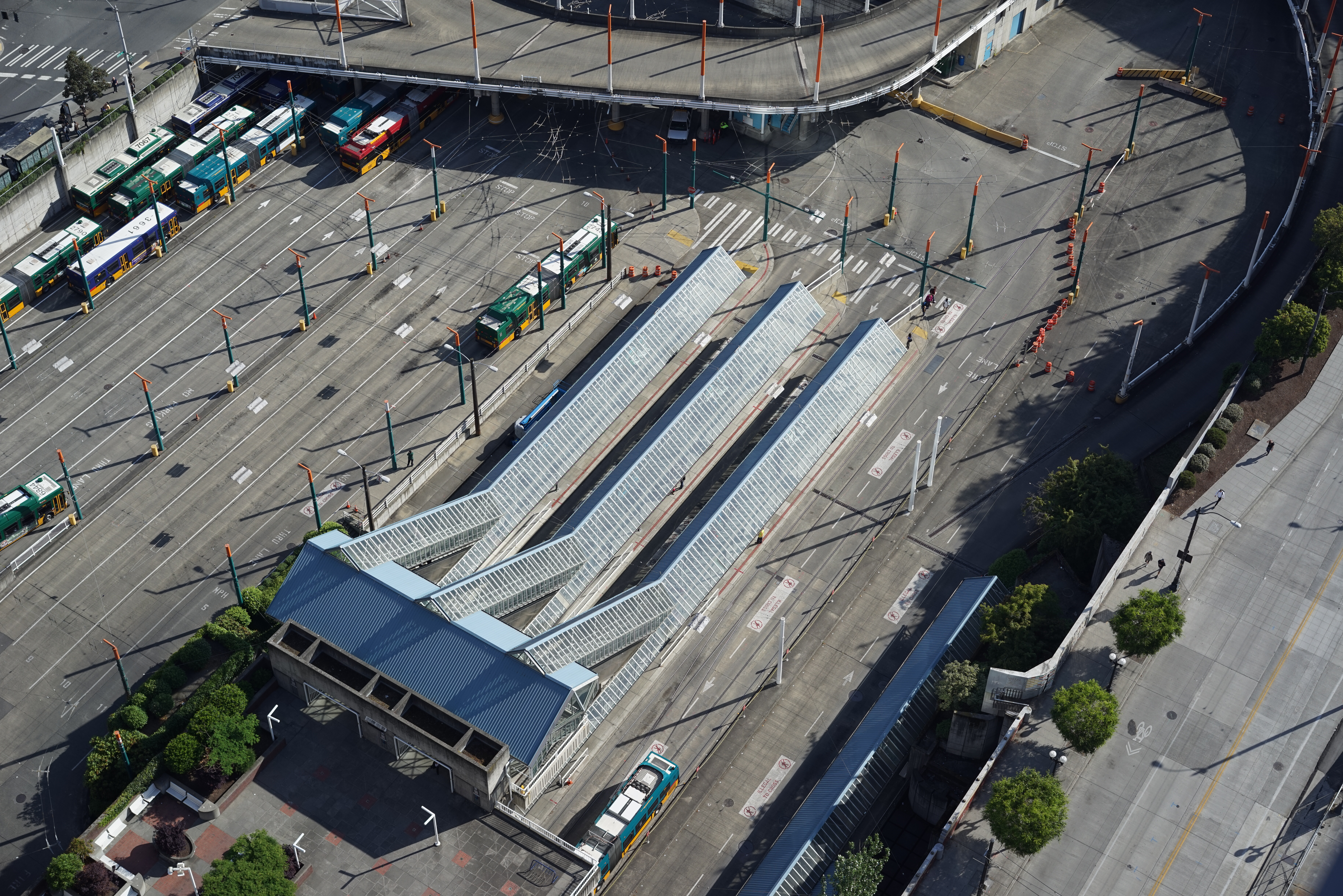
Overhead view of Convention Place station and its bus staging area, including several unused light rail tracks

The bus tunnel was designed to accommodate light rail trains, including pre-installed rails that were later found unusable due to their inadequate insulation. In early light rail plans, Convention Place was listed as the northernmost downtown station before trains continued towards First Hill or Eastlake. Voters in the Seattle metropolitan area approved the Sound Move package in 1996, funding a light rail system to be built by Sound Transit. A 1998 report from Sound Transit stated that a light rail line continuing north from downtown would be unable to use Convention Place due to its shallow height and recommended its abandonment. Metro and several members of the Sound Transit Board requested that the station be kept and modified in order to serve the expanded convention center, delaying a decision for several months. In their preferred alternative for the Central Link light rail project, published in 1999, Sound Transit selected a tunnel route that avoids Convention Place. Sound Transit took ownership of the four southern bus tunnel stations in 2000, while King County Metro retained Convention Place for potential redevelopment into office or hotel use.

Sound Transit began re-evaluating the light rail project in 2001 due to a funding shortfall and the discovery of soil issues along the route of the planned tunnel to the University District. The light rail line was shortened to the segment between Downtown Seattle and Seattle–Tacoma International Airport, leaving the remainder to Capitol Hill, the University District, and Northgate for a future expansion. The Sound Transit Board chose Convention Place as the northern terminus of the line in September 2001, but was replaced by a Westlake terminus in the Record of Decision issued by the Federal Transit Administration in May 2002. Further study of Convention Place as a light rail station on the northern extension was discontinued by Sound Transit later that month after the agency's study concluded that it would have no effect on ridership and lead to greater engineering difficulties. For the extension's Eastlake alternatives, a new rail-only station would have been built 40 to 60 feet (12 to 18 m) below street level.

The bus tunnel was closed on September 23, 2005, for a two-year renovation of the four stations set to receive light rail service. The ramps from the Interstate 5 express lanes to Convention Place remained open during construction, allowing buses to continue onto 9th Avenue towards Stewart Street. A short tunnel under Pine Street on the south side of the station was also built as a future turnback area for trains and as part of the extension to Capitol Hill. The tunnel was reopened on September 24, 2007, with the other stations receiving major refurbishment and Convention Place retaining its original equipment.

=== Closure and redevelopment ===
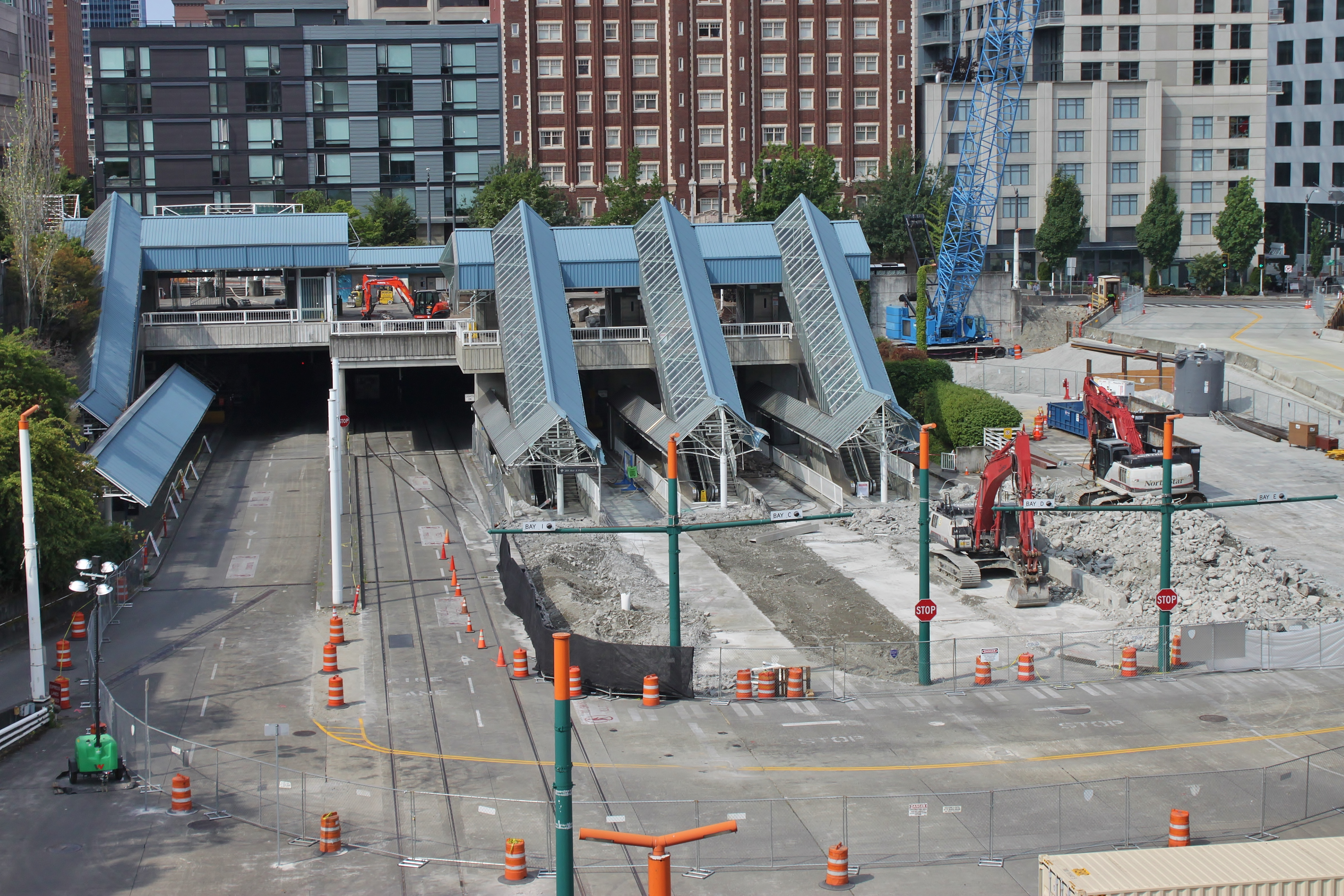
Demolition of the platforms, as seen in late July 2018

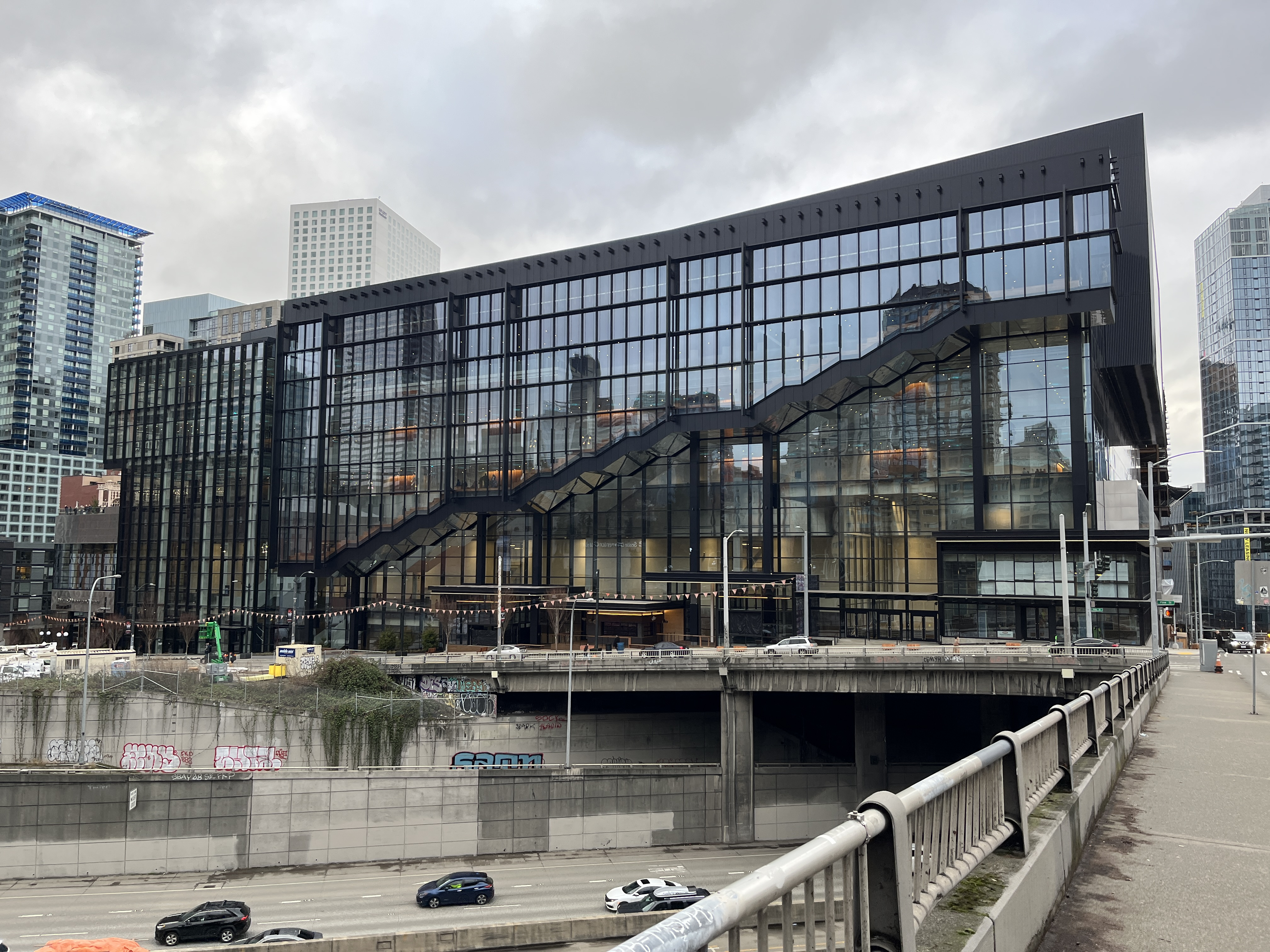
Site of the station after redevelopment, as seen in January 2023

Convention Place station had been envisioned by Metro as a site for high-rise development since the transit tunnel was designed in the 1980s. The eventual abandonment of the station after buses are phased out of the transit tunnel spurred Metro to offer the land to developers for $32 million in 2000, and eventually air rights that allow for continued transit use. A feasibility and market study was planned to be published in 2001, but was later put on hold.

In 2008, the Washington State Convention and Trade Center Board proposed a $766 million addition to the convention center on the site of Convention Place station, doubling the amount of exhibition space. The expansion, which would have been completed in 2014, was put on hold after the state legislature turned down a tax increase to support the project. The convention center revived its expansion plans in 2012, conducting a feasibility study and acquiring nearby properties along Olive Way; in early plans, the convention center offered to build a mixed-use complex atop the station in addition to exhibition space. Negotiations between the convention center and transit agencies began in 2014 and ended with a preliminary agreement in November 2015 to sell the station. Under the preliminary agreement, Metro would sell the station for $147 million, to be paid over a period of thirty years with interest, and end bus service in 2019 or 2020. A finalized sale was approved by the King County Council in June 2017, raising the cost to $162 million and closing the tunnel to buses as early as March 2019. In May 2018, the Seattle City Council approved a street vacation for the project and the closure of the transit tunnel in March 2019, pending surface street improvements for transit.

The station was closed on July 21, 2018, and was replaced by a set of new stops on 9th Avenue serving the tunnel's remaining buses. A $4 million bus ramp was constructed to connect 9th Avenue to the transit tunnel while the rest of the station was being demolished. After the station site was fully cleared and construction of the convention center expansion began, the temporary ramp was demolished. A traction power substation for surface trolleybuses was removed in 2018, prior to construction of the convention center expansion. The remaining buses using the transit tunnel were moved to surface streets and truncated at light rail stations on March 23, 2019.

== Station layout ==
	Street Level	Exits/Entrances, Plaza, Ticket vending machine
Platform level	Northbound	→ Bus Bay E (101, 102, 150) northbound terminus →
Platform level	Side platform, doors opened on the right
Platform level		→ Unused lane
Platform level	Side platform, doors opened on the right
Platform level	Southbound	← Bus Bay D (550) northbound toward Interstate 90 (Westlake)
Platform level	Side platform, doors opened on the right
Platform level	Southbound	← Bus Bay C (101, 102, 150) southbound toward SODO Busway (Westlake)
Platform level	Side platform, doors opened on the right
Platform level	Southbound	← Bus Bay I (41, 74, 255) southbound toward Downtown Seattle (Westlake)
Platform level	Northbound	→ Bus Bay A (41, 74) northbound toward Interstate 5 →
Platform level	Northbound	→ Bus Bay B (255) eastbound toward State Route 520 →
Platform level	Side platform, doors opened on the right

Convention Place station was situated on four acres (1.6 ha) within two city blocks bounded to the south by Pine Street, to the west by 9th Avenue, to the north by Olive Way, and to the east by Boren Avenue and Interstate 5. It was located at the northeastern edge of Downtown Seattle, near the Denny Triangle and Capitol Hill neighborhoods, and was one of two Downtown Seattle Transit Tunnel stations to be partially open-air, alongside International District/Chinatown station. The station had one entrance, a plaza at the corner of Pine Street and 9th Avenue, which was across the street from the Paramount Theatre and one block from the Washington State Convention Center. The plaza included seating areas, planters, rider information, a ticket vending machine for ORCA cards, and a bicycle rack.

The station's platform level was located below the plaza and connected by stairs, escalators, and elevators. Uniquely among stations in the transit tunnel, it had four side platforms and five lanes for buses. Southbound buses were divided between three platforms, Bays C, D, and I, while northbound buses served the single platform containing Bays A and B. Northbound buses that terminated at Convention Place used Bay E, an additional drop-off only platform to the north of the Bay D platform. To the north of the platforms was a layover area for buses with eleven lanes that were able to store a total of 22 articulated buses. The station had one all-day entrance ramp, at the intersection of Olive Way and 9th Avenue, and one all-day exit at Olive Way and Terry Avenue via a ramp from the northbound platform. A third ramp connected the transit tunnel to the reversible Interstate 5 express lanes and changed direction depending on time of the day.

=== Art and architecture ===
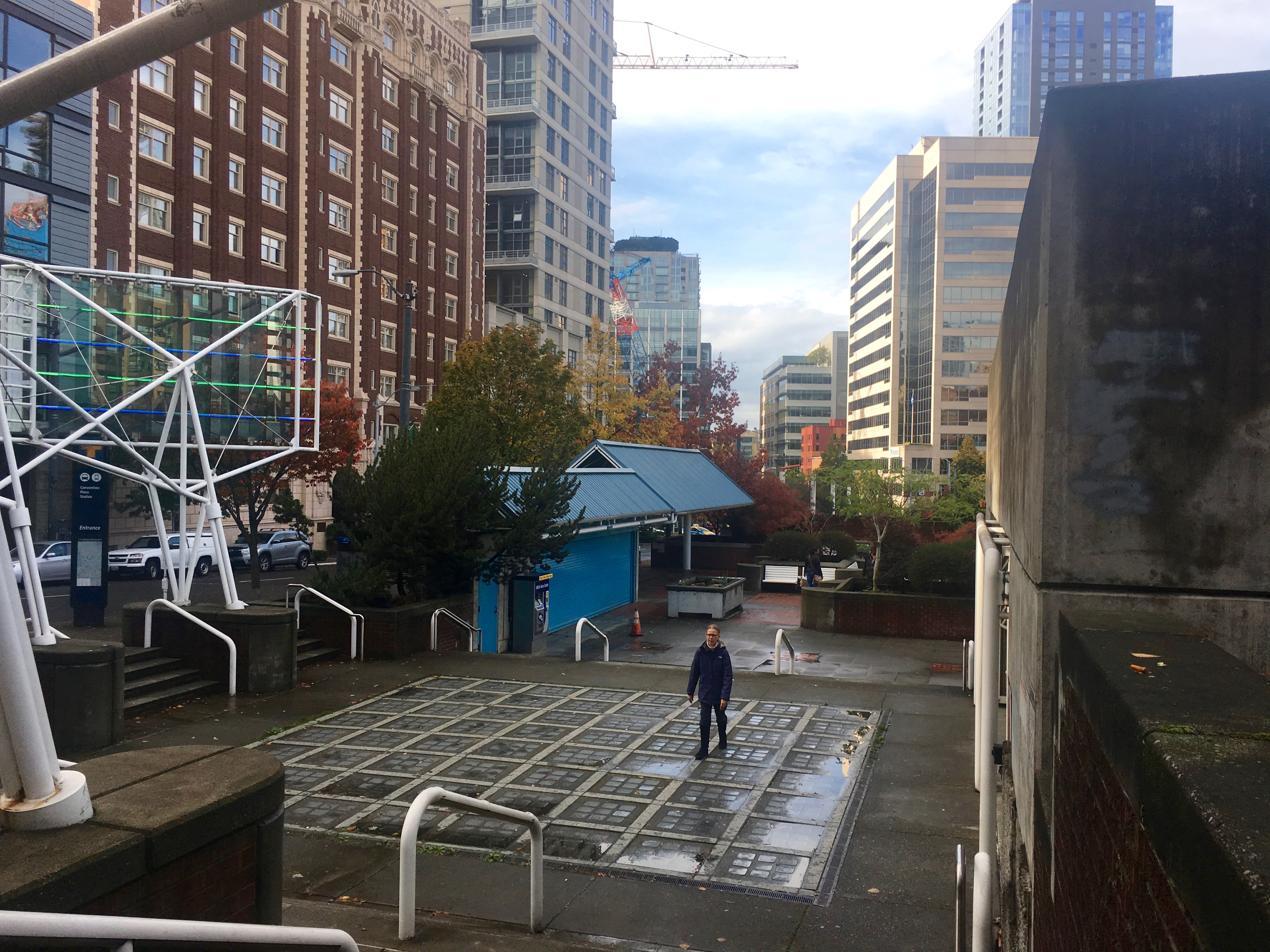
Plaza level at Convention Place station

Convention Place was designed by architect Robert Jones, in collaboration with lead artists Alice Adams and Jack Mackie. Its public art was made to fit a garden theme with landscaping similar to nearby Freeway Park. The entrance to the station's plaza was under a pair of prominent white-tube arches that resembled a classic theater marquee, designed by Adams to emulate the Paramount Theatre and New York City's Chrysler Building; at night, the tubes were lit by neon lights. The plaza included seating areas and planters designed by Maren Hassinger, integrating an Asian rock garden and natural forms carved into granite and concrete. Surrounding sidewalks included panels with a song title from Jimi Hendrix and a quote from activist Gordon Hirabayashi, along with their silhouettes. The station's support columns and retaining walls were sculpted into artificial cliffs and filled with plants and water features that once formed a waterfall down to the platform level that was designed by Mackie. Light and power poles in the station's layover areas were painted orange and green to continue the "Station in a garden" theme. A few years after the station opened, the retaining wall along Pine Street was converted from a graffitied wall into a ceramic mural, featuring silhouettes of Seattle residents and poetry written by students from Seattle high schools. Pieces of public art from the closed station were incorporated into Kate Clark's installation "What You Have Become" at the new Summit building at the Seattle Convention Center, which was built on the site of Convention Place station.

== Services ==
Convention Place was the only Downtown Seattle Transit Tunnel station that was served exclusively by buses, with no Link light rail service. At the time of its closure, the station was served at four outbound bays by seven bus routes: six King County Metro routes and one Sound Transit Express route. Bays A and B served three Metro routes (41, 74, and 255) that headed north and east via Interstate 5; Bay C was served by three Metro routes (101, 102, and 150) that headed south toward the SODO Busway; and Bay D was served by one Sound Transit route (550) that headed east on Interstate 90.

Convention Place station was also adjacent to several surface bus stops served by local and regional routes operated by Metro, Sound Transit, and Community Transit. Three Metro bus routes serving Capitol Hill and eastern Seattle stopped near 9th Avenue on Pine and Pike streets. Regional bus stops on Olive Way, Howell Street, and Stewart Street connected Convention Place to the Eastside area and Snohomish County. During closures of the transit tunnel, the Olive and Stewart bus stops were also used by tunnel buses that were re-routed onto surface streets.
