= Crowne Plaza Seattle-Downtown =

Hotel in Seattle, Washington, U.S.

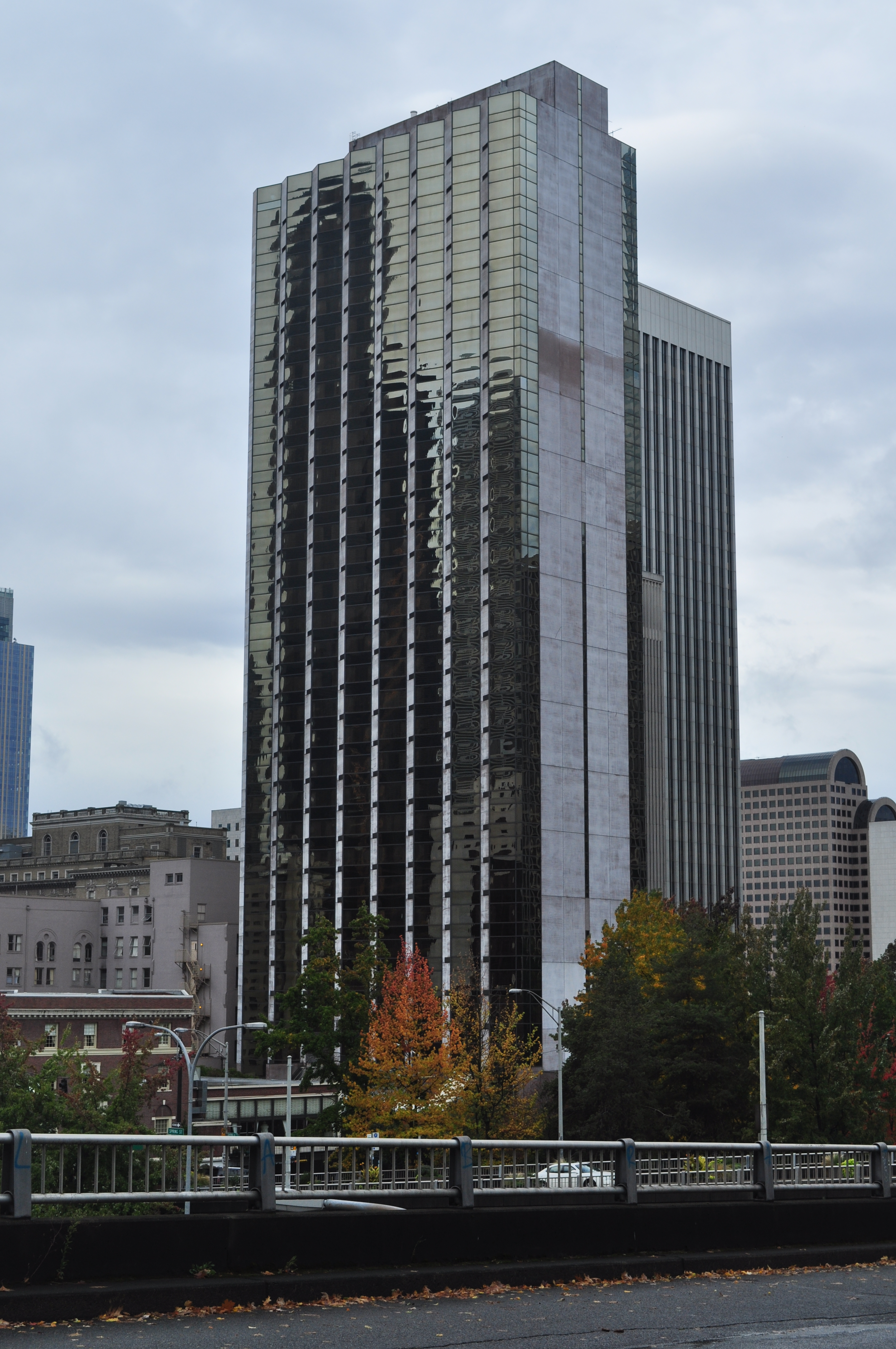
- The hotel's exterior, 2015
- Interactive map of the Crowne Plaza Seattle-Downtown area

General information
- Location: 1113 6th Avenue, Seattle, Washington, United States
- Coordinates: 47°36′29.5″N 122°19′56″W

The Crowne Plaza Seattle-Downtown is a 34-story hotel in downtown Seattle, in the U.S. state of Washington.

== Description and history ==
The building was completed in 1980 and renovated in 2019. Close to the Seattle Convention Center and generally geared towards business travelers, the Crowne Plaza Seattle has 415 rooms and suites. The hotel has a gym and the restaurant Regatta Bar & Grille.

Crowne Plaza Seattle is affiliated with IHG Hotels & Resorts and has been ranked number 48 in U.S. News & World Report's list of the best Seattle hotels. Lonely Planet says, "This 34-floor downtown skyscraper is more business-like than ostentatious, although a 2014 renovation has upped its ante somewhat. Get a room on one of the higher floors and enjoy broad Seattle vistas while swanning around in your bathrobe using the free wi-fi."
