= Pine Street =

East–west street in Seattle, Washington, U.S.

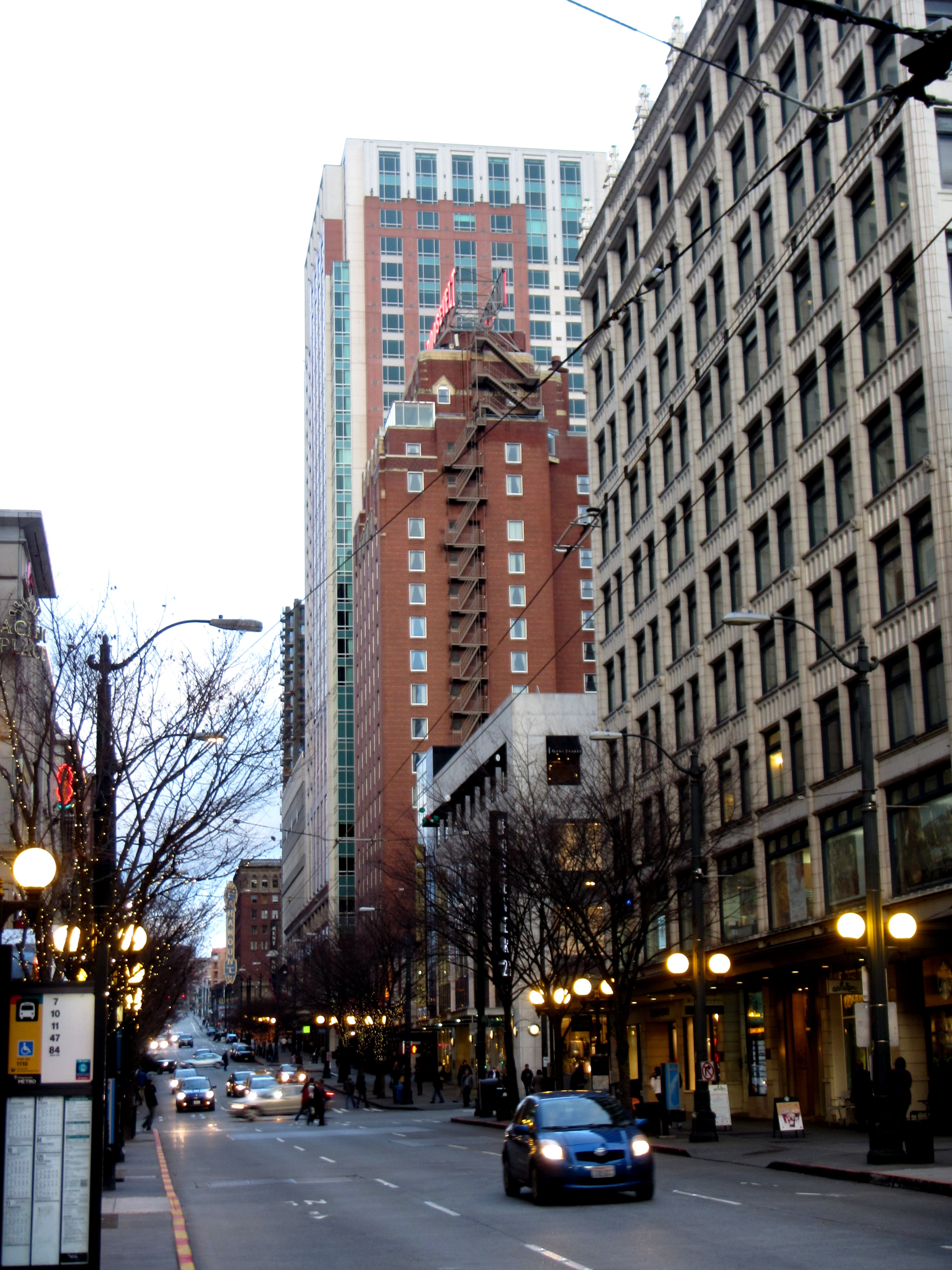
- Pine Street, Downtown Seattle in 2012
- Interactive map of Pine Street
- Type: Arterial street
- Maintained by: Seattle Department of Transportation
- Length: 3.0 mi (4.8 km)
- Location: Seattle, Washington, U.S.
- West end: Alaskan Way
- East end: 37th Avenue

Construction
- Commissioned: 1869

Pine Street is a major east–west street in Seattle, Washington, United States. It travels parallel to Pike Street between Downtown Seattle and the retail core to Capitol Hill, the Central District, and Madrona.

== Street description ==
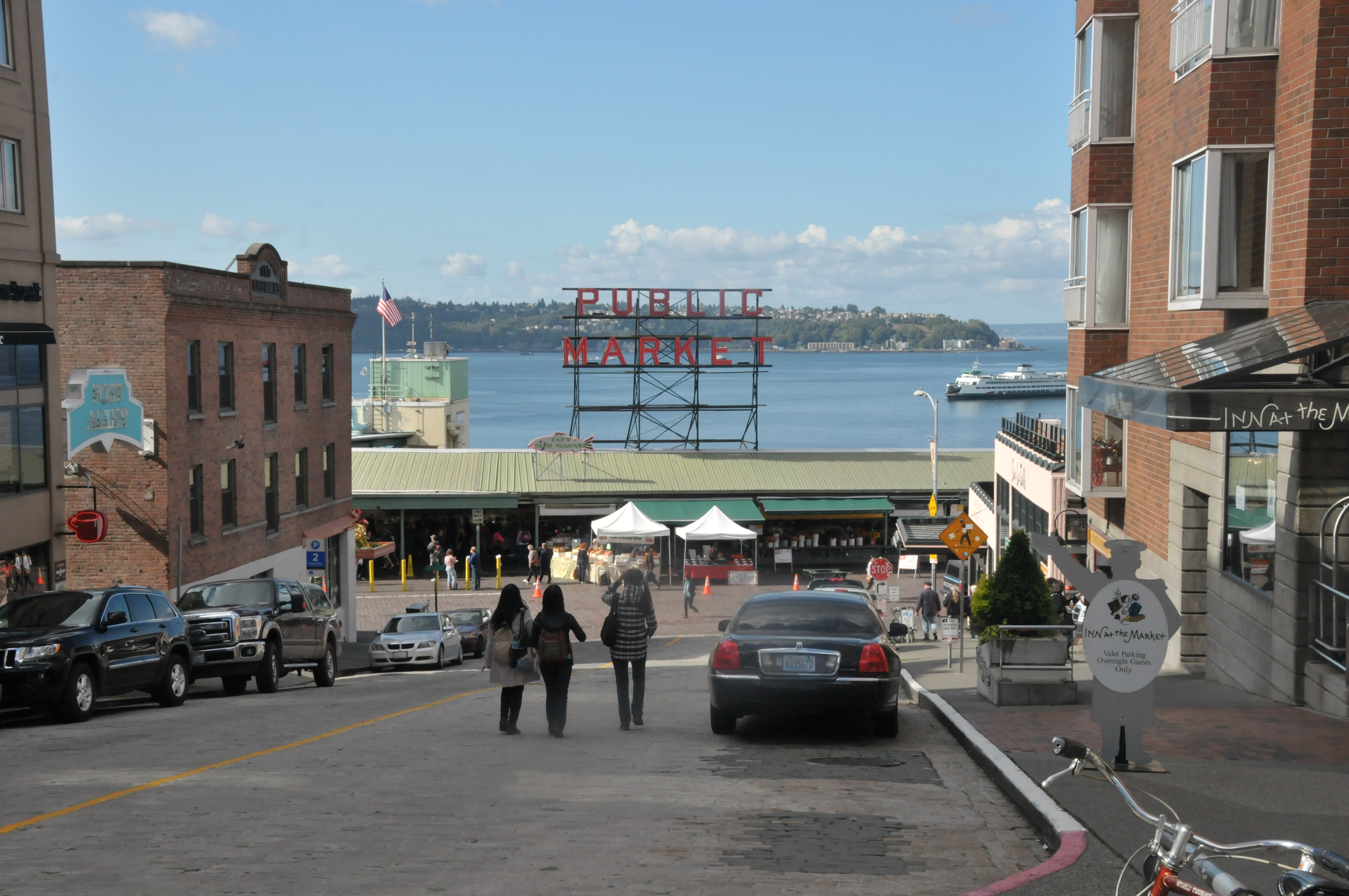
Looking west on Pine Street from 1st Avenue near Pike Place Market

Pine Street consists of several discontinuous sections that run between Olive Street and Olive Way to the north and Pike Street to the south. Its westernmost section is one block long and begins at Alaskan Way near Pier 62 on the city's waterfront, a block north of the Seattle Aquarium. It terminates at the former site of the Alaskan Way Viaduct, which led to a public staircase called the Pine Street Hillclimb, which provided access to Pike Place Market.

The main section of Pine Street in Downtown Seattle begins at Pike Place Market, intersecting the eponymous Pike Place and traveling northeast and uphill to 1st Avenue. The bi-directional street then switches to westbound-only traffic with a protected bicycle lane along its south side. Pine Street is the center of Seattle's downtown retail district, passing several major retail buildings from west to east: the former Bon Marché flagship store between 3rd and 4th avenues; the Westlake Center shopping mall and Westlake Park between 4th and 5th; Nordstrom's flagship store between 5th and 6th; and Pacific Place mall between 6th and 7th. This section is also home to the Westlake station of the Downtown Seattle Transit Tunnel, which is served by Link light rail.

Pine Street reverts to bi-directional traffic at 8th Avenue on the north side of the Washington State Convention Center and continues northeast. The street then passes the Paramount Theatre and the former site of Convention Place station at 9th Avenue and continues to an intersection with Boren Avenue that sits over Interstate 5. Pine Street turns due east as it enters Capitol Hill, passing apartment buildings and local restaurants as it climbs the hill. The street intersects Broadway on the south side of the Seattle Central College campus and Cal Anderson Park, becoming East Pine Street. The continuous section of Pine Street ends beyond 16th Avenue, where the road dives southeast to intersect Madison Street.

East Pine Street resumes at 17th Avenue adjacent to a trio of television antennas on the north side of Cherry Hill. The street travels east through a predominantly residential area with several small traffic circles, crossing into Madrona after intersecting Martin Luther King Jr. Way. The street ends at 37th Avenue and continues east down a public staircase and bridge, ultimately terminating at 40th Avenue a block west of Lake Washington Boulevard.

== History ==
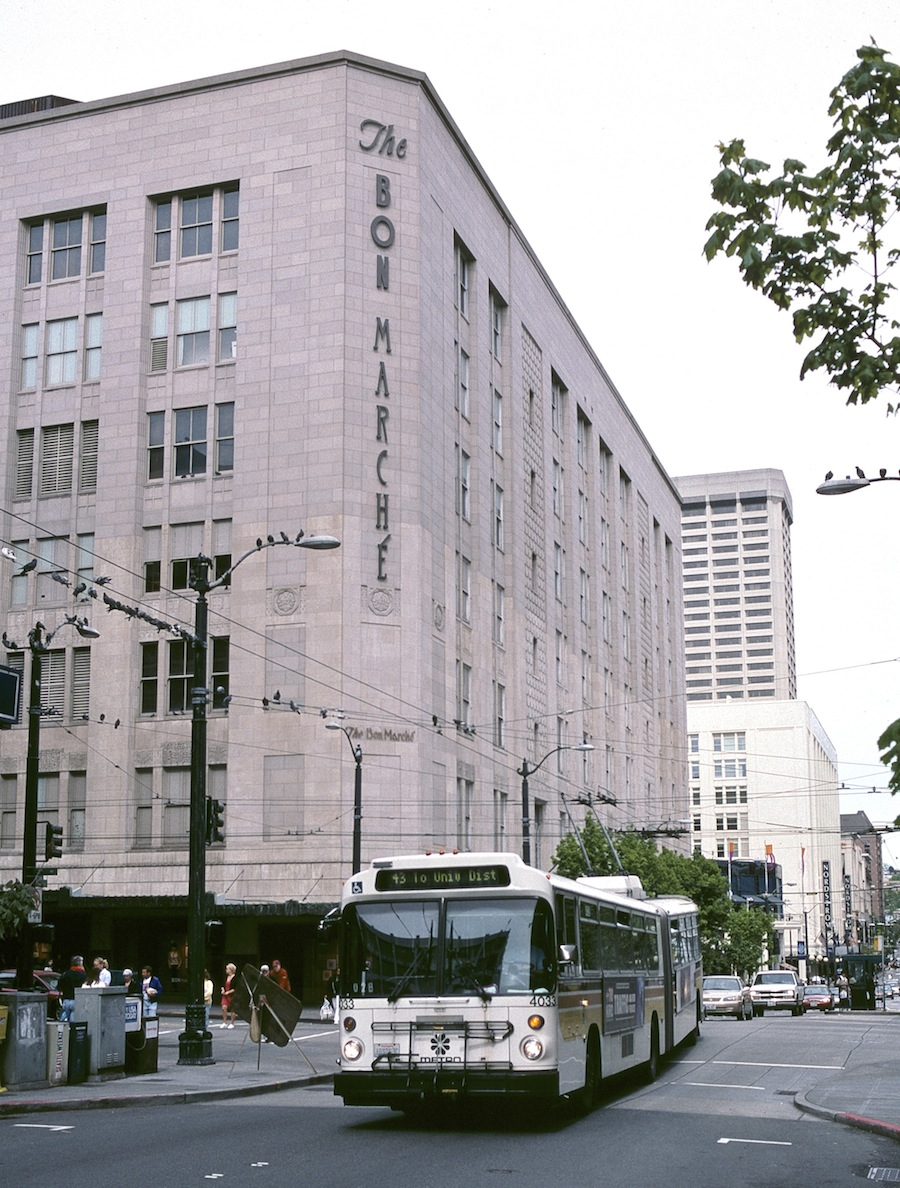
Looking east on Pine Street from 3rd Avenue, 2000

Pine Street was named by Arthur A. Denny in his Third Addition plat, which was filed on April 5, 1869. The section between 7th Avenue in Downtown Seattle and Boylston Avenue on Capitol Hill was regraded between 1907 and 1909 to improve its accessibility and increase the value of nearby property. The regrading was also used to bury several sections of old boardwalks that were later unearthed during tunnel construction in 2005 and 2011. A section of East Pine Street was known by various names, including Gould, Mastick, and Warren streets, prior to a 1895 realignment of street names in the city.

A downtown section of Pine Street between 4th and 9th avenues was closed on April 27, 1987, for construction of the Downtown Seattle Transit Tunnel. The cut-and-cover tunnel under Pine Street included Westlake and Convention Place stations and cost $74.5 million to construct. Excavation was completed in August 1987 and the street was temporarily backfilled to reopen to traffic for the Christmas shopping season at the request of downtown merchants. Pine Street was fully re-opened to traffic on November 1, 1988, coinciding with the opening of Westlake Center and Westlake Park. The mezzanine level of Westlake station, running under two blocks of Pine Street, was opened on August 11, 1989, while the tunnel opened for bus traffic in September 1990.

A one-block section of Pine Street between 4th and 5th avenues was converted into a pedestrian zone in July 1989, after the city government began repairing decorative paving stones that were installed at Westlake Park and damaged by heavy traffic. The Seattle City Council had previously voted in 1988 to keep Pine Street open to all traffic, at the urging of the Downtown Seattle Association, but reconsidered a permanent closure after the repairs began. Outgoing mayor Charles Royer ordered that Pine Street remained a permanent pedestrian zone, but councilmember and mayor-elect Norm Rice led a 5–4 majority of the city council in supporting a reopening plan. Rice later endorsed the pedestrian zone and also rejected a proposal to allow trolleybuses to use the block.

The renovation of the vacated Frederick & Nelson flagship store for Nordstrom in the mid-1990s re-ignited the Pine Street debate. The company made the re-opening of the block a key demand in its renovation proposal, which was of high priority for the city government. A city-commissioned study found that the closed block on Pine Street had made no difference in traffic congestion around Downtown Seattle, due to mitigation measures in other areas to accommodate a 6 percent increase in automobile traffic. The city council endorsed the re-opening plan but placed a ballot measure for the March 14, 1995, election to decide the issue. The ballot measure to re-open Pine Street passed with 60 percent in favor across the city amid a higher than usual voter turnout. The one-block section of Pine Street was reopened on January 6, 1997, with one lane of through traffic and a widened mid-block crosswalk.

A three-block section of Pine Street near the Seattle Police Department's East Precinct on Capitol Hill was closed during the June 2020 George Floyd protests. After several days of demonstrations, the precinct was vacated and the blocked section of Pine Street was occupied by demonstrators as part of the Capitol Hill Autonomous Zone (later Capitol Hill Occupied Protest). On June 11, a mural reading "Black Lives Matter" was painted on a block-long section of Pine Street between 10th and 11th avenues, which was renamed "Black Lives Matter Way" by demonstrators. The protest zone was dismantled on July 1, 2020, and was replaced by a police barricade from Broadway to the East Precinct. Pine Street was reopened to traffic three days later with barriers on surrounding streets. A permanent version of the mural was painted in October 2020 with recessed letters.

In February 2023, SDOT and the Downtown Seattle Association began construction of a major redesign of Pine and Pike streets in Downtown Seattle. As part of the project, Pine Street will carry one-way westbound traffic over Interstate 5 and the protected bicycle lane on the street will be extended across the overpass. The bicycle lane was extended across Westlake Park in September 2024.

== Transit service ==
Pine Street is a major transit corridor in Downtown Seattle that is used by several King County Metro bus routes. Routes 10 and 12 use Pine Street between 2nd Avenue and Capitol Hill. Route 49 runs on Pine Street from 4th Avenue to Broadway, turning north towards the University District. In addition to these routes, the 2nd Avenue to Bellevue Avenue section of Pine Street is used by routes 3 and 11. Sound Transit's Link light rail system stops under Pine Street at Westlake station, which has several entrances between 3rd and 5th avenues. The Seattle Center Monorail terminates at Westlake Center on the north side of Pine Street, but had a terminal that spanned the street until 1986.
