= List of government corporations of the United States =

Government corporations are chartered by the United States federal government "to serve a public function of a predominantly business nature." There is no official definition of a United States government corporation. They are distinct from Government State Enterprises, which function as quasi governmental entities.

This list includes both current and former corporations.

- African Development Foundation
- AmeriCorps
- Commodity Credit Corporation
- Community Development Financial Institutions Fund
- Export-Import Bank of the United States
- Federal Crop Insurance Corporation
- Federal Deposit Insurance Corporation
- Federal Financing Bank
- Federal Housing Administration
- Federal Prison Industries, Inc.
- Government National Mortgage Association
- National Credit Union Administration Central Liquidity Facility
- National Railroad Passenger Corporation (Amtrak)
- Overseas Private Investment Corporation
- Pennsylvania Avenue Development Corporation
- Pension Benefit Guaranty Corporation
- Presidio Trust of San Francisco
- Resolution Funding Corporation
- Resolution Trust Corporation
- Rural Telephone Bank
- St. Lawrence Seaway Development Corporation
- Tennessee Valley Authority
- The Financing Corporation
- United States Enrichment Corporation
- United States Postal Service
- United States Railway Association
- Valles Caldera Trust
