= Northwest Flower and Garden Show =

- Status: Active
- Genre: Festival
- Date: 1989
- Frequency: Annually
- Venue: Washington State Convention Center
- Locations: Seattle, Washington
- Country: US
- Founder: Duane Kelly
- Attendance: 60,000-65,000
- Organizer: Marketplace Events
- Website: gardenshow.com

The Northwest Flower & Garden Show (also known as the Northwest Flower & Garden Festival) is an annual exhibition of horticulture and gardening held in Seattle, Washington, for five days each February. It is the largest garden show west of Philadelphia and is regarded as the second largest garden show in the country. It is held at the Washington State Convention Center, and has been since the first year. The show has lush, fully built display gardens (which are judged for awards), over 90 educational and entertaining seminars, and a garden marketplace exclusively for plants, gardening supplies, botanical art, – the largest Marketplace of any garden show in the U.S.

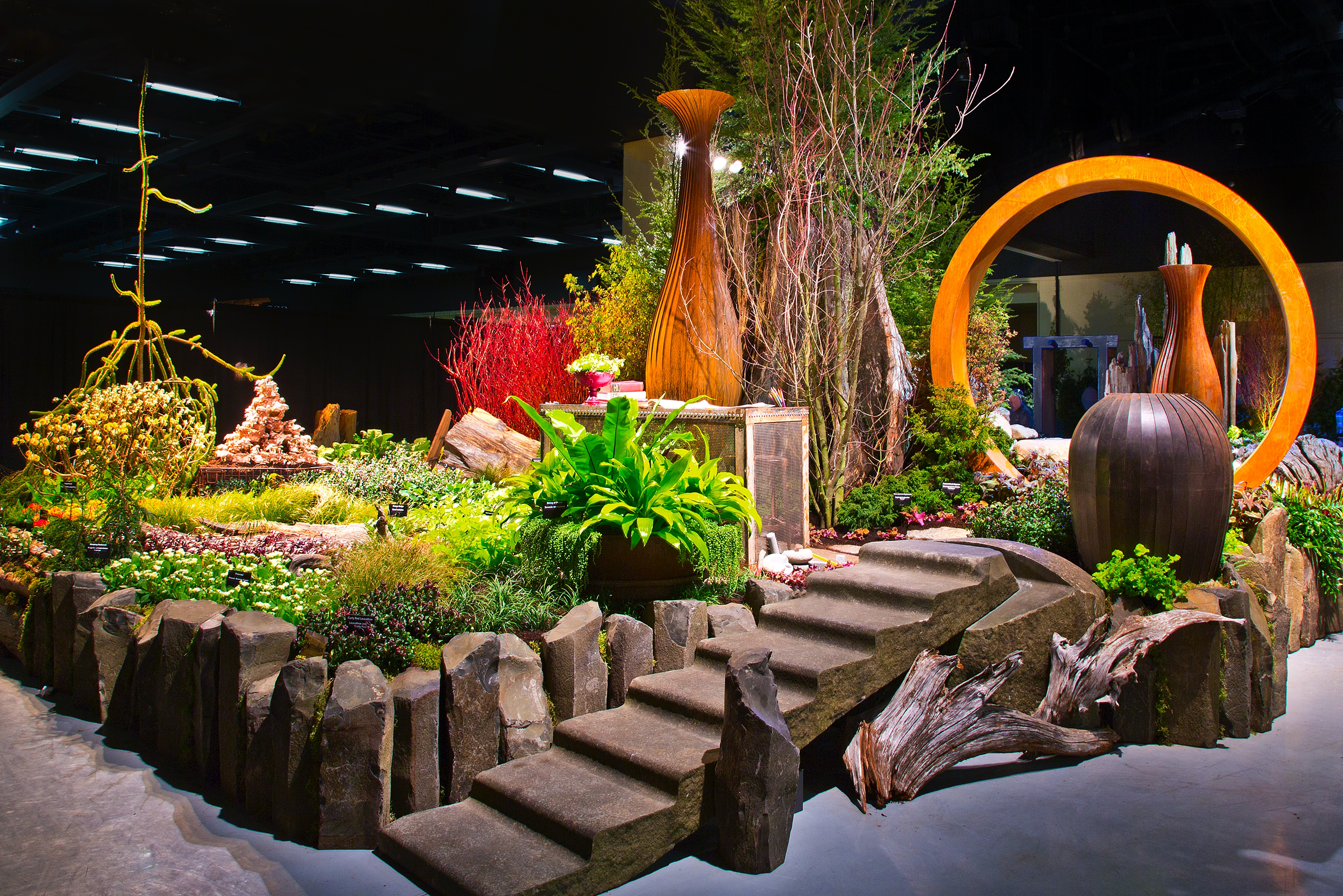
2014 Northwest Flower & Garden Show display created by WALP and WSNLA

The Northwest Flower & Garden Show serves the Western Region of North America from Alaska and Vancouver, BC to San Francisco, California, with visitors coming from 15 to 20 states a year. Attendance has ranged from 55,000 to 60,000. The show runs from Wednesday through Sunday, and is typically held in February. There are three main components: approximately 20 display gardens built in three days; over 350 exhibitors selling high quality garden-related products, and over 90 free seminars on three stages, including a do-it-yourself demo stage.

The show's 65-75 seminar speakers include garden writers, authors and garden design experts from around the US, Canada, and UK. The show also has 10 City Living balcony gardens, an Ikebana display, and a floral competition. There is a live reality show held daily in front of show audiences which has friendly competition and education. "Container Wars" challenges two designers to create three lush planted containers in under an hour.

In 2020 Better Homes & Gardens magazine rated the Northwest Flower & Garden Festival as the #1 garden show in the U.S.

== History ==
The show was started in 1989 by Duane and Alice Kelly, remaining in the downtown Seattle Washington State Convention Center ever since. It was the first large public event ever held at the Convention Center. Duane Kelly said he was inspired to start the show by his visits the mid-1980s to the large flower shows in Philadelphia and Boston, and by his own interest for gardening and the theater. Portland-based O'Loughlin Trade Shows took over production after buying the show from Duane Kelly in 2009. Ohio-based Marketplace Events acquired the show in June 2018.

== Awards ==
=== Display Gardens ===
Gold, Silver, or bronze medals are presented to the display gardens by a panel of three judges. The show has other special awards that are given to display gardens by various judges:

- Founder's Cup (Best in Show) - Garden that is deemed "Best in Show" and a majority favorite of all the judges for the other awards.
- American Horticultural Society Environmental award - Garden that best demonstrates the bond between horticulture and the environment.
- Ethel Moss People's Choice Award - Favorite garden as voted by the public.
- Fred Palmer Garden Creator's Award - Garden voted the most accomplished by fellow garden creators.
- Fine Gardening Magazine award - Garden that best balances the ideals of inspiration and attainability.
- Best Use of Horticulture Award - Garden that best incorporates plants incorporating color, texture, size and shape to enhance the garden's theme.
- Professional's Choice Award - Garden that best demonstrates excellence in design concepts, horticulture, and quality of execution reflecting the highest level of workmanship.
- Best Use of Natural Stone - Marenakos Rock Center Award
- GardenComm Award - Garden that exhibits the most beautiful, creative and educational ideas to encourage effective use of horticulture and design for functional outdoor living environments.

=== Floral Competition and City Living ===
The Floral Competition is judged by floral professionals for first, second, and third place, along with a People's Choice Award voted by the public.

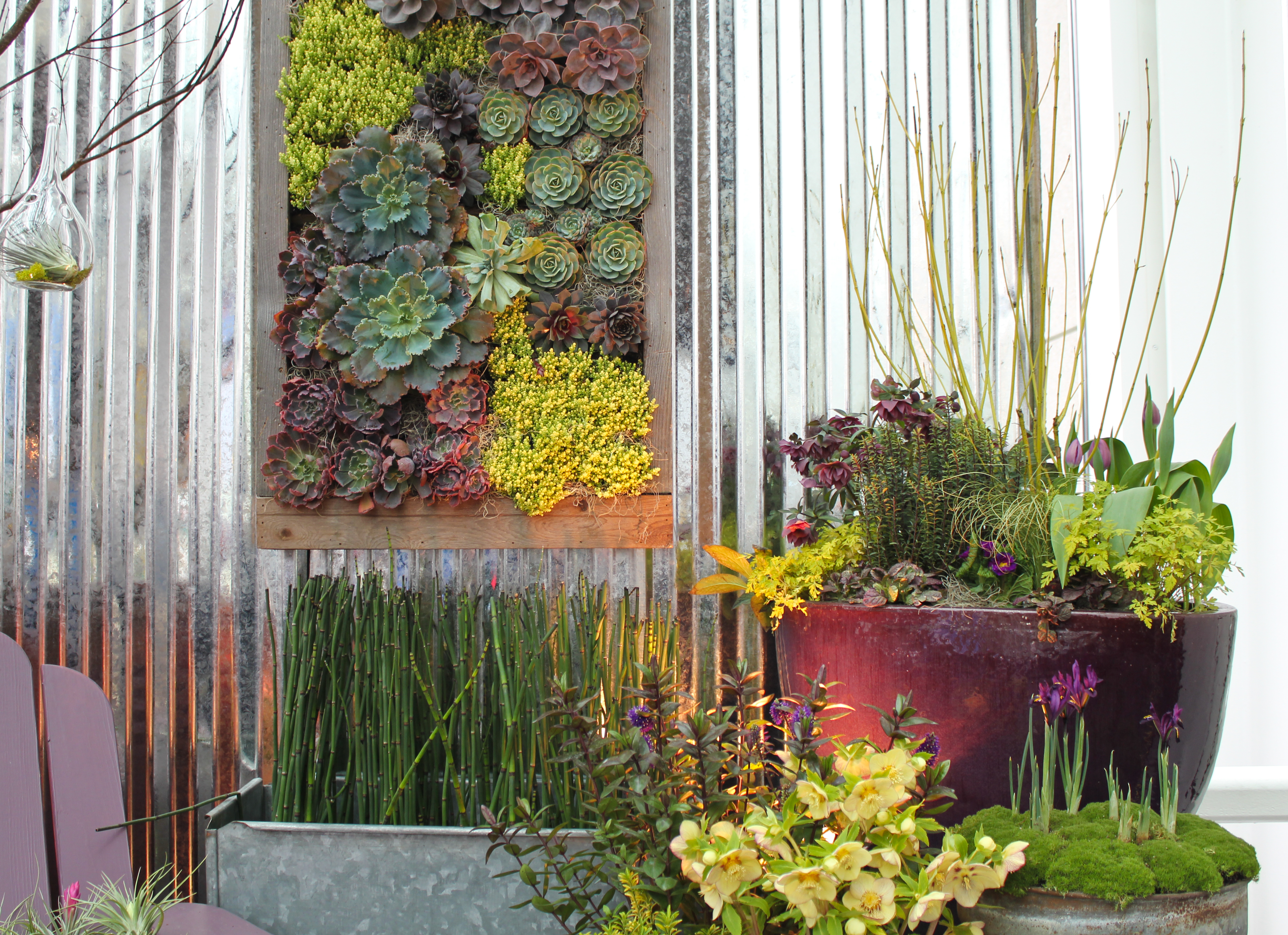
2011 Northwest Flower & Garden Show City Living by Ravenna Gardens.

The City Living display awards are:

- Best Plant Material
- Best Design
- People's Choice Award
