= CHG International =

American real estate company

CHG International was an American real estate developer that rose to prominence in the 1980s, primarily in Seattle, Washington. The company was formed in 1971 by Henry Griffin and Clint Hergert and began buying up property in Downtown Seattle in 1976. By 1980, the company had become the largest landowner in Downtown Seattle, with more than 40 properties valued at $1.4 billion.

CHG signed a development agreement with the Washington State Convention Center in 1983 to fund private development at the proposed convention center, in exchange for air rights on several downtown parcels. The deal collapsed in December 1984, when CHG filed for bankruptcy after its primary lender, Westside Federal Savings and Loan, backed out. The state government eventually bought out CHG's share of the development agreement.
