= Resolution Funding Corporation =

American government-sponsored enterprise

The Resolution Funding Corporation (RefCorp) is a United States off-budget government corporation that provided funds to the Resolution Trust Corporation (RTC), a government-owned asset management corporation to finance the bailout of savings and loan associations after the savings and loan crisis of the 1980s. It provided funding from 1989 to 1991 through issuing approximately $30 billion of noncallable, zero coupon long-term bonds, the last of which will mature on April 15, 2030. It is exempt from federal income taxation under section 501(c)(1).

Established by the United States Congress in the summer of 1989 as part of the Financial Institutions Reform, Recovery, and Enforcement Act of 1989, RefCorp's funding was used to purchase capital certificates issued by the RTC or to refund previous obligations. Its bonds were distinct from agency bonds from other government corporations like Fannie Mae or Freddie Mac in that their principal was fully collateralized by Treasury bonds and payment of their coupons was guaranteed by the Treasury. It was originally under the oversight of the Thrift Depositor Protection Oversight Board before being transferred to the authority of the Secretary of the Treasury in late October 1998.

In mid-July 2011, the twelve Federal Home Loan Banks fulfilled their obligation to contribute toward RefCorp's interest payments. They were initially required to pay $300 million per year toward the RefCorp bonds, but since 1999, they were required to pay 20 percent of their net earnings toward the debt (after payments to the Affordable Housing Program). As of 2026, the U.S. Department of the Treasury has provided for the payment of interest on REFCORP's remaining long-term obligations.

== See also ==
- Financing Corporation (FICO)
