= Financing Corporation =

The Financing Corporation (FICO) was a federally established mixed-ownership corporation that assumed all the assets and liabilities of the insolvent Federal Savings and Loan Insurance Corporation (FSLIC) and operated as a financing vehicle for the FSLIC Resolution Fund (FRF) after the former was abolished by the Financial Institutions Reform, Recovery, and Enforcement Act of 1989 (FIRREA).

== History ==
FICO was chartered by the Federal Home Loan Bank Board pursuant to the FSLIC Recapitalization Act of 1987. FICO's sole purpose was for issuing bonds to finance a rebuilding of the Federal Savings and Loan Insurance Corporation (FSLIC), and after FIRREA to function as a financing vehicle for the FSLIC Resolution Fund (FRF) that succeeded the FSLIC. Pursuant to the Recapitalization Act, FICO was authorized to issue debentures, bonds, and other obligations subject to limitations, the net proceeds of which were to be used solely to purchase capital certificates issued by the FSLIC Resolution Fund, or to refund any previously issued obligations. The Resolution Trust Corporation Refinancing, Restructuring, and Improvement Act of 1991 terminated FICO's borrowing authority. By that time FICO had issued bonds for $8.2 billion with fixed maturities of 30 years.

After FIRREA, FICO bond payments came from Federal Deposit Insurance Corporation (FDIC) Savings Association Insurance Fund (SAIF) premiums instead of FSLIC premiums. The FICO bond obligation was extended to state and national banks under the Deposit Insurance Funds Act of 1996. FICO made its final bond payments in September 2019 and began dissolution the following month.

== See also ==
- Resolution Funding Corporation (REFCORP)
