= Federal Savings and Loan Insurance Corporation =

Agency overview
- Formed: June 27, 1934
- Dissolved: October 8, 1989
- Superseding agency: Federal Deposit Insurance Corporation
- Parent agency: Federal Home Loan Bank Board
- Key document: National Housing Act of 1934

The Federal Savings and Loan Insurance Corporation (FSLIC) was an institution that administered deposit insurance for savings and loan institutions in the United States.

== History ==
=== Establishment ===
The FSLIC was established by the National Housing Act of 1934, which was signed into law by President Franklin D. Roosevelt on June 27, 1934. Upon the creation of the FSLIC, it was assigned a capital stock of $100,000,000. All federal savings and loan associations were required to apply for insurance through the FSLIC; other building and loan associations whose capital was not impaired were also allowed to apply. The FSLIC was given certain regulatory powers over insured institutions, requiring each institution to accumulate reserves over several years. FSLIC assessed an annual insurance premium, which was calculated as 0.25% of the total amount of all accounts of insured shareholders or members, plus any creditor obligations. The FSLIC would suspend insurance premiums whenever the FSLIC's reserve fund was greater or equal to 5% of all insured accounts and creditor obligations of all insured institutions. The FSLIC was administered by the Federal Home Loan Bank Board (FHLBB).

=== Insolvency ===
In the 1980s, during the savings and loan crisis, the FSLIC became insolvent. It was recapitalized with taxpayer money several times, with $15 billion in 1986 and $10.75 billion in 1987; however, by 1989 it was too insolvent to save. Pursuant to the Financial Institutions Reform, Recovery, and Enforcement Act of 1989 (FIRREA), the FSLIC was abolished along with the FHLBB, and the FSLIC savings and loan deposit insurance responsibility was transferred to the FDIC. The FSLIC Resolution Fund (FRF) was created to assume all the assets and liabilities of the FSLIC, which was to be funded by the Financing Corporation (FICO).

=== Abolishment ===
The Financial Institutions Reform, Recovery, and Enforcement Act of 1989 (FIRREA) abolished the FSLIC, and it transferred the responsibility for savings and loan deposit insurance to the Federal Deposit Insurance Corporation (FDIC). The FSLIC Resolution Fund (FRF) was created to assume all the assets and liabilities of the FSLIC, which was to be funded by the Financing Corporation (FICO). As of 2020 the FDIC continued to administer the FRF, which has paid off the FICO debt but still collects money due from court judgments and terminated receiverships.
