= Pacific Place (Seattle) =

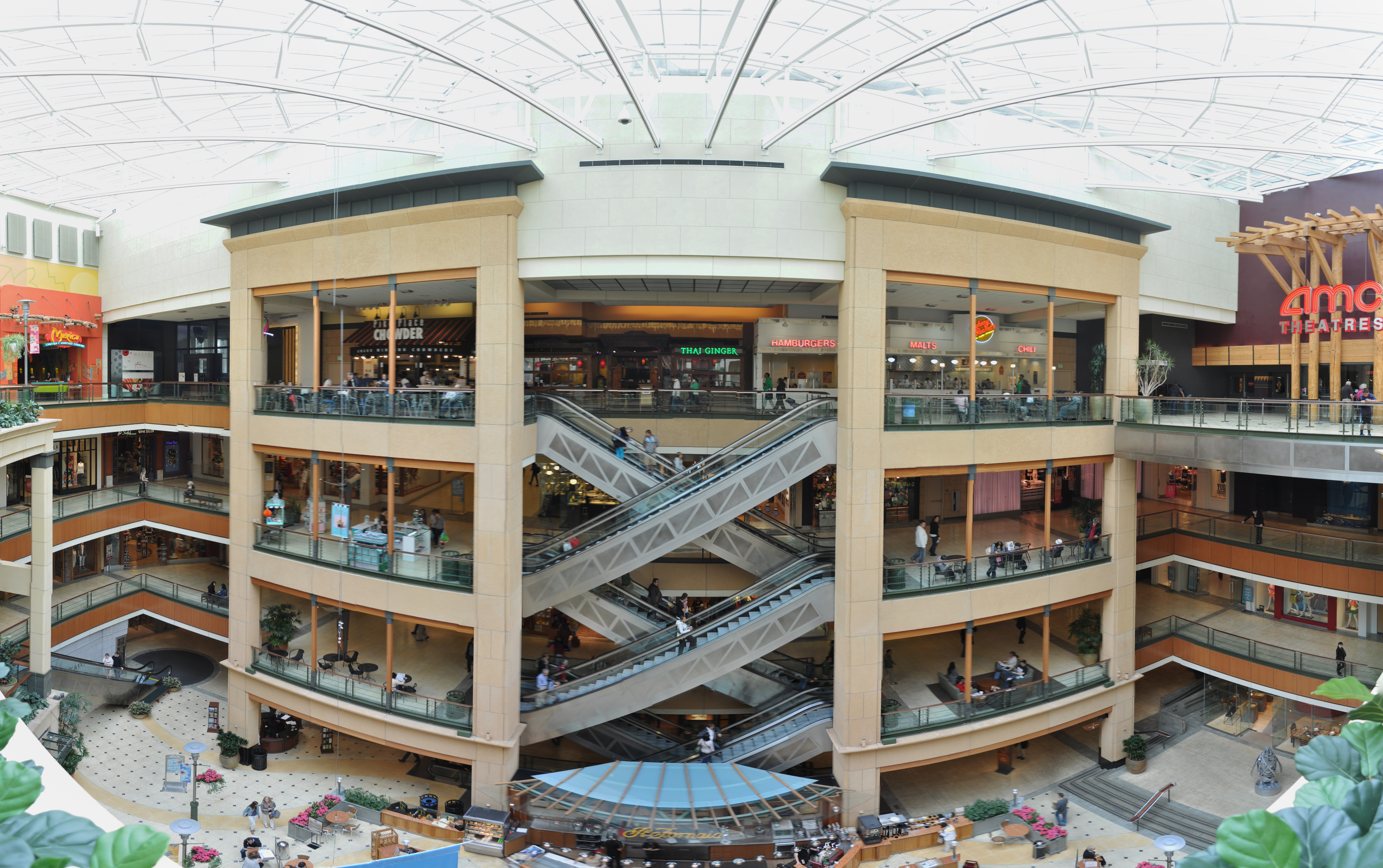
- Panorama of the interior in 2012
- Location: Seattle, Washington, U.S.
- Coordinates: 47°36′45″N 122°20′07″W
- Opened: October 29, 1998
- Developer: Pine Street Group L.L.C.
- Manager: Avison Young
- Owner: BH Properties
- Architect: NBBJ
- Num. of anchor tenants: 3
- Floor area: 335,000 square feet (31,100 m^{2})
- Floors: 5
- Parking: Underground parking garage
- Website: pacificplaceseattle.com

Pacific Place is an upscale shopping center in downtown Seattle, Washington, United States. Opened on October 29, 1998, it is located at 6th Avenue and Pine Street and has a total area of 335,000 square feet (31,100 m^{2}). It has five floors, the uppermost of which features an 11-screen AMC Theatre (formerly General Cinema) and various restaurants. Pacific Place also features a skybridge that connects it to Seattle's Nordstrom flagship.

== History ==
The site of Pacific Place is on a block bounded by Sixth Avenue, Seventh Avenue, Olive Way, and Pine Street. The corner of Seventh Avenue and Olive Way was the site of the Electric Building, a six-story brick building constructed in 1909 as the headquarters for the Seattle Electric Company. Opposite it on the corner of Sixth Avenue and Olive Way was the site of the Seattle terminal for the Pacific Northwest Traction Company's Seattle-Everett interurban rail system; it was owned by Seattle Electric Company's successor, Puget Sound Power and Light, until it was sold in 1926 to a local investor. The site had become home to a parking lot and a gas station by November 1943, when the Standard Oil Company of California acquired the property and announced plans for a three-level underground parking garage with a car capacity of 450 the following January; the combined parking garage and gas station opened on June 6, 1947. In 1951, department store chain Frederick & Nelson reached an agreement with Puget Sound Power and Standard Oil to purchase the garage immediately while intending to purchase the Electric Building by 1961; Frederick & Nelson then announced a new six-level parking garage for its flagship store across Sixth Avenue in April 1953, intending to incorporate the existing garage into the new structure. The garage, which required an alley vacation between Sixth Avenue and Seventh Avenue, broke ground in May 1954 and was completed by the following year. Meanwhile, Frederick & Nelson consummated its purchase of the Electric Building in December 1956, at which point Puget Power moved its offices to the then-new Puget Power Building in Bellevue. While the Electric Building served as a temporary library for Downtown Seattle from March 1957 to April 1960 during construction of the second iteration of the Seattle Central Library, it was essentially abandoned afterwards and remained disused until its demolition in October 1970.

An upscale shopping mall on the block was proposed in 1993 as part of a series of downtown improvements along Pine Street led by the renovation of the Frederick & Nelson building into Nordstrom's flagship store. Pacific Place took two years to construct and opened on October 29, 1998, with 40 stores and a 1,200-stall parking garage. The mall was developed by Pine Street Development, which included investment from local businessmen Jeff Brotman, John McCaw, and Howard Schultz, as well as saxophonist Kenny G.

=== Construction loan ===
In a 1998 article by Mark Worth, the Seattle Weekly revealed that consultants linked to Pacific Place developer Jeff Rhodes had secured a $47 million low-interest loan to help build a for-profit parking garage beneath the mall. The loan was obtained through the Washington State Housing Finance Commission, a government agency whose mission is to support low-income housing and other needy projects. The parking garage also served the Nordstrom flagship store across the street.

=== Renovation and later history ===
On July 14, 2014, Pacific Place was sold for $271 million to Madison Marquette, a Washington, D.C.–based commercial real estate company. In September 2016, Madison Marquette completed the purchase of the Pacific Place parking garage from the City of Seattle for $87 million.

A redevelopment of the mall was announced in March 2017 to expand space for shops and remodel the common areas. After over two years of redevelopment, Pacific Placed reopened in June 2020 with 12 open tenants due to the effects of the COVID-19 pandemic on Downtown Seattle. Throughout 2021, small independent shops and art non-profits have utilized vacancy spaces for business and artistic activities. Madison Marquette announced that it would transfer management of the mall to Avison Young in January 2024. Pacific Place and its garage were sold to BH Properties in May 2024 for $88.25 million due to the mall's retail vacancies.

Pacific Place was designated as an official watch party venue for the 2026 FIFA World Cup by the local Seattle committee and underwent renovations to add amenities. The venue, named "Seattle Soccer House", comprised an events space on the second floor of the mall with a bar, play area, and pop-up vendors. The atrium became the primary viewing space with a large screen measuring 70 by 40 feet (21 by 12 m) that faces the four floors and showed all of the tournament's matches. An official FIFA store was opened on the first floor with memorabilia and apparel for teams playing in Seattle.

== Tenants ==
As of 2024, the four-story mall has 21 active businesses. Its major tenants include an AMC Theatres multiplex on its top floor, a food court, Din Tai Fung, and Haidilao. A Barnes & Noble bookstore formerly occupied the ground floor until 2020.
