= Street vacation =

Transfer of street right-of-way to private entity

A street vacation, also known as an alley vacation or vacation of public access, is a type of easement in which a government transfers the right-of-way of a public street, highway or alley to a private property owner. The process, which varies between cities and states in the United States, is often used for large-scale real estate development, where alleys cutting through city blocks are closed for a large building. City laws may require public benefits and other types of compensation in exchange for the approval of a street vacation.

== Examples ==
=== Alaska ===
In the Unorganized Borough of Alaska, vacation of public access easements require approval from the Alaska Department of Natural Resources.

=== California ===
The city of Los Angeles requires a $14,980 fee paid to the Los Angeles Bureau of Engineering to begin the process of review for street vacations. The process includes a public investigation, environmental review, actions from the Los Angeles City Council, and public hearings before they can be accepted.

=== Oregon ===
In Portland, Oregon, the street vacation process takes approximately 8 to 12 months and includes a formal petition and investigation, public hearings, and action and approval by the Portland City Council.

=== Washington ===
Right-of-way vacations in the state of Washington are governed by part of the Revised Code of Washington, allowing for local governments to set their own rules on the process.

In Seattle, the state's largest city, permanent street vacations require the approval of the Seattle City Council or its transportation committee after the consideration of land use impacts and public benefits provided by the requester.

In 2016, Amazon.com was required by the city council to allow 24-hour public access and a "free speech zone" on part of its new downtown headquarters campus in exchange for an alley vacation; other benefits include paying $3.4 million in fair market value for the alley, a public hill-climb, and bicycle lanes.

The threat of rejection of a street vacation for political reasons has also been used to halt projects in the Seattle area. In 2013, Mayor Mike McGinn's recommendation to deny a street vacation for Whole Foods to build a store in West Seattle delayed the project until an approved vacation the following year. The threat of a rejection in 2013 of an alley vacation for the Hyatt Regency Seattle, at the behest of a local hotel workers union, forced the developer to scale back the project, also dropping the proposed public benefit of affordable housing units. The development of a new basketball arena in Seattle was blocked by a denied street vacation in 2016, after concerns from the Port of Seattle over the street's freight use.

In 2017, a group of community activists in Seattle negotiated with the Washington State Convention Center to provide public benefits in exchange for a street vacation for its proposed expansion. The benefits package included $80 million in funds for affordable housing, improved public open spaces, and bicycling and pedestrian improvements.
