= Downtown Seattle Transit Tunnel =

Rail tunnel in Seattle, Washington, United States

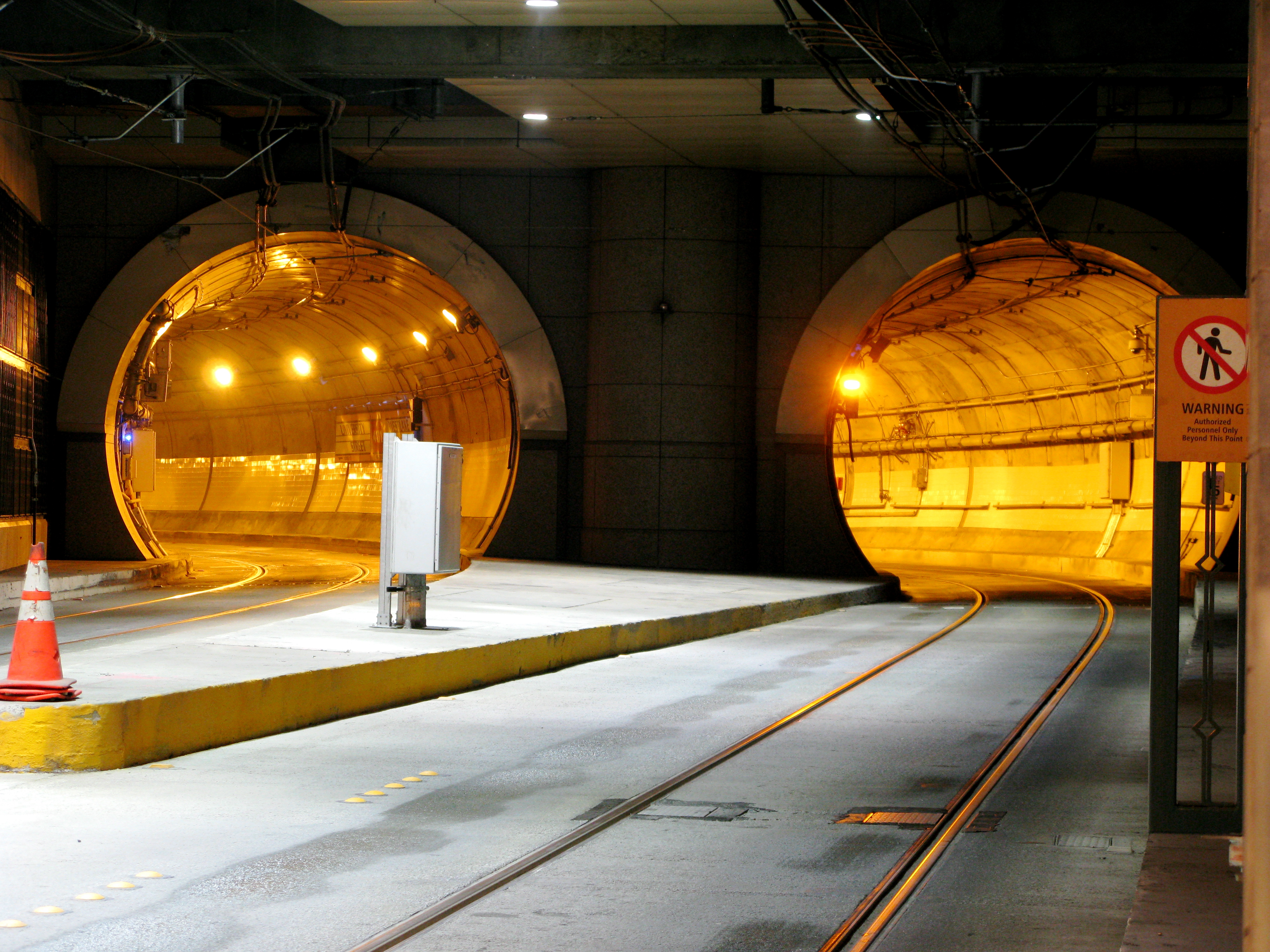
- The southbound portal at Westlake station

Overview
- Other name: Metro Bus Tunnel
- Line: 1 Line; 2 Line
- Location: Seattle, Washington, U.S.
- System: Link light rail
- Start: 5th Avenue and Pine Street
- End: 5th Avenue S and S Jackson Street
- No. of stations: 4

Operation
- Work began: March 6, 1987
- Opened: September 15, 1990
- Rebuilt: 2005–2007
- Reopened: September 24, 2007
- Owner: Sound Transit (2022–); King County Metro (1987–2022)
- Operator: Sound Transit
- Traffic: Light rail

Technical
- Length: 1.3 mi (2.1 km)
- No. of tracks: 2
- Track gauge: 4 ft 8 1/2 in (1,435 mm)
- Electrified: Overhead line, 1,500 V DC
- Operating speed: 30 mph (48 km/h)
- Width: 18 ft (5.5 m)

Route map
Key
Interactive map

The Downtown Seattle Transit Tunnel (DSTT), formerly also known as the Metro Bus Tunnel, is a 1.3-mile-long (2.1 km) pair of public transit tunnels in Seattle, Washington, United States. The double-track tunnel and its four stations serve Link light rail trains on the 1 Line and 2 Line as they travel through Downtown Seattle. The tunnel runs west under Pine Street from 9th Avenue to 3rd Avenue, and south under 3rd Avenue to South Jackson Street. The two light rail lines diverge at International District/Chinatown station to continue south on the 1 Line and east on the 2 Line.

The DSTT was used only by buses from its opening in 1990 until 2005, and shared by buses and light rail from 2009 until 2019. Bus routes from King County Metro and Sound Transit Express left the tunnel north via Interstate 5, south via the SODO Busway, or east via Interstate 90. It was owned by King County Metro and shared with Sound Transit through a joint-operating agreement signed in 2002; Sound Transit assumed full ownership in 2022. The Downtown Seattle Transit Tunnel was one of two tunnels in the United States shared by buses and trains, the other being the Mount Washington Transit Tunnel in Pittsburgh, and was the only one in the United States with shared stations.

Though proposals for a rapid transit tunnel under 3rd Avenue were introduced in the 1910s, 1920s and 1960s, planning for the modern bus and rail Metro Bus Tunnel only began in 1974. The King County Metro Council approved the bus tunnel proposal in November 1983, but construction did not begin until March 1987. The tunnel between Convention Place and Westlake stations was built using the cut-and-cover method, closing Pine Street for 19 months and disrupting access to the retail core. The segment from Westlake to the International District was bored with two tunnel-boring machines, heading north from Union Station and finishing within a month of each other. Tests of normal buses and the Breda dual-mode buses built specifically for tunnel routes began in March 1989; tunnel construction was declared complete in June 1990, at a cost of $469 million. Light rail tracks were installed in anticipation of future rapid transit service through the tunnel, but were later found to be poorly insulated and unusable for Link light rail. Soft openings and public previews of the five tunnel stations were held from August 1989 to September 1990, with regular bus service beginning on September 15, carrying 28,000 daily passengers in its first year of operation. For the next several years, until June 2004, service in the tunnel was provided exclusively by dual-mode buses, which ran as trolleybuses in the tunnel – like the city's extensive trolleybus system – and as diesel buses on surface streets and freeways.

The tunnel was closed on September 24, 2005, for modification to accommodate both buses and Sound Transit's Central Link (now the 1 Line) light rail trains with shared lanes and platforms. The roadway was lowered by 8 inches (20 cm) and other improvements were made to prepare for light rail service. New hybrid electric buses were moved into the tunnel to replace the Breda fleet, as the overhead wire was replaced for light rail trains. The tunnel reopened on September 24, 2007, and light rail service began on July 18, 2009. A stub tunnel, branching from the main tunnel, was constructed under Pine Street to allow light rail trains to stop and reverse direction; it was later used as the first segment of a light rail extension to Capitol Hill and the University of Washington that opened in 2016. Convention Place station was closed permanently on July 21, 2018, to make way for an expansion of the Seattle Convention Center that would also restrict bus access to the tunnel. On March 23, 2019, bus service in the tunnel ceased and its remaining seven routes were moved to surface streets.

== Route and stations ==
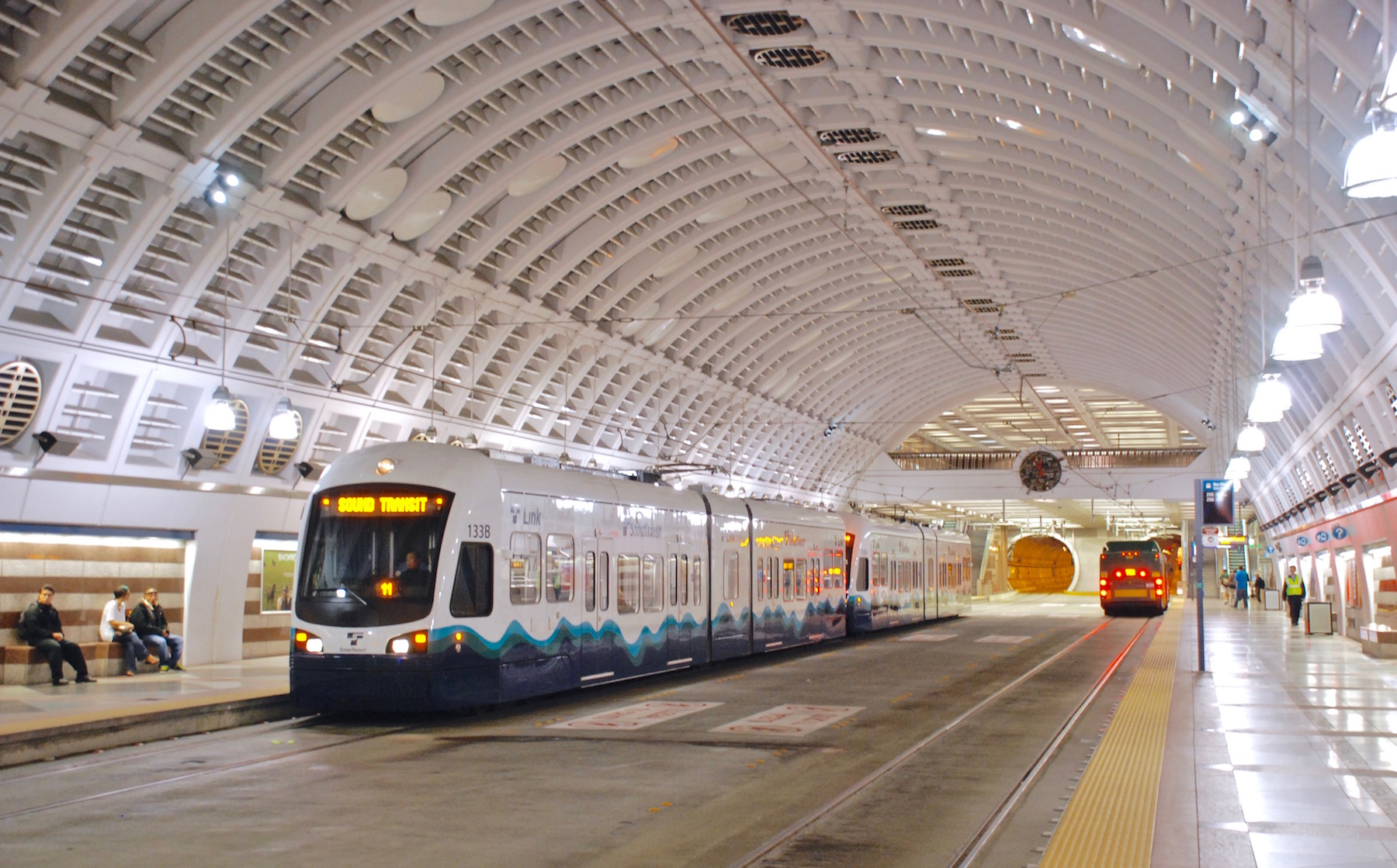
Pioneer Square station, located near the tunnel's southern end

The 1.3-mile-long (2.1 km), 18-foot-diameter (5.5 m) tunnel is used by the 1 Line and 2 Line between Westlake and International District/Chinatown stations. Entrances at several tunnel stations are built into nearby buildings with variable-message signs over the stairs and elevators leading to the mezzanines. A total of 11 wheelchair-accessible elevators connect the tunnel stations to the surface. The deepest of the tunnel stations are 60 feet (18 m) below street level and consist of two side platforms, two tracks, and a former bus passing lane in the middle. Since 2019, the stations have also had signs with numbered exits to aid in rider wayfinding. As part of the city's public art program that began in 1973, the Downtown Seattle Transit Tunnel and its stations were furnished with $1.5 million (equivalent to $5 million in 2025 dollars) in artwork by 25 artists commissioned by King County Metro.

The northern portal, formerly accessible to buses at street level from Olive Way, and from Interstate 5 via an express lane ramp, was the former Convention Place station at the intersection of 9th Avenue and Pine Street near the Seattle Convention Center. Until its closure in 2018, Convention Place was the only bus-exclusive station in the tunnel, and consisted of four sheltered platforms in a sunken, open-air layover space below street level. Buses entered the tunnel from 9th Avenue and passed under the historic Camlin Hotel, before joining the University Link Tunnel used by light rail trains headed north for three blocks under Pine Street to Capitol Hill station.

The DSTT enters Westlake station under Pine Street between 3rd and 6th avenues, located between the Westlake Center shopping mall and Westlake Park. The station features a two-block-long mezzanine with exits to Pine Street and several retailers, including the Westlake Center, the former The Bon Marché flagship store, and the Nordstrom Building, as well as the former King County Metro customer service center. The area around the station is known as the Westlake Hub, with connections to the South Lake Union Streetcar and the Seattle Center Monorail as well as the King County Metro and Sound Transit buses. Leaving Westlake Station, the bored set of twin tunnels turn south under Century Square to follow 3rd Avenue and its transit mall through the central business district, parallel to the shoreline of Elliott Bay.

Three blocks south of Pine Street, buses and trains enter Symphony station, located between Union and Seneca streets adjacent to Benaroya Hall and 1201 Third Avenue in the financial district. The station has a split mezzanine, with entrances to 2nd Avenue and University Street accessible from the north half, and an entrance to Seneca Street from the south half. From Symphony, the tunnel continues under 3rd Avenue for five blocks, entering the Pioneer Square neighborhood and historic district. At this point, 3rd Avenue passes several of Seattle's skyscrapers, including the historic Seattle Tower, Safeco Plaza, the Fourth and Madison Building and the Wells Fargo Center. Within Symphony station, the tunnel passes over the century-old Great Northern Tunnel with a clearance of 15 feet (5 m).

Pioneer Square station is located between Cherry Street and Yesler Way, with four entrances to nearby streets and Prefontaine Place serving two mezzanines. The station serves the administrative centers of the Seattle and King County governments, located within walking distance of Seattle City Hall, the Seattle Municipal Tower, the King County Courthouse and the King County Administration Building, as well as other major buildings, including Smith Tower, Columbia Center and the Alaska Building. From Pioneer Square, the tunnel travels down a 5.5% grade to cross 4.5 feet (1.4 m) under the Great Northern Tunnel at a 45-degree angle near the intersection of 4th Avenue South and South Washington Street, briefly descending below sea level, before turning cardinal south into the International District neighborhood.

International District/Chinatown station, the southernmost tunnel station, is partially open-air and located immediately below a public plaza at Union Station. The station has connections to Amtrak and Sounder commuter rail at King Street Station a block to the west, accessible through the Weller Street Bridge, as well as the First Hill Streetcar on Jackson Street, stopping east of 5th Avenue South. Other attractions near the station include Lumen Field to the west and Uwajimaya a block to the southeast. South of the station, the light rail tracks and bus lanes were formerly separated by railway signals at an underground bus layover and staging area next to the tunnel comfort room for bus drivers. The southern portal of the tunnel is located under the intersection of Airport Way and 5th Avenue South at the western terminus of the former Interstate 90 express lanes for high-occupancy vehicles. Until bus operations ceased, southbound routes continued from the tunnel in separated lanes on the SODO Busway, while eastbound buses used a set of ramps that traveled onto the Interstate 90 express lanes. The ramps were retrofitted for the 2 Line, which began service in March 2026.

== Service ==
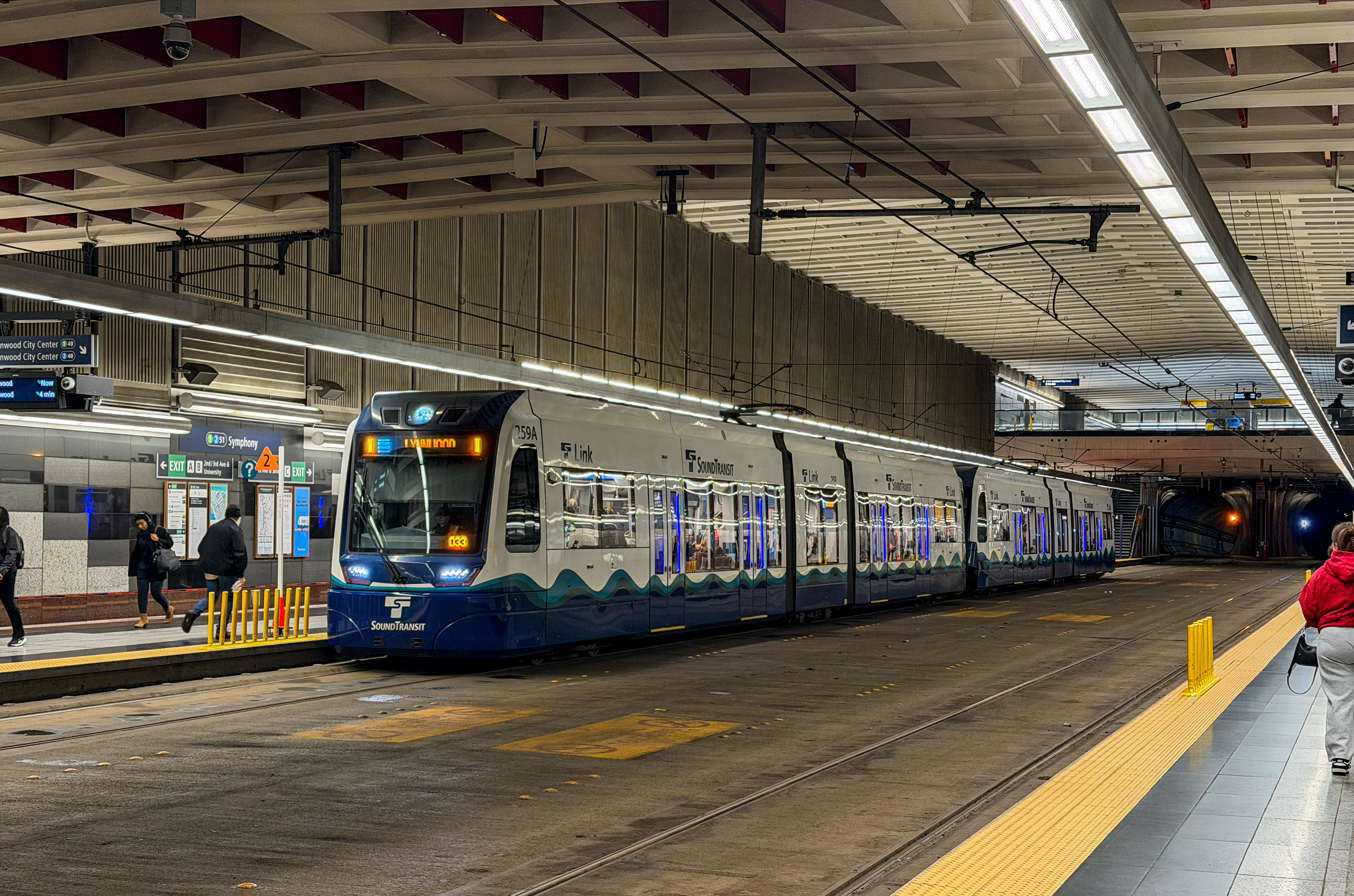
A 2 Line light rail train at Symphony station

The Downtown Seattle Transit Tunnel and the surface buses on 3rd Avenue comprise the "Third Avenue Transit Spine", the busiest transit corridor in Seattle. The tunnel's four stations served a total of 7,260,011 passengers in 2024 with a weekday average of 21,999 riders. The nearly 300 daily buses on the surface section of 3rd Avenue carried 52,400 daily passengers in 2022. The tunnel has a theoretical capacity of 40 trains per hour per direction with a minimum of 90-second headways, carrying 22,000 passengers per hour per direction, but is only able to carry 12,000 per hour per direction in 4-car light rail vehicles with current systems in place. Prior to the start of Link light rail service, the DSTT could serve up to 145 buses during the afternoon rush hour. During mixed operations in 2012, the tunnel carried 52,600 daily passengers, of which 10,000 were on light rail trains.

The tunnel carries a shared section of the 1 Line and 2 Line, which continue to other areas of King and Snohomish counties. Trains serve all downtown tunnel stations 20 hours a day every day; during regular weekday service, trains run roughly every 4 to 5 minutes during rush hour and midday operation, respectively, with longer headways of 15 minutes in the early morning and 20 minutes at night. During weekends, 1 Line and 2 Line trains arrive every 10 minutes during midday hours and every 15 minutes during mornings and evenings. Light rail service from Westlake to International District/Chinatown takes approximately seven minutes.

Prior to the cessation of bus service in March 2019, the DSTT was served by seven bus routes that stopped at all four tunnel stations as well as stops near the former Convention Place station. At each station, bus routes were divided into three bays labeled with their general direction. Bay A was served by three routes heading north toward Northgate and the University District and east to Kirkland via State Route 520; Bay C was served by three routes heading south through the SODO Busway toward the Rainier Valley and Renton; and Bay D was served by a single route, Sound Transit Express route 550, heading east to Mercer Island and Bellevue via Interstate 90.

During closures of the Downtown Seattle Transit Tunnel, tunnel buses were rerouted onto 2nd and 4th Avenues between Yesler Way and Pine Street, and Stewart Street and Olive Way between 2nd and Boren Avenues. Metro also runs a special route, the Route 97 Link Shuttle, between all Link light rail stations during service disruptions.

== Operations ==
The DSTT is open for 20 hours on weekdays and Saturdays, from 5:00 am to 1:00 am the following day, and for 18 hours on Sundays, from 6:00 am to midnight. At the time of its opening in 1990, the Metro Bus Tunnel only operated from 5:00 am to 7:00 pm on weekdays and 10:00 am to 6:00 pm on Saturdays, with no Sunday service; the operating hours were temporarily extended into weekday nights from 1998 to 2000 at the request of the Seattle Seahawks and Seattle Mariners, but were cut after the passage of Initiative 695 and subsequent loss of motor vehicle excise tax revenue. Preparations for Link light rail service restored late-night and full weekend hours for the tunnel, introduced in June 2009 after Sound Transit Express route 550 moved all of its trips into the tunnel.

Coordination between trains in the tunnel is managed by the Link Light Rail Operations Control Center (OCC), located at the King County Metro Communication and Control Center in SoDo. During joint operations, the OCC controlled vehicle movements by using on-board radio-frequency identification tags installed on tunnel buses and light rail vehicles, their locations tracked by passing over induction loops embedded in the tunnel roadway. Signals at each station indicated when a driver can proceed through the tunnel. The signaling system was replaced with the installation of automatic train protection in December 2025. Within the DSTT, speed limits are set at 15 miles per hour (24 km/h) in stations and staging areas and 30 miles per hour (48 km/h) between stations. During joint operations, light rail trains and buses were required to wait in the tunnels between stations until the platform was cleared of vehicles ahead; buses were mandated to keep a minimum of six seconds of separation between each other.

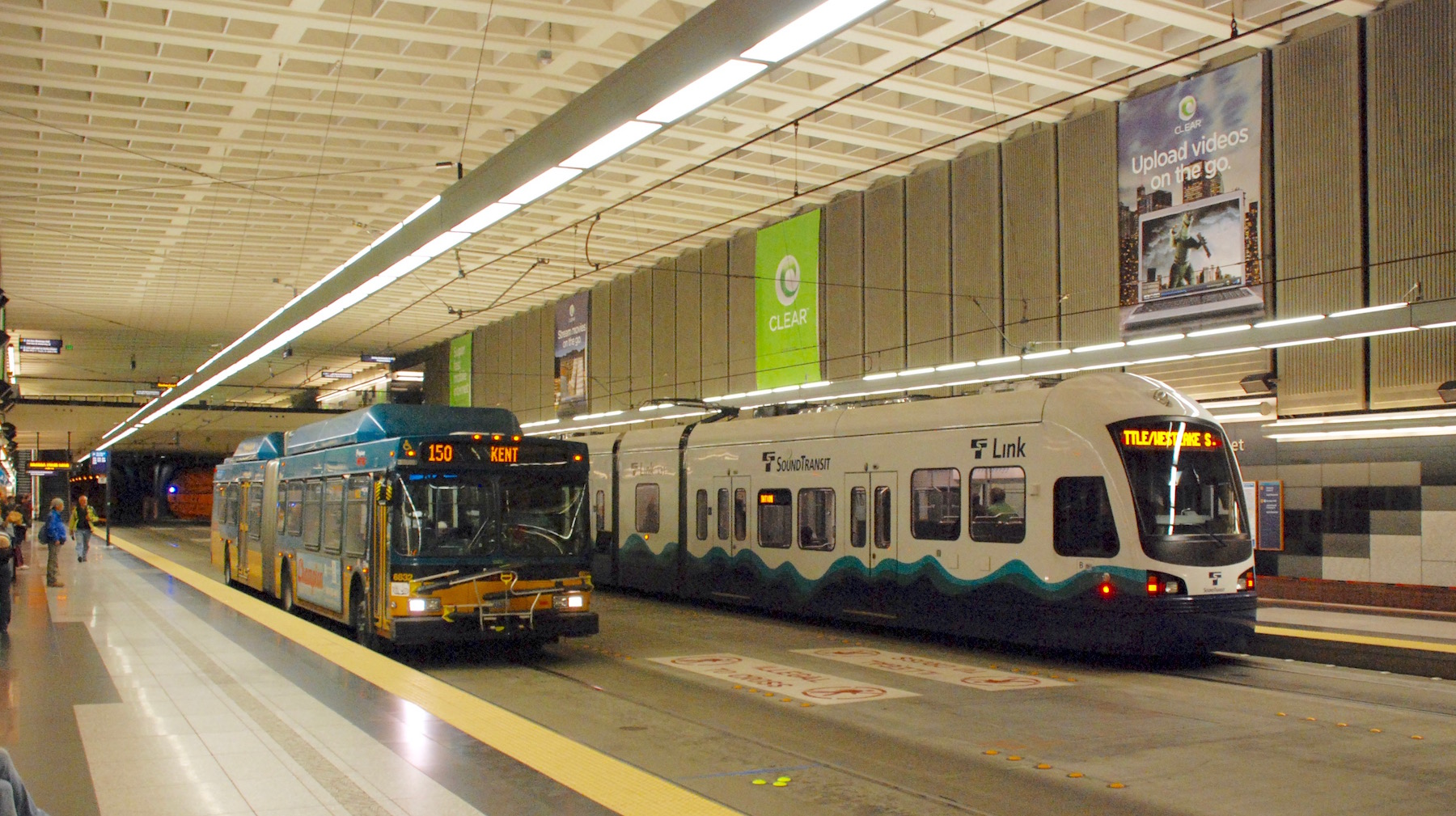
A King County Metro bus and Link light rail train at Symphony station, during joint bus–rail operations at tunnel stations

During joint bus–rail operations, two types of vehicles were used in the Downtown Seattle Transit Tunnel: Sound Transit's Kinkisharyo-Mitsui light rail vehicles and King County Metro's New Flyer diesel-electric hybrid buses. The New Flyer buses, dubbed "tunnel buses" by King County Metro, were ordered in 2004 to replace a fleet of Breda dual-mode electric trolleybuses whose overhead wire was to be removed in the tunnel's renovation for light rail; 59 of the dual-mode Breda coaches were converted into fully electric trolleybuses between 2004 and 2007 and moved to surface routes, where they continued to operate for more than a decade before being fully replaced in 2016. The New Flyer low-floor, 61-foot-long (19 m) articulated buses feature a "hush mode" that allowed buses to operate solely on stored electric power within the tunnel, minimizing emissions and noise.

== History ==
=== Previous subway proposals ===
Several proposals for a cut-and-cover subway tunnel under 3rd Avenue in Downtown Seattle were presented to the City of Seattle by predecessors of the Seattle Planning Commission throughout the 20th century. The first major proposal was part of urban planner Virgil Bogue's "Plan for Seattle" in 1911, as Route 1 of a proposed rapid transit network. Route 1 ran southeast on 3rd Avenue from a circular ring around a proposed civic center in the Denny Regrade neighborhood to King Street Station, paralleled to the west by a subway on 1st Avenue known as Route 17; stations on the line were to have additional entrances from department stores and other major businesses on 3rd Avenue. The plan was supported by City Engineer Reginald H. Thomson and the Municipal League among others, but opposed by businesses fearing it would shift the commercial district further north, and by the three daily newspapers published in Seattle. A special municipal election for the comprehensive plan was held on March 5, 1912, in which Seattle voters rejected it by a 10,000-vote margin.

Although Bogue's proposal was ultimately rejected, some elements of the plan were independently studied by others, including a rapid transit subway in Downtown Seattle. In 1920, City Engineer Arthur H. Dimmock published a report recommending a rapid transit system for the city of Seattle, centered around a cut-and-cover subway tunnel under 3rd Avenue from Virginia Street to Yesler Way. The line was to connect to surface and elevated lines at Dexter Avenue, Olive Way and South Jackson Street, serving the neighborhoods of Fremont, Eastlake, Capitol Hill, and North Delridge in West Seattle. The proposal, which was expected not to be acted upon for at least 15 years, gained little support, and was called a project of "purely academic interest" by Mayor Hugh M. Caldwell, who doubted that any rapid transit proposal would be seriously considered during his term. The Seattle City Planning Commission proposed its own rapid transit system in 1926, centered on an elevated line over Western Avenue with a possible parallel subway under 3rd Avenue from Yesler Way to Pike Street. The Seattle Traffic Research Commission published a report in 1928 recommending a subway under 2nd Avenue from King Street Station to Pike Street as part of a longer rapid transit line serving the University District and Fremont. In the late 1950s, the Seattle Transit Commission proposed building a rapid transit system on the right-of-way acquired for use by Interstate 5 between Tacoma, Seattle and Everett, with a two-station subway under 5th Avenue in Downtown Seattle.

The most significant rapid transit proposal came as part of the Forward Thrust initiatives of the late 1960s, which was centered around a downtown subway under 3rd Avenue. The subway would be fed by lines from Ballard, Lake City, the University District, Capitol Hill, Bellevue, and Renton, combining for a planned minimum headway of 1.5 minutes at rush hour, 2.5 minutes during midday, and five minutes at all other times. The stations on 3rd Avenue were to be situated at South Jackson Street and 5th Avenue South, James and Cherry streets, Seneca and Spring streets, and Pike and Pine streets, all planned to open by 1985 and operated by the Municipality of Metropolitan Seattle. Seattle voters were asked to provide $385 million (equivalent to $3.56 billion in 2025 dollars), to supplement a $765 million grant (equivalent to $7.08 billion in 2025 dollars) from the Urban Mass Transportation Administration (UMTA), during a municipal election on February 13, 1968, narrowly passing the bond by 50.8%, but falling short of the required 60 percent supermajority. A second attempt on May 19, 1970, with an adjusted $440 million local contribution (equivalent to $3.65 billion in 2025 dollars) and $881 million federal grant (equivalent to $7.3 billion in 2025 dollars), failed to pass with only 46% approval amid a local recession caused by layoffs at Boeing; the earmarked funds intended for the Forward Thrust rapid transit project were instead allocated to Atlanta, to build its rapid transit system.

=== Bus tunnel proposal and approval ===
The concept of a downtown bus tunnel was first proposed in 1974 during discussions between Governor Dan Evans and Seattle Mayor Wes Uhlman about regional transportation projects in response to the proposed extension of Interstate 90 into Seattle via a third floating bridge crossing Lake Washington. Metro Transit later commissioned a study into the bus tunnel, released the following July, which determined that it would not be able to adequately meet the rush hour demand of downtown bus ridership by 1980. The study suggested that a double-decked tunnel with automated guideway transit to complement bus service, running from Union Station to the Seattle Center, would be able to meet projected demand at an estimated cost of $450 million. Ultimately, the plan was rejected because of the high cost of ventilation for diesel buses that would use the tunnel.

The proposal resurfaced in 1979, outlining a tunnel from South Jackson Street to Pine Street that would carry 200 buses an hour in each direction at a cost of up to $350 million with the option of conversion for electric rail transit in the future. The tunnel was suggested by Metro officials and engineering consultants Parsons Brinckerhoff as a solution to worsening downtown traffic, and was better received than alternative concepts. The proposal gained further support from Metro Transit in its long-term "Metro 1990" plan, adopted in 1981, as a transit mall or tunnel under 3rd Avenue carrying buses that could be converted for a light rail system. The Puget Sound Council of Governments (PSCOG), a regional planning agency, endorsed Metro Transit's proposal and integrated the tunnel into its proposed light rail line connecting Seattle to Snohomish County.

The Metro Transit Committee debated the inclusion of the bus tunnel in the project's environmental impact assessment well into 1983, Seattle members opposing the tunnel in favor of a transit mall and suburban members supporting a bus tunnel that would be converted to a light rail system. On September 22, UMTA requested that a preferred alternative be declared by the end of November, which prompted the Metro Council to expedite its decision. Metro Council Executive Director Neil Peterson favored the tunnel alternative, while the Seattle City Council and Mayor Charles Royer preferred the transit mall, but stated that a tunnel would be a long-term solution to downtown congestion. The Seattle City Council reversed its decision on their preferred alternative, voting unanimously on October 17 in favor of an electric-only transit tunnel. Along with Mayor Royer, they were willing to compromise on Peterson's proposed dual-mode buses to serve suburban commuters where trolleybuses were not feasible. The Metro Council approved the downtown bus tunnel by a unanimous vote on November 3, 1983, estimating a cost of $300 million to build a five-station tunnel under 3rd Avenue and Pine Street to be completed in 1989 along with the conversion of 3rd Avenue into a landscaped transit mall.

=== Planning, funding and design ===
Metro unveiled its preliminary plans for the bus tunnel in January 1984, selecting five sites for stations along 3rd Avenue and Pine Street: at Union Station, the King County Courthouse, between Seneca and Union streets, at the Westlake Mall, and near the Seattle Convention Center. The Burlington Northern Railroad opposed Metro's preference for the tunnel to cross the existing Great Northern Tunnel by going under it, the agency stating that passing over would require a cut-and-cover tunnel that would disrupt City Hall Park. The following month, Metro announced that it would use a fleet of 200 dual-mode buses for the first decade of tunnel operations, with an eventual switch to subway trains. The bored tunnel would be able to carry 180 buses an hour in each direction, serving either a wide island platform or two smaller side platforms that would be dug out from the surface. In April, Metro published the draft environmental impact statement for the tunnel project, estimating a cost of $387 million (equivalent to $1199 million in 2025 dollars) and a completion date of June 1989. The cost of the project drew criticism at public hearings for using a significant portion of Metro's capital budget, a total of $840 million from sales tax revenue approved by voters in 1980, as well as potential disruption to business during the cut-and-cover construction of the stations and Pine Street segment of the tunnel.

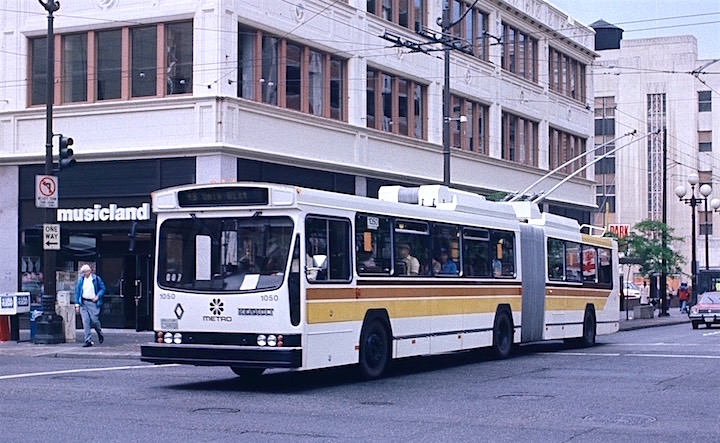
A Renault dual-mode bus tested by Metro in the 1980s for the tunnel project

UMTA ranked Metro's bus tunnel project as first among transit projects favored to receive federal funding in 1985, despite its reliance on unproven dual-mode buses. Metro tested a prototype Renault PER 180 dual-mode trolleybus in 1983, describing it as problematic after finding it exceeded freeway axle load limits by 2 short tons (1.8 t) and having to replace several parts after several mechanical failures. Congress later appropriated $20 million to the City of Seattle for the bus tunnel project in October 1984, allowing for right-of-way acquisition to begin, but the funds were withheld until restrictions on new transit projects were lifted by the United States Senate the following May.

The Downtown Transit Project subcommittee unanimously approved Metro recommendations that would reduce the number of bus tunnel stations from six to five, saving $35 million, as well as opting for tunnel boring machines for the 3rd Avenue segment to minimize surface-level disruptions that would be present from cut-and-cover excavation. Stations would be located at Union Station south of Jackson Street, under 3rd Avenue and James Street, under 3rd Avenue and University Street, at the Westlake Mall and at 9th Avenue and Pine Street near the Seattle Convention Center. The Metro Council approved the station sites and use of tunnel-boring machines in July 1985, proceeding with final design by approving a $25.9 million contract with Parsons Brinckerhoff for engineering work related to the project.

In March 1986, the federal government offered Metro a contract committing $195 million in UMTA funding toward the bus tunnel, requiring that a decision on whether to move forward with the project be made by December 31. A month later, the King County Council asked Metro to consider delaying construction of the bus tunnel while waiting for assurance on federal funding being able to cover half of the $395 million cost of the project; the council was scheduled to begin awarding contracts for utility relocation along 3rd Avenue and Pine Street in preparation for tunnel construction. On May 15, the Reagan administration signed a contract with Metro to commit $197 million of the $395 million required for the bus tunnel project, assuming re-authorization of a mass transit grant program by Congress, while also extending the deadline for a final decision to September 1987. Hours later, the Metro Council awarded the first construction contract for utility relocation, with construction set to begin in July. The Metro Council accepted the UMTA contract during their June 5 meeting, allowing for bidding on tunnel construction to begin. The tunnel construction contract was awarded to the joint venture of Guy F. Atkinson Construction and Dillingham Construction in late September for $44.16 million, beating seven competing bids with an estimate far lower than the approximately $61 million predicted by Metro engineers. The contract for the dual-mode trolleybuses was awarded by the Metro Council to Breda Costruzioni Ferroviarie in October, consisting of an order for 236 buses at a cost of $133 million (equivalent to $391 million in 2025 dollars); it was approved by UMTA in November.

=== Construction ===
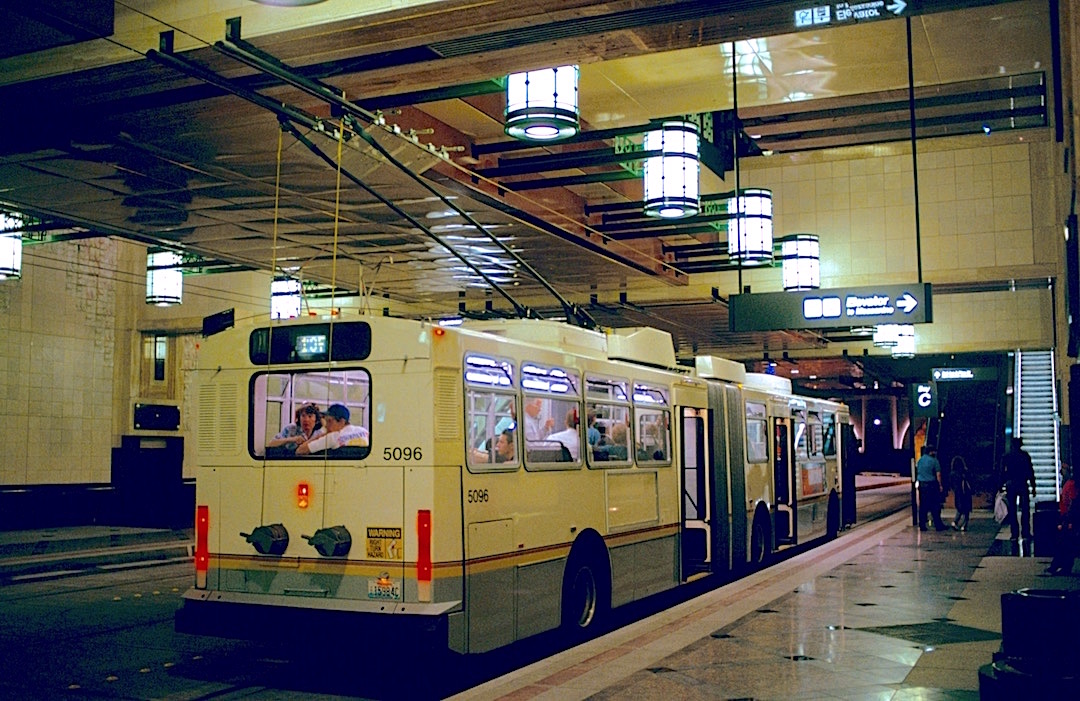
A dual-mode bus at Westlake station in 1990, operating as an electric trolleybus while in the tunnel

Construction on the bus tunnel project began with partial closures of 3rd Avenue in July 1986 for utility relocation, narrowing traffic to one lane in either direction and restricting traffic to buses and emergency vehicles during rush hour. To prepare for extended periods of service disruption on 3rd Avenue, Metro Transit also moved its electric trolleybus routes onto 1st Avenue.

Excavation of the 3rd Avenue tunnel segment began with the ceremonial launch of the "Mighty Mole", a 140-short-ton (130 t), 129-foot-long (39 m) tunnel boring machine (TBM), on March 6, 1987. The TBM, designed by Robbins Company of Kent, Washington, and built by Nicholson Manufacturing in Seattle, began digging the western tunnel from Union Station the following May. A second, identical "Mighty Mole" TBM began digging the parallel eastern tunnel on June 29. During tunnel boring under 3rd Avenue between Spring Street and Madison Street on October 21, a small earthflow damaged a water main and caused pavement on 3rd Avenue to drop 8 inches (20 cm), shutting down water in the nearby Seattle City Light and 1001 Fourth Avenue Plaza buildings. While repairing the broken water main, electricians working on damaged high-voltage cables caused a small power outage that affected eight downtown buildings on the night of October 28, but were able to restore power by the following morning. Work on the western tunnel was briefly interrupted in November, when the TBM hit an unexpectedly large pocket of loose sand under Madison Street that had to be stabilized with grout to prevent damage to the adjacent Seattle City Light building. Boring on both tunnels was stopped in early January 1988, when a pocket of wet sand was encountered 300 feet (91 m) before the planned 90-degree turn onto Pine Street. Metro and tunnel contractors Atkinson/Dillingham, who had scheduled tunnel excavation for completion in mid-January, closed 3rd Avenue between Pike and Pine streets and installed 40 drilled wells to remove water from the sand pocket in February. Digging resumed on the western tunnel on March 14, and the TBM reached Westlake station on April 9, completing the first of the two tunnels. The eastern tunnel was completed a month later on May 18, allowing for parts of the TBMs to be salvaged and the steel outer shells to be buried in the tunnel.

The Pine Street segment of the tunnel was planned to be dug cut-and-cover from the surface. In preparation for utility relocation work on Pine Street, Metro moved 36 bus routes serving the corridor to other east–west streets in February 1987. On April 27, excavation of the tunnel began with the closure of Pine Street, and its offramp to Interstate 5, to automobile traffic between 3rd Avenue and Boren Avenue. Workers finished digging in late August, allowing the project to progress to concrete pouring for the roadway. Pine Street was briefly re-opened for the Christmas shopping season beginning November 1 at the request of downtown merchants, with a temporary surface laid over backfill for automobiles and pedestrians. On January 4, the street was closed to automobile traffic once again, along with the intersection of 5th Avenue and Pine Street and the Pike Street offramp of I-5, to install utility lines and a permanent roadway. Pine Street was fully reopened to traffic on November 1, 1988, coinciding with the completion of Westlake Park and the Westlake Center shopping mall, a year ahead of schedule.

By October 1988, Metro reported that 53% of major construction was complete and anticipated that the tunnel would be completed in May 1990 and opened for service in September 1990. Seattle Mayor Norm Rice and City Council members Paul Kraabel and George Benson recommended a limited opening of the tunnel for the 1990 Goodwill Games to be held in July, but Metro rejected the proposal so that the safety systems of the tunnel could be tested adequately before service began. Testing in the bus tunnel began with a ceremonial first run on March 15, 1989, first with a diesel bus and then one of the Breda dual-mode trolleybuses operating in diesel mode, as the overhead trolley wires had not yet been installed. Wooden planks and steel plates covered slots in the concrete roadway where rails would be installed later. Local media were given a tour the next day. By January 1990, the tunnel stations were declared "nearly complete", with only minor work still left for contractors. Murals and other interactive art installations were placed in the nearly complete stations from December 1989 onward, as part of a $1.5 million arts program. Tunnel construction was finished on June 7, 1990, leaving Metro to test safety systems and train personnel for regular service to begin in September.

The initial cost of the tunnel project was estimated in 1984 to be $334.6 million, but the final costs rose 56% over budget to a total of $468.7 million (equivalent to $1.16 billion in 2025 dollars); the project's cost overruns were blamed on unanticipated soil conditions on the approach to Pine Street from 3rd Avenue, complaints and payouts to downtown businesses disrupted by tunnel construction, and the death of an electrician during construction. Excavated dirt from the project was used as fill for runway expansion at Paine Field in nearby Everett.

==== South African granite scandal ====
A minor scandal involving the bus tunnel project emerged in late 1988, over the discovery that granite to be used by Metro in the tunnel's stations had been sourced from South Africa. The Verde Fontaine granite was quarried in South Africa, which had been under Apartheid rule at the time, but was cut and finished in Italy, allowing for it to be approved despite the Metro Council's ongoing boycott of South African goods. The Verde Fontaine granite was selected for use as benches and interior walls in Westlake and Pioneer Square stations by architecture firm TRA; Metro was unaware that Verde Fontaine was only quarried in South Africa. The granite's origin was discovered by an activist from the Black Contractors Coalition in late 1988, who notified Metro and members of the Metro Council. Metro determined that replacing the 24,000 square feet (2,200 m^{2}) of granite would cost $500,000 and delay both stations but would not delay the planned 1990 opening and would be covered by contingency funds in the project's budget.

During a press conference on January 25, 1989, Metro Director Alan Gibbs confirmed that the granite had been quarried in South Africa and announced that an investigative report would be delivered to the Metro Council Transit Committee the following week. The announcement was met with calls from King County Councilman Ron Sims to fire the responsible Metro officials who knowingly allowed the purchase. Metro's ban on South African goods was stricter than the federal sanctions, which only prohibited importation of specific materials such as steel, coal, uranium and agricultural products, and was used by UMTA to threaten to pull its funding for the bus tunnel project.

A report by the Metro Council Rules Committee delivered in March stated that the granite's origin was discovered in early 1988, and was authorized by tunnel superintendent David Kalberer with the assumption that only a small amount would be used to furnish University Street station (now Symphony station). Kalberer, who received praise for his work on the project before the scandal, admitted that the failure to consult the Metro Council's tunnel subcommittee before signing off on the deal was his mistake. Metro Director Alan Gibbs resigned on February 23 as a result of the scandal and was succeeded by technical director Richard Sandaas in September. The granite was rejected by Metro and was returned to the supplier in Italy.

Before this discovery, in September 1987, African-American rights groups had forced tunnel contractor Atkinson/Dillingham to return 36 steel beams from South Africa used for temporary shoring at Pioneer Square station. This led Metro Director Alan Gibbs to propose a ban on South African materials by Metro for its projects, which was adopted by a resolution of the Metro Council on September 17.

=== Opening and bus-only operation ===
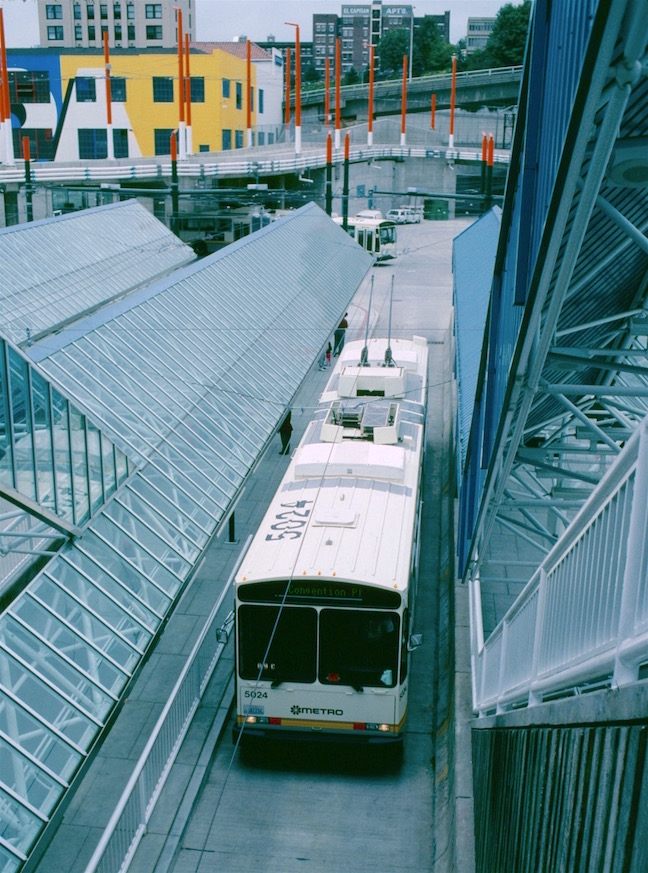
Dual-mode buses at Convention Place station on opening day, September 15, 1990

Regular service in the bus tunnel began on September 15, 1990, on five routes serving the University District, North Seattle, and Renton. The limited service was the result of delays in the manufacturing of dual-mode buses from Breda, which were fully delivered in 1991. The opening was preceded by soft openings of each individual station, beginning with Westlake station in August 1989, and ending with Convention Place station the day before the beginning of service. A ceremonial walk and run was held on September 9, 1990, and attracted 5,000 participants.

In its first year of operations, the bus tunnel carried 28,000 daily passengers on 688 scheduled bus trips. The tunnel reduced the number of buses operated on 3rd Avenue at peak hours from 190 to 86, with 20 Metro routes using the tunnel. The Seattle Times called it a "qualified success", commenting that the tunnel was like a "mini-subway system". The paper's editorial board also requested that Metro expand tunnel hours to keep buses running for late-night workers and entertainment events held on weekends. On December 9, 1991, the SODO Busway opened, extending bus service from the tunnel into SODO and moving southbound routes off Interstate 5. Direct access from Interstate 90 to the bus tunnel was opened in February 1992 as part of a reversible express lane system for the new floating bridge.

The first use of the tunnel by Sound Transit buses began on September 18, 1999, with the takeover of Metro's Seattle–Bellevue express route, which was renumbered from 226 to 550. To operate buses in the tunnel, Sound Transit leased 20 dual-mode buses from Metro, repainted them in the agency's colors, and contracted with Metro to operate the route along with other Sound Transit Express routes in King County.

=== Renovation for light rail ===
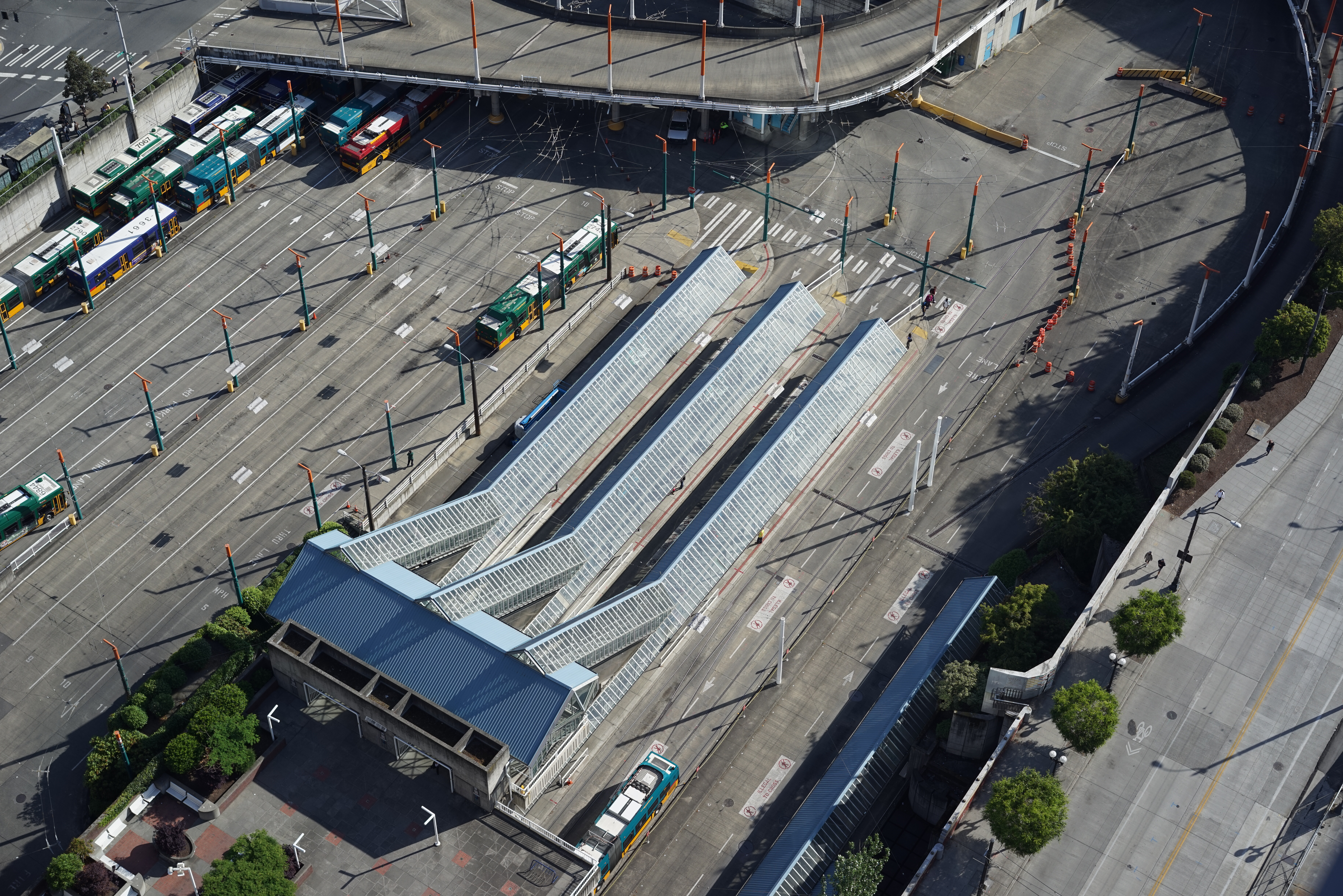
Aerial view of Convention Place station, the former northern terminus of the tunnel and the only station not served by Link light rail trains

From the outset, the bus tunnel was intended to be converted for light rail trains at some point in the future. Metro approved the addition of tracks to the bus tunnel in 1988, appropriating half of the $5 million used to install them during tunnel construction, the remainder coming from federal sources. To save $1.5 million in costs, Metro eliminated most of the rail's electrical insulation, which would later render them unusable for rail service.

A regional transit authority was formed in the early 1990s to build and operate a light rail system that would use the bus tunnel within Downtown Seattle. The authority, later named Sound Transit, gained voter approval in November 1996 to build a $3.9 billion system between Seattle–Tacoma International Airport, Downtown Seattle, and the University District. In 1998, Sound Transit found that the rails in the tunnel would need to be replaced at a cost of up to $110 million and require a full closure for two years. The plan would also require the purchase of new hybrid electric buses to replace the Breda fleet, as the electrical systems were incompatible. Convention Place station would have to be abandoned as it was too shallow to support a northern extension under Interstate 5.

Sound Transit approved its route for the light rail project, named Central Link (now the 1 Line), in November 1999, including four of the five stations in the downtown transit tunnel (excluding Convention Place). King County Executive Ron Sims proposed transferring ownership of the tunnel, along with $130 million in debt and liabilities for maintenance and operations, from King County Metro to Sound Transit in 2004. The two agencies signed an agreement in May 2000 that formally transferred ownership and responsibility for the tunnel to Sound Transit, in exchange for $195.6 million paid to King County Metro. Metro would retain ownership of Convention Place station and other assets, while Sound Transit would convert the tunnel to rail operation after 2004.

Sound Transit underwent a funding crisis in 2001 after the Central Link light rail project was found to be over budget and would not be able to open until 2009, three years later than planned. The light rail project was truncated to Westlake station in Downtown Seattle and to Tukwila, the sections north of downtown and south to the airport being deferred to a later date. The King County Council called for a new agreement to be negotiated with Sound Transit adding requirements for an adopted plan for light rail service to Northgate, and for a study into new riders that light rail would bring to the tunnel over a conventional bus network. In early 2002, Sound Transit also explored, and ultimately rejected, a proposal to build a parallel, rail-only tunnel under 5th Avenue that would cost $1 billion.

Sound Transit and the King County Council signed a new joint-operations agreement in June 2002, leaving King County Metro as owners of the tunnel and Sound Transit responsible for paying part of the tunnel's debt service at an estimated cost of $65 million. The agreement would allow for buses and light rail trains to share the tunnel and its stations beginning in 2009, after a two-year closure for renovations. A separate agreement signed in May 2003 selected King County Metro as the operator of the light rail line.

Metro began testing a fleet of new hybrid diesel-electric buses in 2002, intending to use them in the bus tunnel before and after the conversion to joint bus-rail operations. The first few of a planned fleet of 235 hybrid diesel-electric articulated buses began operating on tunnel bus routes in June 2004. The Breda dual-mode trolleybuses were removed from the tunnel in January 2005 and would later be refurbished into electric-only trolleybuses for use on the city's trolleybus network. The last day of trolleybus operation in the tunnel was January 24, 2005, with only a single dual-mode bus in service on the final day. A proposal to accommodate trolleybuses in the tunnel after the light rail renovations with alternating sections of wire was considered by Sound Transit and Metro but was not selected as the preferred alternative for joint operations.

In February 2004, Sound Transit announced that it would begin the closure and renovation of the bus tunnel in September 2005, two years earlier than scheduled, to save money and reduce construction delays. Construction of a stub tunnel under Pine Street near Convention Place station, to be used for light rail train storage and turnback, as well as a future extension to Capitol Hill, began in January 2005. The bus tunnel was closed on September 24, 2005, moving the tunnel's 21 routes and 140 buses per hour to surface streets. 3rd Avenue was converted to a "transit-priority corridor" during peak periods, restricting general traffic to one-block travel.

The $82.7 million construction contract for the transit tunnel renovation was awarded to Balfour Beatty in August 2004, 12 percent below Sound Transit's estimates. The majority of the cost was paid by Sound Transit and supplemented by $8.1 million from King County Metro. As part of the renovations, the tunnel's roadway was lowered by eight inches (20 cm) to allow for level boarding, required by the Americans with Disabilities Act; as a result, Metro added strobe lights to bus mirrors, which were lowered to head height, and added warning signs. New electrical, mechanical, and emergency systems were installed, along with a new communications system connecting to a joint-operations center. The project ended up costing $94 million in total, 3.4 percent over the budget set in 2004. During the closure, Metro found that average travel time through downtown increased only 11 percent during the afternoon peak period, and ridership on popular routes only dropped slightly.

=== Joint bus and train operations ===
The tunnel reopened to service on September 24, 2007, with tunnel routes modified to group common destinations together. Initially, the reopened tunnel was in use only on weekdays, with Saturday operation not yet reinstated. Stations were given new entrance signs, lighting fixtures, electronic passenger information signs, and restored paint. The peak bus-only restrictions on 3rd Avenue remained in place after the reopening, along with the skip-stop service that Metro implemented on the street. The tunnel was temporarily closed for nine days in December after a computer glitch disrupted the tunnel's new emergency-control system, which was repaired and replaced. The tunnel had remained closed on weekends after its reopening, but Saturday operation was reinstated and Sunday operation was introduced in May 2009.

Simulated light rail testing in the tunnel also began on May 20, 2009, with two-car trains operating alongside in-service buses, making it the first joint bus and rail tunnel with stations in the United States; the Mount Washington Transit Tunnel, a joint bus and rail tunnel in Pittsburgh, Pennsylvania, had already been in operation but lacked underground stations. Service on the Central Link light rail line began on July 18, 2009, operating from Westlake station in the tunnel to Tukwila International Boulevard station near the airport. Light rail service was extended north from Westlake to University of Washington station (via Capitol Hill station) on March 19, 2016, coinciding with the moving of several bus routes out of the tunnel to accommodate increased train frequencies. The ramp from International District/Chinatown station to the Interstate 90 express lanes was closed in September 2018 as part of preparations for East Link construction.

=== End of bus service ===
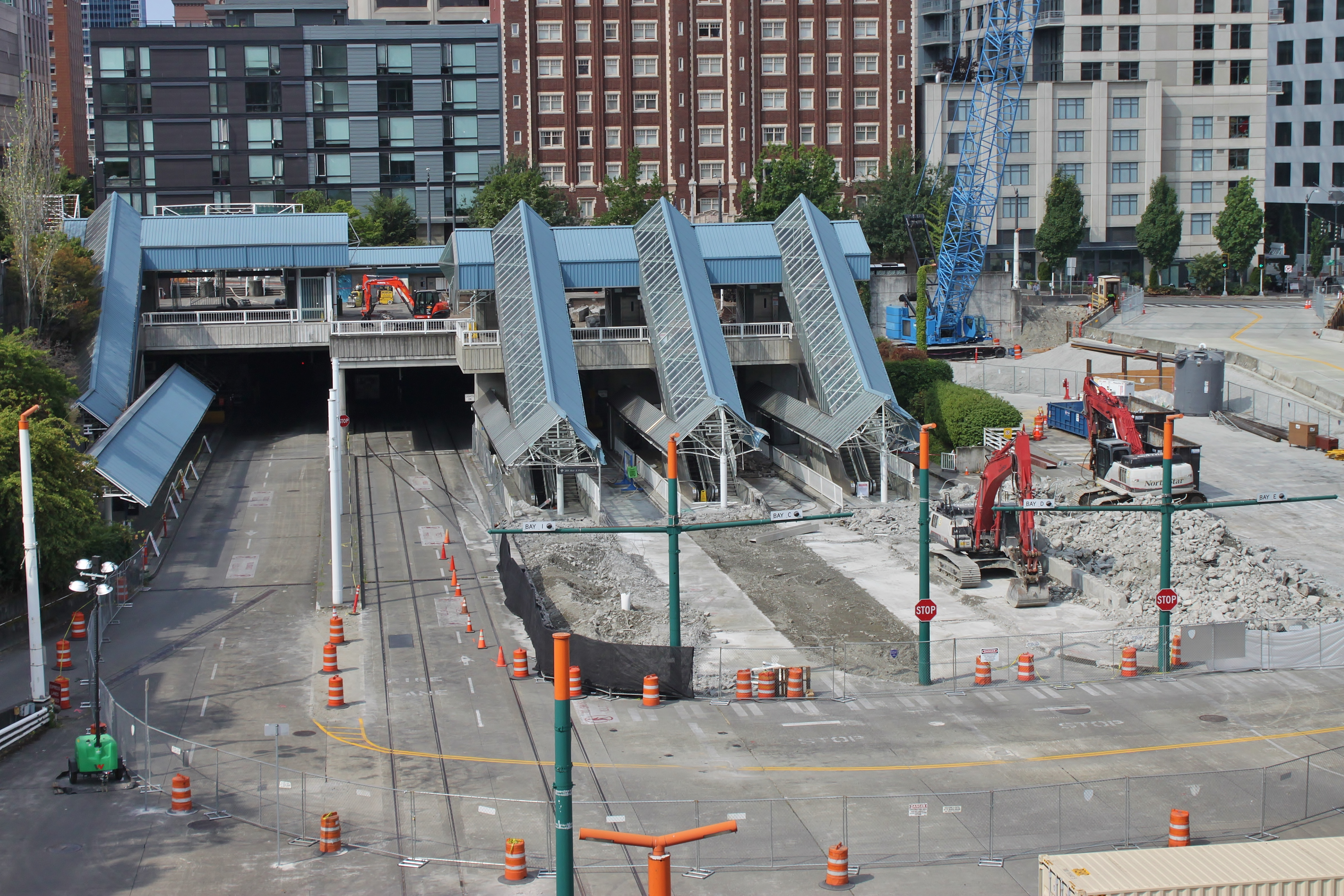
Demolition of the Convention Place station platforms in July 2018

In November 2015, King County Metro signed a $147 million agreement to sell Convention Place station to the Seattle Convention Center for redevelopment. The convention center plans to build a new expansion on the property, necessitating the closure of the station and transit tunnel to buses earlier than planned. In 2017, Sound Transit and the Seattle Department of Transportation announced that the tunnel would become rail-only in 2019, two years sooner than the planned switch in 2021 to coincide with the opening of the Northgate Link Extension. Convention Place station was permanently closed on July 21, 2018, and was replaced with a set of bus stops on 9th Avenue and a new tunnel access ramp.

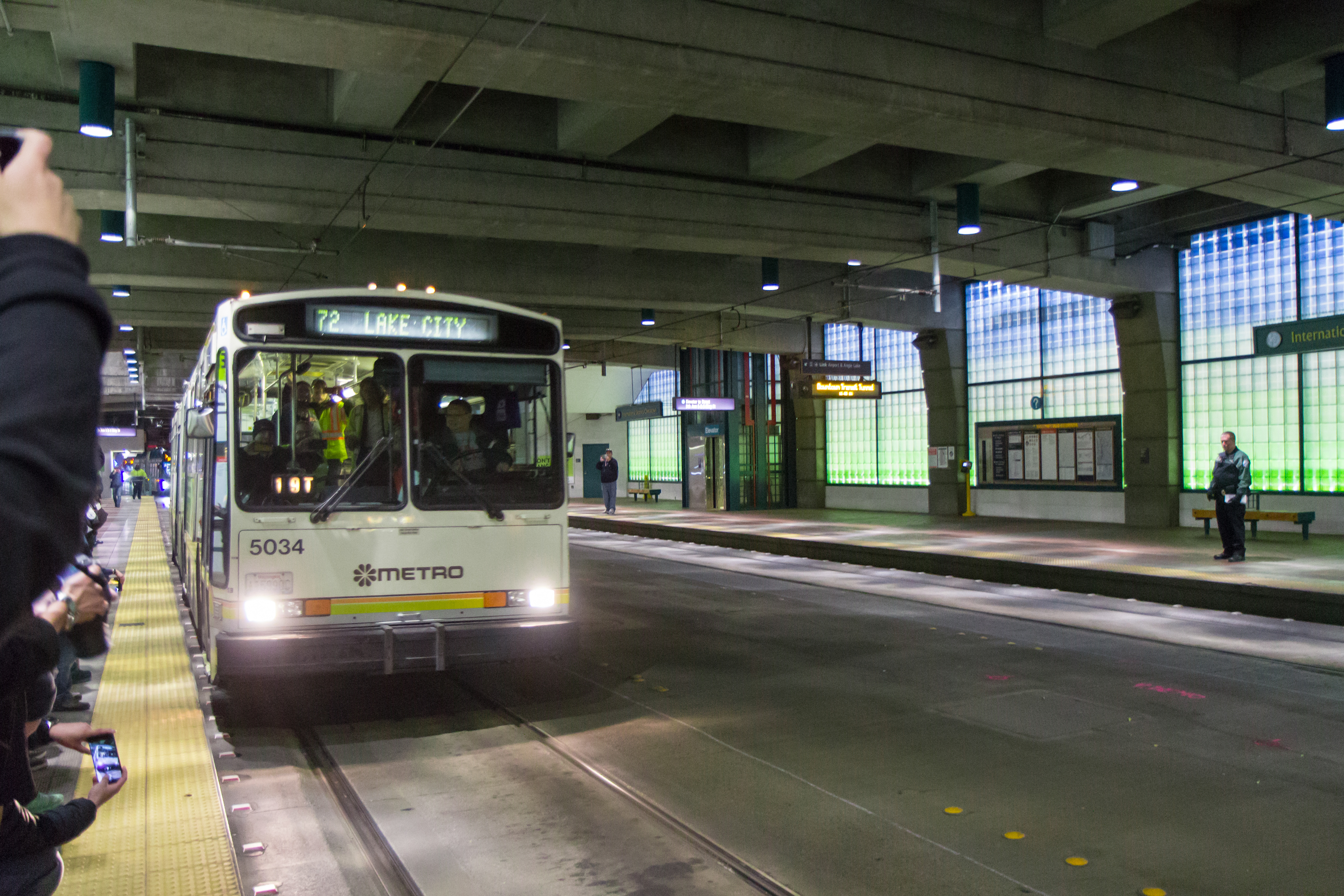
The ceremonial final bus trip in the tunnel in the early morning of March 23, 2019

Bus service in the tunnel ended on March 23, 2019, with a ceremonial trip by a preserved Breda dual-mode bus at 1 a.m. The remaining 830 bus trips through the tunnel, serving approximately 37,000 riders on seven routes, were redirected onto surface corridors on 2nd, 3rd, 4th, 5th, and 6th avenues. Metro and the city government also increased surface street capacity for buses by introducing all-door boarding for all 3rd Avenue and Westlake Avenue routes at 31 stops, improving signal timing, and adding a new northbound bus lane on 5th and 6th avenues.

During early 2020, Sound Transit built connections to East Link at International District/Chinatown station. Over a ten-week period that began in January 2020, four-car trains ran on a single track within the tunnel, with through-passengers transferring at Pioneer Square station via a temporary center platform, reducing frequency to 13–15 minutes. The tunnel was also closed for four weekends until work was completed in late March, after a week-long delay in testing. Frequency restrictions brought on by the project remained due to the coronavirus pandemic and local shutdowns. Sound Transit originally planned to assume full ownership of the tunnel in 2020, but later delayed plans due to the COVID-19 pandemic and issues with station escalators. The 36 escalators serving the downtown tunnel stations, which suffered from breakdowns and lengthy repairs, are planned to be repaired under a new contractor to replace Kone. Sound Transit took over maintenance operations on January 1, 2021, and signed a contract with Schindler Group.

=== Sound Transit ownership ===
The full transfer of ownership was approved by Sound Transit on October 27, 2022, at no cost due to an agreement with Metro to pay off $87 million of remaining debt incurred from its construction. As part of the transfer, $96 million was budgeted for upgrades to elevators and escalators, fixing utilities and station elements, and cleaning soiled artwork. In September 2022, ORCA card readers were removed from the platforms and new signage and tactile markings added for fare paid zones. Sound Transit plans to replace all 58 escalators and elevators in the transit tunnel over a nine-year period beginning in 2023 at a cost of $134 million. In addition to wear and age, some pieces of equipment are also due for replacement because of flooding and rainwater seepage. As of June 2023, 56 of the 58 elevators and escalators in the tunnel stations are in operation.

The tunnel was retrofitted from January to February 2024 to replace 500 feet (150 m) of northbound track in the curve between University Street (now Symphony) and Westlake stations where the rails in the track had drifted apart by 1/8 inch (0.32 cm). Other tunnel work, including the replacement of 58 bond boxes for signaling between the tracks, was also undertaken during the project, which had single-track service on weekdays and a full closure of the downtown section on weekends. The first week of the project resulted in crowding on station platforms and delays exceeding the scheduled 26-minute frequency for single-tracking trains. From November 2024 to June 2025, the tunnel underwent seven weekend closures to repair or replace various sections of track. A two-week closure of the southbound tunnel in April 2025 allowed crews to replace a 600-foot (180 m) section of the track. The 1 Line was divided into three segments with a single, bidirectional shuttle train between Westlake and Stadium stations on the northbound track.

A 2025 report by HNTB to address various issues with the 1 Line recommended the addition of crossover tracks in the center of Symphony or Pioneer Square stations to allow for shorter sections of single-track operations. A proposal from Sound Transit to add a third line to the tunnel for the Ballard Link Extension project as an alternative to building a parallel downtown tunnel emerged in late 2025. It would require a multi-year closure of the existing tunnel to build an underground flying junction at 3rd Avenue and Pine Street between Westlake and Symphony stations.
