= Webster and Stevens =

American photography studio, active 1903–1981

Webster and Stevens was a photographic studio partnership between Ira Webster and Nelson Stevens. They moved from Michigan to Seattle in 1899 and after working for local photography studios for several years, they opened a studio in 1902 and photographed Seattle and the Puget Sound region. They helped pioneer the area's commercial and photojournalism fields. Their marketing motto was "Anything. Anytime. Anywhere." Their studio produced more than 60,000 black-and-white photographs of Seattle and the Pacific Northwest. They had a contract as photographers for the Seattle Times from 1906 until 1923.

Webster & Stevens reprinted work by other studios and developed a photo library they marketed to newspapers and magazines

== Gallery ==
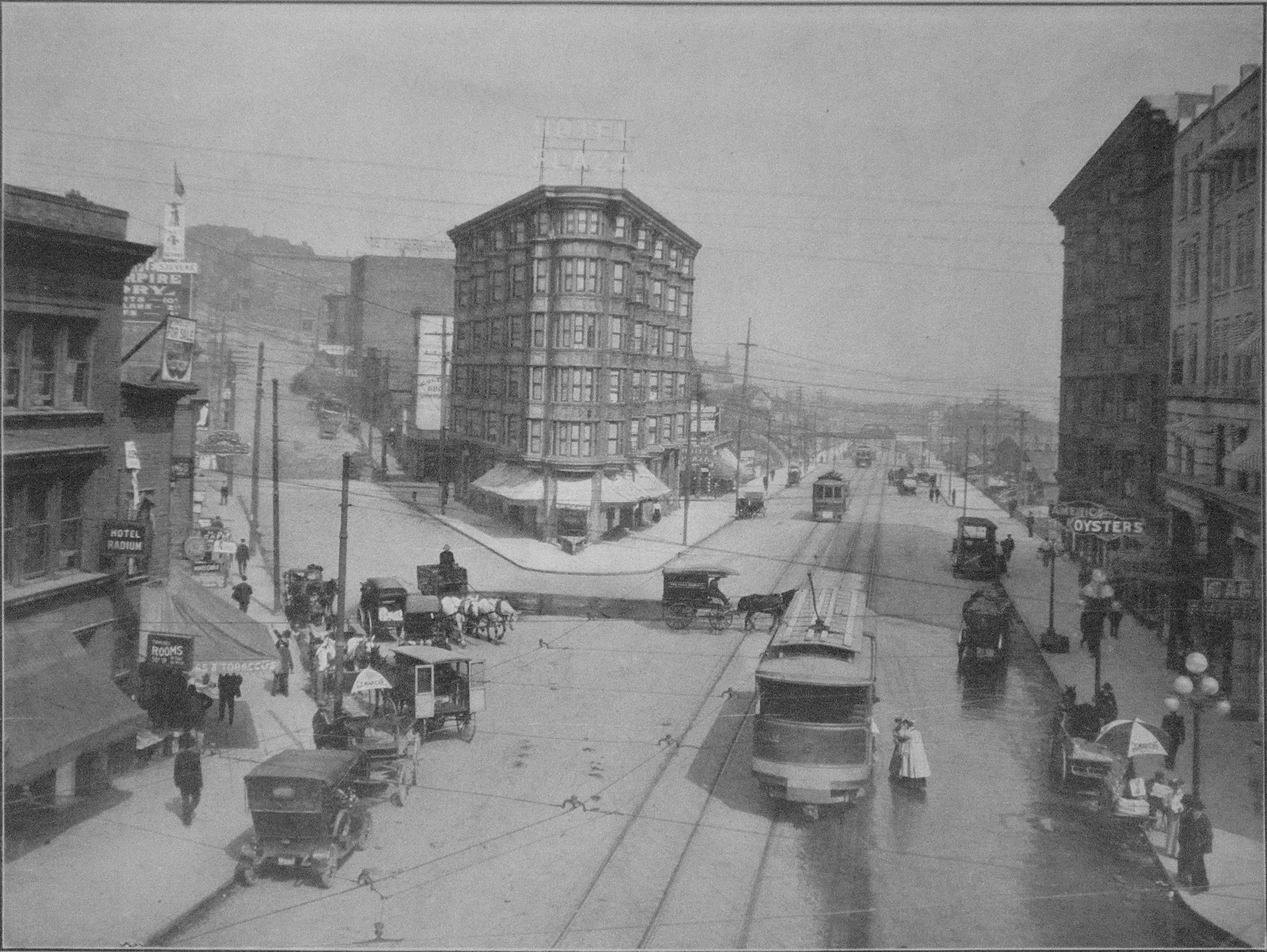
Westlake Boulevard ca. 1908

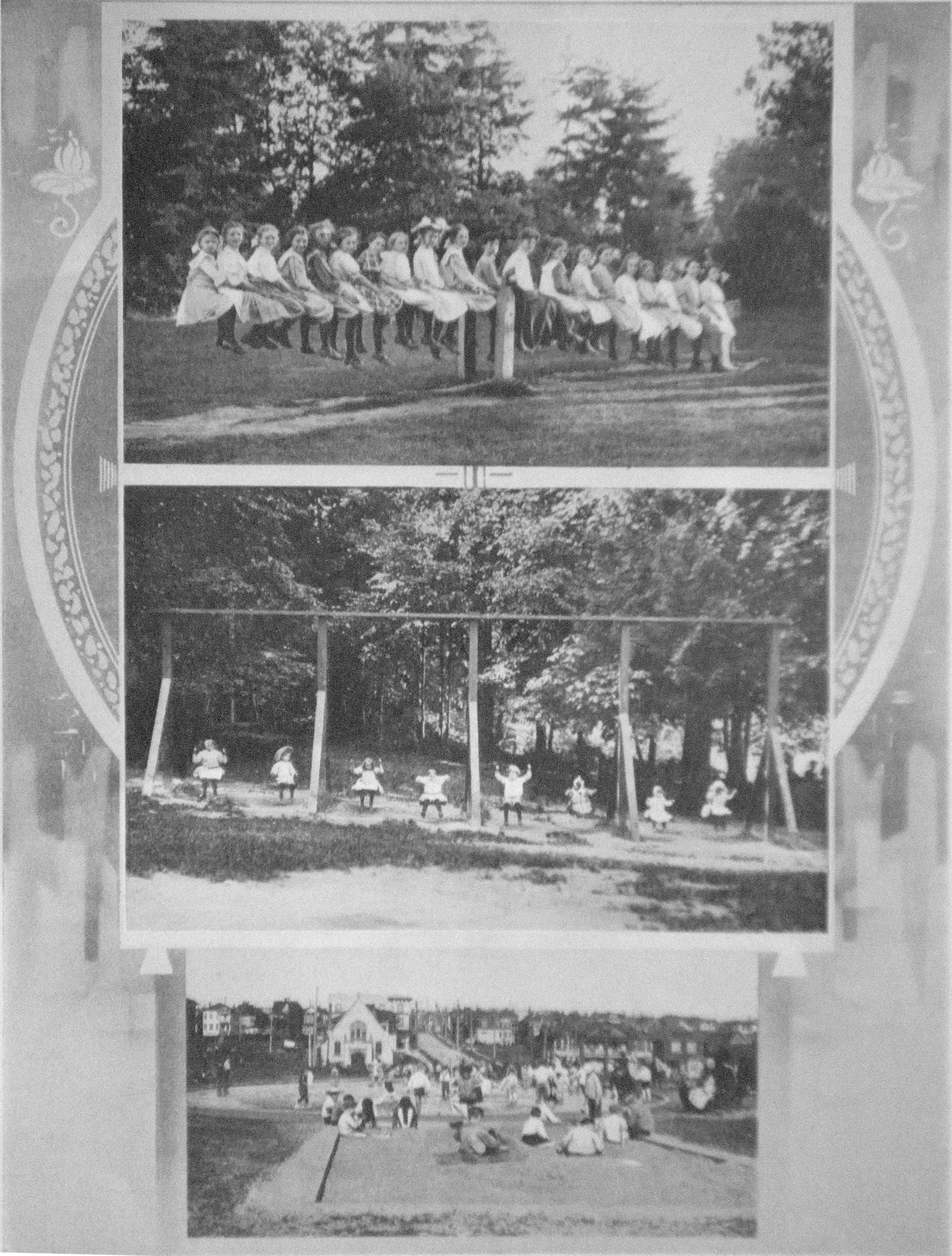
Three images of playgrounds in Seattle from The Argus 1909 Alaska-Yukon-Pacific Exposition special issue.

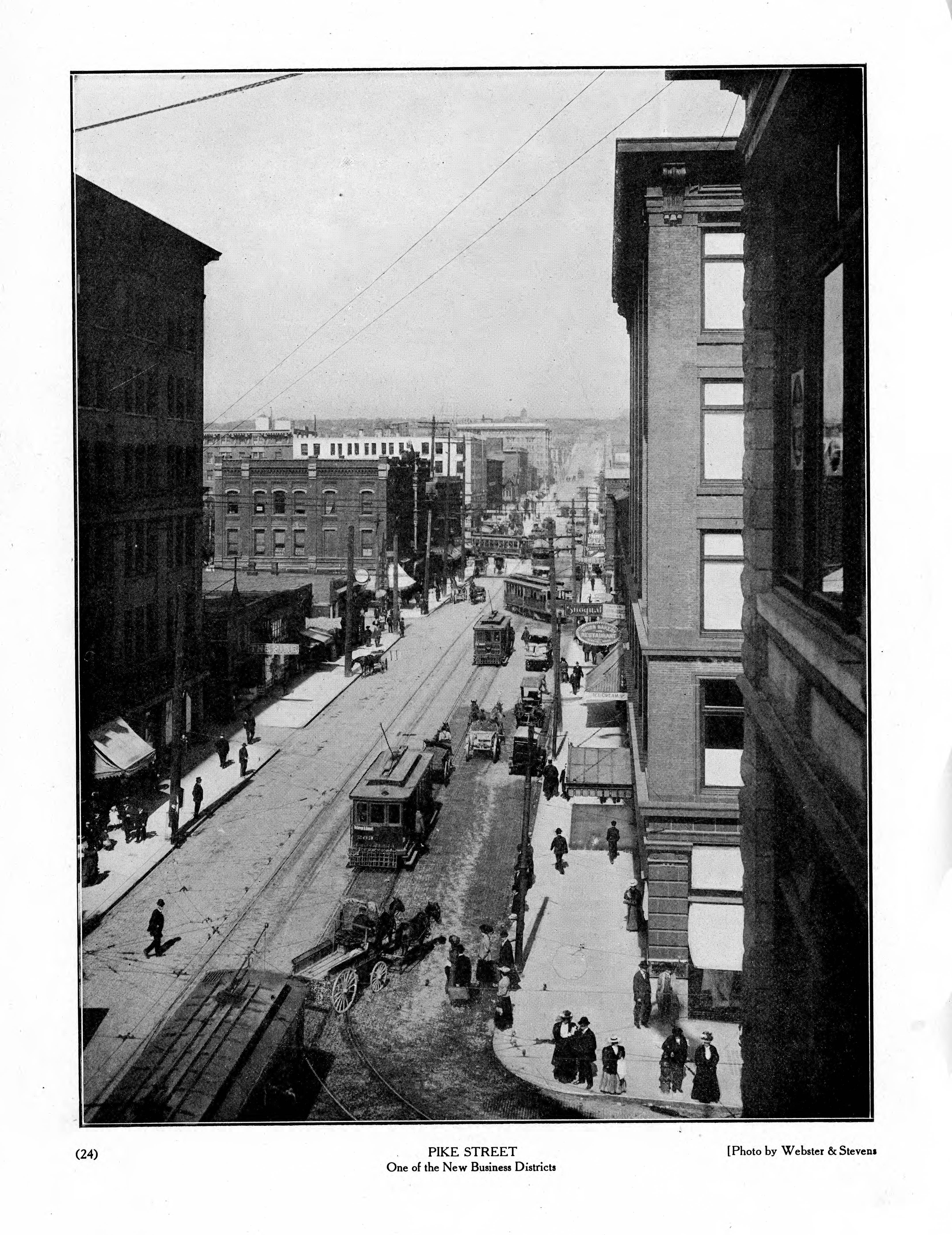
Pike Street, published in Alaska-Yukon-Pacific Exposition material

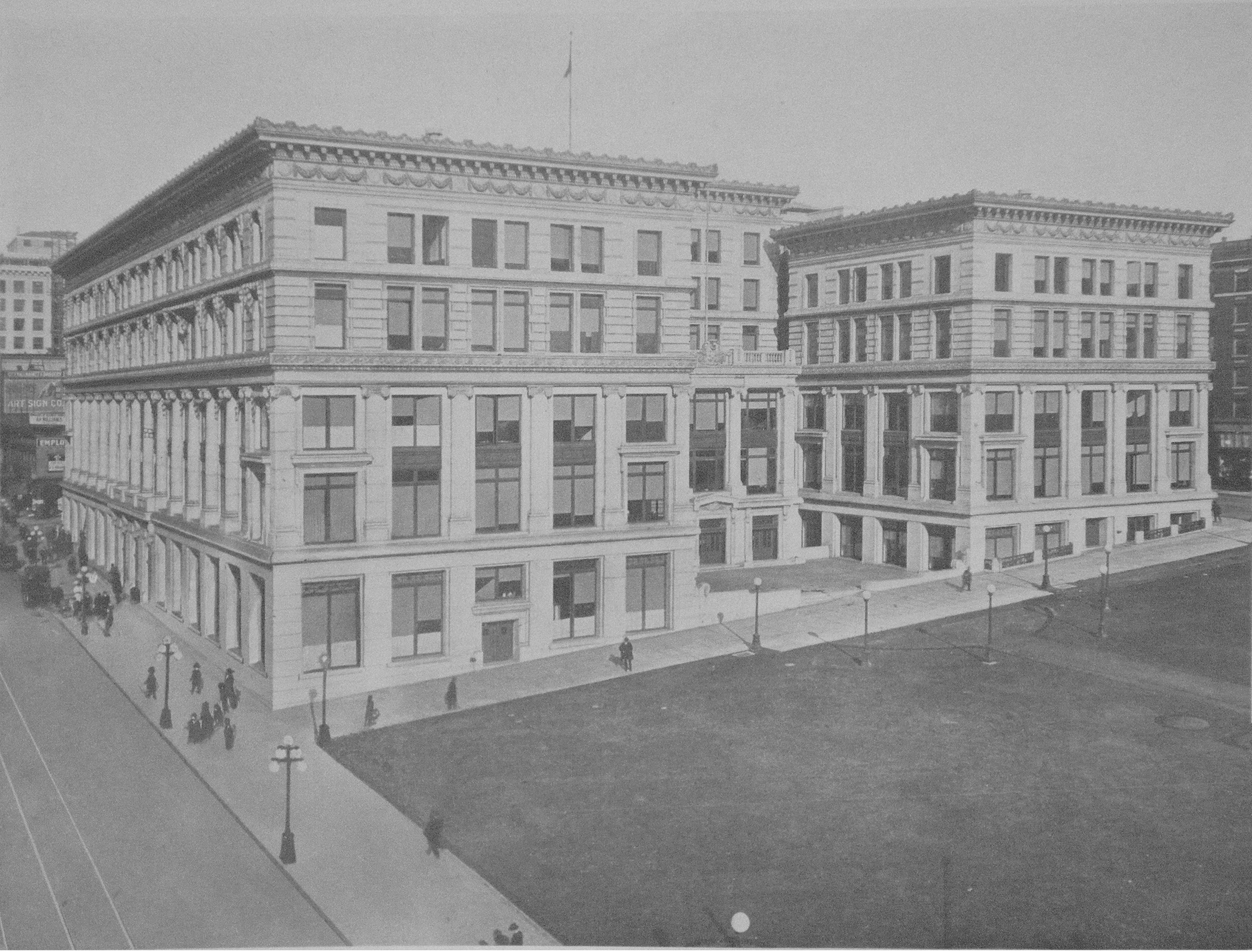
City and County Building (now the King County Courthouse) published in The Argus in 1916

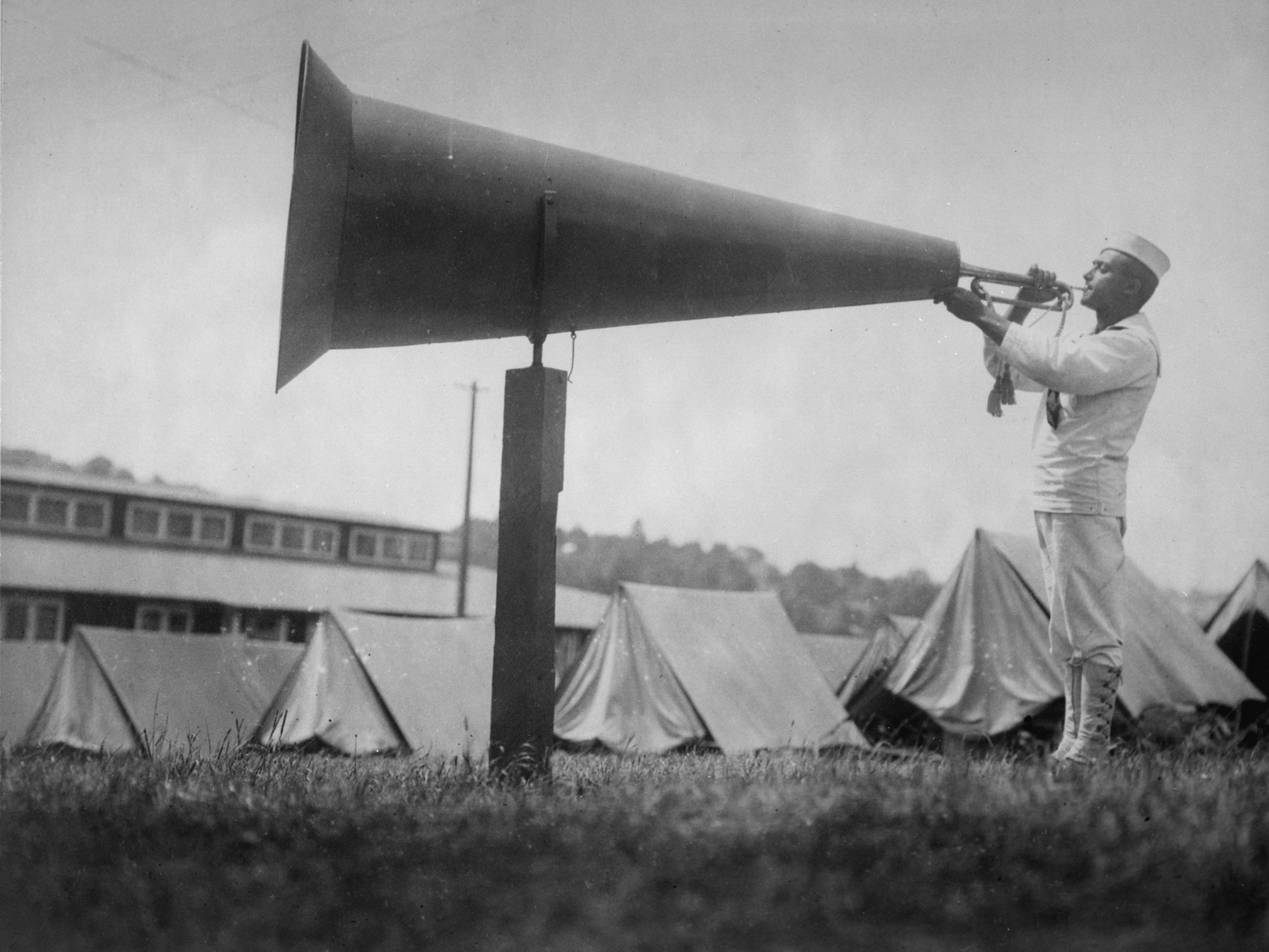

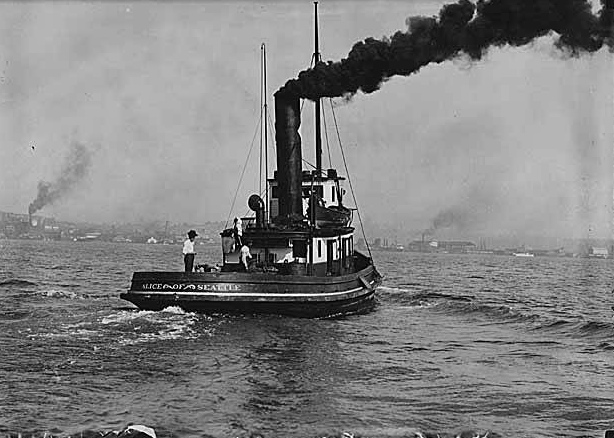
Alice of Seattle tugboat

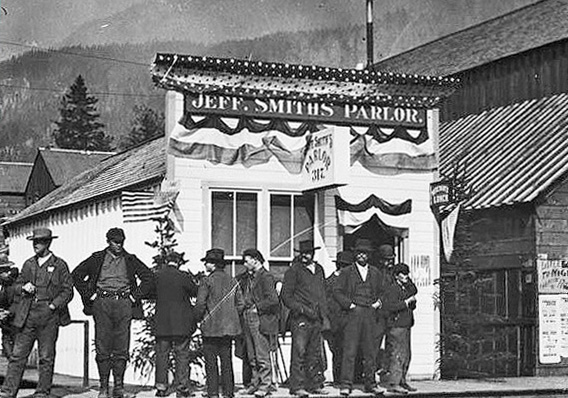
Jeff Smith (Soupy Sales) Parlor in Skagway ca. 1898 (copied by Webster & Stevens after 1902) marketed as part of the photo library offered to newspapers and magazines
