= Dan Satterberg =

American lawyer

Prosecuting Attorney of King County
- In office July 25, 2007 – January 8, 2023
- Preceded by: Norm Maleng
- Succeeded by: Leesa Manion

Personal details
- Born: Daniel Todd Satterberg; 1959 or 1960 (age 66–67) Seattle, Washington, United States
- Party: Republican (before 2018); Democratic (2018–present)
- Spouse: Linda Norman (m. 1990)
- Children: 2
- Education: University of Washington (BA, JD)

Daniel Todd Satterberg (born 1959 or 1960) is an American attorney and politician who served as the prosecuting attorney of King County, Washington from 2007 to 2023.

== Early life and education ==
Born in Seattle, Satterberg graduated from Highline High School and the University of Washington. He earned a Juris Doctor from the University of Washington School of Law.

== Career ==
Satterberg began work in the King County Prosecutor's office. There he spent four years as a trial attorney in the Criminal Division before serving as chief of staff to then-Prosecutor Norm Maleng from 1990 to 2007.

In May 2007, King County Prosecutor Norm Maleng unexpectedly died of a heart attack. Because Maleng had been elected as a moderate Republican, his successor was nominated by the King County Republican Central Committee. Satterberg was appointed by the King County Council to fill the position until a special election was held in November 2007. That November, Satterberg was elected to fill the remaining three years of Maleng's term. He subsequently won election as a Republican to a full four-year term in 2010. In 2016, Satterberg successfully pushed for a voter approved amendment to King County Charter to make the office of Prosecutor nominally non-partisan. Despite holding a non-partisan office, Satterberg made public in 2018 that his political views align with the Democratic Party.

Since 2008, Satterberg has served on the State of Washington Sentencing Guidelines Commission under appointment by Governor Christine Gregoire. He was the co-chairman, along with former Washington Attorney-General Rob McKenna, of the Washington Law Enforcement Group Against Identity Theft (LEGIT), a quasi-governmental organization that seeks to raise awareness about consumer data privacy issues in Washington.

Satterberg decided not to bring charges against Officer Ian Birk in the shooting of John T. Williams, a decision criticized by attorneys for the Williams family.

In January 2022, Satterberg announced that he would not seek reelection when his current term expired.

Legal offices
Preceded by Norm Maleng	Prosecuting Attorney of King County; July 25, 2007 – January 8, 2023	Succeeded by Leesa Manion
