= Evan L. Schwab =

American attorney (1938–2021)

Evan Lynn Schwab
- Born: April 13, 1938; Detroit, Michigan, U.S.
- Died: July 25, 2021 (aged 83)
- Education: University of Washington (BA, LLB)
- Occupation: Attorney
- Known for: Law clerk for William O. Douglas
- Spouse: Heidi Elizabeth Jensen (m. 1960; div. 1975)
- Children: 3

Evan Lynn Schwab (April 13, 1938 – July 25, 2021) was an American attorney who served as law clerk to Justice William O. Douglas of the Supreme Court of the United States during the 1963 Term.

== Early life ==
Schwab was born on April 13, 1938 in Detroit, Michigan. Schwab graduated from the University of Washington with a B.A. in 1961. He received a LL.B. with Order of the Coif honors in 1963 from the University of Washington School of Law, where he was the comment editor of the Washington Law Review. Following graduation, he clerked for Justice William O. Douglas of the Supreme Court of the United States in Washington, D.C.

== Career ==
Returning to Seattle in 1964, Schwab entered private practice at Bogle & Gates, and after its collapse became a partner at Dorsey & Whitney. Among his notable cases is representing Wendy McCaw in 1997 in her divorce from cell phone magnate Craig McCaw. In 1967, Schwab argued the case of Mempa v. Rhay before the U.S. Supreme Court, winning a unanimous opinion written by Justice Thurgood Marshall that a revocation of parole proceeding triggers the right to counsel.

In 1971, Schwab served as special deputy prosecuting attorney for the King County grand jury investigation of police payoffs led by prosecutor Chris Bayley and judge Stanley C. Soderland.

== Personal life death ==
Schwab died on July 25, 2021, at the age of 83.

== See also ==
- List of law clerks for the fourth seat of the Supreme Court of the United States
