= King County Prosecuting Attorney =

Non-partisan elected official in King County, Washington

- Incumbent; Leesa Manion since January 9, 2023
- Term length: 4 years
- Constituting instrument: King County Charter
- Website: www.kingcounty.gov/Prosecutor.aspx

The King County Prosecuting Attorney is a nonpartisan elected official in King County, Washington. The prosecuting attorney leads the King County Prosecuting Attorney's Office, and prosecutes all felonies (as well as misdemeanors in unincorporated areas, and those brought by state law enforcement agencies) that occur within King County, Washington. Since 2023, the position has been held by Leesa Manion, a former deputy county prosecutor.

== Departmental organization ==
The Prosecuting Attorney's Office is located in the King County Courthouse (in downtown Seattle, Washington) and consists of 210 deputy prosecuting attorneys and 190 administrative staff members. The Office prosecuted 6,135 felonies in 2012, about 40% of which were violent crimes. Employees are spread across three divisions:

- Criminal: Appellate Unit, Car Theft Initiative, District Court Unit, Domestic Violence Unit, Drug Case Development, Drug Court, Economic Crimes Unit, Involuntary Treatment Act, Juvenile Court Unit, Most Dangerous Offender Project, Records and Information Section, Repeat Burglar Initiative, Sentencing Unit, Sexually Violent Predator Unit, Special Assault Unit, Violent Crimes Unit
- Civil: serving as chief legal counsel and litigator for the County
- Family Support: establishes paternity, enforces support obligations, etc.

== Partial list of Prosecuting Attorneys ==
- Warren Magnuson, 1935–1937
- Lloyd W. Shorett, 1943–1949
- Chuck Carroll, 1949–1971
- Chris Bayley, 1971–1979
- Norm Maleng, 1979–2007
- Dan Satterberg, 2007–2023
- Leesa Manion, 2023–present

== See also ==
- Allegheny County District Attorney
- Baltimore County State's Attorney
- Dallas County District Attorney
- Denver District Attorney's Office
- District Attorney of Philadelphia
- Los Angeles County District Attorney
- Milwaukee County District Attorney
- New York County District Attorney
- San Diego County District Attorney
- San Francisco District Attorney's Office
