= Chris Bayley =

American lawyer

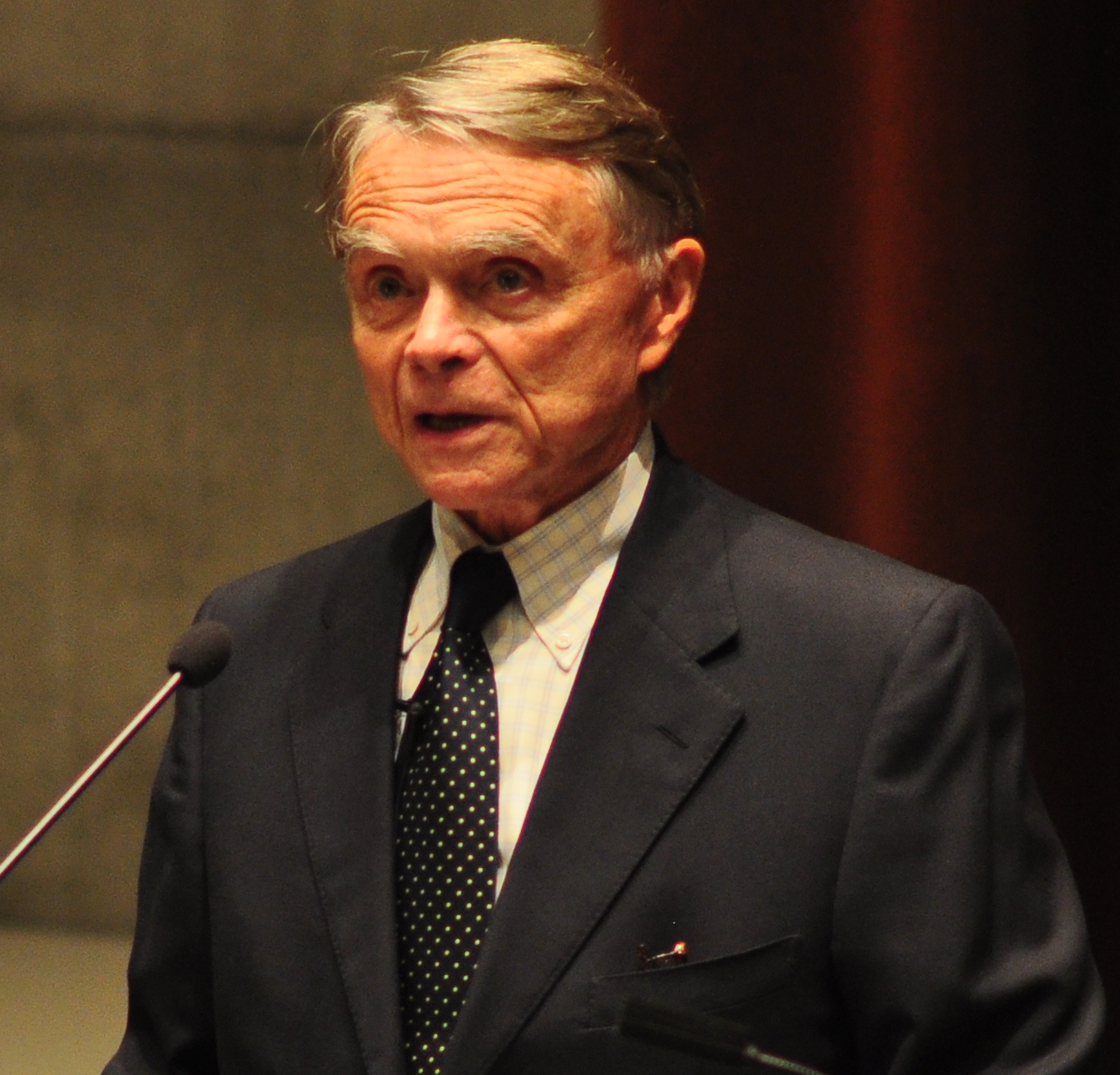
- Chris Bayley, 2015

King County Prosecuting Attorney
- In office January 3, 1971 – January 3, 1979
- Preceded by: Chuck Carroll
- Succeeded by: Norm Maleng

Personal details
- Born: Christopher T. Bayley
- Party: Republican
- Education: Harvard University; Harvard Law School
- Occupation: Lawyer, businessman

Christopher T. Bayley served as the King County prosecuting attorney from 1971 to 1979. He remains active in the political, business, and legal communities of Washington state.

== Early life and military service ==
Bayley received his Bachelor of Arts in history from Harvard College (1960) and his Juris Doctor from Harvard Law School (1966). He also served three years as an active-duty officer in the United States Navy. After his active-duty service, Bayley joined the United States Navy Reserve and served until 1985, retiring as a Captain (O-6).

== Legal and political career ==
Bayley began his legal career in 1966 as an associate at Lane Powell. He then served as a Deputy Attorney General and Chief of the Consumer Protection and Antitrust Division under Washington State Attorney General Slade Gorton. In 1971, he was elected as the King County Prosecuting Attorney. In 1971, he led a grand jury investigation with Judge Stanley C. Soderland and attorney Evan Schwab into police payoffs. Bayley served two terms and was succeeded by Norm Maleng in 1979. He then became Partner in Charge of Public Finance at Perkins Coie.

Bayley continued to remain active in Republican politics in the state of Washington. In 1998, he ran unsuccessfully for the United States Senate, losing to Linda Smith in the Republican primaries.

== Business career ==
Bayley has been involved in a number of business ventures. In 1982, he became Senior Vice President at Burlington Northern Resources. In 1985, he became President of Glacier Park Company (a real estate subsidiary of Burlington Northern Resources). In 1992, he left Burlington Northern Resources and became Chairman of New Pacific Partners. In 1998, Bayley formed the Resource Action Council (renamed to Stewardship Partners in 2002. Since 1999 Bayley has been Chair and Principal of Dylan Bay Consulting. Clients include law firms, companies and individual who need help with environmental or political strategy before the Washington legislature or local governments Recent projects include sale of 50,000 acres in the Teanaway Valley to the state for environmental protection and passage of the Washington Law on International Arbitration in the 2015 legislative session .

Bayley has served as a member of the Harvard Board of Overseers, and the national boards of The Nature Conservancy, Discovery Institute, Scenic America and The National Organization for Olmsted Parks. As of February 2021, Bayley is the acting president of the Classical KING FM Board of Directors.

Legal offices
Preceded by Chuck Carroll	King County Prosecuting Attorney; 1971–1979	Succeeded by Norm Maleng
