= King County Courthouse =

Administrative building housing the judicial branch of King County, Washington

Coordinates: 47°36′10″N 122°19′50″W

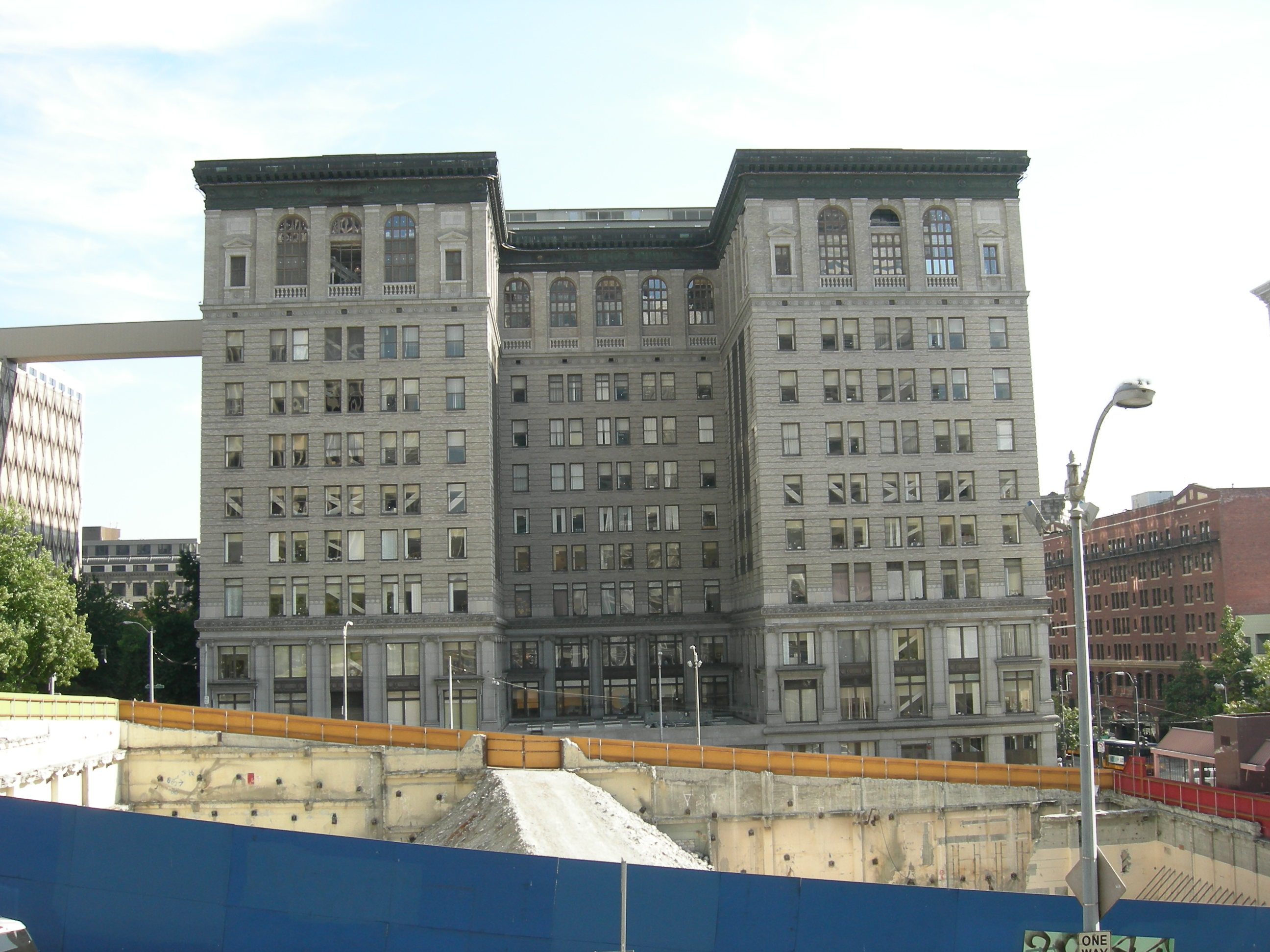
King County Courthouse (2007)

The King County Courthouse is the administrative building housing the judicial branch of King County, Washington's government. It is located in downtown Seattle, just north of Pioneer Square. The 1916 structure houses the King County Prosecuting Attorney, the King County Sheriff's Office (KCSO), the King County Council, the King County Law Library, King County Work and Education Release, and courtrooms for the King County Superior Court and the Seattle District Court. It is located just north of City Hall Park at 516 Third Avenue, between Dilling Way and James Street.

An enclosed skybridge connects the courthouse to the King County Jail; it is used to transfer prisoners between the courthouse and the jail. A pedestrian tunnel connects the courthouse to the King County Administration Building.

== History ==
In 1911, King County voters first turned down, then approved plans to build a new structure for county government. The site settled on had once been owned by Seattle founder Henry Yesler.

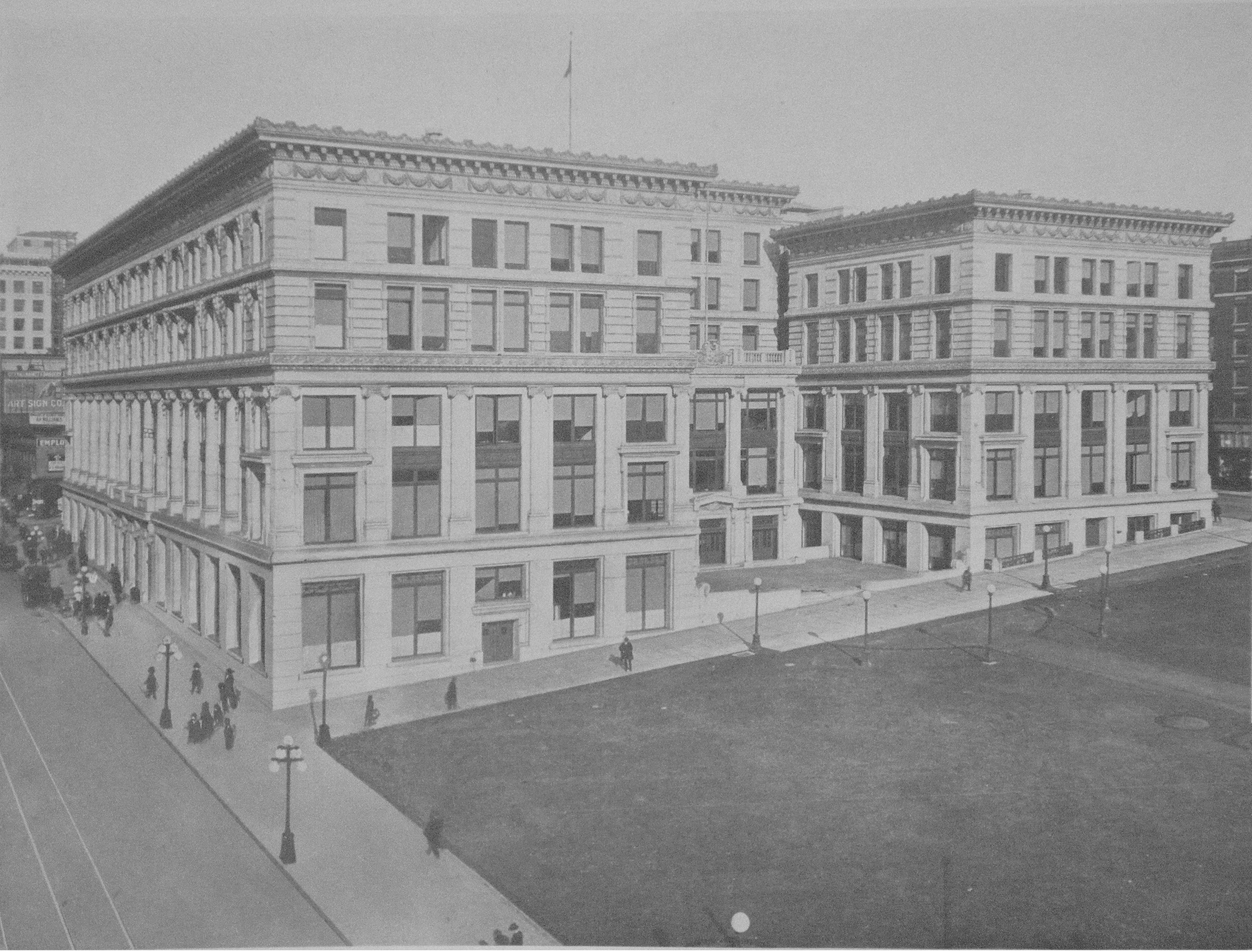
Photograph by Webster and Stevens of what was then the City and County Building. Published in The Argus in 1916

Seattle-based architect A. Warren Gould proposed a twenty-three story tower to handle anticipated growth in county functions, but the county commissioners preferred a more modest beginning so it was constructed in stages. Starting in 1914, a five-story steel frame and reinforced concrete structure was built, and dedicated May 4, 1916 as the City-County Building. In 1930, six floors were added by architects Henry Bittman and John L. McCauley, and later a three-story "attic".

The city government moved their offices from the County–City Building in 1962; the building was renamed the King County Courthouse in August of that year. Modernization efforts in 1967 added air conditioning and heavily modified the appearance of the building. In 1987, the King County Courthouse was registered as a King County landmark, which limits the style of future remodeling of public areas to restoring the original appearance.

After the 2001 Nisqually earthquake, the courthouse was seismically retrofitted. The extensive damage done to older buildings in the area by the 6.8 quake pushed the county to move forward with this project. Upon completion, murals and a treatment of the marble floor on the first floor of the Courthouse were noted decorative touches.

The area around the courthouse is proximate to major homeless service agencies and had seen a rise in crimes committed against jurors and courthouse workers. In December 2019, the King County Superior Court announced that the courthouse entrance facing 3rd Avenue would be closed for security reasons to most people, with limited access for individuals needing accommodation.
