= Stewardship Partners =

Stewardship Partners is a 501(c)(3) non-profit organization based in Seattle, Washington, United States with a mission to help private landowners restore and preserve the natural landscapes of Washington State. They have programs that promote incentive-based tools to encourage landowners and businesses to participate in voluntary conservation practices. The goal is to restore fish and wildlife habitat, improve water quality, and protect open space while maintaining the working landscape of farms, forestland, and communities throughout the state.

== History ==
Stewardship Partners co-founder Chris Bayley ran in a political campaign in the late 1990s that took him around the state of Washington where he was introduced to agriculturalists. Here he started to see the reluctance of landowners to listen to "outsiders" telling them how manage their land and the disconnect between government policy and landowners.

In 1999 Stewardship Partners set out on a mission to become a catalyst for a new cooperative model and to help landowners preserve the environment. In addition to cooperation, their other focus was to be a catalyst for local action and to develop models that others could follow. Since their inception in 1999, they have assisted hundreds of landowners, community groups, and businesses in Washington State to implement habitat restoration, environmental planning, and sustainable resource management.

== Programs and accomplishments ==
Stewardship Partners serve as liaison between private landowners and businesses and the technical, financial, and marketing resources available from governmental and non-governmental sources to help steward the environment. Their projects restore fish and wildlife habitat, improve water quality, protect open space, and "green up" the built environment while maintaining working landscapes of farms, forestland, and livable communities throughout the state.

=== Salmon-Safe ===
The Salmon-Safe Certification Program recognizes farm operations who adopt conservation practices that help restore native salmon habitat in Pacific Northwest rivers and streams. Salmon-Safe farms protect water quality, fish and wildlife habitat, and watershed health. The independent eco-label is gaining national recognition and appears on products including wine, dairy, produce, and fruit. In the four years that the Salmon Safe Certification program has been established in Washington State over 60 farms and 25 vineyards have been certified. Stewardship Partners is working on expanding the Salmon-Safe program to include golf courses and residential developments.

=== Snoqualmie initiative ===
In the Snoqualmie Valley there has been 18 land-owner based habitat restoration projects with Valley farms, restoring seven miles of river bank. Products from these farms go mainly to the Seattle market.

=== Nisqually Watershed ===
Stewardship Partners, the Nisqually Tribe, and several other non-governmental organizations came together and created the 50-year Nisqually Stewardship Plan. The program promotes environmentally sensitive land development while preserving forest, farm, and fish assets. This effort has pioneered Low Impact Development techniques in urbanizing areas, supported a sustainable natural resource economy and launched a watershed branding campaign to support local businesses.

=== Rain gardens ===
Rain gardens, along with other low impact development tools (e.g. vegetated roofs, bio-swales, pervious pavement) protect water quality in Puget Sound by infiltrating polluted storm-water on site. Since 2007 Stewardship Partners have taught over 700 homeowners, landscapers, and institutional managers about rain gardens and built 30 demonstration rain gardens with a host of community partners.
