= Killing of John T. Williams =

2010 police shooting in Seattle, Washington

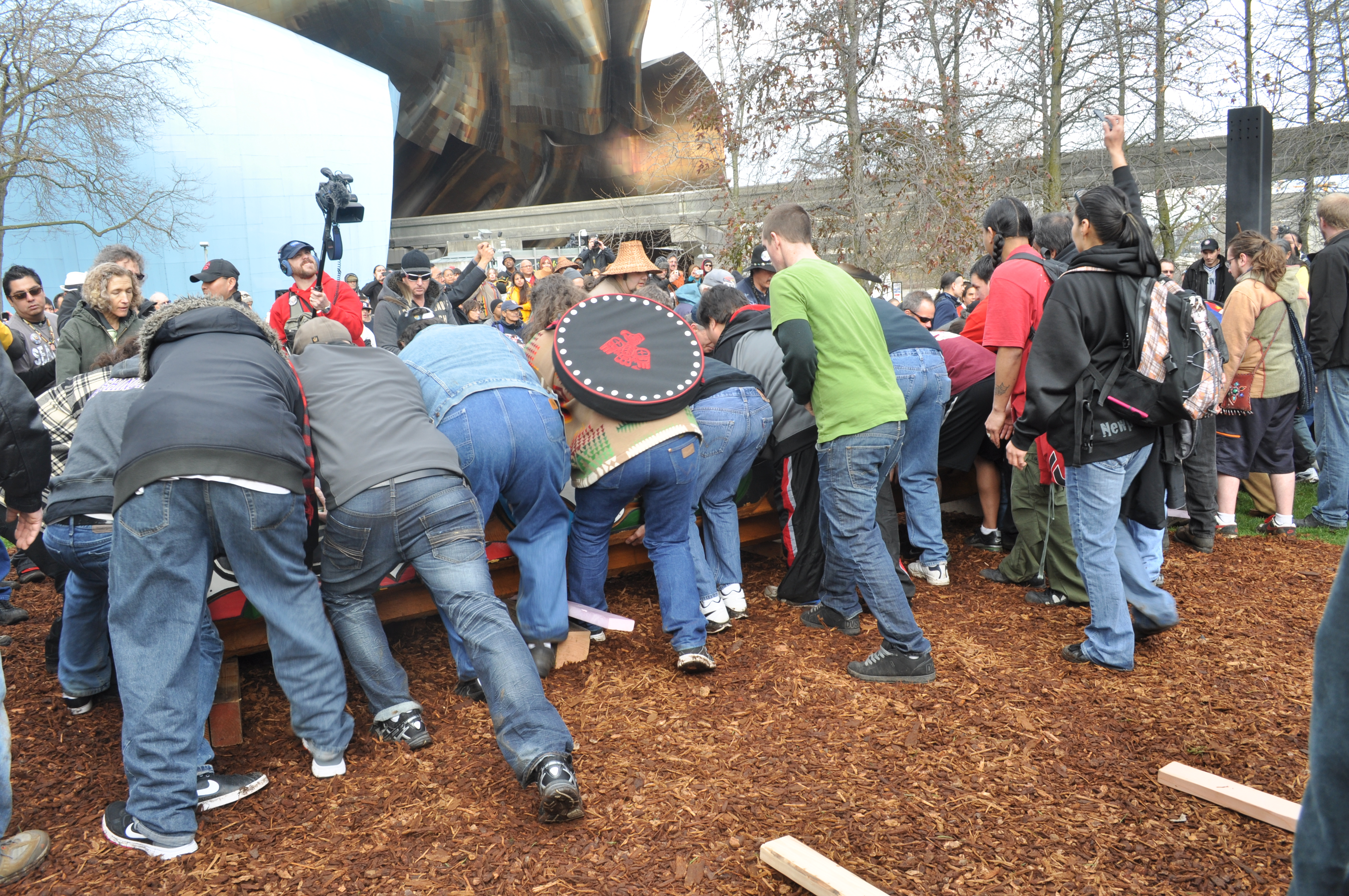
- Raising of the John T. Williams Memorial Totem pole
- Date: August 30, 2010
- Time: 4:15 p.m. (PST)
- Location: Boren Avenue and Howell Street, Seattle, Washington, U.S.
- Cause: Gunshot (Officer Birk's Glock)
- Filmed by: Birk's police car's dashboard camera
- Participants: Seattle Police Officer Ian Birk and John T. Williams
- Deaths: John T. Williams
- Inquiries: SPD Firearms Review Board; Prosecutors' offices
- Inquest: King County inquest
- Charges: None filed
- Litigation: $1.5 million settlement
- Shooting ruled "unjustified" by FRB; no criminal prosecution of Birk; Birk resigned from SPD

On August 30, 2010, John T. Williams, a Native American woodcarver, was shot four times by Officer Ian Birk of the Seattle Police Department. Williams died at the scene. The shooting was ruled "unjustified" by the police department's Firearms Review Board. The department's actions were scrutinized by the United States Department of Justice as a result of the incident.

== Biography ==
John T. Williams was born on February 27, 1960. A member of the Nuu-chah-nulth tribe, Williams lived variously during his childhood in Seattle, Victoria, and Vancouver, British Columbia. According to Williams' family, he was a seventh generation woodcarver. Williams had battled alcoholism during much of his adult life and had spent time at Western State Hospital, a mental institution in Pierce County, Washington.

== Shooting ==
At about 4:15 p.m. on August 30, 2010, Birk was driving his patrol car and saw Williams near Boren Avenue and Howell Street. The dashboard camera of Birk's patrol car showed Williams walk "through the crosswalk, hunched over (with) something in his hands, then disappear(ing) offscreen". Birk emerged from his patrol car with his pistol drawn. Birk yelled, "Hey", "Hey… Hey!", "Put the knife down", "Put the knife down. Put the knife down!" Less than 5 seconds after the first "Hey", the sound of gunshots was recorded on the camera. Williams had been holding a "scrap of wood" and "a single-blade pocketknife". Officers who arrived on the scene after the shooting and nearby witnesses later observed that the knife Williams was carrying was closed.

== Investigation ==
Birk stated to the Firearms Review Board that Williams appeared to be impaired, and that he had an open knife in his hand. Birk also stated that when Williams began to turn toward Birk that Williams was "brandishing" the knife in a "very confrontational posture" and that Williams did not obey Birk's orders to drop the knife. Birk stated that he was mindful of the fact that Williams was approximately 10 feet (3.0 m) away from him and might attack before Birk had the opportunity to react, and at that point Birk made the decision to fire.

The report of the Firearms Review Board concluded that Birk acted appropriately in contacting Williams, but that the decision to use deadly force was unjustified. The Firearms Review Board found a number of problems in Birk's actions and his subsequent testimony. The FRB found that when Birk first made the decision to contact Williams that Birk was in the safety of his patrol car and that his radio communication to police dispatchers indicated that he was conducting a routine stop of a suspicious person, but the correct action would have been for Birk to indicate explicitly to dispatchers that he "observed a man with a knife", to request backup, and to wait for backup to arrive before initiating contact. The FRB also found that Birk's decision to exit his vehicle with his firearm drawn were inconsistent with a routine assessment of a suspicious circumstance; that Birk failed to adequately identify himself as a police officer in his verbal commands to Williams; that there were inconsistencies in Birk's testimony; that whether or not the knife was open was the subject of debate but the FRB based its findings with the belief that Birk was correct in stating that the knife was open when he confronted Williams; that Birk made the decision to move to approximately within 10 feet of Williams and that this close distance is insufficient to establish a justification for the use of deadly force; that based on Williams' posture "Officer Birk's decision to use deadly force was premature", and the unanimous conclusion that Birk's discharge of his firearm was "unjustified and outside of policy, tactics and training".

== Aftermath ==
Birk resigned from the Seattle Police Department on February 16, 2011, one day after King County prosecutor Dan Satterberg decided not to press criminal charges against him. Seattle Mayor Mike McGinn declared February 27, 2011, to be "John T. Williams Day" in the city.

In August 2011, the City of Seattle paid Williams' family a settlement of $1.5 million. A 34-foot-high (10 m) totem pole honoring Williams was erected at the Seattle Center on February 26, 2012.

In 2011, The Halluci Nation recorded "Woodcarver". The song samples recordings from the shooting and the music video includes dashcam footage.

In 2016, a crosswalk painted in the style of a white deer was unveiled at Boren Avenue and Howell Street, where Williams was shot, and dedicated to him.
