= Stanley C. Soderland =

American judge

Judge of the King County Superior Court
- In office 1964–1979
- Appointed by: Albert Rosellini

Personal details
- Born: March 15, 1917 Vancouver, British Columbia, Canada
- Died: November 28, 2001 (aged 84) Seattle, Washington
- Education: University of Washington (B.A.) University of Michigan (M.A.) University of Washington School of Law (LL.B.)

Stanley C. Soderland (March 15, 1917 – November 28, 2001) was a judge of the King County Superior Court, who clerked for Justice William O. Douglas of the U.S. Supreme Court.

== Early life and education ==
Stanley Carl Soderland was born in Vancouver, British Columbia, to Carl and Irene Soderland. Stanley grew up on a farm near Snohomish, Washington. In 1936, he graduated from the University of Washington, and was made a member of Phi Beta Kappa. In 1939, Soderland received a LL.B. degree from the University of Washington School of Law, graduating first in his class. He served as the first full term clerk for Justice William O. Douglas of the U.S. Supreme Court from 1939 to 1940.

== Legal career ==
Soderland practiced personal injury law in Seattle from 1943 to 1964.

In 1964, he was appointed a judge in King County Superior Court and served until his retirement in 1979. In 1971, he oversaw the grand jury led by prosecutors Chris Bayley and Evan Schwab investigating police payoffs, and helped lead an investigation into poor conditions at the King County Jail, which resulted in a report recommending reforms. Drawing on his years as a trial lawyer, also in 1971 he published pattern jury instructions for use in civil cases. In 1976, the Washington State Trial Lawyers Association voted him "Judge of the Year."

== Family ==
He was married twice, and had one daughter, Diana Crittenden, and four sons, Stephen, Douglas, David and Carl. The family resided in the Laurelhurst neighborhood of Seattle, and had a second home on Shaw Island.

== See also ==
- List of law clerks for the fourth seat of the Supreme Court of the United States
