= Henry Chadwick (journalist) =

American journalist (1866–1934)

Henry Alexander Chadwick (June 6, 1866 – June 1934) was an American journalist; from 1894 until his death, he was the editor, owner and publisher of The Argus, a weekly newspaper in Seattle, Washington.

Chadwick was born in Searsport, Maine, and educated in nearby Gardiner and Farmingdale. While still in his mid-teens he began work as a printer for the Gardiner, Maine Home Journal. At the age of 17 he became state editor of The Daily Kennebec Journal of Augusta, Maine. His career took him briefly to Chicago, Los Angeles and then in 1888 to Seattle, where he arrived November 6, 1888 and promptly became a printer at the Seattle Post-Intelligencer.

A year after arriving in Seattle, Chadwick married Laura M. Castle, originally of Washington, D.C. He became a reporter and assistant city editor at the Seattle Press and then foreman of the composing room at the Seattle Press-Times (which later became the Seattle Times).

In 1894 he resigned from the Press-Times to take on a half interest in the Argus, which A. T. Ambrose had founded six weeks earlier. From the time of Ambrose's death in 1900, he was the sole proprietor of the Argus as well as the editor. He continued to write almost up to the moment of his death: the morning after he died while on vacation on the Olympic Peninsula, two envelopes arrived at the Argus offices containing a travelogue of his last journey.

He was succeeded as owner and managing editor of The Argus by his son Harold D. Chadwick. He also had another son, Leslie.
