= Norm Maleng =

American lawyer (1938–2007)

King County Prosecuting Attorney
- In office January 3, 1979 – May 24, 2007
- Preceded by: Chris Bayley
- Succeeded by: Dan Satterberg

Personal details
- Born: September 17, 1938 Acme, Washington, U.S.
- Died: May 24, 2007 (aged 68) Seattle, Washington, U.S.
- Party: Republican
- Spouse: Judy Maleng
- Children: 2
- Education: University of Washington
- Occupation: Attorney

Norman "Kim" Maleng (September 17, 1938 – May 24, 2007) was an American attorney and politician who served as the King County Prosecuting Attorney for 28 years. He was also an architect of Washington's Sentencing Reform Act.

== Early life and education ==
Maleng was born in Acme, Washington, and grew up on a dairy farm. Known as "Kim" during his youth, he graduated from the University of Washington in 1960, then served as a lieutenant in the United States Army. He earned a Juris Doctor in 1966 from the University of Washington Law School, serving as editor-in-chief of the Washington Law Review and graduating at the top of his class.

== Career ==
He worked in private practice in Seattle, and then as chief of the Civil Division of the Prosecutor's Office. In 1978, he was elected as Prosecutor, and was re-elected seven times.

Maleng was involved in a number of high-profile cases, including the 1983 Wah Mee massacre, the 2006 Seattle Jewish Federation shooting committed by Naveed Afzal Haq, child sexual abuse allegations against King County Superior Court Judge Gary Little, and the serial murders of Gary Ridgway.

Maleng's office made several controversial decisions not to prosecute various University of Washington football players over his tenure as King County Prosecuting Attorney, for alleged offenses that ranged from battery to sexual assault. His office declined to prosecute Jerramy Stevens for sexual assault, announcing on October 24, 2000, that no charges would be brought forward. Around 2008, Maryann Parker, the detective investigating the case, said: "I thought [Jerramy] should have been charged. I think most people in the Police Department thought he should have been charged. From the police perspective, I think there was overwhelming evidence that a crime had occurred. And then I think we should have left it to a jury to decide. I think we just felt, in our unit and in the Police Department as a whole, that this case was handled differently. And we felt it was because he was a University of Washington football star.”

He ran for the Republican nomination for Governor of Washington in 1988 and 1996. In 1992, he lost an election for Attorney General to Christine Gregoire.

Maleng is credited with bringing several large scale policy reforms to Washington State's Criminal Justice system including passage of the 1984 Sentencing Reform Act, tougher penalties for car thefts in 2007 and rethinking the prosecution of low level drug offenses by placing emphasis on treatment options after a first or second offense, rather than lengthy prison sentences.

Attorneys who worked for Maleng as deputy prosecuting attorneys include Marsha J. Pechman, Robert S. Lasnik and Ricardo S. Martinez, all judges of the U.S. District Court for the Western District of Washington, and Dan Satterberg, his successor

Maleng supervised the wrongful prosecution and conviction of Steve Titus in 1981. Titus was convicted based upon evidence manufactured by Port of Seattle police, with the knowledge of prosecutors. The conviction was overturned after the deception was exposed by a Seattle Times reporter, Paul Henderson.

== Death and honors ==
Maleng died of cardiac arrest during an event at the University of Washington on May 24, 2007. In December 2007, the King County Regional Justice Center in Kent, was renamed in his honor.

In June 2008, Harborview Medical Center opened Norm Maleng Building on its campus.

Legal offices
Preceded by Chris Bayley	King County Prosecuting Attorney; 1978-2007	Succeeded by Dan Satterberg
