= City Hall Park (Seattle) =

Park in Seattle, Washington, U.S.

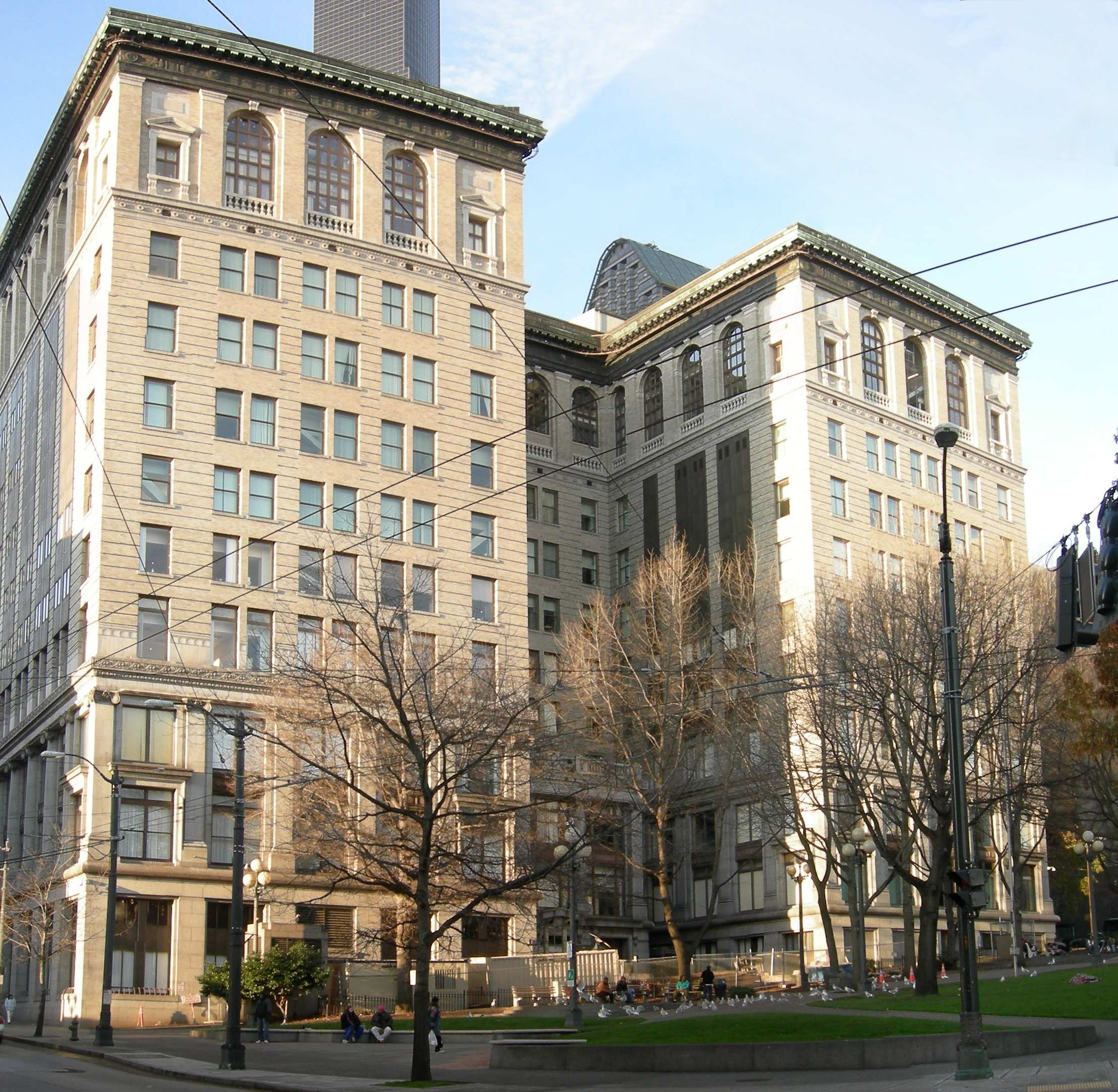
- Looking across City Hall Park to the King County Courthouse.
- Type: Urban Park
- Location: Seattle, Washington
- Coordinates: 47°36′06″N 122°19′49″W
- Area: 1.3 acres (0.53 ha)
- Operated by: Seattle Parks and Recreation

City Hall Park, also known as Courthouse Park, is a 1.3-acre (0.53 ha) park in the Pioneer Square neighborhood of Seattle, Washington, United States.

The total area of the park is divided into a block bounded by 3rd Avenue on the southwest, Dilling Way on the southeast, 4th Avenue on the northeast, and the King County Courthouse on the northwest. The site was formerly a Coast Salish settlement that was damaged during the Battle of Seattle in 1856.

It took the name City Hall Park because when it was laid out in 1911, the King County Courthouse was the County-City Building, housing both Seattle and King County government. The second Seattle city hall was located on the park site and nicknamed the "Katzenjammer Castle" for its makeshift nature; city offices moved out of the county courthouse in 1962.

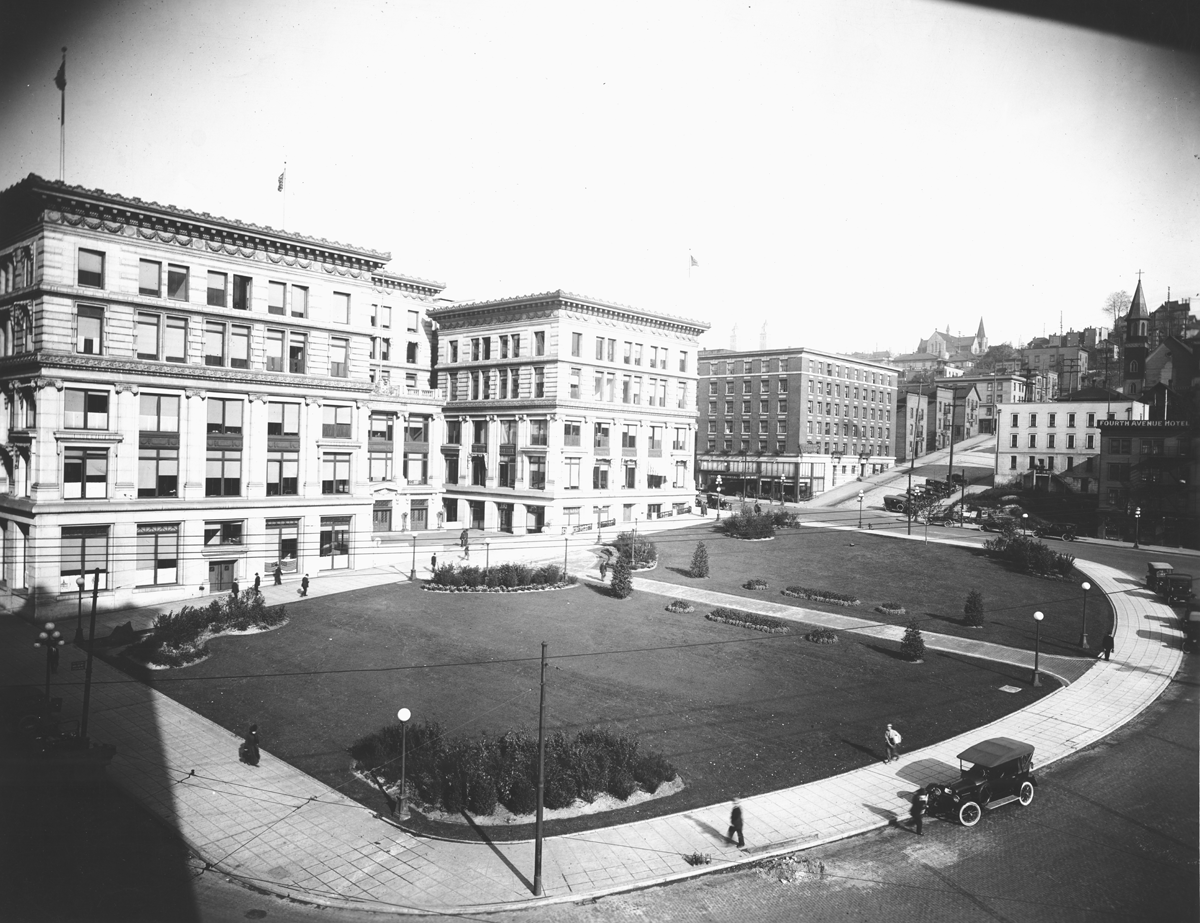
The park in 1917

The park underwent a minor renovation in 1917 and a major $25,000 renovation during the Century 21 Exposition in 1962, during which benches, a rose garden, and red pavement were added. It had originally been earmarked for use as a staging area by crews renovating the county courthouse building, but intervention from a Parks Board members spurred new investment into "downtown's only green space". The county government had also unsuccessfully proposed the conversion of the park into a parking lot in 1945 as a part of land swap for Duwamish Head. City Hall Park, nicknamed "Muscatel Meadows", had previously been used by the city's homeless population, who remained after the renovation in 1962. Another set of renovations was proposed in the 1990s to "clean up" the park.

The park had a 70-person homeless encampment until it was removed by Seattle Parks and Recreation in August 2021 following a letter signed by 33 King County Superior Court judges was transmitted to the city government. The letter had been written in response to crimes that affected courthouse operations for employees and jurors. City Hall Park was subsequently fenced off for cleaning and remained closed for over a year. The King County government proposed a land swap to transfer control of the park to them in November 2021, which drew criticism from several King County Council members and advocacy groups. The county council approved the transfer and explored proposals to prevent the park from becoming an encampment again, including a courtyard with permanent fencing, a hygenie station, and monitoring from the King County Sheriff's Office. The transfer was cancelled in October 2022 after a Seattle City Council vote against the proposal.

City Hall Park reopened to the public on June 13, 2023, following restoration of the lawn and stationing of a permanent park ranger. The full renovation project is expected to last until 2024 and cost $2.3 million. A nightly art installation by Craig Walsh named "Monuments" debuted at the park in September; it consists of video interviews of Coast Salish people projected onto the trees in City Hall Park.
