= The Argus (Seattle) =

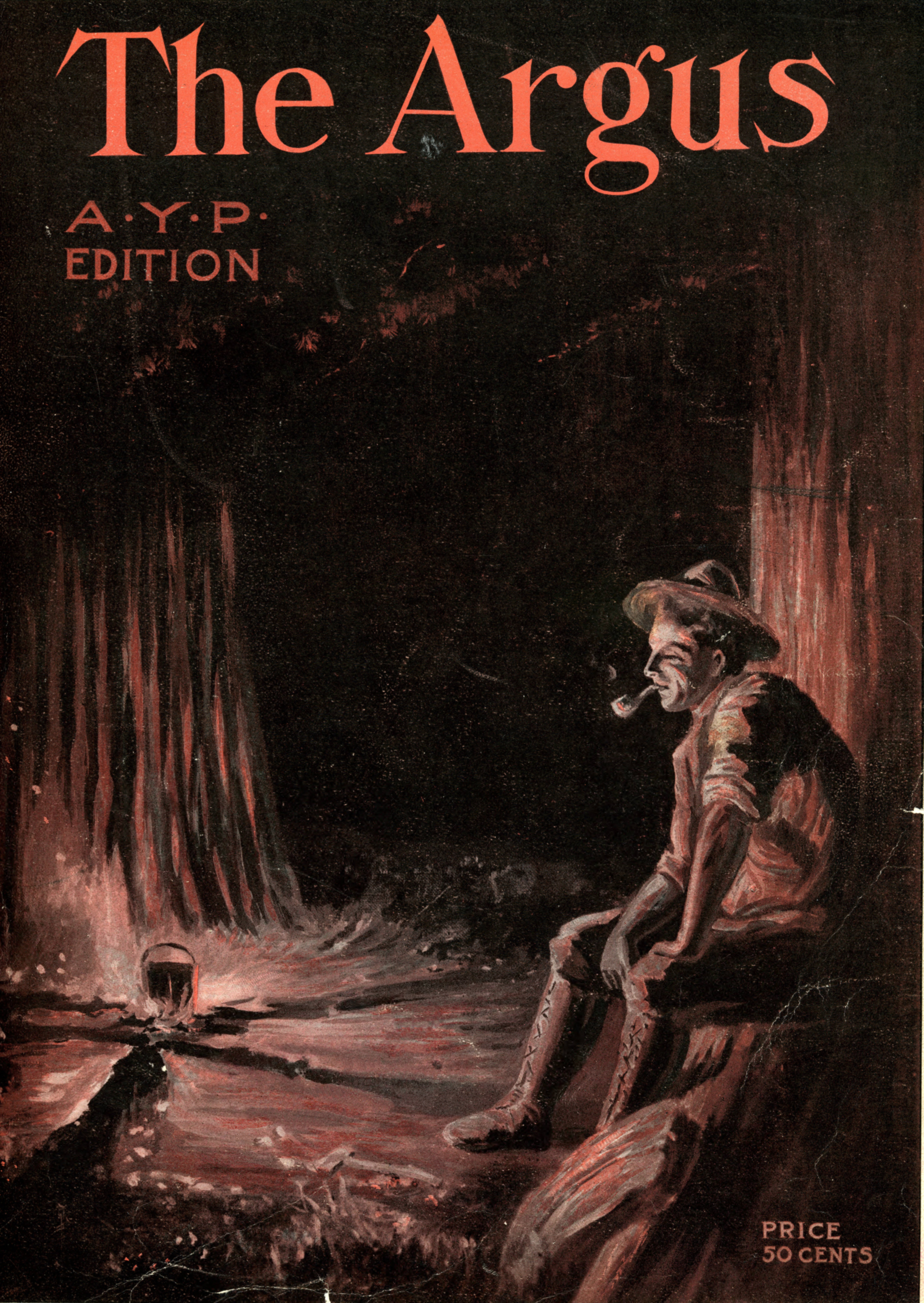
Cover of the edition of The Argus produced for the Alaska-Yukon-Pacific Exposition in 1909.

The Argus was a longstanding Seattle, Washington weekly newspaper. Founded in February 1894 and published until November 1983, it had a satiric bent and was aligned with the Republican Party. The paper was founded by A. T. Ambrose; six weeks later, Henry Chadwick bought a half interest. Ambrose died in 1900; Chadwick continued to operate the paper until 1934.

In the early 20th century, The Argus favored municipal ownership of utilities and public transit. While primarily the voice of the city's professional and business classes, it also supported moderate trade unionism. During the Chadwick era, the paper was "virulently anti-Japanese and anti-Black" and opposed women's suffrage.
