= John W. Wilhelm =

John W. Wilhelm is an American trade unionist. He was elected president/hospitality industry of UNITE HERE at the union's founding convention on July 9, 2004. He was elected president on June 30, 2009, at the union's first constitutional convention.

Previously, Wilhelm became president of HERE on August 1, 1998, elected by the union's general executive board to fill a vacancy, and was elected to a full term at the union's 43rd general convention, July 17, 2001.

During his HERE presidency, Wilhelm furthered the union's reputation as an organizing union, and achieved net growth after more than 25 years of membership decline. The union also substantially diversified its national leadership, including election in 2001 of the union's first women general officers, its first general officer of color, its first Asian-American vice president, significant increases in the number of African-American, Latino, and women vice presidents, and its first elected Canadian director.

Since 1999, he was the chairman of UNITE HERE Health. He is a trustee of the National Retirement Fund, the Consolidated Retirement Fund, and the Southern Nevada Culinary and Bartenders Pension Fund. He serves as a board member of the Brookings Institution and the Catholic Legal Immigration Network, Inc., and is a member of the AFL-CIO executive committee and executive council.

Wilhelm retired from UNITE HERE in 2012, closing out 40 years of union work and leadership for working people and families.

Wilhelm is a first cousin of New York City Mayor Bill de Blasio.

== See also ==
- Culinary Workers Union
- Hotel Workers Rising
- Union of Needletrades, Industrial and Textile Employees (UNITE)

Trade union offices
| Preceded by Edward T. Hanley | President of the Hotel Employees and Restaurant Employees Union; 1998–2004 | Succeeded by Union merged |
| Preceded by Bruce Raynor | President of UNITE HERE; 2009–2012 | Succeeded by D. Taylor |
