= Richard Hedreen =

Property developer, art collector and donor

Richard C. Hedreen
- Born: Richard Castle Hedreen; April 15, 1935 (age 91)
- Education: University of Washington
- Occupations: Hotel owner Property developer Art collector
- Years active: 1963-present
- Known for: Luxury hotels in Seattle, WA; art collection; largest gift of art to an American university
- Board member of: Seattle Art Museum
- Spouse: Elizabeth "Betty" Ann Petri Hedreen (1936-2022) (m. 1957)
- Children: 4

Richard Castle Hedreen (born April 15, 1935) is an American property developer and art collector based in Seattle, Washington. He is chairman of R.C. Hedreen Co., which he founded in 1963. R.C. Hedreen Co. has built the Seattle Hilton, the Grand Hyatt, the Madison Renaissance Hotel, the Olive 8, the Hyatt Regency Seattle and other Seattle skyscrapers. On March 13, 2024, Seattle University announced that Hedreen would be donating his entire art collection, valued at $300 million, to the university to create the Seattle University Museum of Art. The Hedreen gift is considered to be the largest gift of art ever made to a university.

== Early life and education ==
Richard Castle Hedreen was born on April 15, 1935, to Nona Castle (1912–2010) and Guy Noble Hedreen (1909–1993), who worked for an insurance company. He is the younger brother of Guy Michael Hedreen, who was born in 1933.

He attended Garfield High School, and played on the golf team, participated in the ski club and was a junior class representative.

Hedreen attended the University of Washington and graduated in 1957 with a Bachelor's of Science degree in civil engineering. On October 26, 1957, he married Elizabeth "Betty" Ann Petri, a graduate of Seattle University.

== Career ==
=== 1960s–1980s ===
In 1963 Hedreen began developing properties in Seattle. He built the 11-story Harbor House apartment building in Queen Anne for $1.6 million. Later that year he was named a board member of the Home Builders' Association of Greater Seattle. In 1967 Hedreen began building the 24-story Washington Park Tower in the Madison Park neighborhood. It took several years for permits to be issued for the structure after community protestors petitioned Seattle City Council to change rezoning laws and delayed construction.

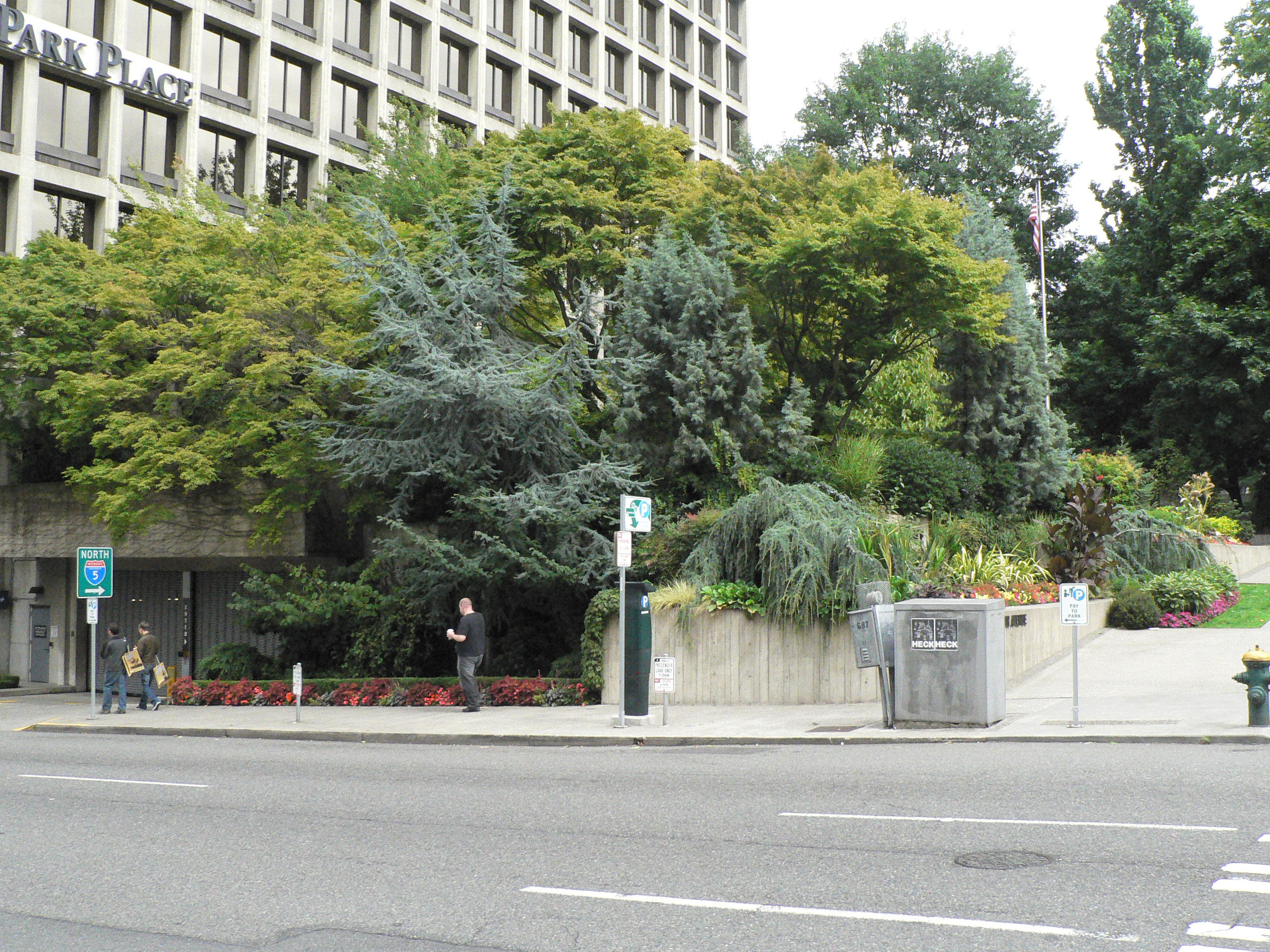
Freeway Park grounds with the Park Place building and parking garage entrance (left)

In 1969 Hedreen began building the 27-story Seattle Hilton Hotel in downtown Seattle. Initially permitted as a 10-story parking garage adjacent to the Washington Athletic Club, Hedreen revealed that the structure was really the Hilton after Seattle interim-mayor Floyd C. Miller announced plans for nearby Freeway Park, part of the Forward Thrust initiative. Hedreen was developing the 22-story Park Place building on the site of the park. Miller and Hedreen reached an agreement where Hedreen would help develop the park and underground parking and still be allowed to build the Park Place building. Hedreen also opposed the City Council's decision to convert the nearby Wilhard Hotel into low-income housing for senior citizens. The $10 million Hilton Hotel opened in November 1970. Hedreen built the Crown Plaza Hotel (then called the Park Hilton) in 1979 and sold it to Holiday Inn for $32.5 million in 1983; and the Madison Renaissance in 1983.

Hedreen was elected to the Seattle Art Museum (SAM) board of trustees in 1978, serving as chairman for the museums' Westlake construction committee that oversaw the construction of Westlake Mall, and disputed with mayor Charles Royer over who would develop it. In 1989 Hedreen purchased the historic Music Hall theatre with plans to demolish it and build a 31-story hotel. Community activists, led by Allied Arts of Seattle, attempted to preserve the entertainment venue as a historic landmark, but it was demolished in 1992 and is currently an office building. Hedreen sued the city for $10 million after the activists delayed the project.

=== 1990s–2020s ===
By the mid-1990s downtown Seattle's commercial building boom had slowed down. In 1992 Hedreen's Jefferson Square, a mixed-use apartment building in West Seattle, was foreclosed upon by Washington Mutual over an $18 million debt. Built in 1987, it had low occupancy and was criticized for being "ugly." In 1996 Hedreen's company replaced Trammel Crow as the developer of a $144 million expansion of the Washington State Convention and Trade Center.

In 2001 Hedreen developed the Elliot (later the Grand Hyatt) luxury hotel. A city ordinance allowed property developers "to exceed size limits on buildings if they agree to pay for low-income apartments, day care or open space as part of the project." Hedreen had $6 million worth of "unused and expired bonus credits" from the convention center expansion and construction of the Elliott. In 2002 Hedreen hired land-use attorney Ryan Durkan and lobbyist Jamie Durkan (children of politician Martin Durkan and siblings of future Seattle mayor Jenny Durkan) to petition Seattle City Council to allow Hedreen to apply those credits for future projects. This was criticized for costing the city $6 million of affordable housing. The union "Hotel Employees and Restaurant Workers Local 8" protested the ordinance; Council member Nick Licata was vocally opposed, stating "He made a deal, and he wants the city to recoup the losses." The legislature passed the council vote 5–3, with Peter Steinbrueck abstaining. The ordinance extended the life of the credits from 3 years to 20 and allowed it to be transferable between properties. Affordable housing activists, Licata and the union pressured mayor Greg Nickels to veto the legislature. Nickles was elected as a pro-union candidate and received opposition from hotel owners; but shortly after Nickels was sworn in Hedreen contributed to the mayors 2005 re-election campaign. Nickles vetoed the legislature, stating "changing the land-use rules for the sole benefit of one party is bad public policy." This was considered a major win for organized labor, which had attempted to negotiate with Hedreen to allow his hotel employees to organize a union in exchange for support of the legislature, which Hedreen rejected. The veto was criticized by Walt Crowley of Allied Arts and Hedreen argued that he had made a "handshake deal" with former mayor Norm Rice to transfer the credits. The mayor's veto caused controversy for city council members; Judy Nicastro spoke publicly against Nickles and the union, whom she called bullies. Nicastro and fellow council member Heidi Wills were criticized for supporting the Hedreen legislation after being elected as left-wing, pro-affordble housing candidates. Both Nicastra and Wills lost their re-election bids after the Strippergate scandal.

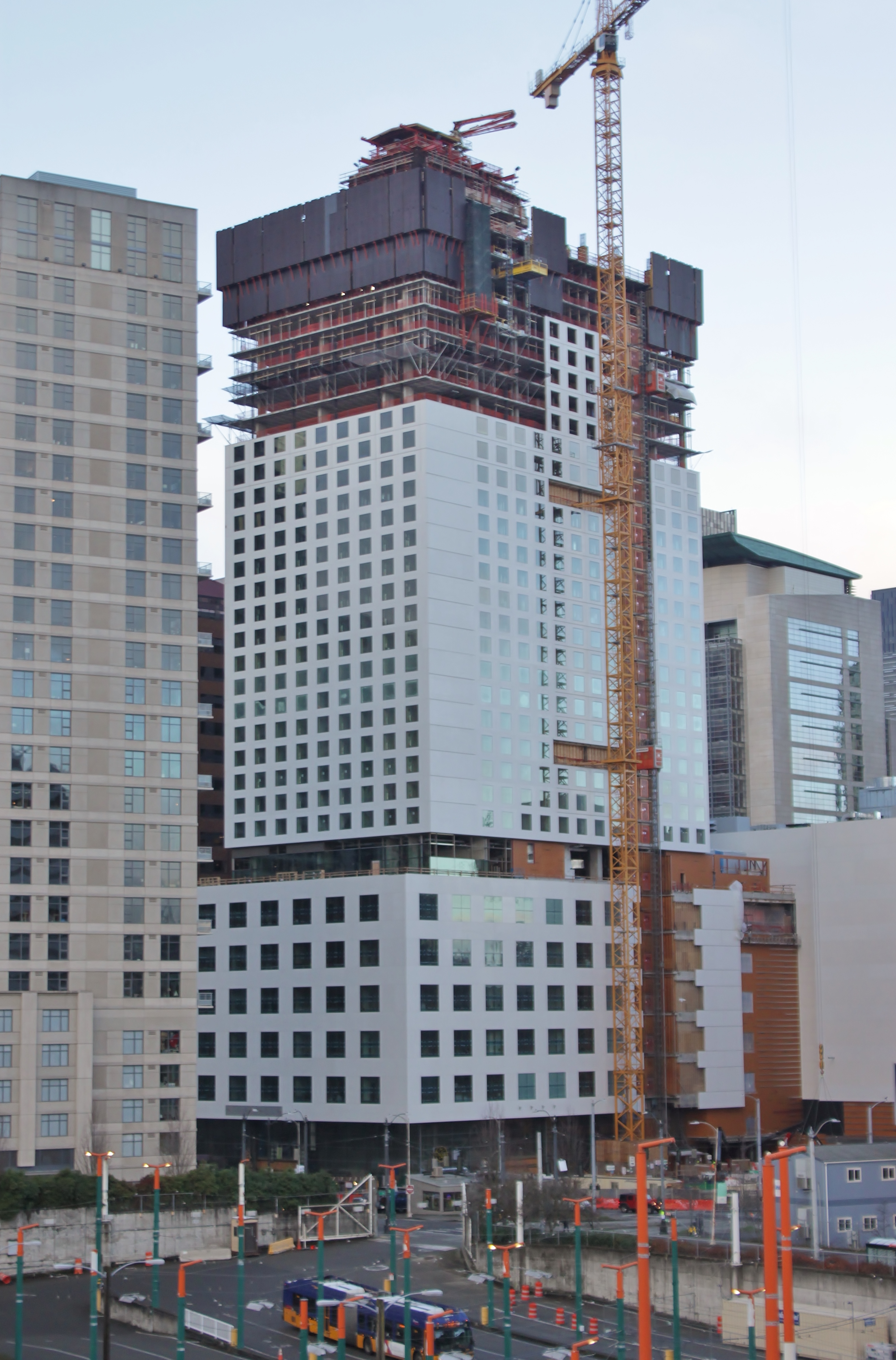
The Hyatt Regency Seattle under construction in 2017.

Later in 2002 Hedreen and other SAM board members reached a deal with Washington Mutual to build the 42-story WaMu Center adjacent to the museum, tripling SAM's size. In 2005 Hedreen began construction on the Olive 8 building, utilizing Gluckman Tang Architects (a design firm better known for its work on art museums). In 2015 Hedreen began building the 45-story Hyatt Regency Seattle. He bought part of the land (site of the city's historic Greyhound Lines bus station) in 1995 and tried for years to develop it. In 2012 he purchased an adjacent plot of land and planned to develop the entire L-shaped parcel into one large 50-story building, but in 2015 building permits were revoked after pressure from hotel workers union Unite Here Local 8. Called the "Hedreen loophole", the combination of the two lots would have increased ground floor space and allowed Hedreen to not pay $3 million towards affordable housing. In a press conference outside the site, Seattle City Council member Mike O'Brien called for an audit and stated "They're [the city auditor] going through to ensure that we, the people of Seattle, are getting every penny we deserve.” The remainder of the property is proposed to be the 34-story 824 Howell hotel building, currently being reviewed.

In 2014 employees of the Hyatt attempted to negotiate unionizing with Hedreen through Unite Here Local 8, but no deal was reached. In 2017 Hedreen was part of the Seattle Hospitality for Progress PAC and Washington Hospitality PAC's lawsuit against the city over Initiative 124, a voter approved legislation which gave "hotel workers more protections against sexual harassment and assault." Seattle mayor Jenny Durkan was criticized by Unite Here Local 8 for not taking a stand against the lawsuit, and received $50,000 from the PACs ($20,000 from Hedreen) during her mayoral campaign. Initiative 124 was overturned by the Washington State Court of Appeals in 2018.

In 2018 Hedreen opposed the Seattle head tax, which would have raised $50 million per year to fund homeless services. In 2019 he was part of CASE, the Seattle Metropolitan Chamber of Commerce's PAC, which donated money to pro-business candidates during the City Council election. Its members included Martin Selig, Amazon and Hedreen and unsuccessfully opposed pro-union candidates like Tammy Morales, Kshama Sawant and District 7's Andrew J. Lewis (whom Unite Here Local 8 supported).

In 2021 Hedreen donated to the campaign to recall Seattle city council member Sawant. The recall failed. He also donated to the campaign of Ann Davison for Seattle City Attorney in November 2021.

== Art collector ==
Hedreen and his wife Betty are well-known art collectors. Their collection of old master, modern, and contemporary art has included works by Pablo Picasso, Jasper Johns, and Anselm Kiefer. They have appeared on the ARTNews list of the world's top art collectors. The Hedreens were members of MOMA's International Council and the Trustee Council of the National Gallery of Art.

A billionaire, Hedreen was audited in 1984, and again in 2004 when Washington state auditors issued him a fine for "$25 million, including penalties and interest, for the previous four years' worth of art purchases." The Tom Otterness sculpture "The Miser" was displayed outside the lobby of Hedreen's Grand Hyatt Hotel, and has been called the "worst statue in Seattle." In 2015 the Hedreen's donated James Rosati's sculpture Loo Wit to the Jesuit-run Seattle University, where it is displayed outside on the campus grounds.

In 2011 Hedreen purchased a Frans Hals painting from Sotheby's for $10 million. In 2016 the painting was found to be a forgery and Hedreen was refunded.

In 2021, he sold David Hockney's California landscape Nichols Canyon (1980) for $41 million at Phillips auction house.

The Hedreens have made gifts of artworks to many institutions, including the National Gallery of Art, Seattle Art Museum and Seattle University. The Seattle Art Museum and Seattle University have galleries named in honor of the Hedreens.

On March 13, 2024, Seattle University announced that Hedreen would be donating his entire art collection, valued at $300 million, and twenty-five million dollars to the university to create the Seattle University Museum of Art. The gift is considered to be the largest gift of art ever made to a university, the largest gift in Seattle University's history, and one of the largest gifts ever made to a university in the United States. The Hedreen Collection consists of more than 300 pieces of art, including paintings, sculptures, etchings, and photographs by Berenice Abbott, Élisabeth Vigée Le Brun, Henri Cartier-Bresson, Cecily Brown,Willem de Kooning, Lucian Freud, Thomas Gainsborough, Robert Indiana, Rashid Johnson, Roy Lichtenstein, Jan Lievens, Irving Penn, Jacopo da Pontormo, Robert Rauschenberg, Amy Sherald, Louis Stettner, Titian, Andy Warhol, Anna Weyant, and others. His gift made in honor of his late wife, Elizabeth "Betty" Ann (Petri) Hedreen (1936–2022), a Seattle University alumna who fought multiple sclerosis for fifty-five years, and to acknowledge the Jesuits in the arts.

In 2026 it was announced that a group of works from the Hedreen collection, selected in consultation with Seattle University, would be sold at five auctions by Sotheby's, New York, in November 2026 and February 2027. The works consigned for auction included a Mater Dolorosa by Titian, Portrait of Sigismund Baldinger by Georg Pencz, The Sacrifice of Isaac by Bartolomeo Cavarozzi, The Birth of Venus by Gaetano Gandolfi, and Reflections on “Painter and Model” by Roy Lichtenstein.

On April 30, 2024, the Hedreens were inducted into the Jesuit Honor Society.

== Personal ==
Hedreen has four children: Guy Michael Hedreen II, an art history professor at Williams College; Elizabeth "Betsy" H. Hill; Jane M. Hedreen, designer and owner of Flora & Henri, who is married to David Thyer, president of R.C. Hedreen Co.; and Carl W. Hedreen.

He is the grandfather of eleven grandchildren: Estelle, Olivia, Guy, Rose, Ricky, Graham, Ellie, Clayton, George, Gavin, and Frances.

== See also ==
- Loo Wit
