= Wendy Mazaros =

American author

Wendy Mazaros (formerly Hanley) is an American author and former spouse of individuals involved in organized crime. She gained public attention in the late 1970s for her connection to the murder of Las Vegas labor leader Al Bramlet and later published a memoir detailing her experiences.

== Life ==
On February 24, 1977, Las Vegas labor leader Al Bramlet was murdered in an execution-style shooting. Wendy Hanley, who was reportedly married to labor organizer and hitman Tom Hanley, was implicated in the crime. She was indicted on June 17, 1977, by a Clark County grand jury as an accessory to murder. Investigators found that she possessed clothing and jewelry belonging to Bramlet and had directed them to sites where these items were buried.

On March 9, 1978, Wendy Hanley pleaded guilty to a gross misdemeanor charge of preventing the administration of justice. This charge was reduced from the original indictment. Her husband, Tom Hanley, and his son, Gramby, pleaded guilty to first-degree murder in connection with Bramlet's death.

The nonfiction book Vegas Rag Doll: A True Story of Terror and Survival as a Mob Hitman's Wife, co-authored by Joe Schoenmann and Mazaros, was published in fall 2011. It is an autobiography of Mazaros' marriage to Tom Hanley, 39 years her senior, who was involved in organized crime in Las Vegas. MyNews 3 wrote, in a story about the book, "She is Wendy Mazaros, a woman so connected to the mob and so well known that in the 1970s the newspapers simply referred to her as Wendy." Tod Goldberg, in a critical review for Las Vegas CityLife, called the book "an unremorseful account of being married to a hitman."

In later years, Mazaros, as she became known, appeared on panels discussing the lives of women connected to organized crime. During public events, she claimed that Tom Hanley had trained her as a hitwoman, a statement met with skepticism by some commentators. She also alleged that Hanley was involved in the disappearance of Jimmy Hoffa and the assassination of John F. Kennedy, though these claims were not substantiated.

Mazaros had a daughter, Amy Hanley, with Tom Hanley. Her daughter later revealed aspects of their family life, including Wendy's subsequent marriage to another man with alleged mob ties, Robert Peoples. Mazaros stated that Tom Hanley had coerced her into writing a suicide note, which she described as part of a pattern of threats and control.
