= Bill Fagaly =

American art historian and curator

William Arthur Fagaly (March 1, 1938 – May 17, 2021) was an American art historian and curator.

== Early life and education ==
Born in Lawrenceburg, Indiana, Fagaly attended Indiana University Bloomington, initially aiming to become a chemist. Influenced by his sister, he redirected his studies to art history, earning a bachelor's degree and subsequently a master's degree in African art history in 1967 under Dr. Sieber. His academic work included studies on 19th- and 20th-century Western art with Albert Elsen.

== Career ==
In 1966, Fagaly joined the Isaac Delgado Museum of Art in New Orleans (now the New Orleans Museum of Art) as registrar and later served in various roles, including curator and assistant director. During his tenure, he expanded the museum's African art collection to approximately 600 pieces by the time of his retirement in 2016. Fagaly organized numerous exhibitions, both locally and nationally, and was involved in founding the Contemporary Arts Center in New Orleans in 1976. He also contributed to the establishment of Prospect New Orleans in 2008.

Fagaly also served as a guest curator at several institutions, including the American Folk Art Museum in New York, the Corcoran Gallery of Art, and the Portland Art Museum.

After his death, his personal art collection was auctioned to establish the William A. Fagaly Memorial Fund for Social Impact.

== Bibliography ==
- The Nightcrawler King: Memoirs of an Art Museum Curator (2021)
