= Al Bramlet =

American labor leader

Elmer "Al" Bramlet (February 18, 1917 – February 1977) was a labor union leader. He was the secretary-treasurer of Las Vegas Culinary Workers Local 226 and President of the Nevada AFL–CIO. Bramlet was one of the most powerful figures in Nevada, as he was able to shut down the Las Vegas tourism business through the use of labor strikes. He was murdered in 1977, allegedly because of a dispute over money involving the attempted bombing of two restaurants that Bramlet was trying to unionize.

== Early life ==
Al Bramlet was born on a farm near Jonesboro, Arkansas. After serving in the United States Navy, he moved to Los Angeles and became a bartender, later serving as a business agent for a bartenders local union. In 1946, he moved to Las Vegas and joined Culinary Workers Union Local 226. In 1954, he became its secretary-treasurer.

== Union activities ==
Under Bramlet's leadership, the Culinary Workers Union Local grew from 1,500 members to 22,000 at the time of his death. Bramlet was known for his aggressive efforts in organizing workers. In 1958, he tried to get the owner of the Alpine Village Restaurant to let the workers unionize. When the owner refused, the union picketed the restaurant for almost twenty years.

The Culinary Workers Union initiated a strike against Downtown Las Vegas hotel-casino owners in 1967, which closed 12 hotels and lasted for six days. A strike against hotels on the Las Vegas Strip in 1970 lasted for four days. In 1976, the Culinary Workers Union, along with three other unions, held a strike lasting 15 days against 15 large hotel-casinos in Las Vegas. Twelve of the hotel-casinos closed down during the strike.

Bramlet had various disputes with the parent union, Hotel Employees and Restaurant Employees Union (HERE), which had connections with the Chicago Outfit. Edward T. Hanley, president of HERE, tried to get control of the local's union health and welfare funds. The Chicago Outfit's enforcer, Tony Spilotro, had Bramlet beaten up when he refused. Spilotro also tried to get the union to enroll in a mob-controlled dental plan.

In December 1975, two bombs exploded on the roof of the Alpine Village Restaurant. In January 1976, a bomb exploded at David's Place, a nonunion restaurant in Las Vegas. In January 1977, unexploded bombs were discovered in cars outside the Village Pub and the Starboard Tack restaurant.

== Death ==
On February 24, 1977, Bramlet was kidnapped at McCarran International Airport by Tom Hanley, his son Gramby Hanley, and Clem Eugene Vaughn. Three weeks after Bramlet disappeared, two hikers discovered Bramlet's body in the desert near Potosi Mountain (Nevada). He had been shot six times, including once in each ear.

Gramby Hanley and Tom Hanley were arrested and pleaded guilty to Bramlet's murder and received life sentences. Clem Eugene Vaughn testified against the Hanleys and received a lesser sentence. The Hanleys said that Bramlet had refused to pay them a $10,000 fee for the attempted bombings of the Village Pub and the Starboard Tack restaurant because the bombs had failed to go off. While they kidnapped Bramlet, they tried to get him to send $10,000 to Binion's Horseshoe Casino; however, the money was never picked up. Tom Hanley died in 1979 while in federal custody. Gramby Hanley entered the United States Federal Witness Protection Program in prison, after giving testimony regarding the bombings and union activities.

== Afterwards ==
In March 1977, the United States Department of Labor took control away from the trustees of the Southern Nevada Culinary and Bartenders Pension Trust, which was the pension fund for Culinary Workers Local 226 and the local bartenders union. The Department of Labor said that this was because the pension fund had made unsafe loans, primarily to Morris Shenker, totaling over 60% of the fund's assets. Shenker was the owner of the Dunes (hotel and casino) and an associate of organized crime figures. Shenker eventually defaulted on these loans and declared bankruptcy in 1984. Gramby Hanley testified that Bramlet received kickbacks of between $1 million and $1.5 million for approving the loans to Shenker.

Bramlet was succeeded as secretary-treasurer of the Culinary Union local by Ben Schmoutey. Schmoutey then turned over control of the local's union health and welfare funds to the parent union in Chicago, and enrolled the union in a mob controlled dental plan. Schmoutey was acquitted in 1979 on charges related to the restaurant bombings. He was defeated for reelection in 1981 by Jeff McColl. During the election, several associates of Spilotro, including Herbert Blitzstein, tried to intimidate union members to vote for Schmoutey. In 1987, Schmoutey was convicted on fraud charges for trying to collect kickbacks from a union health insurance company, and sentenced to five years in prison.

== See also ==
- List of homicides in Nevada
