= Workers United =

North American trade union

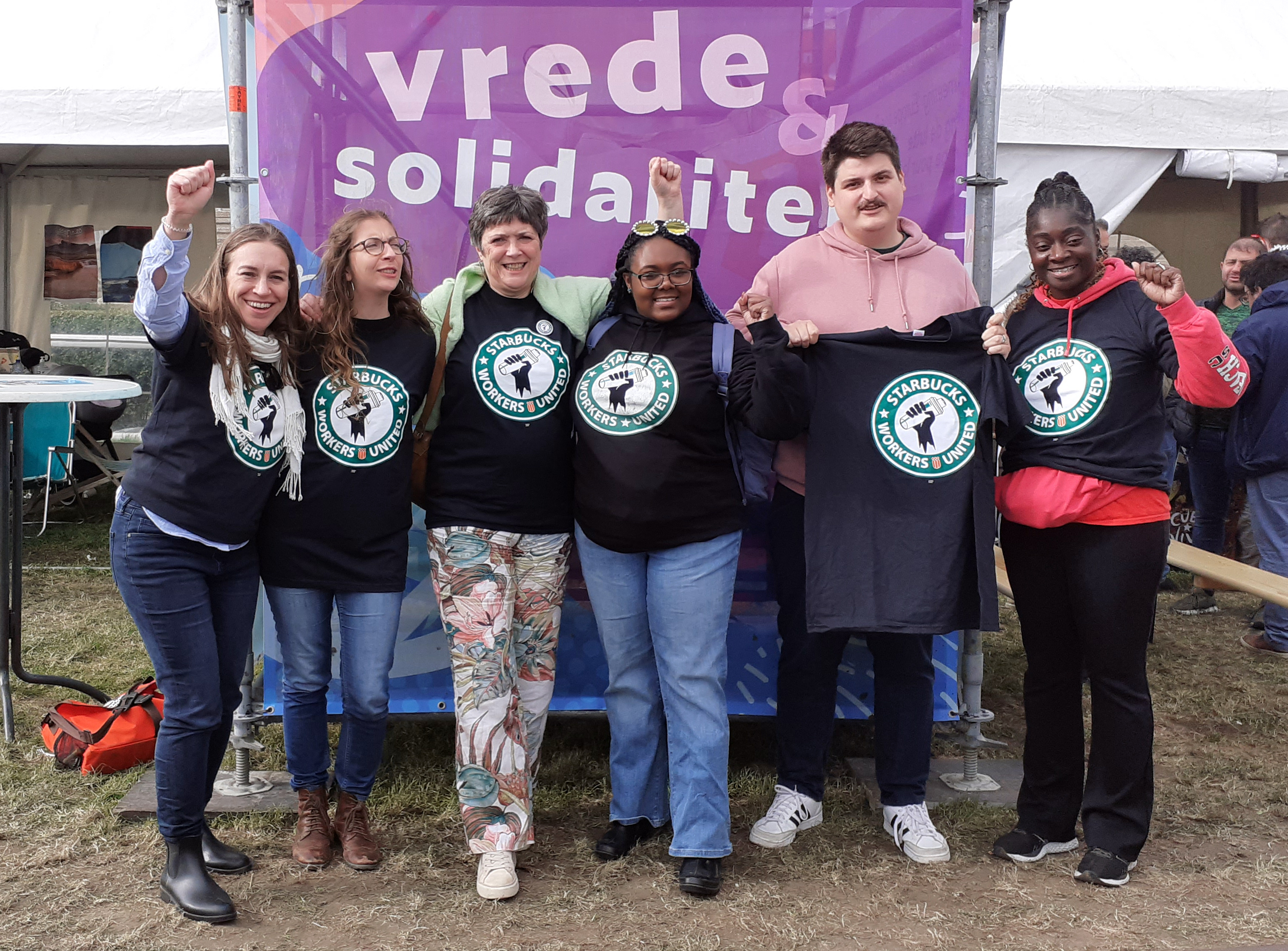
- Starbucks Workers United members, 2022
- Predecessor: UNITE HERE
- Founded: March 24, 2009
- Headquarters: Philadelphia
- Location: United States, Canada
- Members: 85,965 (2013)
- Key people: Lynne Fox, President; Edgar Romney, Secretary-Treasurer
- Affiliations: Service Employees International Union
- Website: workersunited.org

Membership (US records)
View source data.
Finances (US records; ×$1000)
View source data.

Workers United is an American and Canadian labor union which represents about 86,000 workers in the apparel, textile, commercial laundry, distribution, food service, hospitality, fitness and non-profit industries. It was established in its current form in 2009 and is affiliated with the Service Employees International Union (SEIU).

== History ==
The union dates its origin as 1900 with the creation of the International Ladies Garment Workers Union and 1914 with the creation of what became the Amalgamated Clothing and Textile Workers Union. The two unions merged in 1995 to become Union of Needletrades, Industrial and Textile Employees (UNITE), which in turn merged with Hotel Employees and Restaurant Employees Union (HERE) to form UNITE HERE in 2004. However, many of the locals that had been with UNITE were dissatisfied with the UNITE HERE merger.

After a lengthy and divisive internal leadership struggle within UNITE HERE, the union's then-president Bruce Raynor led 100,000 members of the union's membership (primarily in its apparel division, who had formerly been in UNITE) in disaffiliating from the national union on March 24, 2009, formed a new union called Workers United, and affiliated the union with Service Employees International Union (SEIU). The first president of the new union was Edgar Romney, a former UNITE HERE elected official. On May 30, Bruce Raynor resigned as president of UNITE HERE, Romney resigned as president of Workers United, and Raynor was named Romney's successor.

In May 2009, the New York Daily News reported that Workers United was running a deficit of $300,000 a month, the deficit was expected to widen, that SEIU had loaned the union $1 million to shore up its finances, and that Workers United was considering asking SEIU for $1.3 million a month and suspension of all dues payments in order to keep Workers United solvent. The media later reported that an internal Workers United memo admitted that membership was closer to 100,000 than 150,000 and that membership was falling as employers refused to honor contracts with the union. An SEIU official confirmed that the loan had been made. However, on July 9, 2009, the National Labor Relations Board held that Workers United was the bargaining agent for contracts at five major employers (Continental Linen Services, Premair of Cleveland, Gateway Packaging Co., Associated Hotels Duluth, and American Etc. Inc. d/b/a Royal Laundry).

Workers United won a significant organizing victory in the U.S. apparel manufacturing industry in July 2010. The workers, with the support of state politicians and Hollywood stars, won a contract and successfully pressured the employer to keep the plant open.

SEIU and UNITE HERE agreed to end their dispute on July 25, 2010. As part of the agreement, ownership of the Amalgamated Bank was transferred to Workers United. UNITE HERE retained ownership of the union's headquarters in New York City and an additional $75 million in assets. The agreement also settles a jurisdictional dispute over which workers the unions will organize. UNITE HERE agreed to restrict its organizing in the food service industry to those workers at airline caterers, airports, businesses, convention centers, and athletic stadiums, while SEIU and Workers United would restrict its organizing activity in the industry to food service workers in state and local government, health care facilities, and prisons. Both unions continue to organize food service workers in elementary, middle, and secondary schools and in higher education. The two unions had also disagreed over whether several thousand members of Workers United had been given the opportunity to choose which union they wished to belong. In the new agreement, SEIU and UNITE HERE agreed to let an arbitrator decide to which union the workers wished to belong to.

== Presidents ==
2009: Edgar Romney
2009: Bruce Raynor
2011: Noel Beasley
2016: Lynne Fox

== See also ==
- Starbucks Workers United
