= D. Taylor =

US labor union leader

Donald "D." Taylor (born 1956 or 1957) is an American labor unionist.

Born in Williamsburg, Virginia, Taylor was named after his father, Donald, but was always known simply by his initial, "D". Taylor began working part-time for Kentucky Fried Chicken when he was 14 years old, and later attended Georgetown University, as finances permitted. In 1979, while working as a waiter in Washington DC, he joined the Hotel Employees and Restaurant Employees Union (HERE), soon becoming a shop steward.

In 1980, Taylor began working full-time for the Culinary Workers Union, a local of HERE, based in Lake Tahoe and Reno, Nevada. In 1984, he was transferred to Las Vegas, to lead a major strike. Although the strike was unsuccessful, the union grew rapidly. He also established the Culinary Training Academy. In 2002, he became secretary-treasurer of the Culinary Workers Union.

In 2004, HERE merged into the new UNITE HERE union, and Taylor became a vice-president of the union, with responsibility for gaming. He then became the union's general vice president in 2009, and in 2012 was elected as its president. As the leader of the union, he has focused on increasing union membership, especially in right to work states, and advocating for immigrant workers.

Trade union offices
Preceded by Jim Arnold	Secretary-Treasurer of the Culinary Workers Union; 2002–2012	Succeeded by Geoconda Argüello-Kline
Preceded by John W. Wilhelm	President of UNITE HERE; 2012–2024	Succeeded by Gwen Mills
