= Loo Wit =

Sculpture in Seattle, Washington, U.S.

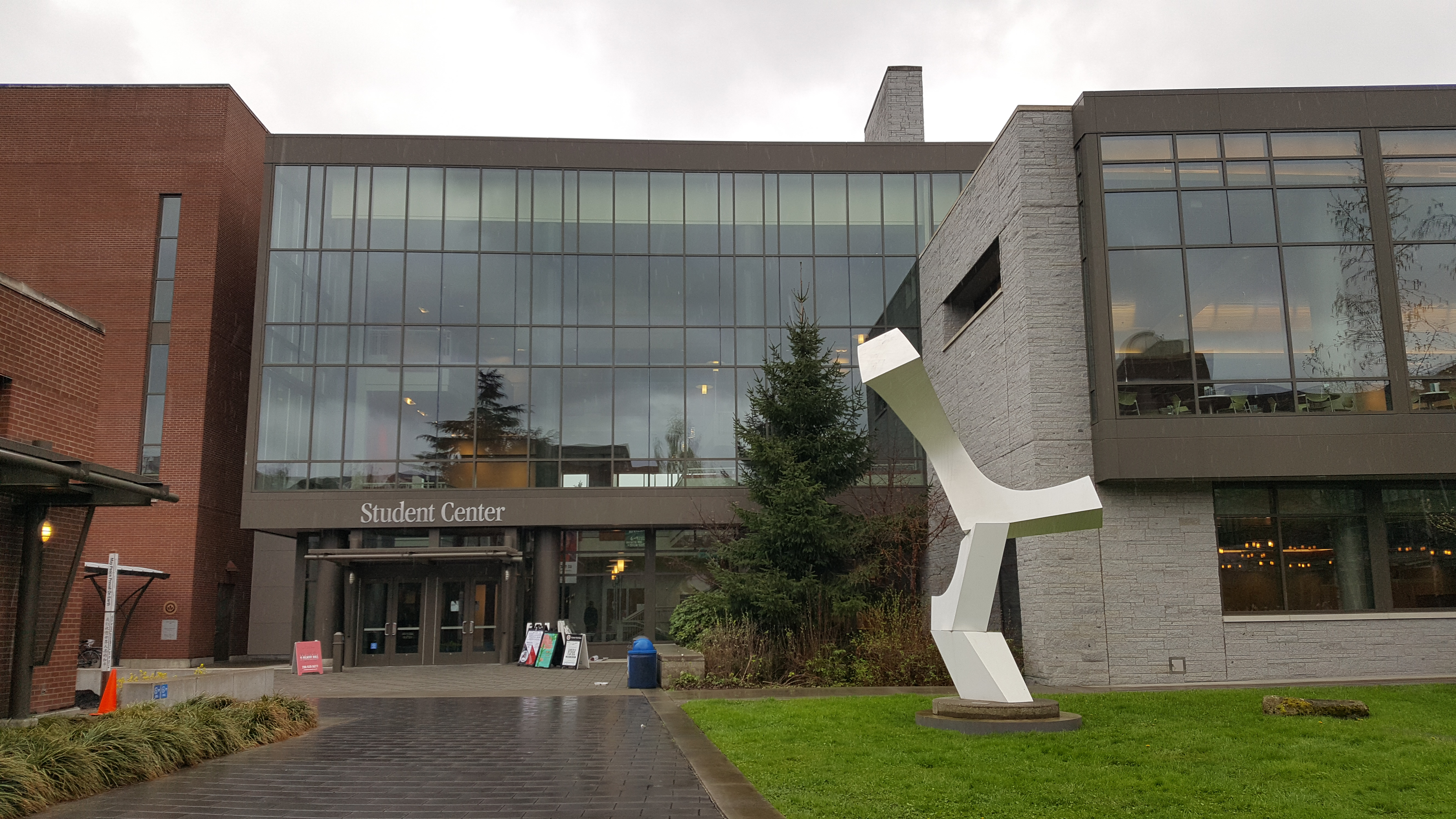
- The sculpture installed outside the Student Center on the Seattle University campus in 2018
- Artist: James Rosati
- Location: Seattle, Washington, U.S.
- 47.608612°N 122.318070°W

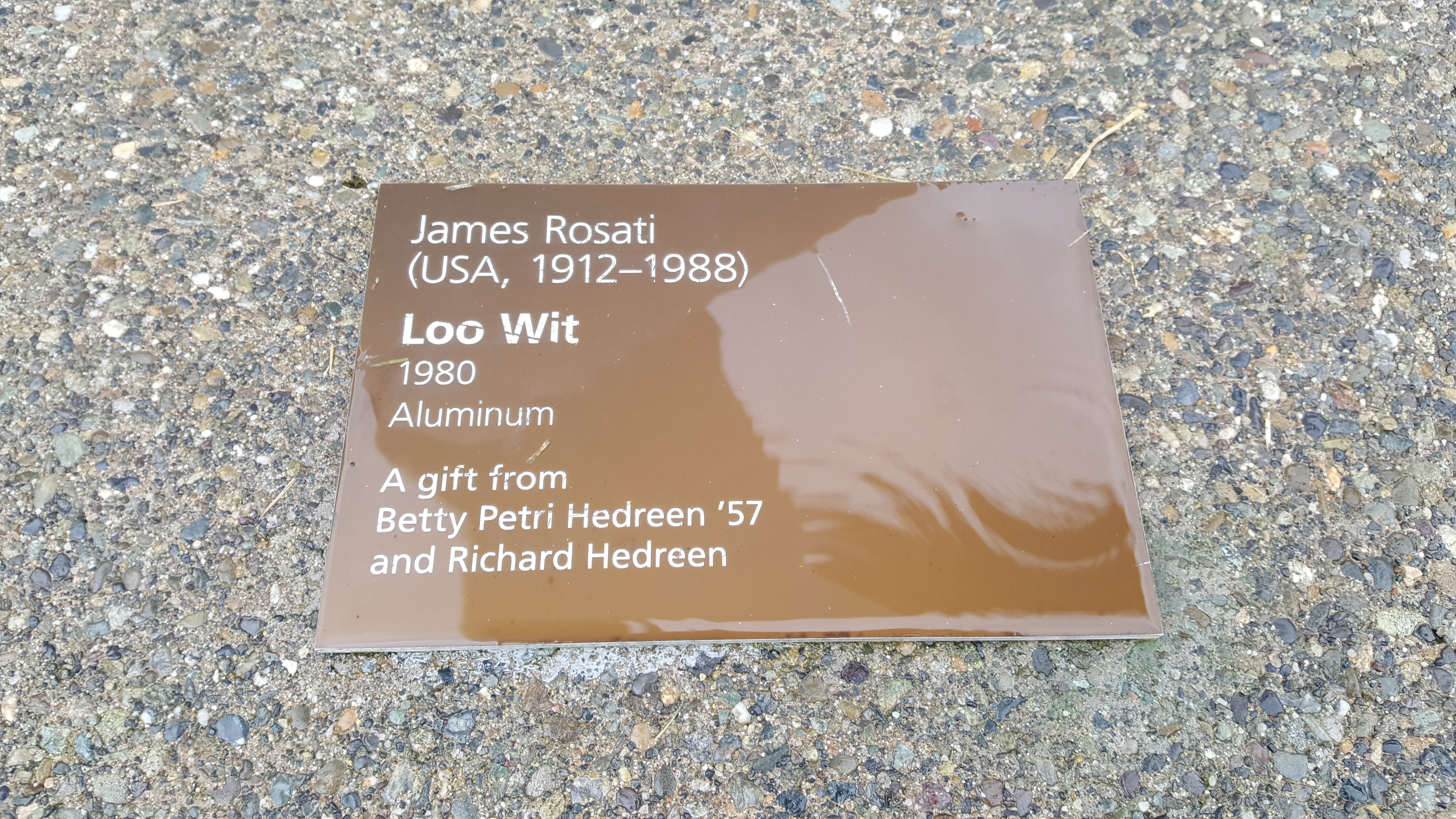
Plaque for the sculpture

Loo Wit is an outdoor 1975–1976 sculpture by James Rosati, currently installed at the Seattle University campus in Seattle, Washington.

== Description ==
The 16-foot (4.9 m) tall abstract sculpture is made of enameled aluminum, and rests on a concrete base.

== History ==
Loo Wit was purchased by Richard Hedreen, the developer of the Holiday Inn Crowne Plaza Hotel (113 6th Avenue); Hedreen installed the sculpture outside the hotel in 1980. The work was installed at Seattle University on August 31, 2015, after being gifted by Hedreen and his wife, Betty Petri Hedreen.

== See also ==
- 1976 in art
