= Bruce S. Raynor =

American labor union executive

Robin Wolaner
- Born: 1954 (age 71–72)
- Education: Cornell University
- Occupations: Entrepreneur, business author
- Employer: CNET
- Known for: Founder of Parenting magazine and TeeBeeDee
- Title: Director of Credo Mobile

Bruce S. Raynor is an American labor union executive. He is the former Executive Vice President of the Service Employees International Union (SEIU), former President of Workers United, former General President of UNITE HERE, a founding member of the Leadership Council of the Change to Win Federation (CTW), and a member of the Cornell University Board of Trustees. He was Chairman of several union-affiliated national pension and insurance funds. He was Chairman of the Board of Amalgamated Life Insurance Company, a union-affiliated insurance company established in 1943. Raynor also served as chairman of the Amalgamated Bank, the only union-owned bank in the U.S., and as former co-chair and current member of the Council of Institutional Investors, an organization of institutional investors. Raynor is also President of The Sidney Hillman Foundation, a foundation that supports and rewards socially conscious journalism.

In April 2011, Raynor resigned his positions with Workers United and SEIU. Raynor is now the principal of R & S Associates, a consulting firm based in New York. He is the President Emeritus of Workers United and continues as the President of the Sidney Hillman Foundation.

== Union organizer ==
Radicalized through student activism and the civil rights movement, Raynor began his work in the labor movement in 1973 in the education department of the former Textile Workers Union of America. He was involved in a multi-year campaign to organize the Southern textile company J.P. Stevens, which was dramatized in the 1979 film Norma Rae. This was a comprehensive campaign that was innovative in its use of community- and church-based organizing.

Based in Atlanta, he went on to organize tens of thousands of workers in the South, including nearly 1,000 Lichtenberg Curtain and Drapery workers in Georgia, 500 shirt workers in Crystal Springs, Mississippi, 3,200 Tultex workers in Martinsville, Virginia, and the giant Cannon Mills complex in Kannapolis, North Carolina. He eventually became the elected leader of 50,000 Southern clothing and textile workers. Raynor has collective bargaining relationships with companies including Levi Strauss & Co., Liz Claiborne, T.J. Maxx/Marshall's, the Hartmarx Group, Xerox, Delaware North, Hilton, Starwood, and national food service and laundry industry employers such as Aramark, Compass and Sodexo.

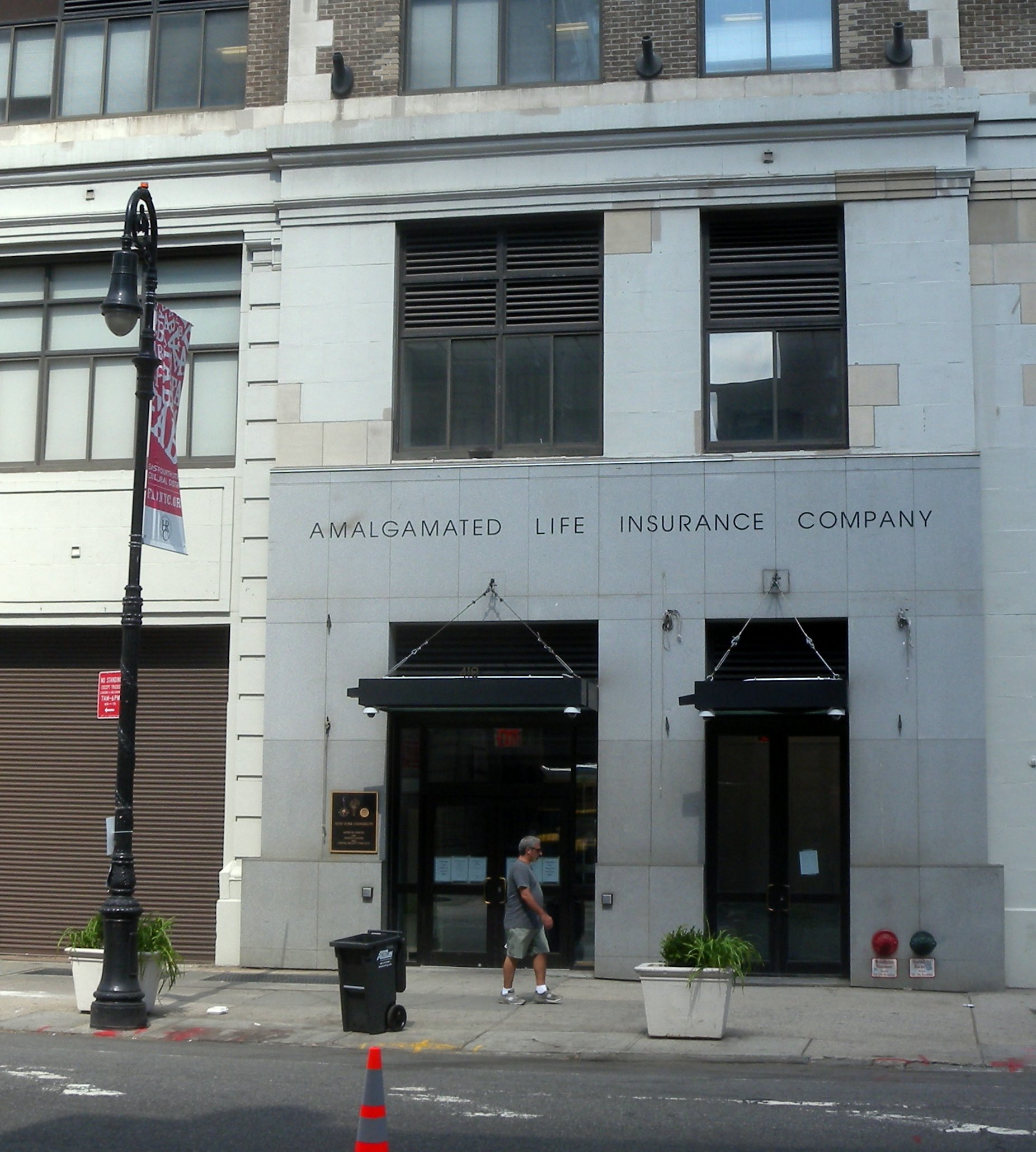
Amalgamated Life Insurance

Raynor is a graduate of the Cornell University School of Industrial and Labor Relations (class of '72) where he gave up a biochemistry scholarship to pursue a career in the labor movement.

In 2009, Raynor resigned as president of UNITE HERE and became president of Workers United. Representing 150,000 workers, some of whom had voted to leave UNITE HERE, this new union included the majority of former UNITE members, some former members of HERE, and a number of workers who had been organized since the merger. Many of these members returned to UNITE HERE after a drawn out dispute with SEIU was settled. Workers United affiliated with SEIU and Raynor was elected to the additional position of executive vice president of SEIU. After two years of service, Raynor resigned from his positions at Workers United and its parent union, SEIU. In April 2011, Raynor resigned as chairman of Amalgamated Bank, though he remained on the bank's board and retained chairmanship of the Amalgamated Life Insurance Company.

== Family ==
Raynor's father worked as a truck driver and laborer; he died of a heart attack at age 48. Raynor's mother worked in retail.

Raynor's older brother, Harris Raynor, also graduated from Cornell (class of '69) and is the southern regional director of Workers United and an international vice president of SEIU.

Raynor is twice divorced and lives in Nyack, New York, with his wife Joan. They have five children.

Trade union offices
Preceded by Jay Mazur	President of the Union of Needletrades, Industrial and Textile Employees; 2001–2004	Succeeded by Union merged
Preceded by Union founded	President of UNITE HERE; 2004–2009	Succeeded by John W. Wilhelm
Preceded by Edgar Romney	President of Workers United; 2009–2011	Succeeded by Noel Beasley
