= The Sidney Hillman Foundation =

American awards organization for journalism

Sidney Hillman Foundation
- Formation: 1946
- Type: Nonprofit 501(c)(3)
- Tax ID no.: 13-5550943
- Legal status: Active
- Headquarters: New York, New York
- Methods: Journalism awards
- President: Bruce S. Raynor
- Executive Director: Alexandra Lescaze
- Subsidiaries: The Sidney Award, The Hillman Prize
- Revenue: $430,000 (2024)
- Expenses: $553,000 (2024)
- Website: www.hillmanfoundation.org

The Sidney Hillman Foundation is an American charitable foundation that awards prizes to journalists who investigate issues related to social justice and progressive public policy. The foundation, founded in 1946, is named for Sidney Hillman, who was the founding president of the Amalgamated Clothing Workers of America and founder of the Congress of Industrial Organizations. The foundation awards the annual Hillman Prize in the United States and Canada, and the monthly Sidney Awards. The Foundation was headed by Bruce S. Raynor, former Executive Vice President of the SEIU, as of 2010.

== Hillman Prize ==
The Hillman Prize
- Awarded for: Journalism, social justice
- Country: United States
- Presented by: The Sidney Hillman Foundation
- First award: 1950
- Website: hillmanfoundation.org/hillman-prize

The Hillman Prize is a journalism award given out annually by the foundation. It is given to "journalists, writers and public figures who pursue social justice and public policy for the common good." It recognizes journalists and public figures in traditional and new media forms.

Past winners include both established and emerging figures in their fields, as well as organizations. Murray Kempton was the first recipient in 1950. As of 2018, each winner receives $5,000. In 2005, winners received $2000 and a plaque.

The prize is awarded annually in the categories of: Book, Broadcast, Magazine, Newspaper, and Opinion & Analysis.

== George Barrett Award ==
In 2015, the foundation created the George Barrett Award and gave it to Bryan Stephenson, founder and executive director of the Equal Justice Initiative. In 2024, it was given to Professor Philippe Sands of the University College of London 'for his tireless work to secure clients' rights, redress colonialism, and protect the environment.'

== Sidney Award ==
The Sidney Award is a monthly journalism award given out by The Sidney Hillman Foundation to "outstanding investigative journalism in service of the common good” from the previous month. The Sidney Award was launched in 2009.

The Foundation announces the winner on the second Wednesday of each month. Recipients are awarded $500 and a certificate designed especially for the Sidney by New Yorker cartoonist Edward Sorel. Nominations can be made by anyone.
