= Joe Schoenmann =

American journalist and author

- Born: Prairie du Sac, Wisconsin
- Occupations: Journalist, author
- Writing career
- Genre: Nonfiction
- Subjects: Las Vegas, Organized crime
- Notable works: Vegas Rag Doll: A True Story of Terror and Survival as a Mob Hitman's Wife
- Website: vegasragdoll.com/author/

Joe Schoenmann (born in Prairie du Sac, Wisconsin) is an American journalist and nonfiction author who has lived in Las Vegas since 1997.

== Education ==
Schoenmann graduated from River Valley High School in Spring Green, Wisconsin. He went on to graduate from the University of Wisconsin-Madison.

== Career ==
Schoenmann began his journalism career as a reporter at the Elroy Tribune-Keystone, a community weekly, taking his first daily newspaper job at the West Bend Daily News before moving to the Capital Times in Madison. In 1997, he worked as a reporter at the Las Vegas Review-Journal. He went on to work as a writer, then as managing editor, for Las Vegas Weekly, and, most recently, as a reporter at the Las Vegas Sun. In 2014, he became the senior producer of Nevada Public Radio's morning program, "KNPR's State of Nevada" at knpr.org . He is now the News Director and host of morning talk show.

== Awards ==
He was given the Outstanding Journalist award in 2002 and Story of the Year in 1998 by the Nevada Press Association, as well as four other awards in 2002 for his work at Las Vegas Weekly.

In 2004, he was the gold medal winner for Profile Writing in the 19th annual City and Regional Magazine Association (CRMA) awards competition for an article about an outcall service operator in Las Vegas Life magazine.

In 2013, his article about the Clark County Coroner's Office in the Las Vegas Sun won Best Feature in the Nevada Press Association contest. In 2014, his "Joe Downtown" columns in Las Vegas Weekly was awarded "Best Local Column" by the Nevada Press Association contest.

As a host of Nevada Public Radio's State of Nevada program titled "Tunnel Deaths" that Schoenmann produced and for which he interviewed a homeless man won a 2017 Gabriel Award, the second in Nevada Public Radio's history.

== Book ==
The nonfiction book Vegas Rag Doll: A True Story of Terror and Survival as a Mob Hitman's Wife, co-authored by Schoenmann with Wendy Mazaros and released in fall 2011, is an autobiography of Mazaros' marriage to Tom Hanley, 39 years her senior, who was involved in organized crime in Las Vegas. MyNews 3 wrote, in a story about the book, "She is Wendy Mazaros, a woman so connected to the mob and so well known that in the 1970s the newspapers simply referred to her as Wendy."

Tod Goldberg, in a critical review for Las Vegas CityLife, called the book "an unremorseful account of being married to a hitman."
