= Jay Mazur (labor union president) =

American labor leader (1932–2025)

President of the Union of Needletrades, Industrial and Textile Employees
- In office 1995–2001
- Preceded by: Union founded
- Succeeded by: Bruce Raynor

President of the International Ladies' Garment Workers' Union
- In office 1986–1995
- Preceded by: Sol Chaikin
- Succeeded by: Union merged

Personal details
- Born: May 21, 1932 New York City, U.S.
- Died: January 14, 2025 (aged 92) New York City, U.S.
- Spouses: Barbara Vogel (divorced); Connie Moak
- Children: 2
- Education: City College of New York; Rutgers University
- Occupation: Labor leader

Jay Mazur (May 21, 1932 – January 14, 2025) was an American labor leader who was the last president of the International Ladies' Garment Workers' Union (ILGWU), serving from 1986 to 1995, and the first president of the Union of Needletrades, Industrial and Textile Employees (UNITE), serving from 1995 to 2001.

== Early life and education ==
Jay Mazur was born to a Jewish family in the East Bronx on May 21, 1932, the son of Simon Mazur, a cloak maker and union man who emigrated from Poland to New York; his mother, Mollie, died when he was 11, leaving his father to raise four children - twin boys and two older girls. After graduating from Theodore Roosevelt High School in 1951, Mazur began work in the Health and Welfare Department of New York City's dressmaker's Local 22.

== Career ==
In 1955, Mazur entered the ILGWU's Training Institute, a 1-year intensive program to prepare students for staff appointments in the ILGWU, and was assigned as an organizer in the Upper South Department and the New England Region. After graduation in 1956, Mazur was assigned to Local 40, where he became Director of Organization and Education. In 1959, Mazur began working for Local 23, which later merged with Local 25 to become Local 23-25. Mazur began work as an organizer for the local in 1959, was elected as Assistant Manager in 1964, and manager in 1973.

Mazur became a Vice-President of the International in 1977. During his tenure in Local 23 and 23-25, Mazur was involved in major organizing efforts, as well as significant social and educational programs for union members. He was manager of Local 23-25 in 1982, when thousands of workers in New York City's Chinatown went on strike to win a fair contract. Under his leadership, Local 23-25 established an Immigration Project to assist members and their families with legal and related immigration issues. While working for the union, Mazur earned his an undergraduate degree in Personnel and Labor Studies from City College of New York, and later a master's degree in Labor Studies from Rutgers University.

In 1983, Mazur was elected to the International's leadership as Secretary-Treasurer, and in 1986, he was elected to succeed Sol Chaikin as President of the ILGWU. During his tenure as President, Mazur led major campaigns to stem the decline of garment manufacturing in the United States. This included the creation of the ILGWU's Professional and Clerical Employees (PACE) Division and the Metro Organizing Department, the expansion of the Immigration Project to be national in scope, and the establishment of workers centers in major metropolitan centers. Mazur served on the Executive Councils of the AFL-CIO, and the AFL-CIO's Industrial Union Department of the AFL-CIO; in addition to his work in domestic and international labor federations, he has also served on numerous foundation boards and government commissions. He was an opponent of globalization and spoke at the 1999 Seattle WTO protests.

Under Mazur's leadership, the ILGWU merged with the Amalgamated Clothing and Textile Workers of America to form the Union of Needletrades, Industrial and Textile Employees (UNITE) in 1995. He served as the first president of UNITE, from 1995 until his retirement in 2001. In addition to his work for the ILGWU and UNITE, Mazur served on the Executive Council of the AFL-CIO, as well as the Industrial Union Department of the AFL-CIO. He was a member of the Executive Committee of the Jewish Labor Committee and President of the 21st Century ILGWU Heritage Fund.

== Personal life and death ==
Mazur's first marriage, to Barbara Vogel, ended in divorce; they had two children. He later married Connie Moak. Mazur died from heart failure at his Manhattan residence, on January 14, 2025, at the age of 92.

== Sources ==
- Biography of Jay Mazur

Trade union offices
Preceded by Shelley Appleton	Secretary-Treasurer of the International Ladies' Garment Workers' Union; 1983–1986	Succeeded by Irwin Solomon
Preceded by Sol Chaikin	President of the International Ladies' Garment Workers' Union; 1986–1995	Succeeded by Union merged
Preceded by Union founded	President of the Union of Needletrades, Industrial and Textile Employees; 1995–2001	Succeeded by Bruce Raynor
