= Gertrude Lane =

American trade unionist (died 1953)

Gertrude Lane (died 1953) was an American trade unionist and labor organizer active in New York City from the 1930s. Lane led the Office Workers Union and held roles in the Hotel and Restaurant Employees and Bartenders International Union.

== Education and early career ==
Lane was a graduate of Hunter College. She had wanted to become a librarian but left college during the Great Depression and so had to find work as a waitress.

== Trade unionism ==
Lane was a leading member of the Office Workers Union (OWU) in New York, a white-collar union established in the early 1930s and affiliated with the Trade Union Unity League. She was the highest-ranking official in the union and was credited for highlighting the important role of women in labor struggles. In 1934, Lane was elected to the national committee of a conference held to look at establishing a national Office Workers Union. She was chairman of the strike committee during the OWU strikes at S. Klein and Ohrbach department stores in 1935. The OWU later merged into the United Office and Professional Workers of America (UOPWA).

Lane was also a founder of the Hotel and Club Employees Union, a local (Local 6) of the Hotel and Restaurant Employees and Bartenders International Union. She worked as its secretary-treasurer.

Lane was supportive of The Daily Worker and encouraged union members to subscribe to and read it. According to In These Times, there is evidence that Lane was a member of the national committee of the Communist Party of the United States although she was deemed "not currently of sufficient interest" to be added to the FBI's Security Index. Lane was recorded as attending the Communist Party convention in July 1945 in a report by John F. Cronin. Counterattack, an anti-communist newsletter, named Lane and her husband as communists in 1948 and announced it had sent information about Lane to Congress.

== Personal life and death ==
Lane was married to Jay Rubin, another trade unionist who was president of the New York Hotel Trades Council. Lane died in 1953 after a period of illness and was survived by Rubin who died in 1990.
