= Coast Seattle Downtown Hotel by APA =

Hotel in Seattle, Washington, U.S.

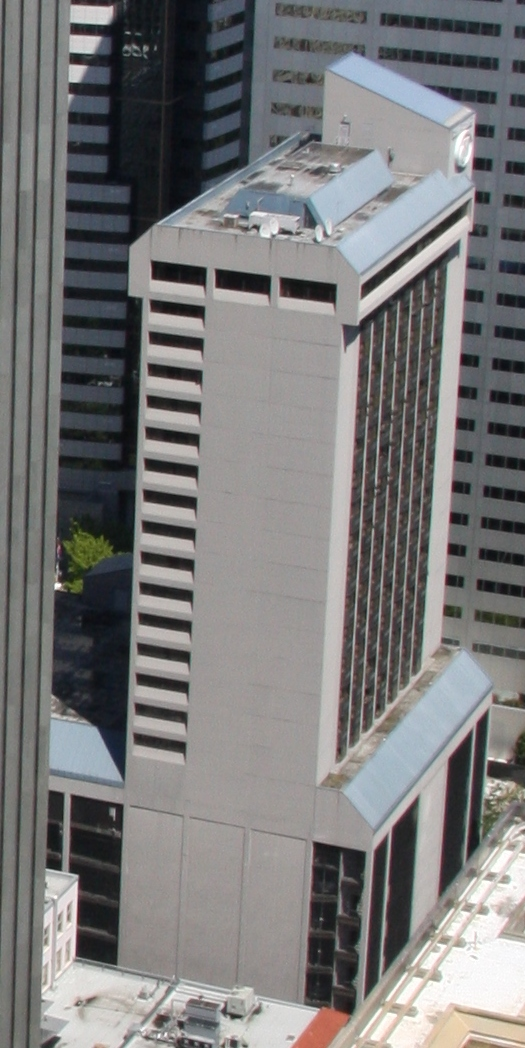
- Interactive map of the Coast Seattle Downtown Hotel by APA area

General information
- Location: Seattle, Washington, United States
- Coordinates: 47°36′33″N 122°19′59″W

The Coast Seattle Downtown Hotel by APA is a 14-story hotel in Seattle, in the U.S. state of Washington.

== History ==
The hotel was built by Seattle developer Richard Hedreen and opened on November 28, 1970 as The Seattle Hilton Downtown. It was later renamed the Hilton Seattle.

In July 2012, Stonebridge Cos., based in Englewood, Colorado, bought the hotel from R.C. Hedreen Co for $60 million. In October 2012, Boston-based AEW Capital Management purchased the hotel for $63 million. In 2016, New York-based Westbrook Partners purchased the hotel for $60.3 million.

In 2024, the Tokyo-based APA Hotel Co., Ltd. purchased the hotel in 2024 for $68.8 million. The hotel left Hilton and joined APA's wholly owned Coast Hotels division on June 13, 2024, renamed the Coast Seattle Downtown Hotel by APA.
