= Column I =

Steel sculpture by James Rosati

- The sculpture in 2018
- Artist: James Rosati
- Medium: Stainless steel sculpture
- Dimensions: 9.1 m (30 ft)
- Location: Stanford, California, United States
- 37.424818°N 122.167962°W

Column I is a 1983–1984 stainless steel sculpture by James Rosati, installed on the Stanford University campus in Stanford, California, United States. The 30-foot (9.1 m) abstract artwork was installed to commemorate Albert Elsen, an art history professor at Stanford for more than 25 years, who died in 1995. Elsen appreciated Column I and wanted the piece in Stanford's collection, but was unable to acquire the artwork before his death.

Stanford University Museum of Art's Lyn Cox said, "[The sculpture] has a good conversation with the palm trees around it. The palm trees say something about calmness and peacefulness in their own way, and 'Column I' responds in a similar but different way, resonating with them."

== See also ==
- 1984 in art
