= UNITE HERE =

North American labor union

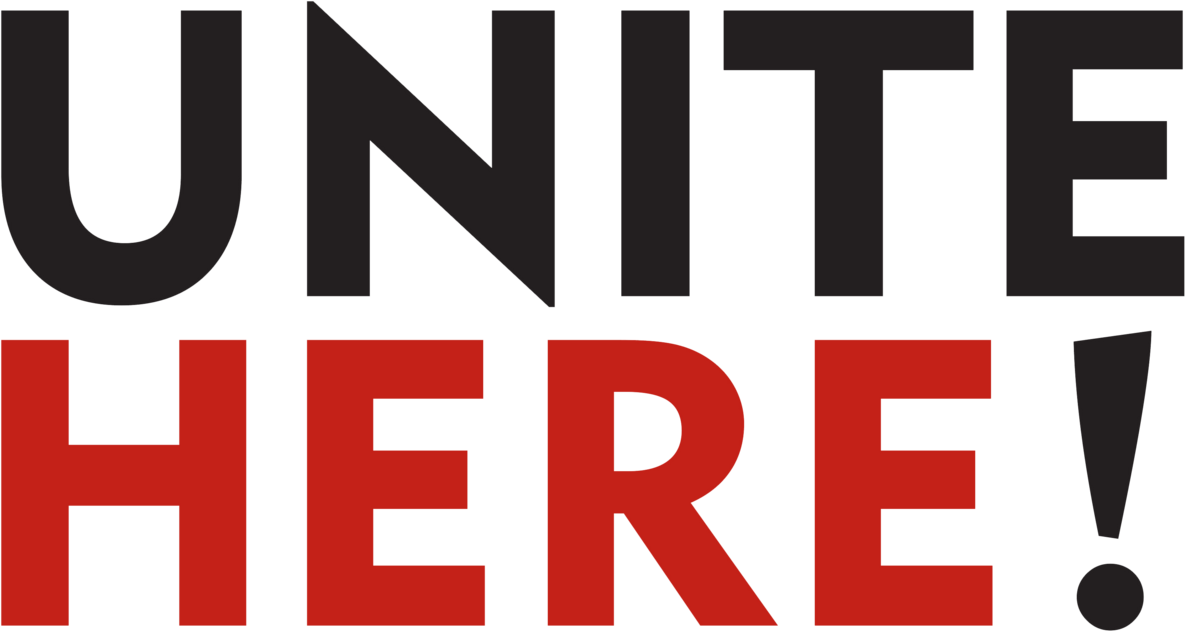
- Formation: July 9, 2004; 22 years ago
- Merger of: Union of Needletrades, Industrial and Textile Employees; Hotel Employees and Restaurant Employees Union
- Type: Trade union
- Headquarters: New York City, US
- Locations: Canada; United States
- Members: 301,886 (2018)
- President: Gwen Mills
- Secessions: Workers United
- Affiliations: AFL–CIO; Canadian Labour Congress
- Website: unitehere.org

UNITE HERE is a labor union in the United States and Canada with roughly 300,000 active members. The union's members work predominantly in the hotel, food service, laundry, warehouse, and casino gaming industries. The union was formed in 2004 by the merger of Union of Needletrades, Industrial, and Textile Employees (UNITE), and Hotel Employees and Restaurant Employees Union (HERE).

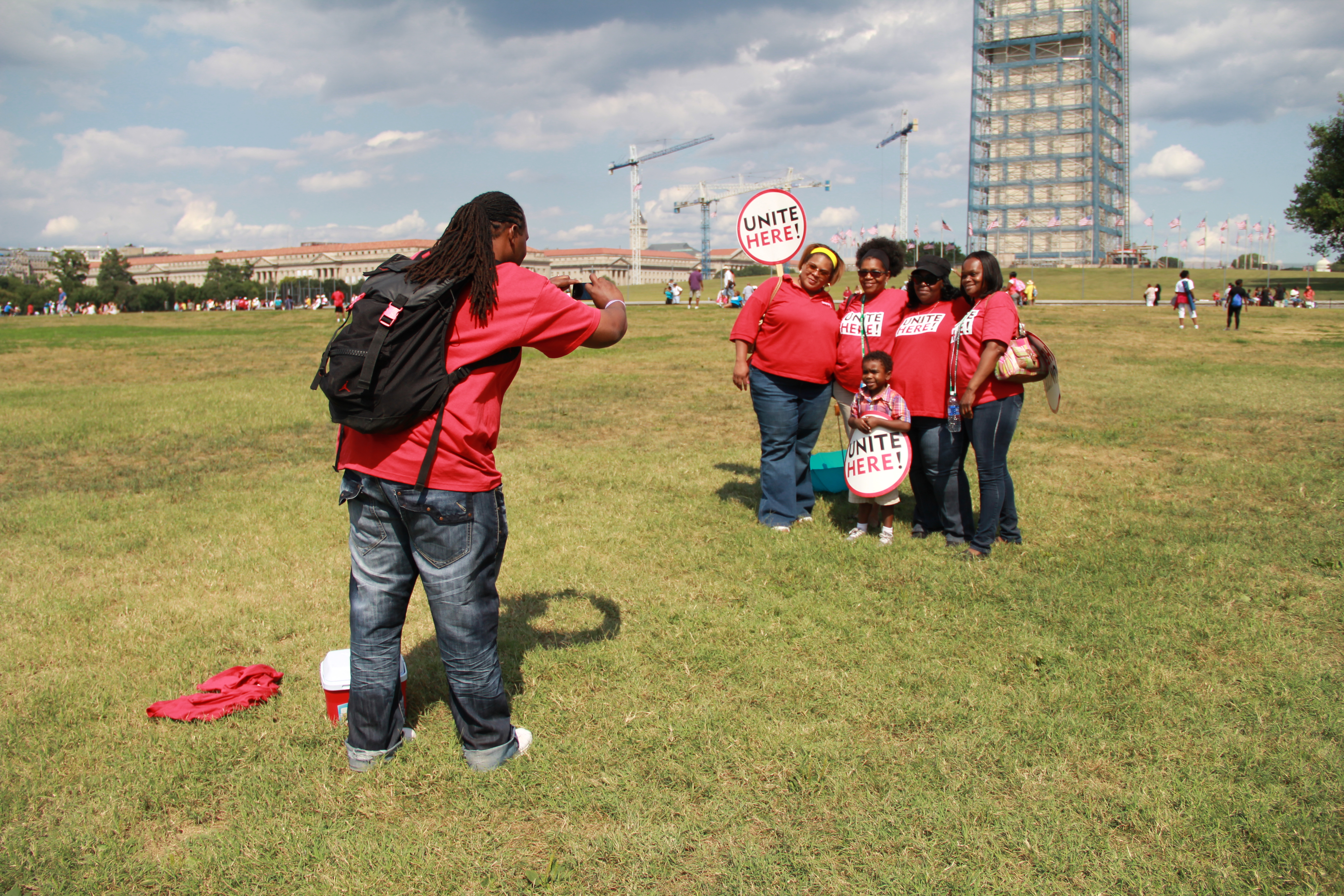
UNITE HERE members by the Washington Monument, at the 50th anniversary of the March on Washington for Jobs and Freedom

In 2005, UNITE HERE withdrew from the AFL–CIO and joined the Change to Win Federation, along with several other unions, including the Teamsters, Service Employees International Union (SEIU) and the UFCW. In May 2009, union president Bruce Raynor (originally from UNITE) left UNITE HERE, taking with him numerous local unions and between 105,000 and 150,000 members, mostly garment workers and a labor-owned bank, Amalgamated Bank. They formed a new SEIU affiliate called Workers United.

On September 17, 2009, UNITE HERE announced that it would re-affiliate with the AFL–CIO.

== History ==
Bruce Raynor, then president of UNITE, and John W. Wilhelm of HERE became close friends after meeting on a HERE picket line at Yale University in 2003. UNITE HERE was formed in 2004 by the merger of UNITE (the Union of Needletrades, Industrial, and Textile Employees) and HERE (Hotel Employees and Restaurant Employees International Union). The impetus for the merger was that UNITE was wealthy but losing a significant number of members, while HERE had little cash but had a large number of organizing opportunities which could lead to hundreds of thousands of new members. The merged entity had 440,000 active members and about 400,000 retired members in both the United States and Canada. Raynor was elected general president of the merged union and Wilhelm was named president of the merged union's hospitality division, but the two men shared executive, budgetary, and personnel duties.

In 2005, UNITE HERE withdrew from the AFL–CIO and joined the Change to Win Federation, along with several other unions, including the Laborers' International Union of North America, International Brotherhood of Teamsters, Service Employees International Union, United Farm Workers, and United Food and Commercial Workers. UNITE HERE Vice-President Edgar Romney was elected the first secretary-treasurer of the new labor federation.

=== Split and reaffiliation with AFL–CIO ===
The merger of UNITE and HERE faced initial difficulties due to disagreements between its leaders. By 2007, Raynor was accusing Wilhelm of stifling change, and Wilhelm was angry at Raynor's "heavy-handed" managerial style. Raynor's critics also said the union president often agreed to "sweetheart deals" that hurt workers but which added new members and avoided protracted organizing battles. According to at least one account, Raynor was unhappy that the HERE faction had a majority on the board, which permitted Wilhelm and his supporters to veto his proposals. Raynor allegedly began talking about a "divorce" of the two merged unions to precipitate just such an outcome.

In 2007 the union lost its bargaining certificate at Vancouver's General Motors Place. The British Columbia Labour Relations Board conducted a vote to find the employees' preferred affiliation with the Christian Labour Association of Canada.

Significant conflict within the union emerged in early 2009. The union had 366,958 members at the end of 2008. In late 2008, General President Bruce Raynor and 15 local and regional UNITE HERE affiliates in the laundry and garment industries filed lawsuits against Hospitality Division President John Wilhelm, accusing him and his division of fraud, theft, gross mismanagement of $61 million in funds committed to union organizing drives, and failing to resolve members' grievances. Raynor also accused Wilhelm and his allies of attempting to impose their will on the executive board and the majority of members. Wilhelm and several affiliate leaders in the hospitality division sued Raynor and his allies in the laundry and garment division, claiming that Raynor had acted in violation of the union's constitution and procedures in firing large numbers of Wilhelm supporters in Detroit and Phoenix, Arizona. Wilhelm also accused Raynor of disloyalty and dual unionism for continuing to press for the disaffiliation of the garment division affiliates after the UNITE HERE executive board had voted down the proposal.

By March 2009, the conflict had become unresolvable. On March 7, 2009, Raynor and his supporters held a disaffiliation referendum vote among the members in their affiliate unions in advance of UNITE HERE's first quadrennial convention (set for summer 2009), and said that if they were successful, they would affiliate with the Service Employees International Union (SEIU). Wilhelm and his supporters said that the UNITE HERE constitution prevented any such vote without the permission of the international union's executive board. Also at issue was control over Amalgamated Bank, which UNITE brought with it into the merger and whose ownership (and its substantial net worth) now belonged to UNITE HERE. Wilhelm sued Raynor and the 15 affiliates in February 2009 in US district court, but the court declined to prevent the vote.

The period before the vote led to more accusations of misconduct. Wilhelm and his supporters accused SEIU President Andrew Stern of supporting Raynor's disaffiliation move, a charge Stern vigorously denied. Wilhelm also accused Raynor of supporting the disaffiliation effort only because he faced a difficult re-election bid, and of misusing union money and staff to support the secession effort. Raynor categorically denied all charges. Delegates from the 15 affiliates (representing 100,000 members) met in Philadelphia in late March, and on March 22, 2009, they voted to disaffiliate from UNITE HERE and establish a new union, Workers United. Workers United immediately affiliated with SEIU. Former UNITE HERE elected officer Edgar Romney was elected President of Workers United. Despite winning the disaffiliation vote, Raynor announced he would finish his term as General President of UNITE HERE rather than join Workers United—a move, one newspaper said, undertaken so that Workers United could gain control of the Amalgamated Bank.

UNITE HERE and Workers United disagreed over who had jurisdiction over various kinds of workers and how to divide UNITE HERE's assets (most importantly, the bank). Wilhelm asked a federal court to give UNITE HERE control over all the union's assets, but the court declined to issue a ruling at that time. Joseph T. Hansen, president of the United Food and Commercial Workers (UFCW), attempted to mediate a solution in mid-April, proposing (among other things) that UNITE HERE take jurisdiction over workers in the gaming industry and hotels; that Workers United take jurisdiction over workers in textiles and laundries; and that the two unions split organizing in food service. Hansen also suggested that Workers United keep the Amalgamated Bank and the former New York City headquarters of UNITE, but that Workers United make a multimillion-dollar payment to UNITE HERE to compensate it for the losses. Wilhelm rejected the offer. Andrew Stern then suggested that each union retain their existing casino workers, but that UNITE HERE have exclusive jurisdiction over casino workers in the future. Workers United would also pay UNITE HERE $20 million immediately and $46 million move within five years, if UNITE HERE would agree to turn the Amalgamated Bank and other of UNITE's pre-merger assets over to Workers United. United States Senate Majority Leader Harry Reid also unsuccessfully attempted to mediate the dispute. American Federation of Teachers president Randi Weingarten urged the sides to settle as well, writing a letter to both Raynor and Wilhelm cautioning that "This conflict is causing collateral damage. ... The longer it continues, the less likely we are to enact a strong Employee Free Choice Act."

Membership (US records)
View source data.
Finances (US records; ×$1000)
View source data.

Raynor did not finish his term. In April 2009, Wilhelm formally charged Raynor of using union resources to support the disaffiliation movement. Later that month, the UNITE HERE executive board gave Wilhelm the power to suspend Raynor as the union's president, pending an investigation into Wilhelm's charges. Wilhelm suspended Raynor on May 15. Raynor sued Wilhelm and UNITE HERE in federal court, arguing suspension was not permitted under the union's constitution. At 4:00 AM on May 22, UNITE HERE's executive board and John Wilhelm ordered security guards to secure Raynor's New York City office and prevent Raynor and his allies from entering. Wilhelm said he acted to prevent the destruction of documents, and that Raynor's staff had already removed hundreds of documents and scrubbed computer hard drives clean. Wilhelm told the press on May 28 that UNITE HERE staff had found documents showing that Raynor was receiving confidential updates about Workers United activities and finances even though he was still a UNITE HERE official, and that he had shifted millions of dollars of union assets to affiliates seeking disaffiliation. Juan Gonzalez, a columnist for New York Daily News, reported on June 16, 2009, that Raynor had transferred more than $12 million to affiliates which supported him as well as to groups outside the union. The transfers allegedly included:

- A January 31, 2009, transfer of $457,981 to The Organizing Group, a consulting firm founded by Steve Rosenthal (a close associate of former SEIU President Andrew Stern). The Organizing Group, the paper said, used the money to mail and call to UNITE HERE members and advocate for disaffiliation, and to set up a pro-disaffiliation Web site.
- About a dozen transfers totalling $11.2 million between January 26 and 31, 2009, to affiliates which supported Raynor and the disaffiliation movement. The affiliates then allegedly transferred the funds to an external group called Fund for the Future, which supported the disaffiliation effort.
- Another dozen transfers totaling $500,000 on March 6, 2009, were sent to supportive affiliates allegedly to reimburse them for expenditures.

According to internal union documents obtained by the newspaper, Raynor disbursed the money without the required approval from Wilhelm. Wilhelm also accused Raynor of absconding with the $23 million UNITE HERE strike fund (which was invested in the Amalgamated Bank), and investing another $333 million in long-term assets so that the union could not function. Raynor categorically denied the charges. Raynor sued Wilhelm and UNITE HERE, seeking an injunction, access to his office, and return of all property therein. The court declined the request for injunctive relief on May 26. An angry Raynor accused Wilhelm of removing his personal files from the office and resigned on May 30 mere hours before the start of the hearing on his suspension. Wilhelm was named General President of UNITE HERE after Raynor's resignation. He was elected to the position at the union's first quadrennial convention in July 2009.

Wilhelm subsequently accused SEIU of spending millions of dollars to convince more UNITE HERE members to disaffiliate and join Workers United. UNITE HERE retaliated by urging employers not to recognize or negotiate with the locals affiliated with Workers United or honor their dues checkoff agreements. Stern disputed the claim, saying SEIU was merely helping its affiliate regain textile workers still part of UNITE HERE, and that SEIU itself had a legitimate right to organize workers in food service. Stern also said on August 12, 2009, that the efforts had stopped. Nonetheless, UFCW President Joe Hansen continued to try to mediate a resolution, and expressed his hope that a settlement was possible. In July 2009, the presidents of 27 national unions signed a letter sent to Stern in which they announced their support of UNITE HERE and said they would help defend the union against any raid on its membership or incursion into its organizing jurisdiction.

The remaining 265,000 members of UNITE HERE reaffiliated with the AFL–CIO on September 17, 2009.

On July 25, 2010, SEIU and UNITE HERE announced they had resolved their 18-month-long dispute. As part of the agreement, ownership of the Amalgamated Bank will be transferred to Workers United (pending approval of federal banking regulators). UNITE HERE retained ownership of the union's headquarters in New York City and an additional $75 million in assets. The agreement also settles a jurisdictional dispute over which workers the unions will organize. UNITE HERE agreed to restrict its organizing in the food service industry to those workers at airline caterers, airports, businesses, convention centers, and athletic stadiums, while SEIU and Workers United will restrict its organizing activity in the industry to food service workers in state and local government, health care facilities, and prisons. Both unions will continue to organize food service workers in elementary, middle, and secondary schools and in higher education. The two unions had also disagreed over whether several thousand members of Workers United had been given the opportunity to choose which union they wished to belong to. In the new agreement, SEIU and UNITE HERE agreed to let an arbitrator decide to which union the workers wished to belong. At least one analyst characterized the agreement as "SEIU surrendered most of the assets of the venerable splinter union it had tried to absorb, and gave up some jurisdiction it had sought."

=== Hands Off, Pants On ===
In 2016, the union surveyed about 500 hotel workers and found that 58 percent of hotel employees and 77 percent of casino workers said they had been sexually harassed. 49 percent of housekeepers claimed to have been subject to indecent exposure. The survey was supposedly in response to a case where a waitress at Neil Bluhm's Rivers Casino was pulled onto the lap of a guest and asked for oral sex. The Hands Off, Pants On campaign was led by UNITE HERE Local 1 against sexual harassment in the hotel industry in Chicago.

UNITE HERE proposed legislation that would ban hotel guests who have sexually harassed an employee. The union also supported requiring hotels to give "panic buttons" to any employees who work alone in guest rooms. Unionized hotels would be exempt from these rules.

== Strikes ==
=== 2018 Marriott strike ===
UNITE HERE organized a multi-city strike against Marriott Hotels in fall 2018—the largest multi-city hotel workers' strike to date. Citing Marriott's failure to negotiate key issues, 8,300 Marriott workers from across the US voted to authorize a strike in September 2018. Workers in San Francisco and Boston were the first to take action on October 3 and 4, followed by workers in San Diego, Oakland, Hawaii, Detroit and San Jose, affecting 23 hotels overall.

Workers struck for weeks, often in severe weather conditions, for better job security and living wages. While the specific demands varied from property to property, workers rallied around the idea that "One job should be enough," with many citing a need to work two to three jobs in order to make ends meet.

Settlements began to be reached between Marriott and the various UNITE HERE locals in late November. The last contract was ratified in San Francisco on December 3, with 99.6% of the 2,500 local members voting in favor. Across the country, the newly-ratified contracts included significant increases to wages and other benefits, as well as stronger protections against sexual harassment in the workplace.

=== 2021–2025 Vancouver airport hotel strike ===
At the height of the COVID-19 pandemic in 2020, the Public Health Agency of Canada (PHAC) used Vancouver airport's Pacific Gateway Hotel (renamed the Radisson Blu Vancouver Airport Hotel in 2023) as a quarantine site for international travelers. The airport hotel was fully booked during this period, and the PHAC brought in the Red Cross "to perform some of the responsibilities typically performed by hotel workers." As a result of having the extra Red Cross labor, the Pacific Gateway owners laid off 143 employees, or roughly 70 per cent of the hotel staff. But unlike other local hotels that recalled furloughed employees once the pandemic eased, the Pacific Gateway refused to do so. In a show of solidarity, the remaining workers at the hotel—represented by UNITE HERE's Local 40 chapter—walked out on May 3, 2021, demanding their colleagues get their jobs back. This strike at the Vancouver airport hotel would last all the way until March 2025 for a total of 1,411 days, making it by far the longest strike in Canadian history.

In addition to leading the striking workers, Local 40, in coordination with the BC Federation of Labour and Canadian Labour Congress, organized an effective boycott of the hotel. Throughout the three years and ten months of the strike, there were many clashes with the hotel's owners, which had to be adjudicated by the British Columbia Labour Relations Board. Finally, in March 2025, a new collective agreement was negotiated by UNITE HERE Local 40 and ratified by the Radisson Blu Vancouver Airport Hotel workers. The contract included improved pay, benefits, and job security protections, along with a pathway back for the workers laid off during the pandemic.

=== 2023–2024 Los Angeles hotel strike ===
On July 2, 2023, UNITE HERE's Local 11 chapter, which represents 15,000 workers at 61 hotels in the Los Angeles area, initiated a labor strike. The strike utilized the method of rolling strikes at various hotels throughout Southern California. By September 2023, the strike was reported to be the largest hotel strike in the history of Southern California. As of October 2023, the strike was still ongoing, with only four hotels securing a labor agreement by October 25. The strike continued into November 2023 as well. By January 2024, only 28 of the hotels affected by the strike had reached new labor agreements. By February 2024, 34 of the hotels targeted by the strike had reached new contract agreements. By August 2024, 68 hotels had reached new contract agreements. By September 2024, the Unite Here Local 11-led strike in the Los Angeles and Orange Country areas which occurred from 2023 to 2024 would achieve deals for worker in all but three of hotels which were targeted.

=== 2024 nationwide hotel strike ===
On September 1, 2024, more than 10,000 hotel workers at 24 hotels across the United States, ranging from Boston to Hawaii, who were UNITE HERE members began a labor strike. The strike started in nine cities. However, it would at first only remain ongoing in seven cities, with strikes at three hotels in the Seattle-area and the Hilton Baltimore in Baltimore only lasting one day. Over the Labor Day Weekend, a three day strike initiated by UNITE HERE Local 19 would also take place at San Jose's Signia and DoubleTree hotels. On September 22, 2024, it was reported that workers at more hotels in San Jose and San Mateo County were on strike. On October 31, 2024, workers at five hotels in San Jose, including the Signia and Doubletree, who were UNITE HERE members would ratify new labor contracts.

By October 31, hotel workers in Baltimore, San Jose, Sacramento, San Diego, Greenwich and New Haven, Connecticut, Providence, Rhode Island, and Toronto, Canada were able to obtain new contracts. On September 24, 2024, 1,800 of the Hilton Hawaiian Village Waikiki Beach Resort would participate in the strike. It was also reported that 5,000 of the 10,000 workers involved in the nationwide strike which began on September 1, 2024 were based in Hawaii and were members of the UNITE HERE Local 5 chapter. On November 4, 2024, the strike at Hilton Hawaiian Village Waikiki Beach Resort ended after the over 1,800 striking workers ratified a new labor contract. On November 12, 2024, 2,500 additional hotel workers who were UNITE HERE Local 5 members and who worked at the Hawaii-based Marriott-operated hotels Royal Hawaiian, Sheraton Princess Kaiulani, Sheraton Waikiki, Waikiki Beach Marriott Resort, and the Westin Moana Surfrider ratified new labor contracts as well. Workers at Sheraton hotels in Maui would then ratify on new contract on November 13, while workers at Sheraton Kaua'i, who previous held a three day strike over 2024 Labor Day Weekend, would also ratify new labor contracts on November 14. With these ratifications, more than 5,000 UNITE HERE Local 5 members who worked at eight Hawaiian hotels, and who had initially still not settled their labor contract status, would all now have new labor contracts.

On October 6, 2024, UNITE HERE Local 26 members employed at the Hilton Boston Park Plaza and Hilton Boston Logan Airport Hotel in Boston, Massachusetts began an opened-ended strike which involves 24 hours a day, 7 days a week picketing. On October 7, it reported that this strike at the two Boston Hilton hotels, which involves 600 workers, would continue indefinitely, in contrast to some previous labor strikes in the city which only lasted a few days. On October 14, 2024, workers at two additional Boston hotels, Omni Parker House and Omni Boston Seaport, joined the strike as well. Unlike the three day strike which occurred at the two Boston Omni hotels in September 2024, UNITE HERE Local 26 pledged that the strike at all of the four Boston hotels would be indefinite and would not end until Hitlon and Omni and the workers could agree on a new contract. The October 20, 2024, the strike at the two Boston Omni hotels ended after workers unanimously voted to approve new contracts.

By late October, four Hilton properties in Boston now had 765 workers who were on strike. The strike now included employees at Hilton properties DoubleTree Hilton Boston-Cambridge and Hampton Inn & Homewood Suites Boston Seaport. Strike picketing at the four Boston Hilton hotels which had workers on strike ended on October 30, 2024 after workers ratified new contracts.

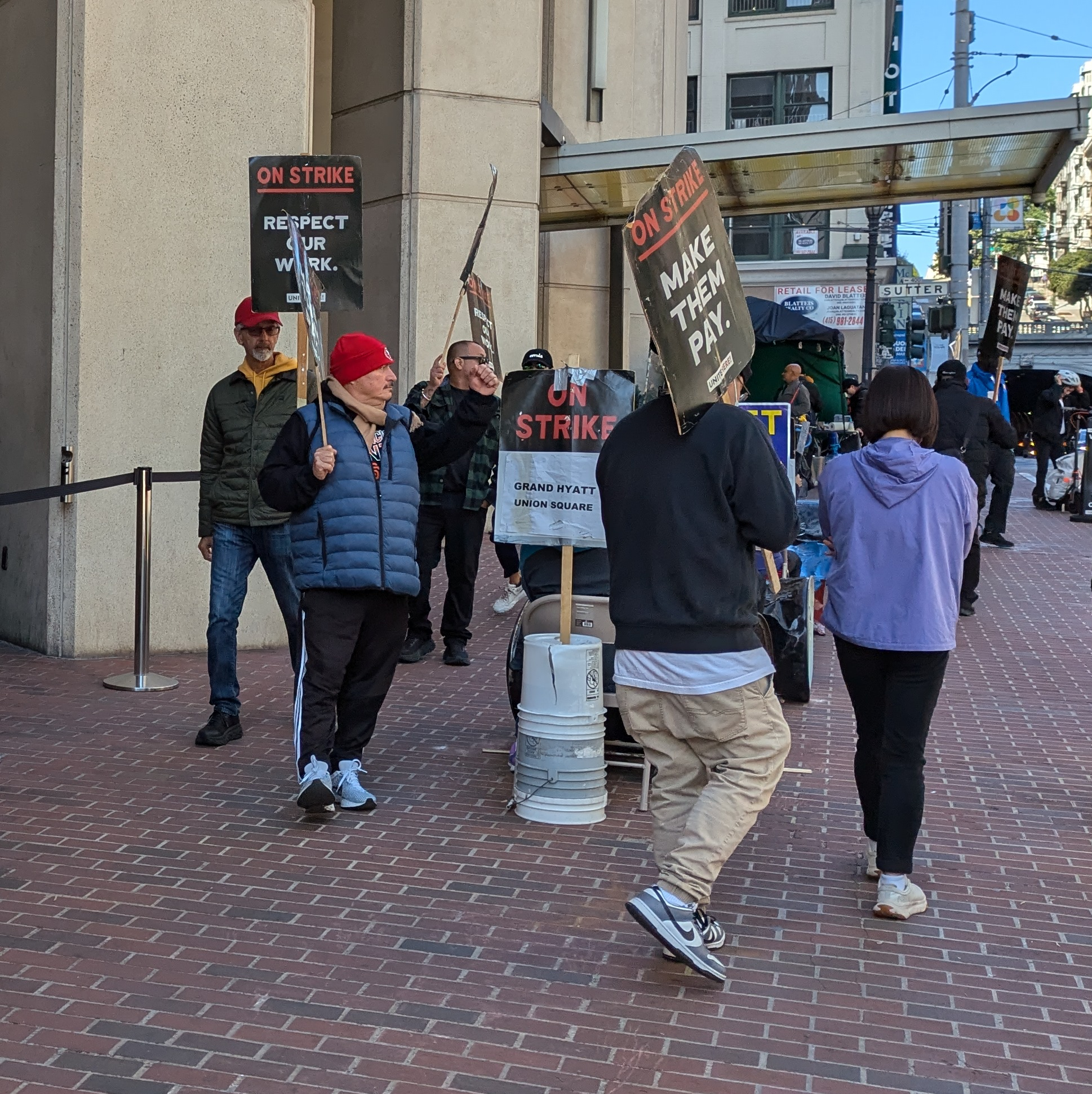
The strike at the Grand Hyatt San Francisco in November 2024

On October 20, 2024, workers at the Palace Hotel in San Francisco who were UNITE HERE members joined other San Francisco hotel workers in going on strike. It has been reported that 2,000 San Francisco hotel workers, including the 300 at the Palace where on strike. Other hotels in San Francisco which had workers who were on strike include Westin St. Francis and the Union Square based Grand Hyatt, Hilton and San Francisco Marriott Union Square hotels, with all of the striking workers at these hotels being members of UNITE HERE's San Francisco-based chapter.

On October 12, 2024, 400 hotel workers at two SeaTac, Washington hotels-DoubleTree by Hilton Hotel Seattle Airport and Seattle Airport Hilton & Conference Center- went on strike. The striking workers were members of the Seattle-based UNITE HERE Local 8 chapter, while both of the hotel were also run by Hilton. The two Seatac-based Hilton hotels were also previously among the three Seattle-area hotels targeted by the one day strike which occurred in September 2024. On November 10, 2024, the strike at the two SeaTac-based hotels concluded when workers ratified a new contract. The new contracts would then be ratified again on November 12.

On November 24, 2024, the number of UNITE HERE members striking at San Francisco-based hotels increased to about 2,500 when about 500 member of UNITE HERE Local 2 went on strike at the San Francisco Marriott Marquis. As of December 2, 2024, the strike at the six San Francisco hotels which began on September 22, 2024 remains ongoing and was also affected 27.5% of San Francisco's hotels. It was also reported that the strike at these hotels was now slated to last through the holidays, with planned Christmas events being cancelled. However, workers at all of the striking hotels in San Francisco would approve contracts would be approved before the month ended, with the Hilton being the last to approve on December 24, 2024, and will last at least four years.

=== 2024 LA Grand Hotel and LAX strike ===
On February 13, 2024 food and beverage workers at Los Angeles International Airport (LAX) who are members of UNITE HERE Local 11 would go on strike for a three day period. This was followed on February 14, 2024 with dozens of employees at Los Angeles Grand Hotel who were also members of UNITE HERE Local 11 also going on strike, demanding better wages and increased staffing.

== Leadership ==
=== Presidents ===
2004: Bruce S. Raynor
2009: John W. Wilhelm
2012: D. Taylor
2024: Gwen Mills

== See also ==
- Culinary Workers Union
- Hotel Workers Rising
- Hotel Employees and Restaurant Employees Union (HERE)
- Union of Needletrades, Industrial and Textile Employees (UNITE)
- Initiative Measure 124 (Seattle)
- Richard Hedreen
- 1922 New England Textile Strike
