= Albert Elsen =

American art historian (1927–1995)

- Born: Albert Edward Elsen, Jr. October 11, 1927; New York City, United States
- Died: February 2, 1995 (aged 67); Stanford, California, United States
- Occupations: Art historian Educator
- Spouses: Patricia Morgan Kline; Sharon McClenahan (m. 1993–1995)
- Children: 3
- Awards: Guggenheim Fellowship (1966)

Academic background
- Education: Columbia University
- Thesis: Rodin's Gates of Hell (1955)
- Doctoral advisor: Meyer Schapiro

Academic work
- Discipline: Art history
- Sub-discipline: Nineteenth- and twentieth-century French art
- Institutions: Carleton College; Indiana University; Stanford University
- Notable students: Kirk Varnedoe

Albert Edward Elsen, Jr. (October 11, 1927 – February 2, 1995) was an American art historian and educator. A scholar of the work of Auguste Rodin, Elsen was the Walter A. Haas Professor in the Humanities at Stanford University.

== Career ==
Born in New York City to Albert Sr. and Julia Louise Huseman, Elsen served as a sergeant major in the United States Army during the World War II European Theater of Operations from 1945 to 1946. He then earned three degrees from Columbia University: a Bachelor of Arts in 1949, a Master of Arts in 1951, and a Doctor of Philosophy in 1955. Elsen wrote a doctoral dissertation on The Gates of Hell of the sculptor Auguste Rodin, under the supervision of Meyer Schapiro. Later, Elsen received an honorary Doctor of Fine Arts from Dickinson College in 1980.

In 1952, Elsen began teaching at Carleton College as Assistant Professor of Art History. Six years later, he moved to Indiana University as Associate Professor, and earned a Guggenheim Fellowship in 1966. Two years after that, Elsen was made Professor of Art History at Stanford University. In 1976, his professorship was endowed as the Walter A. Haas Professor in the Humanities, a post that he held until his death.

Elsen dedicated his career to studying the work of Rodin. In 1985, Elsen worked with the collector B. Gerald Cantor to open the Rodin Sculpture Garden at the Cantor Arts Center. However, Elsen also focused on abstract expressionism by studying the work of such artists as Bruce Beasley, Paul Jenkins, Seymour Lipton, and Henri Matisse.

Elsen organised multiple exhibitions throughout his career, including The Partial Figure in Modern Sculpture: From Rodin to 1969 (Baltimore Museum of Art, 1969), Pioneers of Modern Sculpture (Hayward Gallery, 1973), Rodin's Drawings: True and False (with Kirk Varnedoe; National Gallery of Art and Solomon R. Guggenheim Museum, 1972–73) and Rodin Rediscovered (with Ruth Butler and Kirk Varnedoe; National Gallery of Art, 1981–82).

Elsen died of a heart attack in 1995. Following his death, Stanford installed and dedicated the outdoor sculpture titled Column I by James Rosati to Elsen.

== See also ==
- List of Carleton College people
- List of Columbia University alumni and attendees
- List of Guggenheim Fellowships awarded in 1966
- List of Indiana University (Bloomington) people
- List of people from New York City
- List of Stanford University people
