= Hyatt Regency Seattle =

Hotel in Seattle, Washington

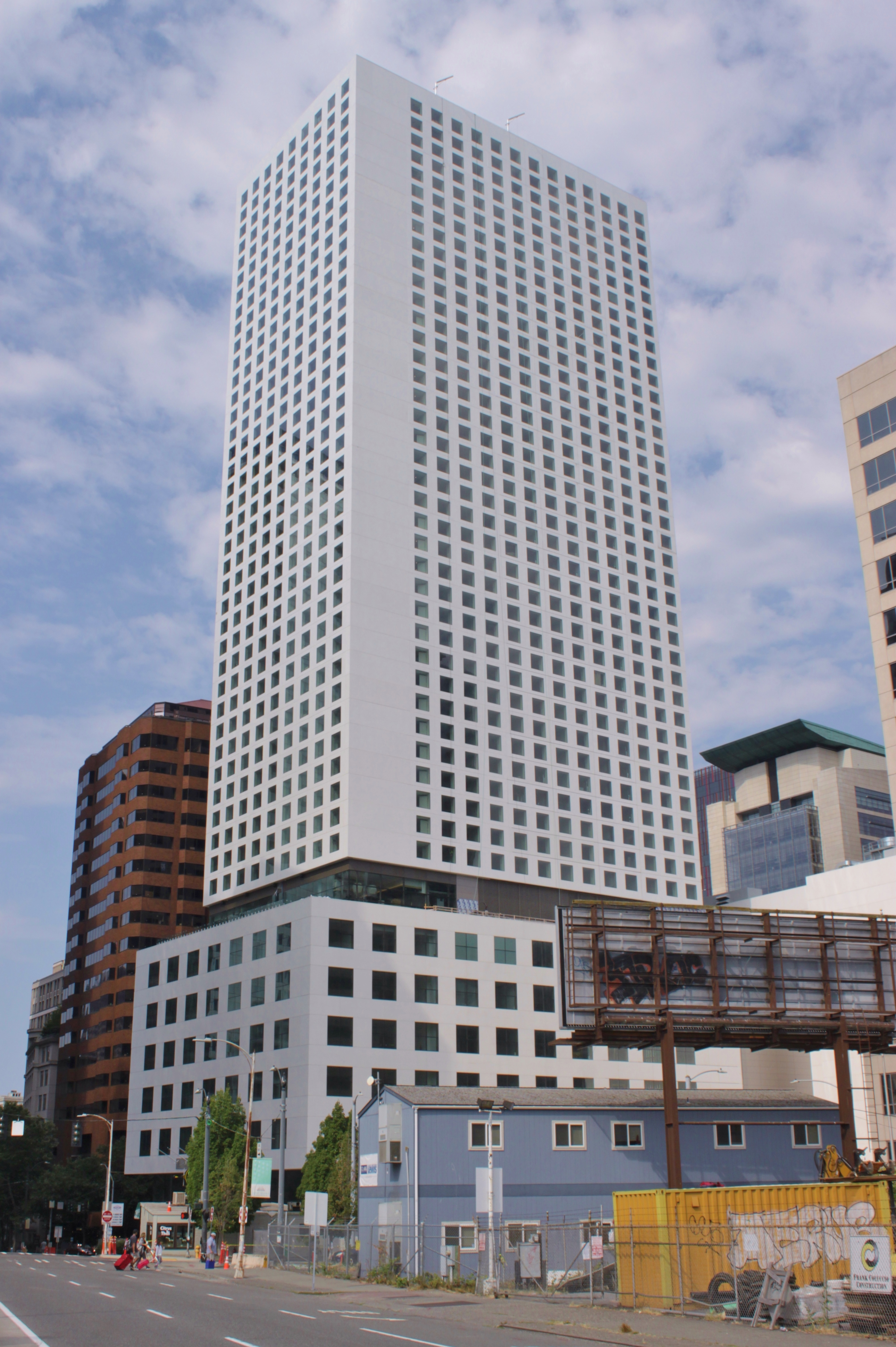
- The hotel's exterior in July 2018

- Location within Seattle WA Downtown
- Alternative names: 8th & Howell Hotel
- Hotel chain: Hyatt Regency

General information
- Status: Completed
- Type: Hotel
- Location: 808 Howell Street; Seattle, Washington; 98101
- Coordinates: 47.6150°N 122.3347°W
- Construction started: 2016
- Opened: December 10, 2018
- Cost: $470 million

Height
- Architectural: 520 feet (160 m)
- Roof: 500 feet (150 m)

Technical details
- Size: 1.2 million square feet (110,000 m^{2})
- Floor count: 45

Design and construction
- Architecture firm: LMN Architects
- Developer: Richard Hedreen
- Services engineer: Arup
- Main contractor: Sellen Construction

Other information
- Number of rooms: 1,260

Hyatt Regency Seattle, also known as 808 Howell Street and 8th & Howell, is a high-rise hotel in the Denny Triangle neighborhood of Seattle, Washington, United States that opened in December 2018. The 45-story hotel, operated by Hyatt, has 1,260 hotel rooms and is the largest in the city. It also has 103,000 square feet (9,600 m^{2}) of meeting and event space, as well as two ballrooms and a lounge.

== History ==
The original proposal for the site was revealed in 2008, but later cancelled due to the Great Recession. That plan called for a 51-story, 500-foot (150 m) hotel that was to be constructed from 2011 to 2013. The hotel would have included 100,000 square feet (9,300 m^{2}) of convention space, meeting rooms, two ballrooms, a restaurant, parking for 1,100 cars, and 1,200 rooms. The site, a three-quarter-block, L-shaped parcel that Richard Hedreen bought in 1995 for $4.5 million, included a Greyhound Lines bus station that would have been demolished for the hotel.

After cancelling the earlier hotel project, R.C. Hedreen purchased the remaining land on the block in 2012. The developer has discussed putting a hotel and possibly an office building on the site. The developer then had a plan to build two 500-foot (150 m) towers with a hotel, apartments, and office space. The plan was altered in March 2013, most notably to remove the offices and second tower, to simplify the approval process. The 43 story building features a 1,550 room hotel (which would be the largest in Seattle), 150,000 square feet (14,000 m^{2}) of meeting space, 150 apartments, and 45,000 square feet (4,200 m^{2}) of retail space.

This project was further modified because an arrangement could not be reached with the City of Seattle to vacate the alley in exchange for the inclusion of 152 affordable housing units, using only three quarters of the block. The remaining quarter will be developed into a smaller, 450-room hotel. The project was at the center of a dispute between developer Hedreen and a local labor union, who alleged that the building would not provide adequate public benefits as required by the city's land use code; ultimately, an appeal to the city was rejected and allowed construction of the project to begin in 2016.

Greyhound relocated the bus terminal in 2014 to a location near the Stadium light rail station in the SoDo neighborhood. Demolition of the terminal building began in September 2015. The 45-story hotel opened on December 10, 2018, and is operated under the Hyatt Regency brand. It cost $470 million to construct and fully opened on December 17, 2018. The hotel has conferences booked into 2026, including a meeting of the American Library Association in January 2019 that was the venue's first major event.

== Facilities ==
The 45-story hotel has 1,264 rooms, making it the largest hotel in the Pacific Northwest. It has 103,000 square feet (9,600 m^{2}) of conference and meeting space, including 46 meeting rooms and two ballrooms. The lower floors of the building have two restaurants and a "grab and go" store. The Hyatt Regency has a staff of more than 400 workers.

== See also ==
- List of tallest buildings in Seattle
