= Union of Needletrades, Industrial & Textile Employees =

Former trade union of the United States

UNITE!
- Union of Needletrades, Industrial and Textile Employees
- Union merger: International Ladies Garment Workers Union, Amalgamated Clothing and Textile Workers Union
- Successor: UNITE HERE
- Founded: 1995
- Dissolved: 2004
- Headquarters: New York City
- Location: Canada, United States
- Key people: Jay Mazur, Bruce Raynor
- Affiliations: CLC, AFL–CIO
- Website: https://web.archive.org/web/20020607204057/http://www.uniteunion.org/index.htm

The Union of Needletrades, Industrial, and Textile Employees (UNITE, often stylized UNITE!) was a labor union in the United States clothing industry from 1995–2004.

== History ==
=== UNITE-ILGWU/ACTWU Merger ===
UNITE was formed in 1995 as a merger between the International Ladies' Garment Workers' Union (ILGWU) and the Amalgamated Clothing and Textile Workers Union (ACTWU).

UNITE's core industries were textile and apparel manufacturing, distribution, and retailing, but they also had locals involved in industrial laundry, and manufacturing in other industries.

Jay Mazur served as president of UNITE from its inception until his retirement in 2001. Bruce Raynor was later elected president, where he served until the HERE merger.

=== UNITE HERE Merger ===
In 2004, UNITE announced that it would merge with the Hotel Employees and Restaurant Employees Union (HERE) to form UNITE HERE. In 2009 most of the apparel and laundry workers in UNITE HERE broke away to form a separate union known as Workers United, which affiliated with the Service Employees International Union.

== See also ==
- 1922 New England Textile Strike
