= Edward T. Hanley =

Edward T. Hanley (January 21, 1932 – January 7, 2000) was a labor activist and president of the Hotel Employees and Restaurant Employees International Union (HERE).

== Early life and union career ==
Edward Thomas 'Ed' Hanley was born in Chicago, Illinois in 1932, the son of James and Doris Hanley. His father was a tavern owner. Hanley graduated from St. Phillip's High School in Chicago in 1949 and served in the United States Air Force in the Korean War.

In 1959, Hanley tended bar at his father's tavern. In 1964, Hanley was elected president of the Chicago Bartenders and Beverage Dispensers Union. He quickly rose in the union's ranks.

At the age of 41, Hanley was elected president of HERE in 1973. He succeeded Ed Miller. That same year, he married Kathryn Dekker. Over the next few years, they had two sons, Edward Jr. and Thomas.

Hanley was elected to the AFL-CIO executive council in 1975, and played a key role in bringing the International Brotherhood of Teamsters back into the AFL-CIO.

== Alleged ties to organized crime ==
Hanley was often criticized for his union's close ties to organized crime. In 1977, the United States Department of Justice (DOJ) said HERE was a classic example of organized crime's control over a major labor union. DOJ also alleged that Hanley's election as president of the union was assisted by Chicago crime boss Joey Aiuppa. Hanley denied the accusation.

HERE was investigated for ties to organized crime again in 1984. Testifying before a United States Senate, Hanley asserted his Fifth Amendment right against self-incrimination 36 times.

In 1985, the President's Commission on Organized Crime claimed that HERE was one of the four most corrupt unions in the United States. Hanley denounced the allegation.

HERE was a union in decline when Hanley took over. Over the next two decades, union membership fell to 230,000 from 400,000. But Hanley could be a vigorous organizer when it suited him, and union membership recovered by 20,000 in the 1990s. In the late 1980s, Hanley hired John Wilhelm, an organizer and future president of the international union.

Hanley also sought to merge a number of HERE's affiliates into multi-employer locals to match the changes occurring in the hotel and restaurant industries as they came to be dominated by large, corporate-owned chains.

Hanley built strong political connections to assist his union in organizing and collective bargaining. Among the many notable individuals who Hanley counted among his friends were House Ways and Means Committee chairman Dan Rostenkowski, the Rev. Jesse Jackson, Chicago mayor Richard M. Daley, and former Illinois governor James R. Thompson.

Critics, however, argued that Hanley engaged in organizing new members only in order to maintain his own high salary. They pointed to Hanley's lavish way of life, the union-owned $2.5 million jet maintained solely for his use, and the union office near his vacation home in Palm Springs, California.

In 1995, Hanley was one of 11 AFL-CIO vice president instrumental in obtaining the resignation of AFL-CIO president Lane Kirkland and recruiting and electing John Sweeney to the top position in the labor body.

== Retirement and death ==
DOJ once more investigated HERE for racketeering and corruption in 1995. This time, however, HERE was forced to agree to a court-appointed monitor. The monitor accused Hanley of a wide range of abuses ranging from misuse of the union jet to collecting $31,000 in salary for performing a nonexistent job for HERE Local 1. The monitor also found that Hanley had set up a fake union local near his Wisconsin vacation home. The 'president' of the fake local then performed jobs for Hanley.

Hanley said he had done nothing wrong, but negotiated an out-of-court settlement that guaranteed him immunity from prosecution. In the second year of a five-year terms, Ed Hanley retired on July 31, 1998. He remained chairman of the board of trustees of the HERE Welfare/Pension Funds until 1999.

Also removed from the union was Thomas Hanley, Ed Hanley's son, who was HERE's director of organization as well as president of HERE Local 1 in Chicago.

Hanley retired to his home in Wadsworth, Illinois, but also spent time at a vacation home near Land O' Lakes, Wisconsin. On Friday, January 7, 2000, while he was driving on a country highway in Land O' Lakes, Hanley was killed when his vehicle collided with another vehicle head-on. The other driver, Roy R. Stopczynski of Land O' Lakes, was later convicted by a jury of a felony charge of homicide by use of a vehicle while having a prohibited blood-alcohol content.

Hanley was survived by his wife, two sons, two sisters and four grandchildren.

== Sources ==
- Bologna, Michael. "Wilhelm Elected President of HERE Following Retirements of Hanley, O'Gara." Daily Labor Report. May 20, 1998.
- Greenhouse, Steven. "Edward Hanley, 67, Longtime Union Leader." New York Times. January 16, 2000. p. A36.
- "Legendary Union Leader Edward Hanley Dies in Automobile Accident in Wisconsin." Labor Relations Week. January 13, 2000. p. 36.

Trade union offices
Preceded by Ed Miller	President of the Hotel Employees and Restaurant Employees Union; 1973–1998	Succeeded by John W. Wilhelm
