= Initiative Measure 124 (Seattle) =

Ballot measure in Seattle

Initiative Measure 124 was a ballot measure in Seattle, Washington, regulating labor relations in the hotel industry, that was passed by popular vote on November 8, 2016. The initiative was placed on the ballot by UNITE HERE Local 8, a union that represents workers in the hospitality industry. Supporters of the measure see it as bringing a measure of justice to exploited workers. Opponents say the new law is unfair to guests, too expensive to implement, and unfairly advantages unions.

In 2019, the Seattle City Council repealed the original initiative, and replaced it with four separate laws, re-written and modified with the intent to survive the pending and anticipated lawsuits concerning a single subject for the initiative, and changing the employer healthcare mandate to avoid interfering with federal laws concerning employee benefits, which pre-empt state or local laws.

== Legislative history ==
Initiative Measure 124 was sponsored by UNITE HERE Local 8. Stefan Moritz, a union official, filed the initial text of the initiative with Seattle's city clerk on April 5, 2016. The union began collecting signatures to get the measure on the November ballot in May 2016. The final text of the initiative was filed on May 6. The union submitted its petition signatures on June 22 and King County Elections issued a Letter of Sufficiency on July 15. The final text of the ballot title was issued on July 28. The measure passed on November 8, 2016 and became a city ordinance with full effect on November 30 after a proclamation by Mayor Ed Murray.

== Provisions ==
The initiative requires hotels with 60 or more rooms to issue "panic buttons" to employees that work alone in guest rooms. Hotels are required to keep lists of guests accused of assault or harassment for five years from the date of the last accusation involving any given guest. All relevant documents must be retained for the same period. Any guest accused of assault, sexual assault, or sexual harassment must be banned from the hotel for a minimum of three years. A mere accusation is sufficient to require a ban. No investigation is required. There is no provision for appeals. Workers must be given paid time to make a police report and be given the option to work in a different area of the hotel. Police may only be contacted with the permission of the worker. Hotels are required to warn guests about these rules with a placard written in a large font placed on the interior side of their room doors.

Under the initiative, when a hotel is sold the new owners are required to offer employees of the previous owner work before hiring replacement staff. This requirement applies from the day of sale until six months after the hotel is open to the public while under the management of the new employer. If during the first 90 days of operations the new owner finds that it needs fewer workers, staff must be retained by order of seniority. During this 90 day period staff may not be otherwise dismissed except for cause. Workers must be provided with a written performance evaluation at the end of this period; these records must be retained for at least three years. Conspicuous public notice of change of ownership, including contact information for the new owners, must be posted within five days after a sale is agreed to and must remain posted for six months after the hotel has been open to the public under new management. This provision applies to hotels with 60 rooms or more.

The initiative requires large hotels to limit the workload of cleaning staff to 5,000 square feet per eight-hour shift and regulates the handling of cleaning chemicals. Cleaners assigned space over this limit would be paid at time-and-a-half wage. This provision applies to hotels with 100 rooms or more.

The initiative requires large hotels that don't offer health benefits to pay staff a monthly stipend to help them buy insurance. Qualifying workers would receive an amount based on their income, family size, the federal poverty line, and the lowest premium offered on the Washington Health Benefits Exchange for a gold-level policy. This provision applies to hotels with 100 or more rooms.

Workers can enforce these rights by filing a complaint with the City of Seattle or filing suit in King County Superior Court. Penalties issued against hotels go to the complainant, affected workers, and the city Office of Civil Rights. The measure prohibits employer retaliation for exercising any of these rights. The law has a rebuttable presumption that any adverse action taken against an employee within 90 days of exercising any of these rights is an act of illegal retaliation.

=== Union-shop exemption ===
Except for the provisions relating to assault, sexual assault, and sexual harassment, every part of this measure can be waived in a union-shop through collective bargaining.

== Debate ==
=== Opposition ===
The Seattle Times editorial board opposed the initiative. They wrote, "If the safety of Seattle hotel employees is a problem, the laws that protect them should be strengthened. Seattle ballot Initiative 124 is a sloppy, possibly illegal first draft that should be rejected by voters."

=== Support ===
Seattle Weekly endorsed the initiative. They wrote, "Critics of the initiative—largely hotel-industry representatives—call the measure's stipulations overreaching and Draconian. They say many hotels already have these kinds of protections in place. They also point to I-124's union-exemption clause: If workers belong to a union, their hotel will not be subject to some of the measure's stipulations, to allow for freer collective bargaining. We ourselves recognize that the union exemption may be faintly disguised self-interest; employers might find the law onerous, leading them to encourage unionization in hopes of a better deal. But if the byproduct of passing I-124 is a stronger local union, so be it. We believe the result is a step toward justice for a long-exploited class of workers, union-backed or no."

== Litigation ==
The American Hotel & Lodging Association, its Washington state chapter, and its Seattle chapter all filed suit in Washington state court to block Initiative Measure 124 in December 2016.

On December 24, 2018, a Washington State Court of Appeals threw out I-124 in its entirety, holding that it unconstitutionally contains multiple unrelated topics.

After a King County Superior Court ruled in favor of the initiative, the state Supreme Court last January declined to hear a direct appeal and sent it to the Court of Appeals for further review.

The Appeals Court found that I-124 contains multiple separate parts, including:

- protecting workers who must enter guests’ hotel rooms from sexual harassment and assault by providing panic buttons and requiring hotels to maintain a list of guests who have been accused of sexual assault or harassment;
- requiring hotel employers to provide and use safety devices and safeguards, and prohibiting large hotels from requiring hotel workers to clean more than 5000 square feet per 8-hour day without time-and-a-half pay;
- requiring large hotel employers to provide healthcare subsidies to hotel workers or the equivalent of a gold-level healthcare policy;
- when a hotel changes ownership, requiring the new owner to hire from the list of employees prior to the sale for the first six months.

The statement for and against Initiative 124 is here.

== See also ==
- Hands Off, Pants On
