= Tom Hanley =

American labor organizer, union leader and mobster (1916-1979)

Thomas Hanley (1916 – November 24, 1979) was an American labor organizer, union leader, and mobster based in Las Vegas, Nevada. He served as the head of the American Federation of Casino and Gaming Employees and the Gaming and Office Employee Union, with his career marked by criminal allegations and a conviction for the 1977 murder of labor leader Al Bramlet.

== Career ==
Hanley worked as a union leader in Las Vegas, and led the American Federation of Casino and Gaming Employees and the Gaming and Office Employee Union. His career was marked by allegations of criminal activity, including ties to organized crime. Hanley was associated with the Binion family and the Midwest mob.

In 1966, Hanley was accused of killing Ralph Alsup, a member of the Plumbers and Pipefitters Local 525, but the charges were dropped. In 1968, he was arrested for a separate murder but maintained that the charges were part of a campaign of harassment against him. These charges were also dismissed.

In 1977, Hanley and his son, Andrew Gramby Hanley, were charged with the kidnapping and murder of Al Bramlet, a labor leader and president of Nevada's AFL-CIO. Bramlet’s body was found in a shallow grave, and an autopsy revealed he died of multiple gunshot wounds. Hanley later pled guilty to the crime.

Hanley testified as a government witness in a racketeering trial two weeks before his death.

== Personal life ==
Hanley was born in 1916. He died on November 24, 1979 at the age of 63 while under guard at Valley Hospital in Las Vegas. He had been suffering from chronic hepatitis and reported experiencing seizures that caused brain damage. An autopsy was conducted, and no evidence suggested anything other than natural causes.
