= Culinary Workers Union =

Local union in Nevada, U.S.

- Culinary Workers Union, UNITE HERE Local 226
- Founded: November 1, 1935; 90 years ago
- Headquarters: 5241 Spring Mountain Rd. Las Vegas, Nevada
- Location: United States
- Members: 60,000
- President: Diana Valles
- Key people: Ted Pappageorge (Secretary-Treasurer)
- Parent organization: UNITE HERE
- Affiliations: Nevada AFL–CIO
- Website: culinaryunion226.org

The Culinary Workers Union, UNITE HERE Local 226 is a local union affiliated with UNITE HERE which operates in the Las Vegas metropolitan area of Nevada. Members include a variety of occupations organized along craft lines working in restaurants, hotels and laundries, in the casinos in the Las Vegas metropolitan area and Reno, as well as Harry Reid International Airport and Valley Hospital Medical Center. While most Culinary members work in casinos, the union does not represent dealers and other employees directly providing gaming services.

With 60,000 members, the Culinary is the largest union in the state of Nevada. The union tripled its membership between 1990 and 2020, even as labor union membership declined nationwide in the same time period. According to labor journalist Steven Greenhouse, it has "catapulted thousands of dishwashers, waiters, and hotel housekeepers into the middle class, even though those are poverty-level jobs in many other cities." Despite Nevada's status as a "right-to-work" state, around 97% of bargaining units choose to join the Culinary Union and pay dues. This has led The New Republic to call the Culinary Union "America's greatest modern labor success story."

On September 27, 2023, the union's Las Vegas chapter voted to authorize a strike. A tentative deal was then reached on November 8, 9 and 10, 2023 to prevent a strike. The new five-year contract would then be ratified with 99% approval when voting concluded for Caesar's Entertainment, MGM Resorts and Wynn Resorts workers on November 20, 21 and 22. On January 26, 2024, the Culinary Union also reached tentative agreements on a five-year labor contract with Circus Circus Hotel & Casino Las Vegas and a three-year labor contract with Circus Circus Reno. The strikes ended with workers gaining pay increases of 32% over five years, with the average worker's pay increasing from $26-28 per hour to $35-37 per hour (including benefits).

On September 19, 2024, the Venetian, which was built in 1999 and was the last remaining Las Vegas Strip casino to not have a union, would become the latest Las Vegas Strip resort to approve a Culinary Union labor contract.

== History ==
=== COVID-19 ===
As a result of the COVID-19 pandemic and its negative impacts on the Nevada tourist industry, more than 98% of the union's members became unemployed in 2020. During the pandemic, the union provided 18 months of free health insurance to laid-off members and distributed over 475,000 baskets of food to hospitality workers' families in need. It also lobbied for Nevada's Senate Bill 4, which instituted COVID-19 workplace safety regulations for the state's hospitality industry, and Senate Bill 386, which guaranteed laid-off hospitality workers the right to be rehired into their old jobs when casinos and other businesses reopened.

=== November 2024 Virgin Hotels Las Vegas strike ===
The Virgin Hotels Las Vegas was a key target for the Culinary Workers Union, as by September 2024, Culinary Union members at the Las Vegas Virgin Hotel & Casino were still without a labor contract since the previous one expired in June 2023. A limited, two day strike at the hotel was held from May 10–11, 2024; later that year, on November 15, 2024, 700 workers at the Virgin Hotels Las Vegas went on an indefinite, open-ended strike. This became the Culinary Worker's Union's first open-ended strike in Las Vegas since 2002. Unlike the May labor strike, the November 2024 Virgin Hotels Las Vegas strike would remain in effect until a new labor deal could be reached. However, despite workers picketing around the hotel, Virgin Hotels Las Vegas remained operational with the hotel successfully hiring temporary workers. The Virgin Hotel Las Vegas also opened for people attending the 2024 Las Vegas Grand Prix.

Starting November 21, 2024, the strike at the Virgin Hotel Las Vegas saw civil disobedience. On the first day of civil disobedience at the hotel, 57 people were arrested for intentionally blocking a road, including union President Diana Valles and Secretary-Treasurer Ted Pappageorge. On December 3, 2024, management at the hotel reported that Virgin Hotels Las Vegas was in financial distress, criticizing the Culinary Union's demands. Management also reported that in spite of the ongoing strike, 60% of Culinary Union members employed by the Virgin Hotels Las Vegas were already working at the hotel again. All 700 striking workers at Virgin Hotels Las Vegas held a public meeting with the Las Vegas-based Nevada Gaming Control Board on December 4, 2024.

The strike ended after 69 days, with a contract ratified in January 2025; workers approved a new five-year contract that included a pay increase of 32% over five years, with the average worker's pay increasing from $28 per hour to $37 per hour (including benefits).

== Politics ==
The union is an influential supporter of Democratic politicians and causes in the state of Nevada. Jon Ralston has credited its voter education and turnout operations for Democrats' statewide, state legislative, and congressional victories in 2016, 2018, and 2020, and for maintaining many of these gains in 2022. According to The Nevada Independent, the union is "among the most singularly powerful political forces in Nevada" and is a "key cog in the [Reid] machine." However, the union has endorsed Republicans, notably Lori Rogich.

In January 2008, the union endorsed Illinois Senator Barack Obama over New York Senator Hillary Clinton during the 2008 Democratic caucuses.

In February 2016, the union declined to endorse either Clinton or Vermont Senator Bernie Sanders during the caucuses, and later endorsed Clinton when she became the Democratic presidential nominee. She lost the general election to Donald Trump on November 8, 2016, though she won Nevada.

Yvanna Cancela, the political director for the union, was appointed to the Nevada Senate in 2017, and later became chief of staff to Nevada governor Steve Sisolak.

In December 2018, Bea Duran, a grievance representative for the Culinary Workers, was appointed to the Nevada State Assembly.

In February 2020, the Union once again declined to endorse a candidate for that year's caucuses. Their decision came after it circulated a flyer among members criticizing Sanders and Massachusetts Senator Elizabeth Warren's support for single-payer healthcare, which it argued would leave members with worse benefits. Some union leaders reported receiving threats after the flyer was published. Despite this warning, a majority of the union's members caucusing at one casino in Nevada voted for Sanders.

In January 2024, Vice President Kamala Harris visited Las Vegas to meet with members of the culinary union in what was billed as a "celebration" following the negotiation of the five-year contract with casino employers in the city. Harris thanked workers for "making a difference in the lives of people who you may never meet". She was joined by Labor Secretary Julie Su, alongside a host of Nevada politicians who also spoke at the event. Many union members attended and wore bright red T-shirts, hats, and sweatshirts bearing the messages “Vegas Strong” and “One Job Should Be Enough.”

== Leadership ==
=== Secretary-Treasurers ===
1954: Al Bramlet
1977: Ben Schmoutey
1981: Jeff McColl
1987: Jim Arnold
2002: D. Taylor
2012: Geoconda Argüello-Kline
2022: Ted Pappageorge
