= James Rosati =

American artist (1911–1988)

Untitled (Three Forms), stainless steel sculpture by James Rosati, 1975-1976, Honolulu Museum of Art

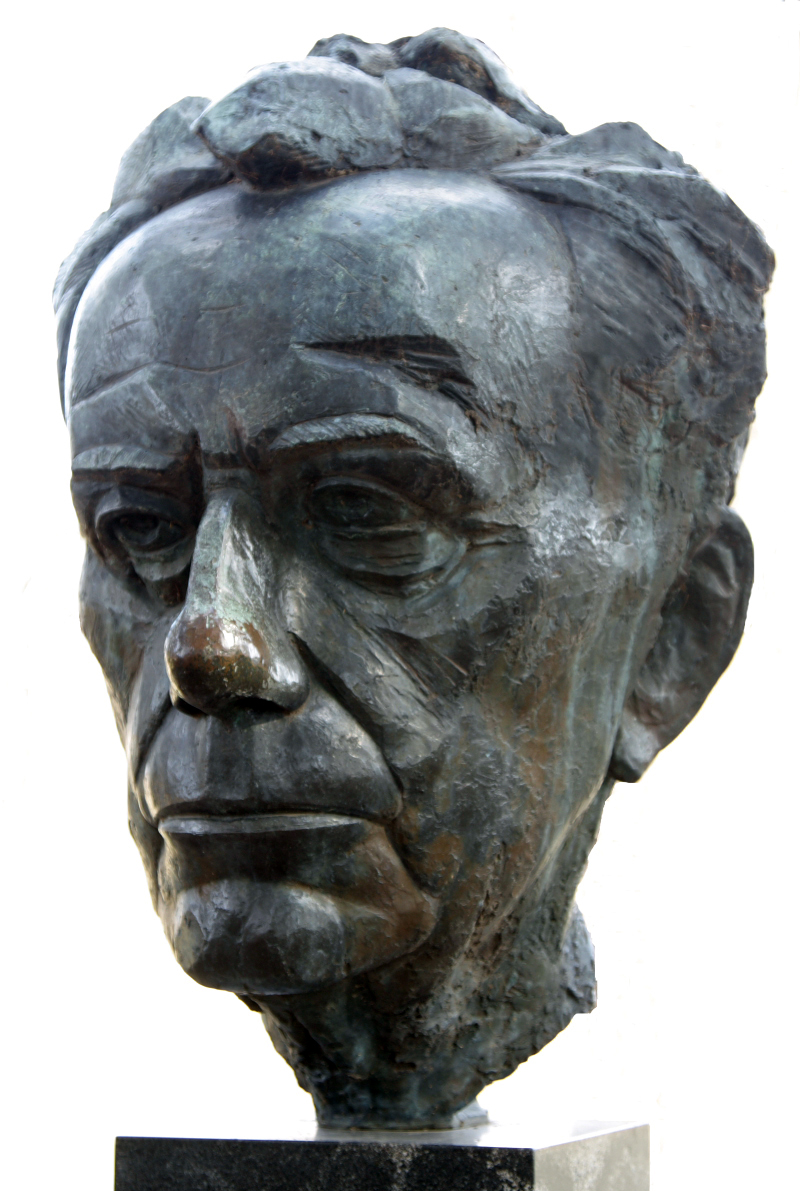
Bust of Paul Tillich by James Rosati in New Harmony, Indiana, U.S.

James Rosati (1911 in Washington, Pennsylvania 1911 – 1988 in New York City) was an American abstract sculptor. He is best known for creating an outdoor sculpture in New York: a stainless steel Ideogram that was located in the World Trade Center Plaza.

== Life ==
Born near Pittsburgh, Rosati moved to New York in 1944, where he befriended fellow sculptor Phillip Pavia. He was a charter member of the Eighth Street Club (the Club) and the New York School of abstract expressionists. Rosati was among the participants in the 9th Street Art Exhibition and the subsequent Stable Gallery shows. He met and became friends with painters Willem de Kooning and Franz Kline, and sculptor David Smith. He was awarded the Mr and Mrs Frank G. Logan Art Institute Prize for sculpture in 1962 and a John Simon Guggenheim Fellowship in 1964. A 1969 show at Brandeis University lifted his career to new heights. He had other solo exhibitions and was in numerous group shows.

Rosati is perhaps best known for his sculptures in stone from the 1960s, and the 1972 stainless steel Ideogram. that stood over 23-foot (7.0 m) tall on the plaza between Towers 1 and 2 of the World Trade Center in New York City. Rosati created many monumental pieces of sculpture which are located in the United States and around the world.

== Public collections ==
Public collections holding work by James Rosati include:

- Albright-Knox Art Gallery (Buffalo, New York)
- Carnegie Museum of Art (Pittsburgh, Pennsylvania)
- Governor Nelson A. Rockefeller Empire State Plaza Art Collection (Albany, New York)
- Grounds for Sculpture (Hamilton, New Jersey)
- Honolulu Museum of Art (Honolulu, Hawaii)
- Museo della Scultural Contemporanea - Matera (Matera, Italy)
- National Gallery of Art (Washington, D. C.)
- Whitney Museum of American Art (New York City)
- Yale University Art Gallery (New Haven, Connecticut)

== Selected works ==
- Column I, Stanford University
- Loo Wit, Seattle University
- Upright Form V, 1982, Montgomery Museum of Fine Arts, Blount Cultural Park, Montgomery, Alabama

== Sources ==
- Marika Herskovic, American Abstract and Figurative Expressionism: Style Is Timely Art Is Timeless (New York School Press, 2009.) ISBN 978-0-9677994-2-1. p. 204-207
- Marika Herskovic, New York School Abstract Expressionists Artists Choice by Artists, (New York School Press, 2000.) ISBN 0-9677994-0-6. p. 16; p. 25; p. 38; p. 314-317
