= Hotel Employees and Restaurant Employees Union =

Former trade union of the United States

HERE
- Hotel Employees and Restaurant Employees and Bartenders International Union
- Merged into: (UNITE!)
- Successor: UNITE HERE
- Founded: 1891
- Dissolved: 2004
- Headquarters: Washington, DC
- Location: Canada, United States
- Key people: Edward T. Hanley, John W. Wilhelm
- Affiliations: CLC, AFL–CIO

The Hotel Employees and Restaurant Employees and Bartenders International Union (HERE) was an international trade union representing culinary and hospitality workers in the United States and Canada. It was formed in April 1891. In 2004, HERE merged with the Union of Needletrades, Industrial, and Textile Employees (UNITE) to form UNITE HERE. HERE notably organized the staff of Yale University in 1984. Other major employers that contracted with this union included Harrah's, Caesars Palace, Wynn Resorts, Hilton Hotels, Hyatt, and Walt Disney World. HERE was affiliated with the AFL–CIO and the Canadian Labour Congress.

== History ==
HERE was formed as the "Waiters and Bartenders National Union" in 1891 as an AFL (American Federation of Labor) affiliated union. The early years of the union were marked by fights between factions headed by Vice-President W.C Pomeroy and Jere Sullivan, the latter of whom was the Treasurer and Editor of the Union's monthly. However, by 1899, Sullivan emerged as the leader of the union and solidified his control by ousting the then-president Robert A Callahan in 1905. In the years following Sullivan's rise to power, the union steadily gained membership and grew.

In 1918, the union experienced its highest membership (65,938 members). However, Prohibition, which unemployed a larger section of its membership who worked in bars, and the First Red Scare took a heavy toll on the organization, which diminished to 37,743 members in 1923. The union struggled to survive the grave lose, but managed to recover soon after Prohibition was overturned in 1933. At the same time, the Great Depression forced HERE to contend with more militant alternatives, mainly the Food Workers United, leading HERE to undergo a "rebirth" as an industrial union. However, despite the advances of HERE suffered from association with organized crime. In the years following the Depression and World War II HERE continued to grow and remained an industrial union. In 1947, after a contentious election, Hugo Ernst emerged as the definitive leader of the organization (Sullivan having died in 1928). HERE largely embraced the New Deal policies of the time and began making advancements in the use of education and research by the union to improve their efforts.

HERE later merged with UNITE (Union of Needletrades, Industrial and Textile Employees)in 2004 to form UNITE-HERE.

== Female participation and leadership ==
Female membership in HERE grew from 2,000 in 1908 to 181,000 in 1950. The rise in women membership reflected the feminization of the hotel and restaurant industry and the increase in the performance of waiting work by women. Women's presence in leadership positions of HERE also increased. Waitress activists sat on the General Executive Board (GEB) from 1909 on and participated in various conventions, though as a minority status. Participation was highest in the 1920s. Though female participation in HERE dipped in the 1930s and 1940s, it was still disproportionately higher than in other unions.

Women also enjoyed leadership positions at the local level. A national estimation written in 1926 held that 43 culinary locals had female secretaries; in 1944 California, 21 out of 75 locals had female secretaries, a prominent position in labor organizing. Women were able to enjoy such success in HERE due to the separation of workers by trade, which provided waitress activists "space apart from male hostility and … the development of female perspectives and leadership skills." Gertrude Lane was an organizer within a local union of the Hotel and Restaurant Employees and Bartenders International Union.

== Archives ==
The Kheel Center for Labor-Management Documentation and Archives, Martin P. Catherwood Library at Cornell University holds numerous collections of archival material generated by HERE at a national level.

The Walter P. Reuther Library at Wayne State University in Detroit, Michigan houses an archival collection detailing the history of HERE Local 24 from 1914 to 1976, including numerous photographs.

The UCLA Library Department of Special Collections holds the records of UNITE HERE Local 11, which includes records of HERE locals in Los Angeles, Santa Monica, and Long Beach, California.

== Presidents ==
1893: John E. Mee
1899: Joseph R. Michaels
1902: Robert A. Callahan
1904: T. J. Sullivan
1911: Edward Flore
1945: Hugo Ernst
1954: Ed Miller
1973: Edward T. Hanley
1998: John W. Wilhelm
