= Civic Square =

Civic Square may refer to:

- Civic Square, Canberra, Australia
- Civic Square, Wellington, New Zealand
- Seattle Civic Square, United States
- Civic Square (Hong Kong), on Tim Mei Avenue
