= Pioneer Square station (Sound Transit) =

Light rail station in Seattle, Washington, U.S.

52 Pioneer Square
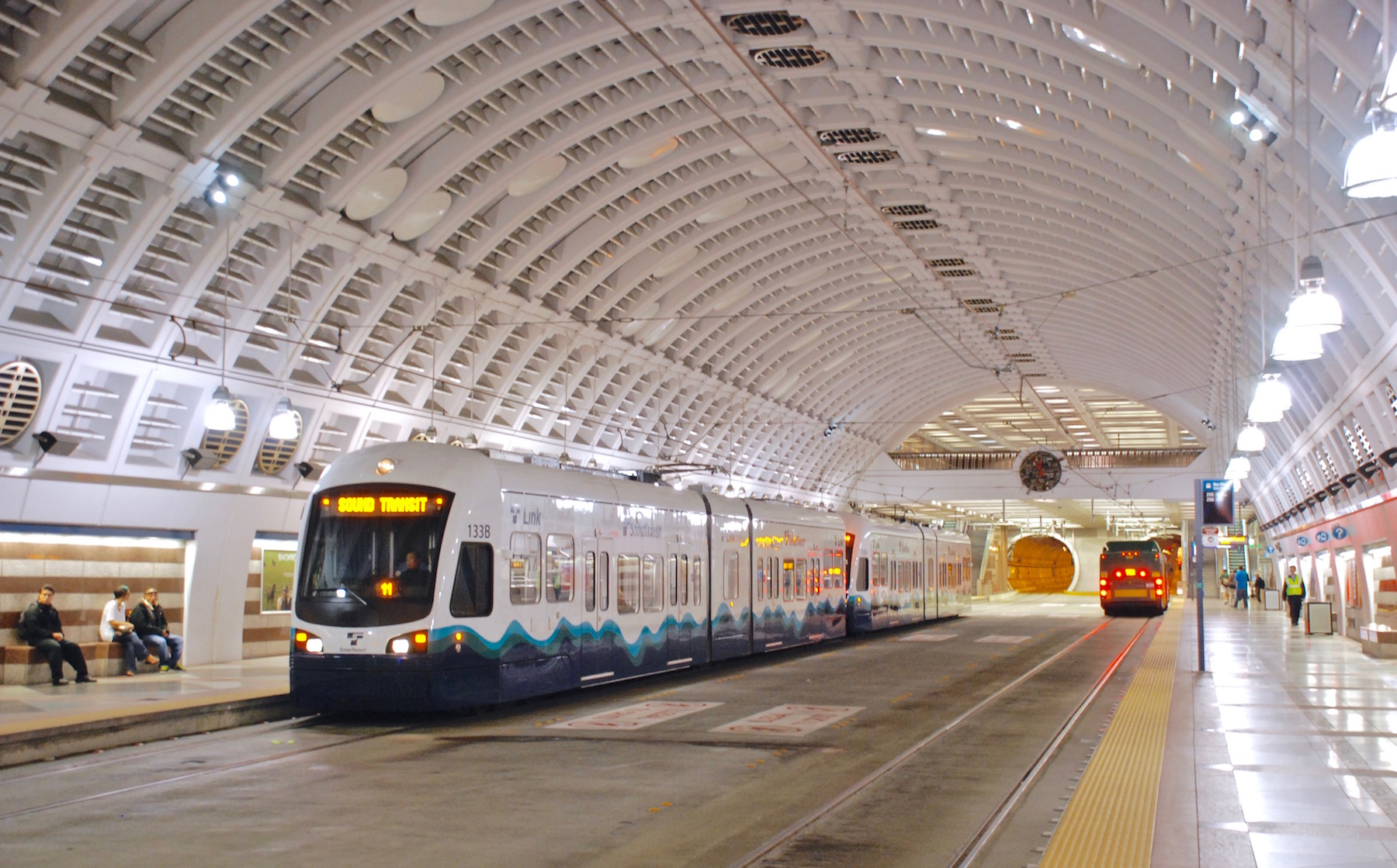
- A light rail train and a King County Metro bus at Pioneer Square station, pictured in 2009

General information
- Location: 3rd Avenue and James Street; Seattle, Washington; United States
- Coordinates: 47°36′10″N 122°19′53″W
- System: Link light rail
- Owner: Sound Transit
- Platforms: 2 side platforms
- Tracks: 2
- Connections: Sound Transit Express; King County Metro; Washington State Ferries; King County Water Taxi; Kitsap Fast Ferries

Construction
- Structure type: Underground
- Parking: Paid parking nearby
- Accessible: Yes

History
- Opened: September 15, 1990
- Rebuilt: 2005–2007

Passengers
- 3,558 daily weekday boardings (2025); 1,155,749 total boardings (2025)

Services
Preceding station	Sound Transit	Following station
Link
Symphony toward Lynnwood City Center	1 Line	International District/Chinatown toward Federal Way Downtown
Symphony toward Lynnwood City Center	2 Line	International District/Chinatown toward Downtown Redmond
Former services
Preceding station	Sound Transit	Following station
ST Express
Symphony toward Convention Place	Route 550 DSTT (1999–2019)	International District/Chinatown toward Bellevue Transit Center
Location

Pioneer Square station is a light rail station that is part of the Downtown Seattle Transit Tunnel in Seattle, Washington, United States. The station is located under 3rd Avenue at James Street, between Symphony and International District/Chinatown stations. It is served by the 1 Line and 2 Line, part of Sound Transit's Link light rail system, and provides connections to local buses and Colman Dock, a major ferry terminal serving areas west of Seattle.

The station consists of two side platforms situated under street level, with two mezzanines connecting to the surface at James Street and Yesler Way in Seattle's Pioneer Square neighborhood. It opened on September 15, 1990, and was used exclusively by buses until 2009. The tunnel and stations closed for almost two years, from 2005 to 2007, for renovation and modifications to accommodate light rail trains. Link light rail service to Pioneer Square station began on July 18, 2009, and bus service ended on March 23, 2019. Trains serve the station twenty hours a day on most days at a frequency of six minutes during peak periods and 12–20 minutes at other times. In early 2020, Pioneer Square station served as a transfer point between trains with a temporary center platform as part of construction for the 2 Line.

== Location ==
Pioneer Square station is located under 3rd Avenue between Cherry Street and Yesler Way in the Pioneer Square neighborhood of Downtown Seattle. The station is at the northern end of the Pioneer Square National Historic District, where the city's oldest buildings are located, and is near the Seattle Underground Tour and the Klondike Gold Rush National Historical Park. To the north and east is the Seattle Civic Center, a complex of city and King County government office buildings, including Seattle City Hall and the King County Courthouse. Pioneer Square station is six blocks east of Colman Dock, the city's primary ferry terminal for Washington State Ferries and King County Water Taxi service.

Much of the non-government and non-historic land use around Pioneer Square station is for high-rise offices and multi-family housing. Within a 1/2-mile (0.8 km) radius of the station is an estimated population of 12,866 people, and approximately 69,795 jobs. Nearby office towers include Smith Tower, the Columbia Center, and Wells Fargo Center. The corporate headquarters of logging company Weyerhaeuser was moved from Federal Way to Occidental Park near Pioneer Square station in 2016; the company cited transit access as one of its main reasons to choose the neighborhood.

== History ==
=== Earlier proposals ===
Pioneer Square was developed as Seattle's initial settlement in the 1850s and continued to serve as the city's downtown into the early 20th century. In 1911, civil engineer Virgil Bogue presented a comprehensive plan for the city of Seattle, including a rapid transit system centered around a "trunk" subway under 3rd Avenue, passing through Pioneer Square and the growing commercial and retail district to the north. The plan was rejected by voters on March 5, 1912, and the 3rd Avenue subway was unsuccessfully proposed twice in the 1920s.

In the late 1960s, the Forward Thrust Committee put forward a ballot measure to fund a rapid transit system in the Seattle metropolitan area, including a downtown subway under 3rd Avenue with a station between Cherry and James streets. The ballot measure, requiring a supermajority to support bonding to augment $385 million in local funding with $765 million from the Urban Mass Transportation Administration, failed to reach the 60 percent threshold in 1968 and again during a second vote in 1970. The failure of the Forward Thrust ballot measures led to the creation of Metro Transit in 1972, operating bus service across King County.

=== Bus tunnel ===
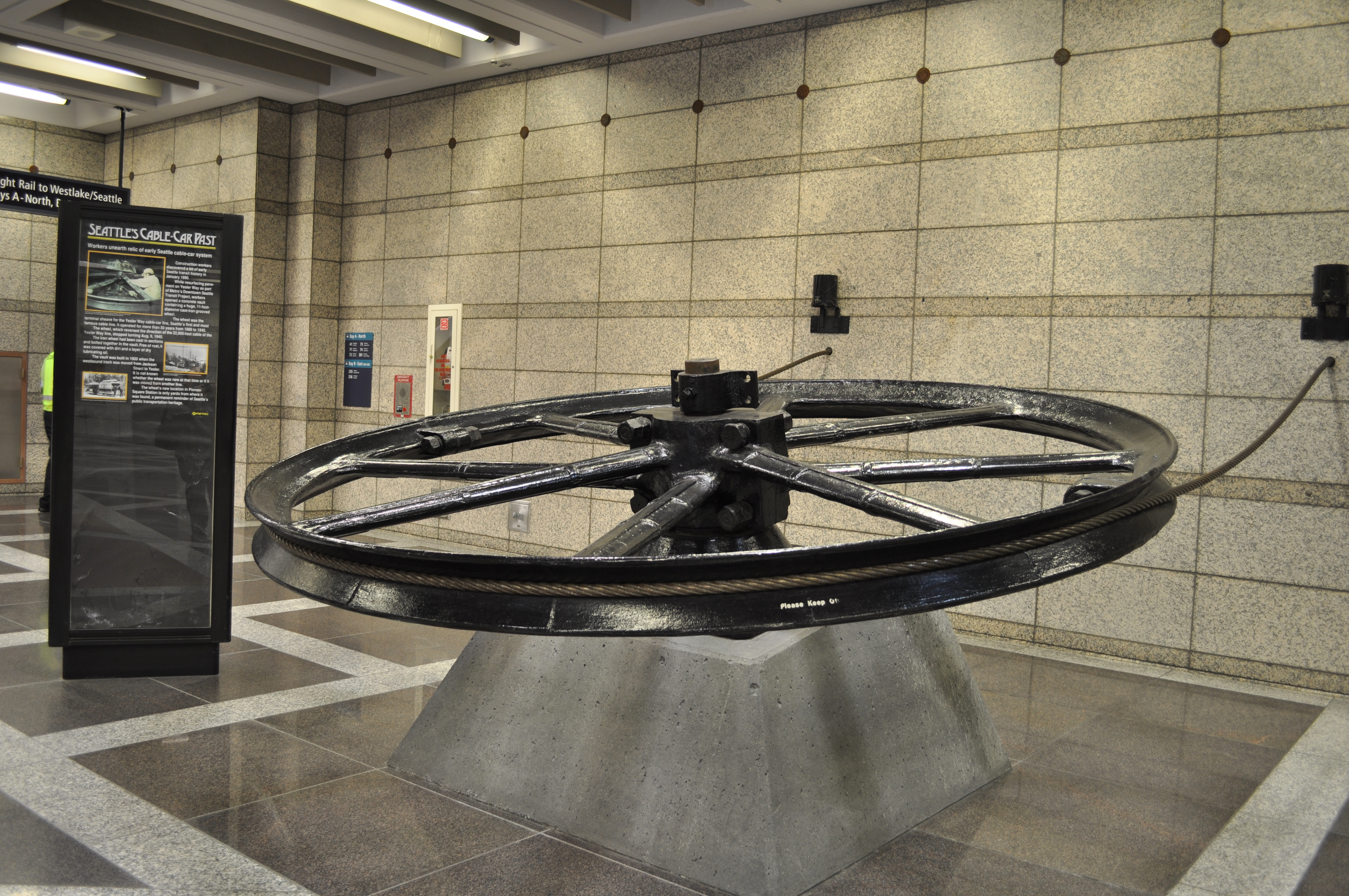
A preserved cable car flywheel on display at Pioneer Square station after its discovery during tunnel construction

Metro Transit began planning a bus tunnel through downtown Seattle in the 1970s, to be eventually converted to use by light rail trains. Metro approved the construction of a bus tunnel under 3rd Avenue in 1983, and chose to site one of the tunnel's five stations near the King County Courthouse at 3rd Avenue and James Street. The station was to be completed by late 1989 and use brick, stone, and tile to complement the design of nearby Pioneer Square.

Metro awarded a $44.1 million contract to a joint venture of Atkinson and Dillingham companies to build the tunnel's 3rd Avenue segment as well as Pioneer Square station. Excavation of the station from street level began in March 1987, and the project's twin tunnel boring machines reached James Street from Union Station in September. In June 1987, Atkinson-Dillingham and Metro were fined $80,000 after drilling at the station severed three electric power transmission lines, causing a day-long power outage in downtown Seattle, affecting the City Hall and Public Safety Building. Work in the tunnel station was also blamed for shaking in the City Hall and Public Safety Building, requiring monitoring equipment to be set up by Metro.

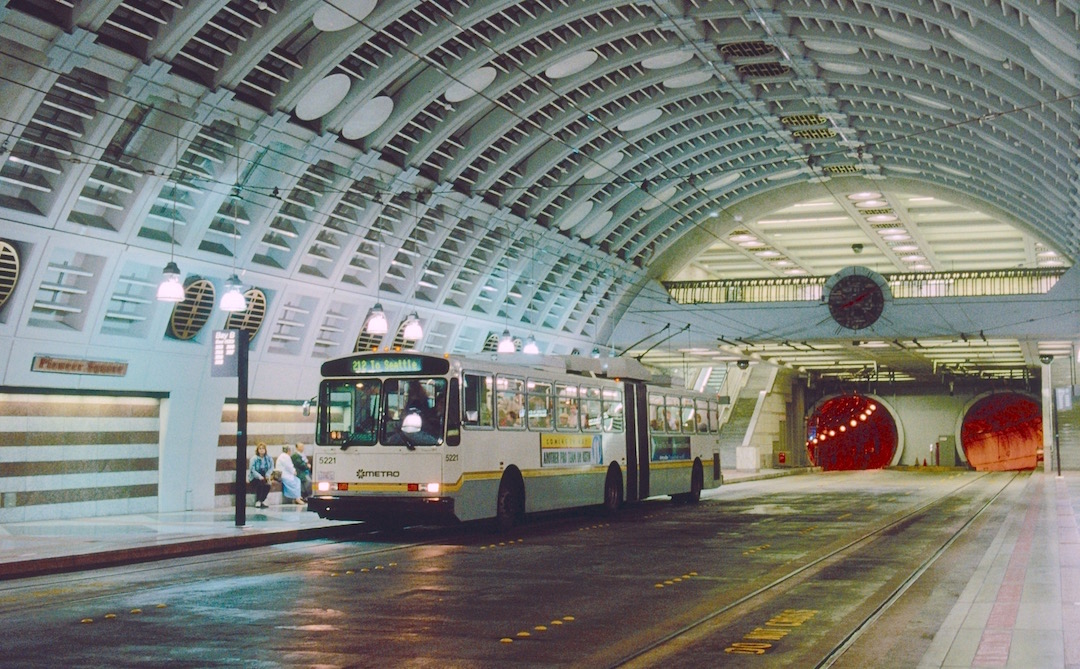
A dual-mode bus at the rear stop of the northbound platform in 1994

By late 1988, the Pioneer Square station structure was 70 percent complete, and work had begun on the station's entrances and the vaulted ceiling. The station was the subject of two controversies during its construction over the use of South African materials in its construction, as the country was then under a Metro boycott for its Apartheid policies. In late 1987, Atkinson-Dillingham was forced to remove steel beams used for temporary shoring at the station box after unknowingly sourcing it from South Africa. Metro later acquired South African black granite to be used in the station's platform and mezzanine, which was discovered and returned; the incident resulted in the resignation of Metro's executive director, amid outcry from African American leaders.

Tunnel construction was completed in June 1990, and was celebrated with a soft opening of Pioneer Square station and the re-opening of Prefontaine Park. During preparation for the resurfacing of 3rd Avenue above the new tunnel station, workers discovered an 11-foot (3.4 m) cable car flywheel that had been buried after service on the Yesler Way line ceased in 1940. The flywheel was later restored and placed in the south mezzanine of Pioneer Square station. Bus service in the Downtown Seattle Transit Tunnel began on September 15, 1990, with several Metro bus routes moved into the tunnel from surface streets. At the time of its opening, Pioneer Square station had the longest and steepest escalator west of the Mississippi River. All service on routes using the tunnel was operated by dual-mode buses, which operated as diesel buses outside the tunnel and electrically, as trolleybuses, when inside the tunnel. During its early months, Pioneer Square and other stations were affected by serious water leaks, which splashed water onto walkways during the tunnel's first winter in operation. The leaks were later fixed by Metro contractors, but remained visible in the form of rust stains on the station ceiling.

=== Light rail ===
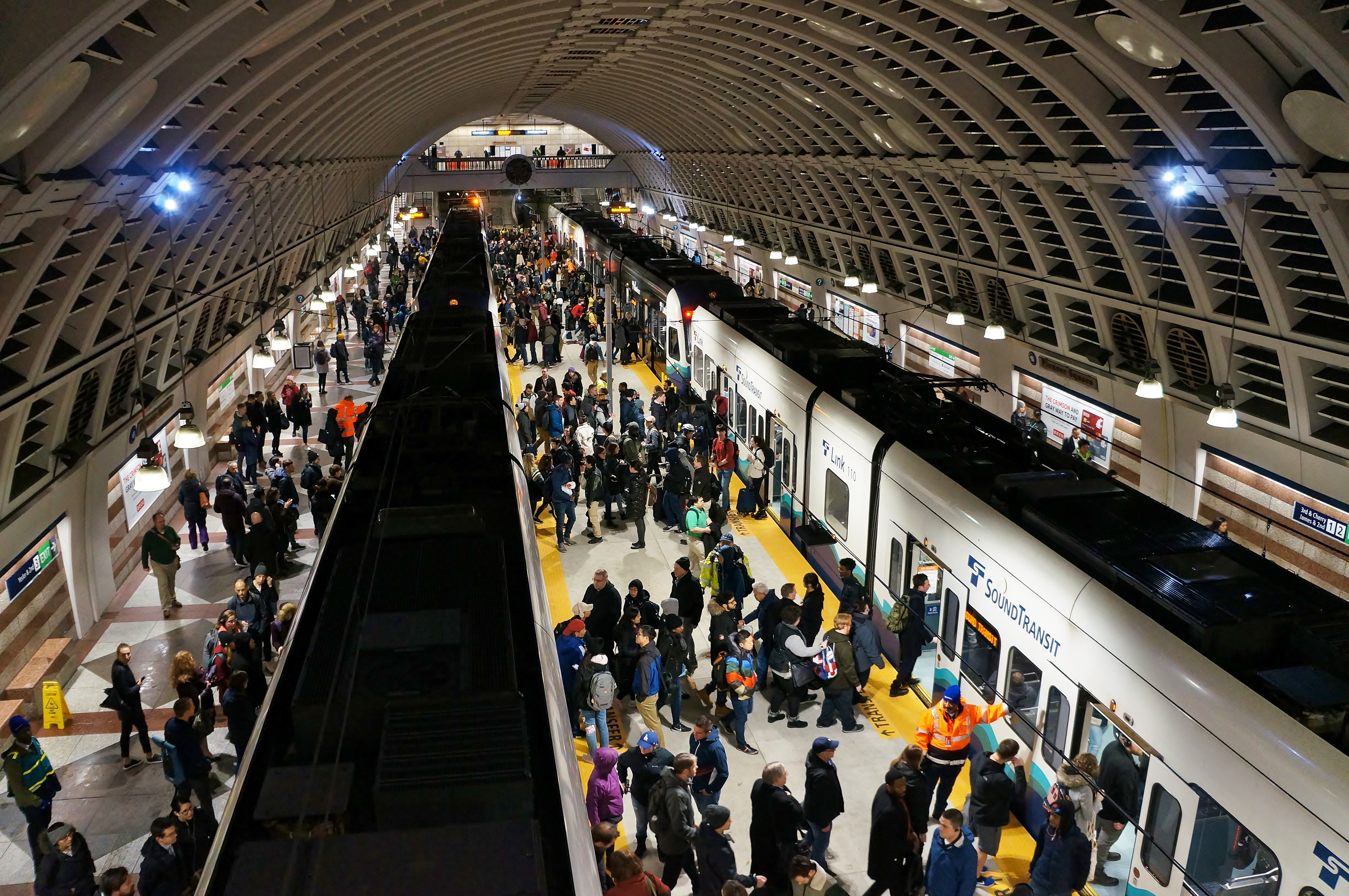
A third platform was installed at Pioneer Square for use during a light rail construction project in early 2020

In the early 1990s, a regional transit authority (RTA) was formed to plan and construct a light rail system for the Seattle area. After an unsuccessful attempt in 1995, regional voters passed a $3.9 billion plan to build light rail under the RTA in 1996. The downtown transit tunnel had already been planned for eventual light rail use and was built with tracks that would be incorporated into the initial system. The RTA, later renamed Sound Transit, approved the tunnel as part of the route of its initial light rail line in 1999. Ownership of the tunnel, including its stations, was transferred to Sound Transit in 2000 but returned two years later to King County Metro under a joint-operations agreement.

The Public Safety Building, located at the station's northeast entrance, was demolished in 2005. In its place, the city planned to build Seattle Civic Square, a mixed-use skyscraper, with a new entrance to the station. As of 2016, the project is on hold and a temporary entrance has been erected at street level.

The downtown transit tunnel closed on September 23, 2005, for a two-year, $82.7 million renovation to accommodate light rail vehicles. The renovation included the installation of new rails, a lowered roadbed at stations for level boarding, new signalling systems and emergency ventilation. The tunnel reopened on September 24, 2007, and Link light rail service began on July 18, 2009, from Westlake station to Tukwila International Boulevard station.

Bus service within the downtown transit tunnel ended on March 23, 2019, due to the expansion of the Washington State Convention Center at the site of Convention Place station, which includes demolition of the north portal. The tunnel became exclusively served by light rail trains, while the remaining seven bus routes were relocated to surface streets and nearby bus stops on 2nd, 3rd, 4th, and 5th avenues.

As part of East Link Extension construction for the 2 Line in early 2020, Pioneer Square station was outfitted with a temporary third platform in the center to allow passengers on terminating single-tracked trains to transfer. The temporary platform was installed during two weekend closures in October 2019 and was used from January to March 2020. Ownership of the tunnel and Pioneer Square station was transferred to Sound Transit in 2022. The 2 Line entered simulated service on February 14, 2026, with passengers able to board trains from Lynnwood to International District/Chinatown station.

A 2022 proposal for the Ballard Link Extension includes a new transfer station one block east of Pioneer Square to be used by trains on the realigned 1 Line in lieu of a transfer at International District/Chinatown station.

== Station layout ==
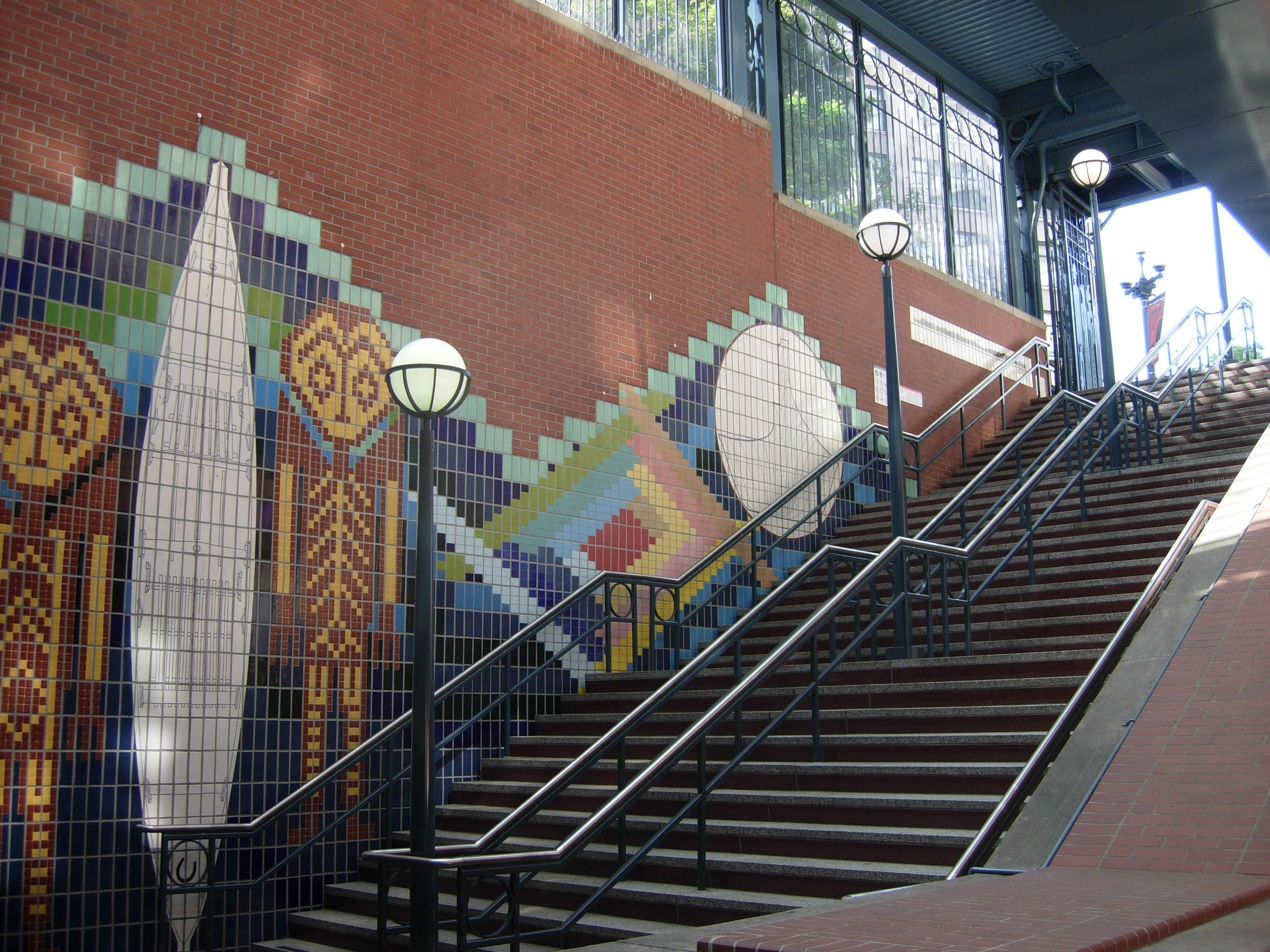
Laura Sindell's ceramic mural, located in the south mezzanine entrance

Pioneer Square station consists of two underground side platforms used to load passengers onto trains and buses, a mezzanine level, and several surface entrances. The station has two mezzanines on its north and south ends, with the center portion opened to the platform below; all levels are connected by a series of eight escalators, six elevators, and stairs. The north mezzanine under James Street has two entrances: a pair of escalators and a stairway to 3rd Avenue at the future site of Seattle Civic Square; and a single escalator and stairway to 2nd Avenue in the Lyon Building. The south mezzanine has a single entrance to Prefontaine Park at Yesler Way between 2nd and 3rd avenues, under a large pergola similar to an older streetcar shelter in Pioneer Square. The Prefontaine Park entrance houses an 8-by-50-foot (2.4 by 15.2 m) ceramic mural created by artist Laura Sindell, depicting people-like figures, a 19th-century quilt pattern, a Coast Salish basket design, and a dugout canoe. Several of the station's entrances feature inscribed quotes from historic Seattle figures, including Chief Seattle, "Doc" Maynard, and Arthur A. Denny. The south mezzanine also has a large flywheel once used by the Yesler Way cable car and later buried in a vault until its discovery during tunnel construction. Pioneer Square station is approximately 570 feet (170 m) long, 70 feet (21 m) wide, and 60 to 70 feet (18 to 21 m) deep.

Designed by architect Jerry McDevitt, the station has an arched vault ceiling that is meant to reflect the area's historic buildings. The platform level also makes extensive use of red and gray granite, matching the King County Courthouse and former Public Safety Building, and railings that resemble hitching posts and hanging lamps. Artists Kate Ericson and Mel Ziegler created the station's two "artifact clocks", which hang from the mezzanine at each end of the platform. The north mezzanine clock uses materials from modern construction, including granite, steel beams, and electrical wires; the south mezzanine clock incorporates artifacts found during construction dating back to the city's early history, including cobblestones, brick, and cast-iron pipes. Both clocks use various tools used during construction, including a handsaw and industrial-size tape measure, for the clock face's numerals.

The station's former pictogram, which depicts a frigate

The station's former pictogram, a frigate sailing ship, pays homage to Seattle's roots as a timber supplier for shipbuilders. It was created in 2009 by Christian French as part of the Stellar Connections series and its points represented nearby destinations, including Seattle City Hall, Colman Dock, the Klondike Gold Rush National Historical Park, and King Street Station. The pictogram series was retired in 2024 and replaced by station numbers.

== Services ==
Pioneer Square is one of four stations in the Downtown Seattle Transit Tunnel, which is served by the Link light rail system's 1 Line and 2 Line. It is situated between Symphony and International District/Chinatown stations; it is the eleventh southbound station from Lynnwood City Center, the terminus of both lines. Link light rail trains serve Pioneer Square station 20 hours a day on weekdays and Saturdays, from 5:00 a.m. to 12:00 a.m.; and 18 hours on Sundays, from 6:00 a.m. to 12:00 a.m. During regular weekday service, trains on each line operate roughly every eight minutes during rush hour, ten minutes during midday operation, and twelve to fifteen minutes in the early morning and at night. On weekends, trains on each line arrive at Pioneer Square station every ten minutes during midday hours and every twelve to fifteen minutes during mornings and evenings. The two lines combine for frequencies of four minutes during rush hour and five minutes during midday and weekend service. The station is approximately 33 minutes from Lynnwood City Center station, 25 minutes from Bellevue Downtown station, and 36 minutes from SeaTac/Airport station. In 2025, an average of 3,558 passengers boarded Link trains at Pioneer Square station on weekdays.

The station is near Colman Dock and Pier 50, the main ferry terminals for Seattle. Colman Dock is served by Washington State Ferries routes to Bainbridge Island and Bremerton; Kitsap Fast Ferries and King County Water Taxi both use Pier 50, a passenger-only ferry terminal. Pioneer Square station is also adjacent to several surface bus stops near its entrances, served by King County Metro and Sound Transit Express routes. Metro's RapidRide system connects the area to West Seattle on the C Line, Ballard on the D Line, the Aurora Avenue corridor on the E Line, and Burien on the H Line. The area is also served by several east–west bus routes that travel towards First Hill, the Central District, and Leschi. Regional and express routes use 2nd Avenue and 4th Avenue, with stops near James Street; these include Sound Transit Express service to Federal Way and Pierce County. During disruptions to light rail service, King County Metro also runs a special route between all light rail stations that stops on 3rd Avenue between Jefferson and James streets to serve Pioneer Square station. A proposed Seattle Streetcar line would serve a stop at 1st Avenue and Yesler Way, one block from the station's Prefontaine Park entrance.

From 2009 to 2019, several bus routes also ran in the tunnel alongside Link light rail. The final set of bus routes in the tunnel were divided into three bays by their outbound direction: Bay A was served by three routes heading north toward Northgate and the University District and east towards Kirkland (routes 41, 74, and 255); Bay C was served by three routes heading south through the SODO Busway toward Kent and Renton (routes 101, 102, and 150); and Bay D was served by one route heading east via Interstate 90 to Bellevue (Sound Transit Express route 550). The bus routes were relocated in March 2019 to new stops on 2nd, 3rd, and 5th avenues to serve Pioneer Square and the surrounding area.
