= Seattle Civic Center =

Building complex in Seattle, Washington, United States

Coordinates: 47°36′13″N 122°19′47″W

The Seattle Civic Center is a building complex in Seattle, Washington whose original master plan was designed by Édouard Frère Champney in 1910. The complex comprises several buildings owned by the City of Seattle and King County that cover several city blocks. The buildings include:

- King County Administration Building (1971)
- King County Correctional Facility
- King County Courthouse (1916)
- Seattle City Hall (2005)
- Seattle Justice Center (2002)
- Seattle Municipal Tower (1990)
- 400 Yesler Building (1909)

The complex also contained the Public Safety Building until it was demolished in 2005. The Seattle Civic Square Tower is proposed to be built on the site.

In 2023, County Executive Dow Constantine announced a plan to redevelop the eight blocks owned by the county government, including the introduction of mixed-use development. The proposal includes potential commercial and residential buildings, a new platform for Pioneer Square station at the site of the King County Administration Building, and demolition of the county jail.
