= Seattle Municipal Tower =

Skyscraper in downtown Seattle, Washington

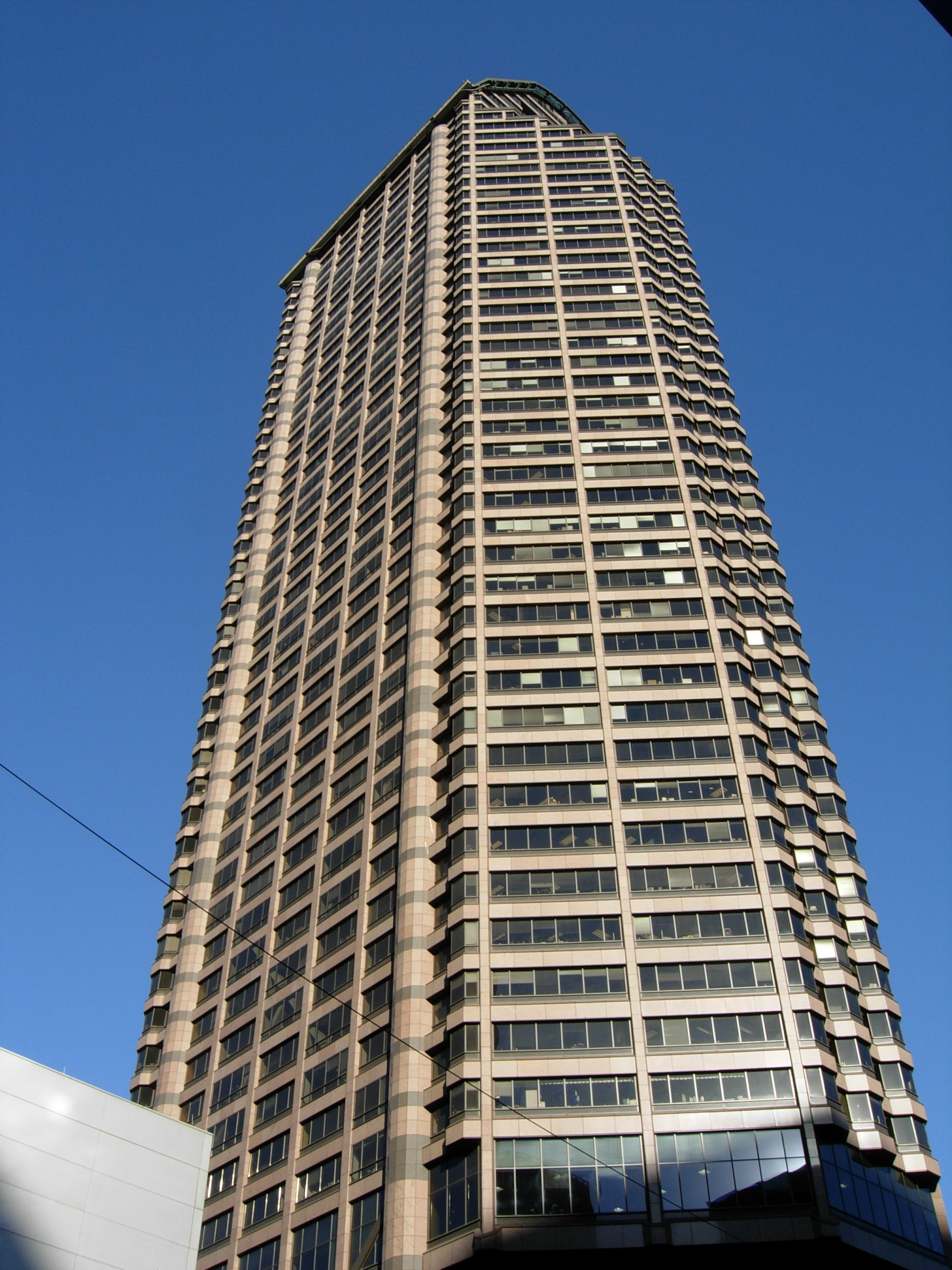

- Location within Downtown Seattle
- Former names: AT&T Gateway Tower; Key Bank Tower

General information
- Type: Government
- Location: 700 Fifth Avenue; Seattle Civic Center; Seattle, Washington, U.S.
- Coordinates: 47.6051°N 122.3298°W
- Construction started: 1987
- Completed: 1990
- Owner: City of Seattle Government
- Operator: CB Richard Ellis

Height
- Roof: 220.07 m (722.0 ft)

Technical details
- Floor count: 62
- Floor area: 92,024 m^{2} (990,540 sq ft)

Design and construction
- Architect: Bassetti Architects
- Structural engineer: Magnusson Klemencic Associates
- Main contractor: University Mechanical Contractors

Seattle Municipal Tower is a skyscraper in downtown Seattle, Washington. At 220.07 m (722.0 ft), it is the fifth-tallest building in the city. Completed in 1990, it was initially named AT&T Gateway Tower and subsequently KeyBank Tower after its anchor tenants AT&T and KeyBank. It was given its current name on May 17, 2004.

== History ==
The skyscraper was proposed as early as 1981 under the preliminary name of "Sixth & Columbia Building" by developer Sixth and Columbia Associates under the lead of Herman Sarkowsky and Delbert Belfoy. The site of the skyscraper was originally occupied by the 95-unit Doris and Breslin Apartments on the northeast quarter; the rest of the block, owned by the Washington State Department of Transportation (WSDOT), included a small park and reversible express ramps to Interstate 5 (I-5). Two office tower proposals were presented for the site in the draft environmental impact statement: a 55-story one with 500,000 square feet (46,000 m^{2}) of space on the site of the apartments; and a 65-story one with 1,100,000 square feet (100,000 m^{2}) square feet of space on the northern half of the site, with the southern half occupied by a low-rise parking garage and a shopping arcade. The 65-story proposal cantilevered over the I-5 ramps, requiring the developer to lease the air rights of the ramps from WSDOT; it also included a skyway across Columbia Street to the Seafirst Fifth Avenue Plaza Building.

The proposals resulted in the apartments' tenants, represented by the Seattle Displacement Coalition, filing a lawsuit in King County Superior Court on January 21, 1981, against Sarkowsky and Belfoy; they also sued the apartments' owner, CHG International, of which Sarkowsky and Belfoy were board members. The tenants claimed that CHG violated a 1979 agreement with the coalition to maintain the apartments, refrain from evicting tenants without cause or replacement housing, and create alternative affordable housing options.

The City of Seattle purchased Key Tower in early 1996 to house utilities and general government functions. The purchase price was $124 million, or $124 per square foot. The city purchased the property during a downturn in the economy, citing recommendations from two panels: the citizens' group, Capital Finance Review Board, which concluded that purchasing the building would cost a minimum of $47 million less than constructing new facilities and a minimum of $121 million less than renovating existing city facilities; and the Citizens Advisory Panel, which concluded that the building "(met) the great majority of the city's space needs."

The building is attached to the Seattle Civic Center complex and is owned by the city. It houses several government offices including the Seattle Department of Construction and Inspections, Seattle City Light, Seattle Public Utilities, the Department of IT, Human Services Department, and the Office of Economic Development. The Seattle City Council and offices of the Mayor of Seattle are located in the nearby Seattle City Hall.

== Design ==
The Municipal Tower was designed by Bassetti/Norton/Metler/Rekevics Architects, who inherited the project via its acquisition of original architect Karlis Rekevics in December 1984. Bassetti also designed the Henry M. Jackson Federal Building and was the co-architect for the current Seattle City Hall.

- The stairs between the plaza, lobby and tunnel levels are unusual and its site has the challenge of straddling a freeway entrance ramp.
- The main lobby is floor 4, not floor 1 as is usual in American buildings.
- The elevators are divided into lower and upper tiers. In order to reach floors above 40, visitors must take an elevator to the "sky lobby" on 40 and transfer to a second elevator to continue upward. Also, to reach floor 62 or "The Tip", one must transfer to a private elevator at floor 61 using an encoded badge.
- The building's three restaurants are on an upper plaza (6th floor) and only one has an inside entrance.
- The plaza and tunnel levels can not be reached by the main elevators. They also require an elevator transfer, in this case the parking-garage elevators on floor 4; or via the decorative staircase.
- The glass cupola at the building's crest is not occupied space; it contains elevator equipment.

== See also ==
- List of tallest buildings in the United States
