= Black Lives Matter street mural (Seattle City Hall) =

Mural in Seattle, Washington, U.S.

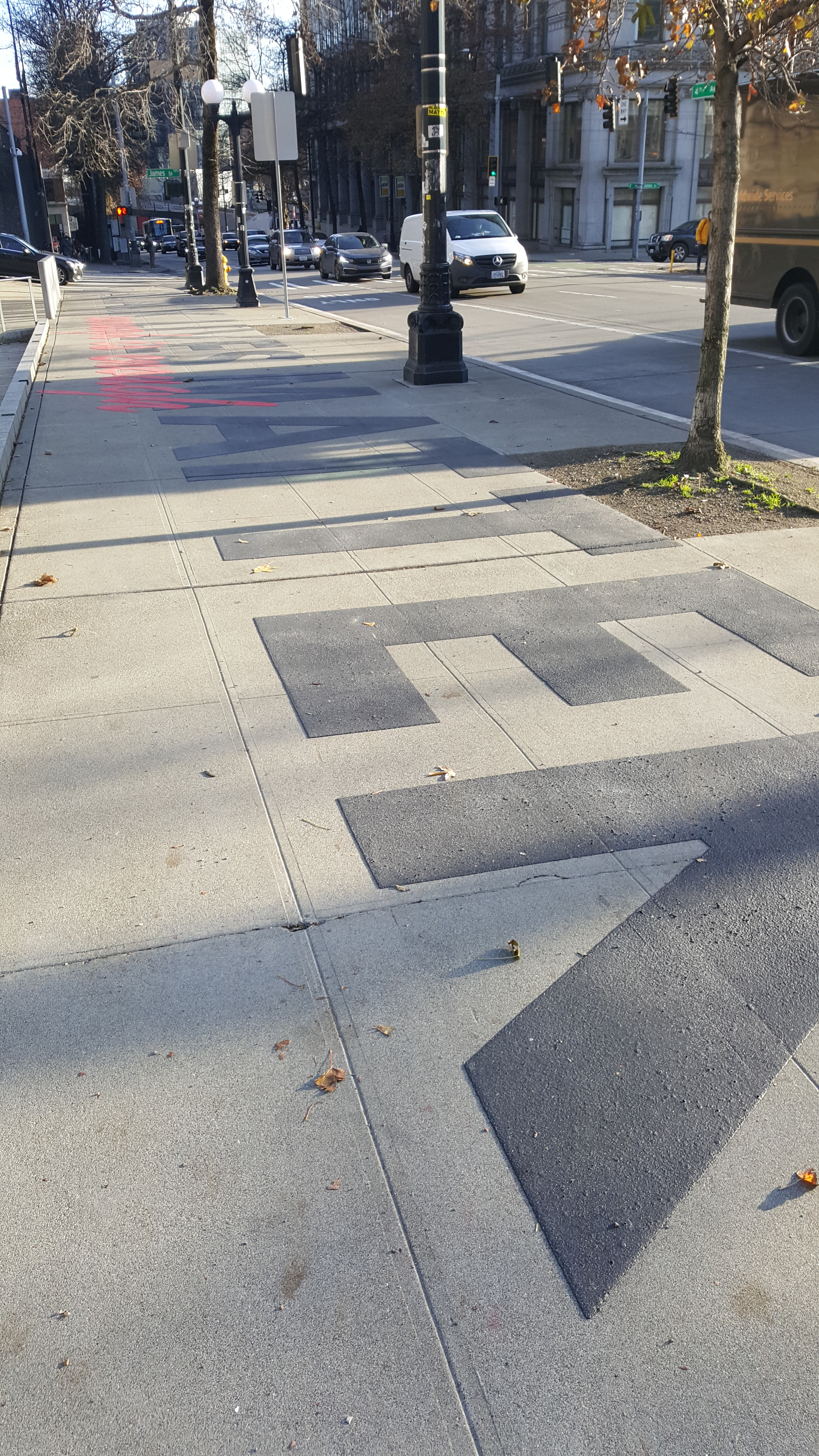
- The mural in 2022
- Year: 2021
- Location: Seattle, Washington, U.S.; 47°36′12.5″N 122°19′49.2″W

A Black Lives Matter mural was painted outside Seattle City Hall, in the U.S. state of Washington, in 2021.

== Description and history ==
The mural which reads "Black Lives Matter, enough is enough" is painted outside Seattle City Hall, along Fourth Avenue between Cherry Street and James Street in downtown. The text "Black Lives Matter" is black and the text "enough is enough" appears in red script.

The work was commissioned by community groups, including the Center on Contemporary Art and the Onyx Fine Arts Collective (OFAC). It was designed by a muralist from the Seattle Department of Transportation, which is expected to provide maintenance.

OFAC president Earnest D. Thomas called the mural "a concerted global statement and reminder to our leaders and all people of the need for systemic change in racial justice".

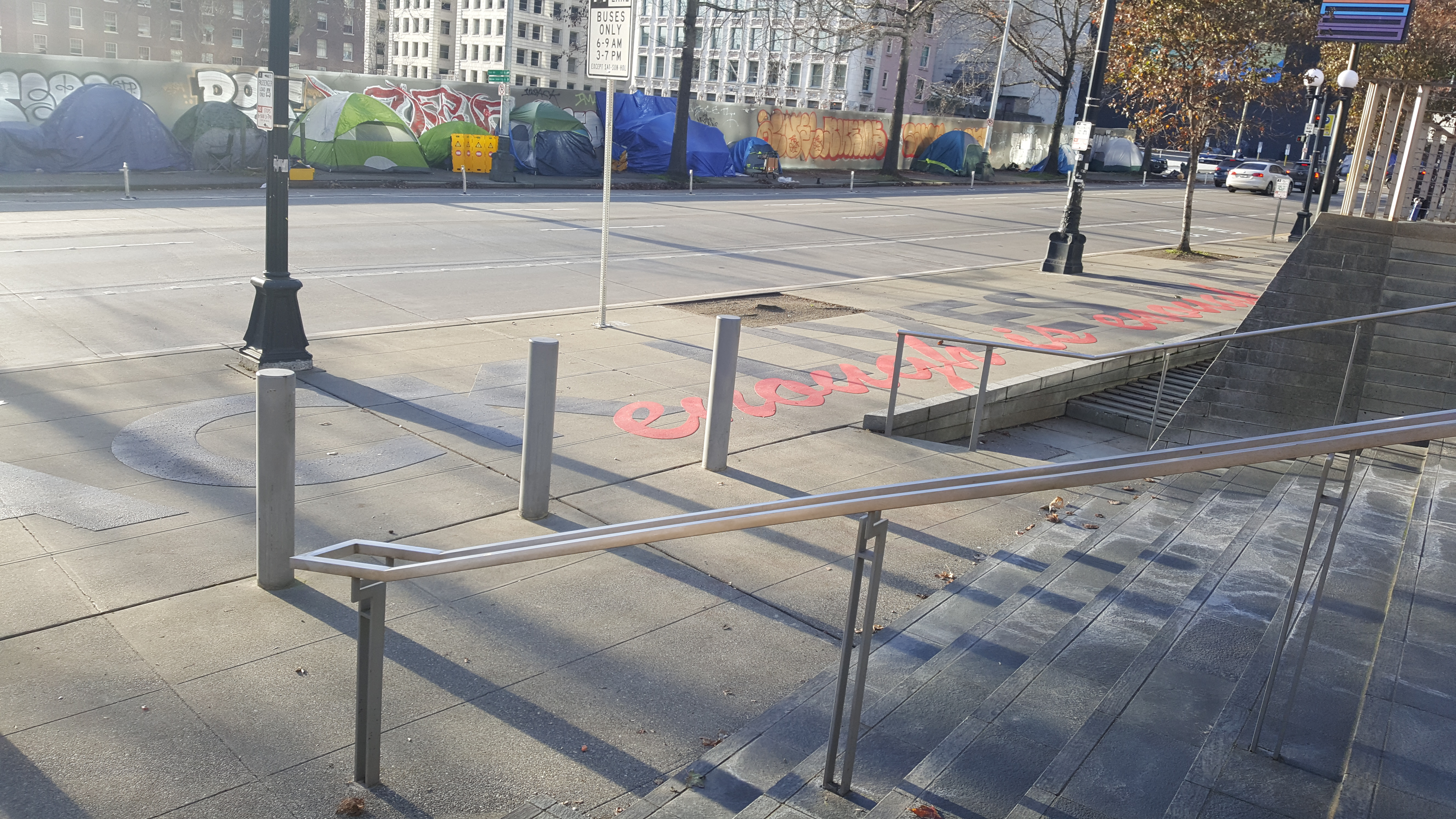
Mural, 2022

== See also ==
- 2021 in art
