= David E. Skinner II =

American philanthropist (1920–1988)

Seattle plack

David E. "Ned" Skinner II (1920 – August 7, 1988) was a shipping heir and philanthropist in Seattle, Washington who was one of the first owners of the Space Needle and Seattle Seahawks.

He was born in Seattle and attended Lakeside School. He was the grandson of David E. Skinner (1867–1933) who owned the Skinner & Eddy shipyard, the Pacific Steamship Co., and the Port Blakely Mill Company. Skinner graduated Dartmouth College in 1942 and served aboard a destroyer during World War II. He married Kayla Lagasa in 1942.

After the death of his father G. W. Skinner in 1953, he took over the Alaska Steamship Company. When it went into decline ultimately closing in 1971 he branched into real estate with the Skinner Corporation owning the Skinner Building and 5th Avenue Theatre, Pepsi Bottling, and NC Machinery. The company was listed as the tenth largest privately owned company in 1988.

During preparation for the Century 21 Seattle World’s Fair in 1960, Skinner joined the Pentagram Corporation to build the Space Needle. He sold his interest in 1977 to Howard S. Wright whose company still controls the Seattle skyline's icon.

In 1972 Skinner and Herman Sarkowsky were the two original investors in the Seattle Seahawks as they formed the organization Seattle Professional Football. They would be joined by four others. After the NFL awarded the franchise to Seattle the group formed a partnership with the Nordstrom family having controlling interest.

Skinner was active in philanthropies throughout Seattle noting:

If all corporations gave just two percent of their pre-tax earnings there isn't a school, hospital, retirement home or museum that would have to conduct a fund-raising drive. The money would be there.

Among his philanthropies were the Seattle Opera, the Pacific Northwest Ballet, the Seattle Repertory Theater, Pacific Science Center, and Seattle Art Museum. He founded the Skinner Foundation in 1956 and donated 5 percent of the Skinner Corporation's profits to the foundation.
