= Flo Ware =

American activist, radio show host and foster mother

- Flo Ware, 1974
- Born: December 7, 1912
- Died: 1981 (aged 68–69)
- Occupations: Activist, radio host

Flo Ware (born Florasina Ware; December 7, 1912 - 1981) was an American activist, radio show host, and foster mother in Seattle, Washington.

== Early life ==
Florasina Ware was born on December 7, 1912 in Fort Worth, Texas. Her family moved frequently for her father's work until Ware was in high school. After attending some college, she married and moved to Tacoma. In 1947, she moved to Seattle. During the 1950s, she owned a sandwich shop on Jackson Street.^{:152}

== Activism ==
Ware led a number of campaigns in Seattle to improve living conditions for children, the elderly and the poor. She pressed school officials in the Central Area schools to improve their academic programs, and later became an organizer of the Central Area School Board. She called for quality care for aged people and led the Meals on Wheels program in the city. She also called for more employment support for the poor. Ware frequently spoke at organizations and schools but did not charge for her sessions, and thus often had limited income.^{:152}

Ware was involved with the Foster Parent Association and raised 20 foster children in her home. From 1968 to 1979 she hosted a radio talk show on Seattle station KRAB. In 1968 she led a group of around 50 indigenous and black people in a convoy of buses to Washington, D.C., to voice grievances about their living conditions; the group became known as the Poor People's Campaign. She also stated that she had served as vice president for Seattle's Congress of Racial Equality (CORE) that year.^{:115}

=== Peace and Freedom Party ===
Ware grew disillusioned with the lack of engagement that liberal political leaders showed toward poor and Black communities, and decided to support a third political party instead. She joined the socialist Peace and Freedom Party in 1968. On that party's ticket, she ran for the U.S. House of Representatives in Washington's 7th congressional district. She ran with the hope of drawing people into radical politics and supporting her party rather than winning the seat. Ware lost the race after receiving 709 votes.^{:153–155}

=== Women's Liberation ===
In 1968, the Women's Majority Union was founded in the Seattle as a New Left women's liberation group that focused on political writing. Ware signed onto their 1968 Lilith's Manifesto. She also served on the Peace and Freedom Party's Women's Liberation Committee along with other manifesto signers like Dotty DeCoster, Alice Armstrong, and Sheila Kritchman.

=== School and neighborhood advocacy ===
In 1969, Seattle Public Schools hired Ware as a consultant to train teachers to better support students of different race, culture, and class backgrounds. She also explained the benefits of school desegregation, and against busing, special education classes, and advanced track classes.^{:153}

In the 1970s she sat on the King County Equal Opportunity Board and was involved in the Model Cities Program. The Seattle Model Cities Neighborhood focused on the Central Area, Chinatown–International District, and Pioneer Square. Ware served on the program's Health Advisory Board and was part of a movement of welfare rights activists, many of whom were poor Black women in Seattle, who lobbied for anti-poverty measures across the state. Ware provided free lectures on poverty in the Central Area via this program, but she also condemned it in the late 1960s for expanding welfare instead of decreasing poverty.^{:166}

== Personal life ==
Ware was married to Waymon Ware, who was also involved in leftist political activism. She died on March 17, 1981, and was buried at Mount Pleasant Cemetery.

== Legacy ==
Ware received over 75 awards for her service and activism. The Seattle Medium presented Ware with its first Dr. Martin Luther King Humanitarian Award for her anti-poverty work.^{:175}

In 1982, a Seattle park was named for her. A piece of public art at Symphony station also pays tribute to her work.
