= 3rd & Cherry =

Proposed 629-foot (192 m) tall, 57-story skyscraper in downtown Seattle, Washington

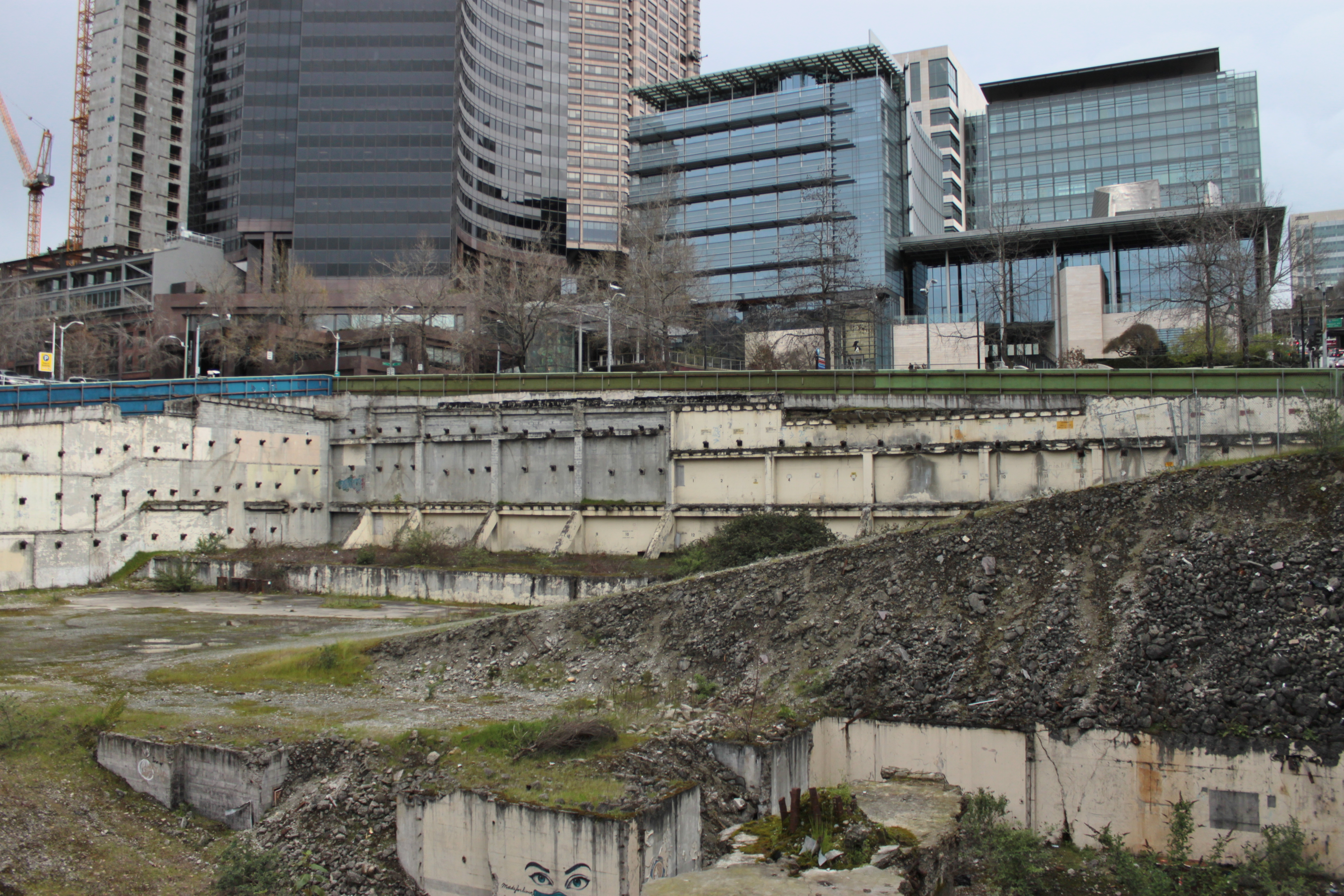
- Cleared site for Civic Square, seen in 2016 with Seattle City Hall in the background

- Location within Downtown Seattle
- Former names: Seattle Civic Square

General information
- Status: Proposed
- Location: Seattle, Washington, U.S., 601 Fourth Avenue
- Coordinates: 47.6034°N 122.3312°W

Height
- Roof: 629 feet (192 m)

Technical details
- Floor count: 57

Design and construction
- Architect: James K.M. Cheng
- Developer: Bosa Development

3rd & Cherry, formerly Seattle Civic Square, is a planned 629-foot (192 m) tall, 57-story skyscraper in downtown Seattle, Washington, United States. The residential high-rise, located near Seattle City Hall and the Seattle Civic Center, will have 520 condominiums and amenity spaces, including a public plaza at ground level and retail spaces. It was originally proposed in 2007 but has been delayed due to political and financial issues, undergoing several redesigns under various developers. It is set to be built by Bosa Development and was scheduled to open in 2026. The skyscraper will be located right next to an entrance to the Pioneer Square station on Seattle's Link light rail network.

== Triad proposal ==
The site, at 3rd Avenue and Cherry Street, was formerly home to the Public Safety Building, which was demolished in 2005. A 43-story residential and office tower, named the Seattle Civic Square, was approved in 2009, with developer Triad Development and a design team led by Foster + Partners and GGLO. The original building plan included space for retail, offices, and residences, as well as a 30,000-square-foot (2,800 m^{2}) public plaza. The Civic Square project was put on hold during the Great Recession as the developers search for financing or a tenant.

In late 2015, Mayor Ed Murray announced he would not renew the contract with Triad Development after an employee of Triad's was accused of coercing Seattle City Council candidate Jonathan Grant into settling a lawsuit with the Tenants Union of Washington over the renewal of the project's construction permit. A different group of displaced tenants filed a suit against the city and Triad, alleging special treatment from the city for the project; the suit was settled in October 2015, with Triad paying $5.5 million into a housing affordability fund if the project is built. Touchstone Development was granted Triad's interest in the project in March 2016, and began searching for possible tenants and financing.

== Bosa proposal ==
In May 2016, Mayor Ed Murray announced that Touchstone would not continue developing the project, having failed to secure financing and tenants within the 60-day deadline. On October 28, 2016, Mayor Murray announced that Bosa Development would take over the contract and develop the building, paying into an equitable development fund and affordable housing. The project would be subject to design approval and could begin construction as early as 2018. Under the new deal, Bosa would pay $16 million to build a new condominium tower (with a new design) on the property, and contribute $5.7 million to an affordable housing fund.

In 2017, Bosa unveiled their new proposal, designed by James K.M. Cheng, with no office space. The proposal, for a curving 58-story building with 423 condominiums and 586 parking stalls, went through repeated design changes during the review process. The project site and development rights were sold to Bosa in December 2019, but the project has not been granted a land-use permit as of October 2020.

The shoring and excavation permit for the project was issued in March 2022 and Bosa announced that it would begin construction the following month. The tower was initially planned to open by 2026. In July 2022, Bosa announced a pause in construction due to "price escalations" and a volatile market. As of September 2026, work has not resumed.

== See also ==
- List of tallest buildings in Seattle
