= Herman Sarkowsky =

American businessman and philanthropist (1925–2014)

- Born: June 9, 1925; Gera, Thuringia, Germany
- Died: November 2, 2014 (aged 89); Seattle, Washington, United States of America
- Education: Broadway High School, University of Washington
- Occupations: Real estate developer, NBA team owner/founder, racehorse owner/breeder, philanthropist
- Known for: Key Tower, Portland Trail Blazers, Seattle Seahawks
- Board member of: Herman and Faye Sarkowsky Charitable Foundation, National Association of Home Builders, HLTH Corporation, University of Washington School of Medicine, Seattle Art Museum, Seattle Symphony
- Spouse: Faye Mondschein
- Children: Cathy Sarkowsky; Steve Sarkowsky

Herman Sarkowsky (June 9, 1925 – November 2, 2014) was a Seattle, Washington, United States businessman, philanthropist, thoroughbred breeder, and former sports executive. He was a co-founder of two Pacific Northwest sports franchises, the Portland Trail Blazers and the Seattle Seahawks.

== Early life and education ==
Sarkowsky was born to a Jewish family in Gera, Thuringia, Germany, in 1925. In 1934, his family immigrated to New York City after Adolf Hitler came to power. In 1937, his family moved to Seattle, Washington. He served in the U.S. Army Signal Corps during World War II. A 1949 graduate of the University of Washington, he entered the home building and construction trade the following year.

== Career ==
In the 1960s, Sarkowsky founded United Homes Corporation which became the largest homebuilding company in the Northwest. He developed the Key Tower (now Seattle Municipal Tower) in Seattle, and was a partner in the Frederick and Nelson department store chain. As of November 2007, Sarkowsky operates a private investment firm. He is a Lifetime Board Member of the National Association of Home Builders, was a director of HLTH Corporation, and since its merger with WebMD sits on the board of that company (as of 2014).

=== Portland Trail Blazers ===
In 1970, an investment group consisting of Sarkowsky, Larry Weinberg of Beverly Hills, California, and Robert Schmertz of Lakewood, New Jersey paid US$3.7 million and was awarded an expansion NBA franchise in the city of Portland, Oregon. This team, soon to be named the Portland Trail Blazers, started play in November 1970. Sarkowsky was named president and managing partner of the team. His stake increased two years later when he bought out Schmertz, when the latter purchased the Boston Celtics. He reduced his stake in the team the next year, and sold the remainder of his stake in the Trail Blazers to Weinberg, who became managing partner in 1975.

=== Seattle Seahawks ===
At the same time that Sarkowsky was owner of the Trail Blazers, he was also attempting to establish a football team in his adopted hometown of Seattle. In 1972, he and Ned Skinner formed an organization called Seattle Professional Football, which was created to bring an NFL franchise to the city. A franchise was awarded to the city in June 1974. After the NFL made known its ownership terms (any ownership group must include one entity with controlling interest in the team), Sarkowsky entered into a partnership with the Nordstrom family in which the Nordstroms would have a 51% stake, with Sarkowsky holding the remaining 49%. The NFL granted the Nordstrom/Sarkwosky consortium ownership of the new Seattle franchise, which would be christened the Seahawks, in December of that year. The Seahawks began play in 1976. Sarkowsky would sell his stake in the team in 1988.

== Thoroughbred horse racing ==
Herman Sarkowsky bred and raced Thoroughbred horses. He got started in the sport in 1960 when he purchased a US$2000 claimer. He would later be an investor in Northwest Racing Associates, which would construct Emerald Downs, a racetrack in Auburn, Washington. Several horses he owned would have success in the Breeders' Cup, including Phone Chatter, which won the 1993 Breeders' Cup Juvenile Fillies, and Mr. Greeley, which placed in the 1995 Sprint. As of November 2007, Sarkowsky owned 37 thoroughbreds, including 11 mares.

== Philanthropy ==
Sarkowsky contributed to several philanthropic causes. He was a generous donor to the University of Washington, his alma mater, and sat on the board of the UW School of Medicine. He also served as a director of numerous charitable and cultural institutions, including the Seattle Foundation, the United Way, Seattle Repertory Theatre, the Seattle Symphony, and the Seattle Art Museum.

== Personal life and death ==
In 1951, Sarkowksky was married to Faye Mondschein; they had two children: Cathy Sarkowsky and Steve Sarkowsky. He died in November 2014 in Seattle at the age of 89.

Sporting positions
New creation	Seattle Seahawks owner 1976–1988	Succeeded by Ken Behring
New creation	Portland Trail Blazers owner 1970–1975	Succeeded by Larry Weinberg
