= Flo Ware Park =

Park in Seattle, Washington, U.S.

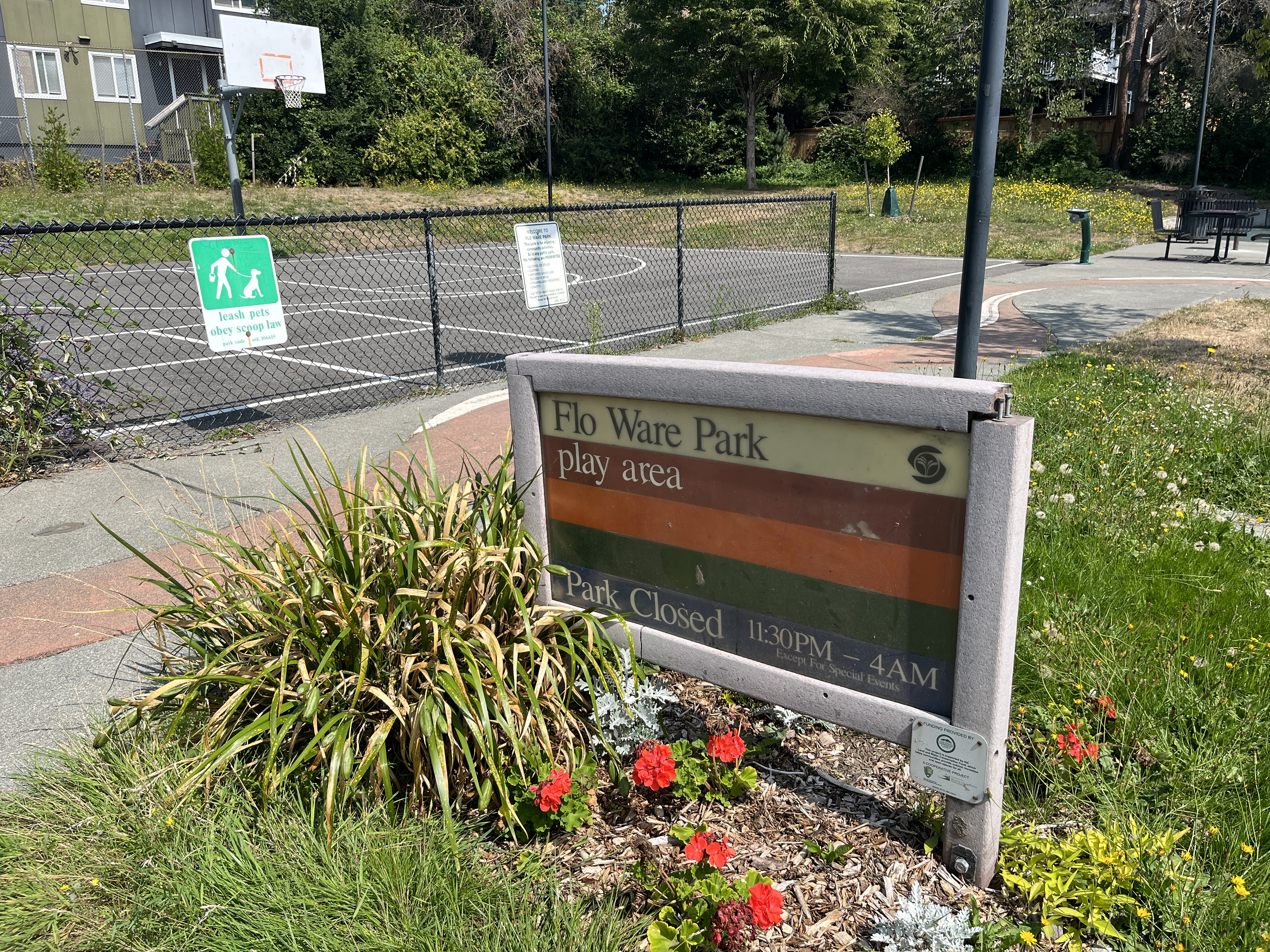
- Park sign, 2024
- Interactive map of Flo Ware Park
- Location: Seattle, Washington, U.S.
- Coordinates: 47.5994°N 122.2959°W
- Operator: Seattle Parks and Recreation

Flo Ware Park is a public park in Seattles Central District / Leschi neighborhoods, in the U.S. state of Washington. It was named for Flo Ware in 1982.

== Description and history ==
The 21,600-square-foot park is located at the southeast corner of 28th Avenue South and South Jackson Street. The city purchased the land for $46,000 in 1969, and the park was named after the African-American community activist Flo Ware in 1982.

The park has a playground, a half basketball court, benches, and a lawn. The entrance has a sculpture inspired by Ware with the phrases "build community" and "get involved". Among murals at the park is Find Yourself Outside, which depicts "Black people in a Pacific Northwest landscape swimming, paddleboarding, dancing, camping, and exploring the urban outdoors", according to the South Seattle Emerald.

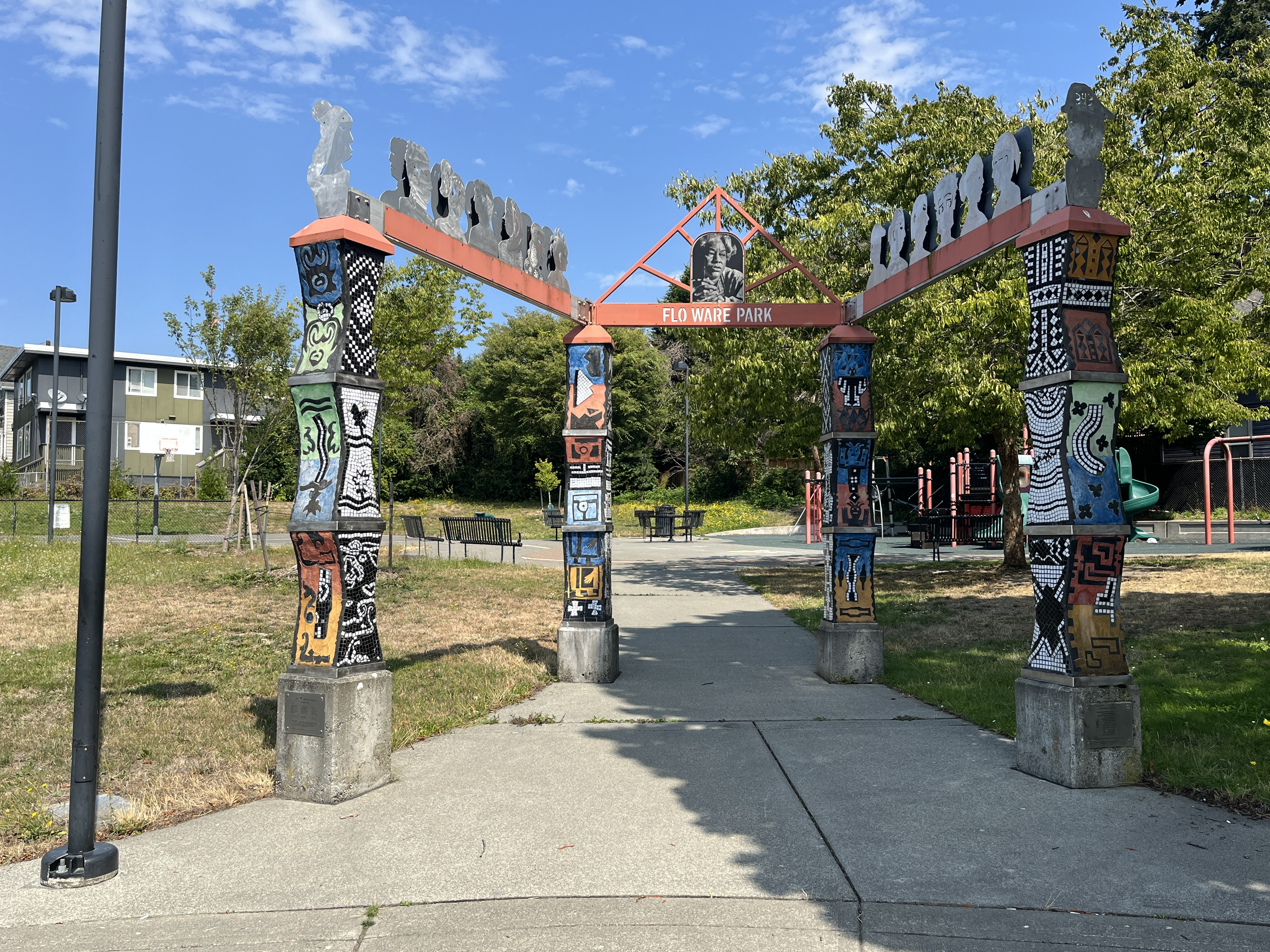
Sculpture at entrance

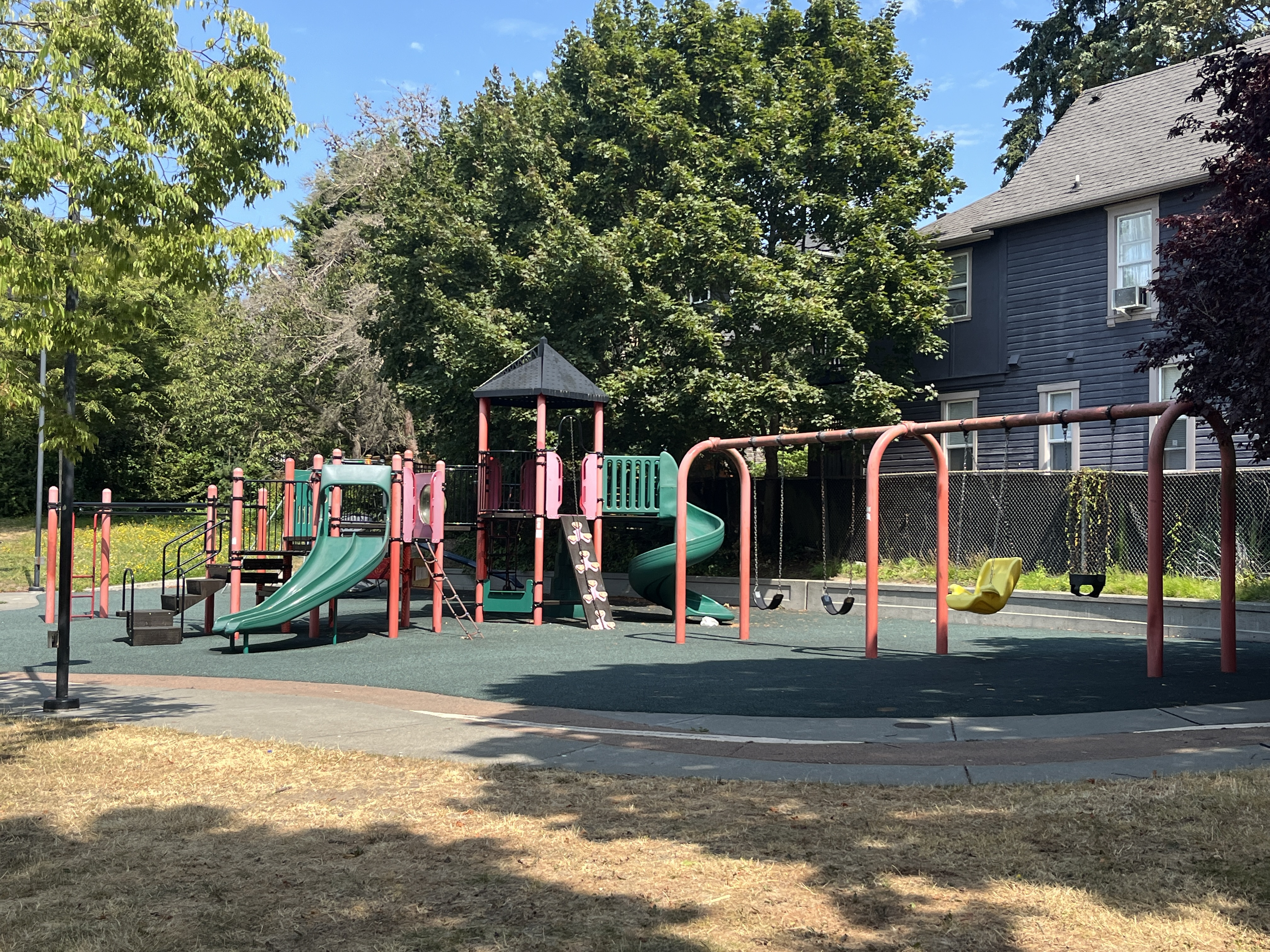
Playground

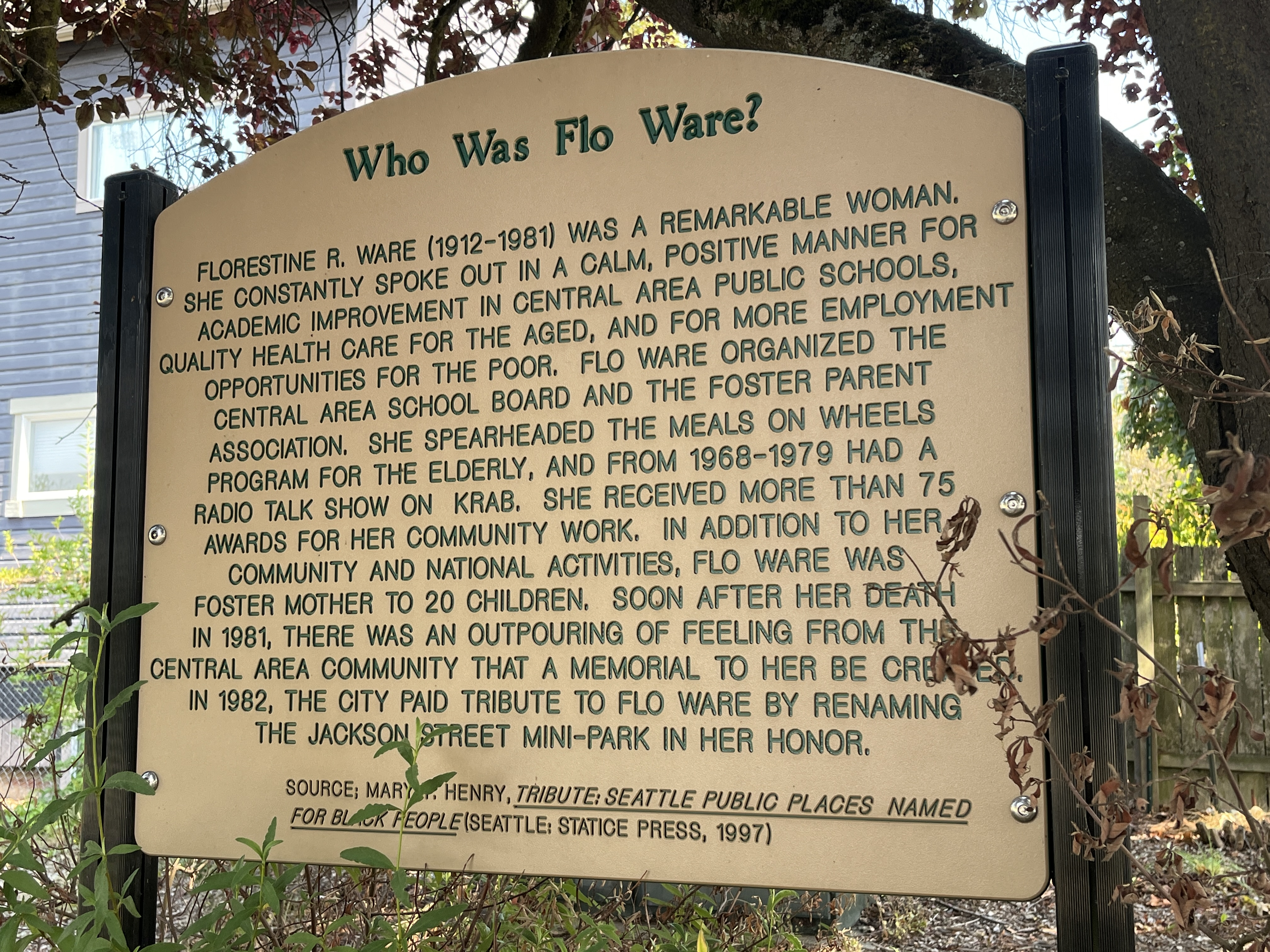
Sign about Flo Ware
