= Symphony station (Sound Transit) =

Light rail station in Seattle, Washington

51 Symphony
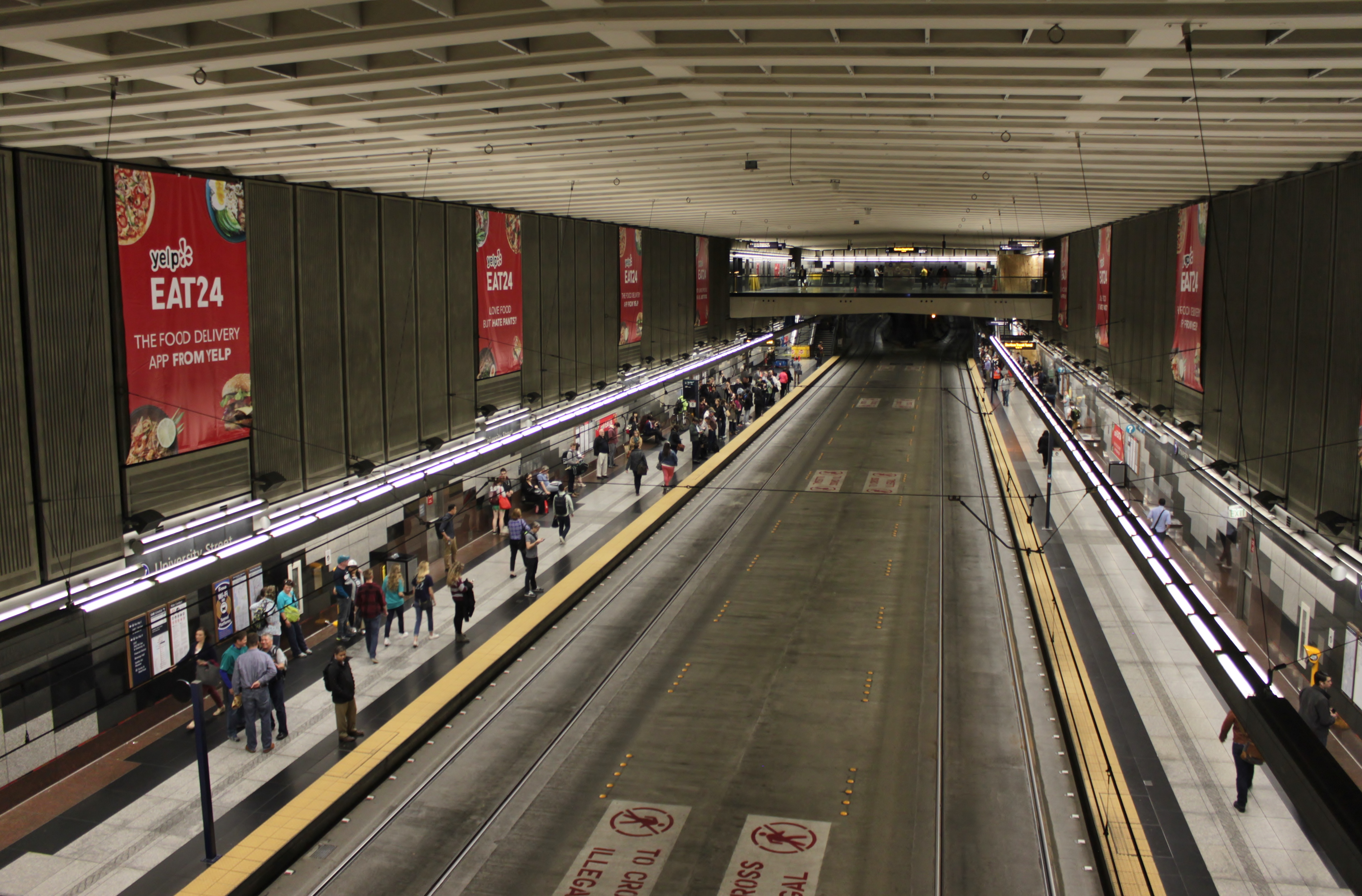
- Symphony station's platform level, viewed from one of the two mezzanines

General information
- Location: 3rd Avenue & University Street; Seattle, Washington; United States
- Coordinates: 47°36′28″N 122°20′10″W
- System: Link light rail
- Owner: Sound Transit
- Platforms: 2 side platforms
- Tracks: 2
- Connections: King County Metro, Sound Transit Express

Construction
- Structure type: Underground
- Parking: Pay parking nearby
- Accessible: Yes

History
- Opened: September 15, 1990
- Rebuilt: 2005–2007
- Former names: University Street (1990–2024)

Passengers
- 5,261 daily weekday boardings (2025); 1,658,910 total boardings (2025)

Services
Preceding station	Sound Transit	Following station
Link
Westlake toward Lynnwood City Center	1 Line	Pioneer Square toward Federal Way Downtown
Westlake toward Lynnwood City Center	2 Line	Pioneer Square toward Downtown Redmond
Former service
Preceding station	Sound Transit	Following station
ST Express
Westlake toward Convention Place	Route 550 DSTT (1999–2019)	Pioneer Square toward Bellevue Transit Center
Location

Symphony station, formerly University Street station, is a light rail station that is part of the Downtown Seattle Transit Tunnel in Seattle, Washington, United States. The station is located under 3rd Avenue at University Street, near Benaroya Hall. It is served by Sound Transit's 1 Line and 2 Line, which continue to the adjacent Westlake and Pioneer Square stations. Symphony station also has surface connections to buses operated by King County Metro and other agencies.

The station consists of two side platforms situated under street level, with two mezzanines connecting to the surface. It was designed in the style of high-tech architecture and includes several pieces of public art added during construction and later additions. Trains serve the station twenty hours a day on most days and the headway between light rail trains is six minutes during peak periods, with less frequent service at other times.

The transit tunnel opened on September 15, 1990, and was used exclusively by buses until 2009. Along with all other stations in the transit tunnel, University Street station was closed from 2005 to 2007 for a major renovation to accommodate light rail. Link light rail service to the station began on July 18, 2009, and bus service ceased on March 23, 2019. It was renamed to Symphony station on August 30, 2024, to prevent confusion with other stations that serve the University of Washington.

== Location ==
Symphony station is located under 3rd Avenue between Union and Seneca streets in Downtown Seattle; the area is part of the Metropolitan Tract, an area of downtown that is owned by, and was originally home to, the University of Washington. The area surrounding the station primarily consists of high-rise office buildings and some mixed-use development, providing 102,194 jobs and housing a population of 13,813 within a 1/2 mile (0.8 km) of 3rd Avenue and University Street. Major buildings in the immediate vicinity of Symphony station include Benaroya Hall and 1201 Third Avenue (formerly Washington Mutual Tower) on the west side of the station and the historic Seattle Tower and Cobb Building on the east side. The Seattle Art Museum and the Harbor Steps are located two blocks west of the station at the intersection near 1st Avenue, above the Seattle Waterfront and Seattle Aquarium. The 5th Avenue Theatre, Seattle Central Library, and Union Square are all located east of the station along 5th Avenue.

== History ==
=== Early proposals ===
The Metropolitan Tract, historically the northern boundary of downtown Seattle during its early decades, was offered for development shortly after the University of Washington moved its campus to the north side of Portage Bay (modern day University District) in 1895. The university's Board of Regents voted to lease the land to private developers in 1902, beginning a construction boom in the area under the direction of the Metropolitan Building Company. In 1911, Virgil Bogue presented a comprehensive plan for the city of Seattle, including a rapid transit system centered around a "trunk" subway under 3rd Avenue, passing through Downtown and the Metropolitan Tract, towards a new civic center in modern-day Belltown. The plan was rejected by voters on March 5, 1912, and the 3rd Avenue subway was unsuccessfully proposed twice in the 1920s.

In the late 1960s, the Forward Thrust Committee put forward a ballot measure to fund a rapid transit system in the Seattle metropolitan area, including a downtown subway under 3rd Avenue with a station between Seneca and Spring streets. The ballot measure, requiring a supermajority to support bonding to augment $385 million in local funding with $765 million from the Urban Mass Transportation Administration, failed to reach the 60 percent threshold in 1968 and again during a second vote in 1970. The failure of the Forward Thrust ballot measures led to the creation of Metro Transit in 1972, operating bus service across King County.

=== Bus tunnel ===
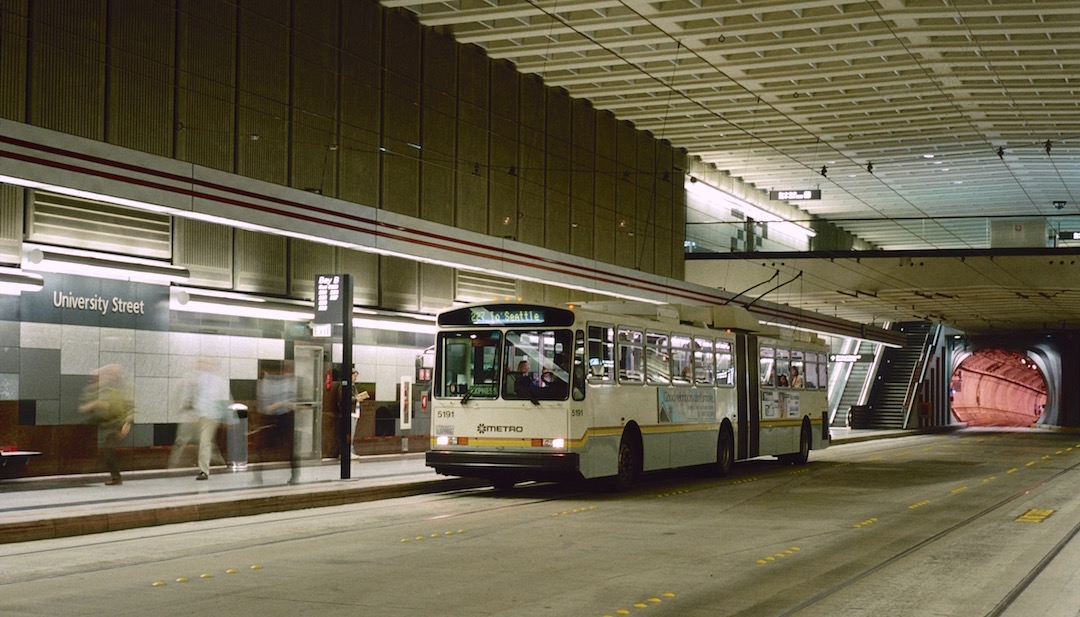
A dual-mode bus stopped on the northbound platform at University Street station in 1994

Metro Transit began planning a bus tunnel through downtown Seattle in the 1970s, to be eventually converted to use by light rail trains. Metro approved the construction of a bus tunnel under 3rd Avenue in 1983, and chose the intersection of 3rd Avenue and University Street as the site of one of the tunnel's five stations. The station at University Street, replacing two separate stations at Union and Madison streets, would be excavated cut-and-cover and be completed by late 1989.

Excavation of the downtown bus tunnel began in early 1987, and construction reached the University Street area later that year. The twin tunnel boring machines used to excavate the tunnel reached University Street in October 1987, and continued north towards Westlake station. In December, Metro agreed to pay $2.4 million to real estate developer Marathon Company for use of a city block they owned adjacent to the station for equipment staging and storage, delaying the planned construction of office buildings on the site. During excavation and construction of the University Street tunnel station, cracks and minor settling were found in the historic Seattle Tower, located nearby. The ground around the tower was later stabilized to prevent additional settlement, and was renovated with private funding in 1990.

In March 1989, the first buses were tested in the tunnel; University Street station was only 75 percent complete, and buses had to drive under scaffolding and construction equipment while passing through the station. Tunnel construction was completed in June 1990, and a soft opening for University Street station was held on August 9, 1990. Bus service in the Downtown Seattle Transit Tunnel began on September 15, 1990, with several Metro bus routes moved into the tunnel from surface streets. All service on routes using the tunnel was operated by dual-mode buses, which operated as diesel buses outside the tunnel and electrically, as trolleybuses, when inside the tunnel. During its early months, University Street and other stations were affected by serious water leaks, which splashed water onto walkways during the tunnel's first winter in operation. The leaks were later fixed by Metro contractors.

In 1994, the Seattle Symphony selected a city block adjacent to University Street station, used during tunnel construction for equipment staging and storage, as the site of their new concert hall. The building, later named Benaroya Hall, required the two-year closure of the station's 2nd Avenue entrance beginning in 1996. The entrance was re-opened in 1998, at the same time the new hall was inaugurated.

=== Light rail ===
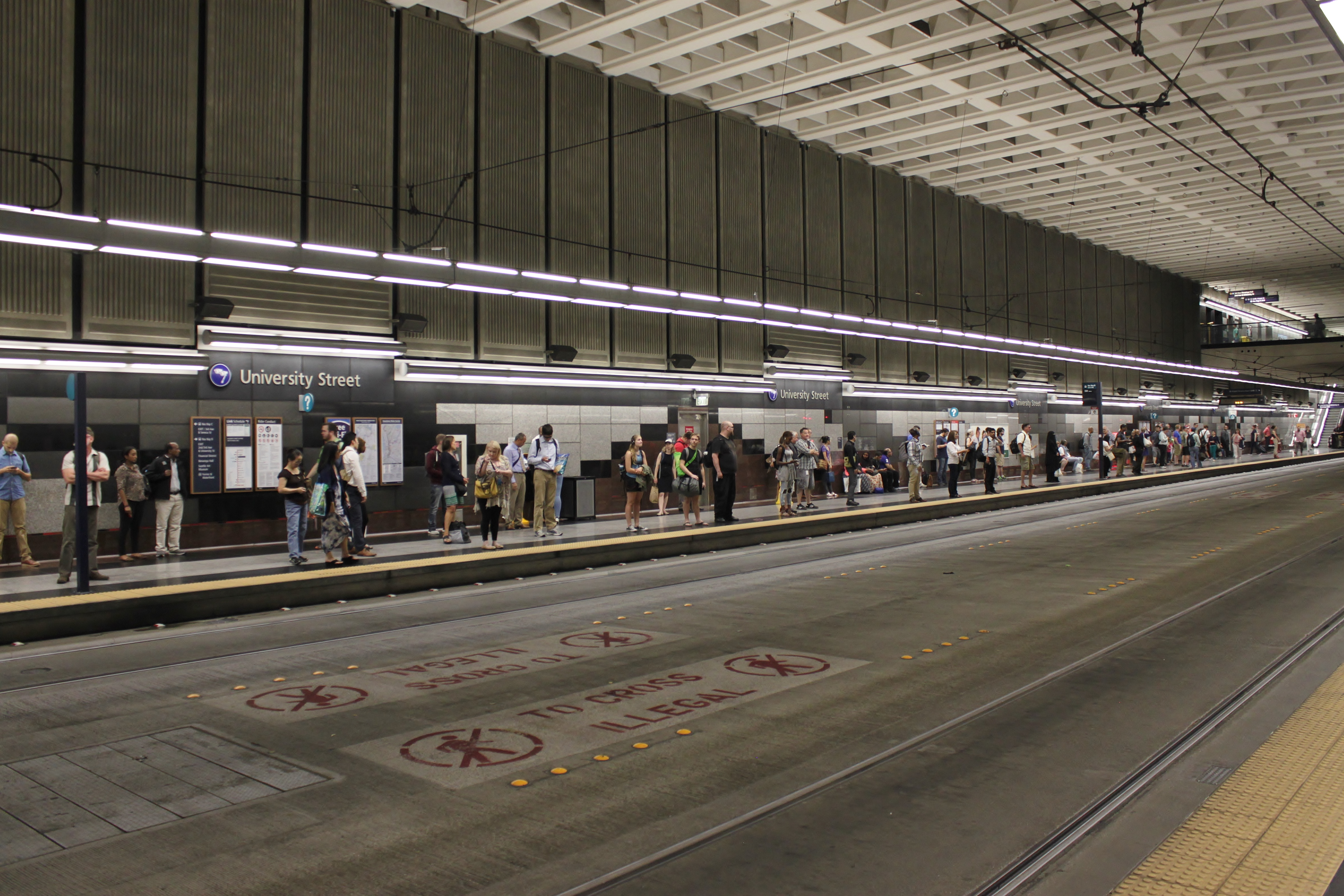
The platform at University Street station, after its renovation for light rail

In the early 1990s, a regional transit authority (RTA) was formed to plan and construct a light rail system for the Seattle area. After an unsuccessful attempt in 1995, regional voters passed a $3.9 billion plan to build light rail under the RTA in 1996. The downtown transit tunnel had already been planned for eventual light rail use and was built with tracks that would be incorporated into the initial system. The RTA, later renamed Sound Transit, approved the tunnel as part of the route of its initial light rail line in 1999. Ownership of the tunnel, including its stations, was transferred to Sound Transit in 2000 but returned two years later to King County Metro under a joint-operations agreement.

The downtown transit tunnel closed on September 23, 2005, for a two-year, $82.7 million renovation to accommodate light rail vehicles. The renovation included the installation of new rails, a lowered roadbed at stations for level boarding, new signalling systems and emergency ventilation. The tunnel reopened on September 24, 2007, and Link light rail service began on July 18, 2009, from Westlake station to Tukwila International Boulevard station.

Bus service within the downtown transit tunnel ended on March 23, 2019, due to the expansion of the Washington State Convention Center at the site of Convention Place station, which includes demolition of the north portal. The tunnel became exclusively served by light rail trains, while the remaining seven bus routes were relocated to surface streets and nearby bus stops on 2nd, 3rd, 4th, and 5th avenues. Ownership of the tunnel and University Street station was transferred to Sound Transit in 2022. The 2 Line entered simulated service on February 14, 2026, with passengers able to board trains from Lynnwood to International District/Chinatown station.

=== Naming ===
University Street station was named after University Street, itself named for the original campus of the University of Washington before it moved in 1895. Metro discussed renaming the station for the Seattle Art Museum after it moved to the area in 1991, but took no action.

In 2012, Sound Transit adopted names for light rail stations in the University District, near the current University of Washington campus, including "University of Washington" and "U District" stations. The similarity between the three stations' names has led to public confusion and the implementation of an on-board announcement to indicate that University Street was not on the university campus. Proposals to rename University Street station after Benaroya Hall or the Seattle Symphony were considered in the 2010s. In September 2019, Sound Transit opened an online survey with six options to replace the University Street name—Seneca Street, Midtown, Arts District, Downtown Arts District, Symphony, and Benaroya Hall.

The Sound Transit Board adopted "Union Street/Symphony" as the station's new name in January 2020, after it had been recommended by a committee despite Union Street having no entrances to the station. The name was suggested as a cost-saving measure to match the existing acronym of the station (USS) in internal documents and software, which would cut the cost of changing the station's name from $5.3 million to $1 million. The name change was planned to take effect with the opening of the Northgate Link Extension, but the Sound Transit Board rescinded its decision a month later. A separate board action to rename the station to "Symphony Station" was passed in October 2021 and scheduled to be implemented before the 2 Line's original planned opening date in 2024. The name change took effect on August 30, 2024, the opening day of the Lynnwood Link Extension, which opened sooner than the 2 Line's connection to Seattle.

== Station layout ==
Symphony station was designed in a high-tech motif to complement the modernist architecture found among the 1980s-era office buildings in the adjacent Financial District; architectural elements were used to create the desired atmosphere in the station, including linear stainless steel light fixtures over the platforms, glass railings on the mezzanines, and colorful granite to highlight platform benches and information signs. The station has two side platforms located below two mezzanines at the north and south ends of the station box: the north mezzanine is accessible through the parking garage of the Cobb Building at 3rd Avenue and University Street (Exit A1), an elevator in the lobby of Benaroya Hall (Exit A2), as well as a level walkway under Benaroya Hall to 2nd Avenue and University Street (Exit B); the south mezzanine is accessible from a single entrance located inside the 1201 Third Avenue building near 3rd Avenue and Seneca Street (Exit C). Symphony station is approximately 570 feet (170 m) long, 70 feet (21 m) wide, and 60 to 70 feet (18 to 21 m) deep.

The station is situated above the Great Northern Tunnel, a century-old rail tunnel, which passes under with a clearance of approximately 15 feet (4.6 m). Both tunnels factored into the architecture of nearby Benaroya Hall, which has an auditorium that rests on 310 rubber bearings to insulate from vibrations. A 6-foot-thick (1.8 m) concrete slab with 9 inches (23 cm) of separation from the structures was also placed to minimize sound transfers.

=== Art ===
Symphony station, like other stations in the downtown transit tunnel, is furnished with several pieces of public art integrated into its design by architect Mark Spitzer and lead artist Vicki Scuri.

"The Beltline", designed by Scuri, runs along the platform and consists of colored granite arranged in patterns that highlight passenger amenities, including information panels and benches. The benches have computer-generated dot matrix patterns sandblasted into the seats. Some of the granite originally purchased for use in "The Beltline" originated in South Africa, then under a Metro-sanctioned boycott over its Apartheid policies; the discovery fueled a minor scandal that resulted in the resignation of Metro's executive director, while the granite would be replaced with another type.

At the south mezzanine is Robert Teeple's "The Southern Lights", a series of fourteen LED screens that show animated symbols and phrases in a commentary on the increasing influence of computers in human life. The symbols range from human faces to animals and astrological signs; the phrases, displayed in both English and Spanish, are randomly generated from using sets of four words that allow for 1.2 million possible combinations. Teeple also refers to the piece, which spans 60 feet (18 m) in width, as "Electric Lascaux" in reference to the French cave where Paleolithic cave paintings were discovered in the 20th century. The north mezzanine has "The Northern Lights" by Bill Bell, a series of 24 embedded lights that form patterns when the eyes of viewers move rapidly from side to side. The patterns include images related to transportation and finance, including trolleys, airplanes, coins and the dollar sign.

Two of the station's entrances and stairways are home to the silhouettes of and sentence-long quotes from Abraham H. Albertson, architect of the nearby Seattle Tower, and humanitarian activist Flo Ware. At the corner of 3rd Avenue and University Street is a 14-foot-tall (4.3 m) pendulum clock known as "Hickory-Dickory Dock Clock", designed by Heather Ramsay with references to the nursery rhyme "Hickory Dickory Dock", including a brass mouse running up its side.

The Benaroya Hall entrance to Symphony station, built in 1998 for the new venue, is decorated with a series of art pieces by Erin Shie Palmer known collectively as the "Temple of Music". The walkway's walls are sandblasted with images that begin as an abstract musical score derived from Robert Fludd's "Temple of Music" and morph into pixellated patterns as it approaches the station mezzanine. The walkway's handrails are etched with Braille text and voiceprints, and end in sculpted depictions of a violin and a microphone.

University Street station's former pictogram, which depicts a pair of theater glasses

The station's former pictogram, a pair of theater glasses, represented the neighborhood's connections to the arts. It was created in 2009 by Christian French as part of the Stellar Connections series and its points represented nearby destinations, including Benaroya Hall, the Seattle Art Museum, the Central Library, and the 5th Avenue Theatre. The pictogram series was retired in 2024 and replaced by station numbers.

== Services ==
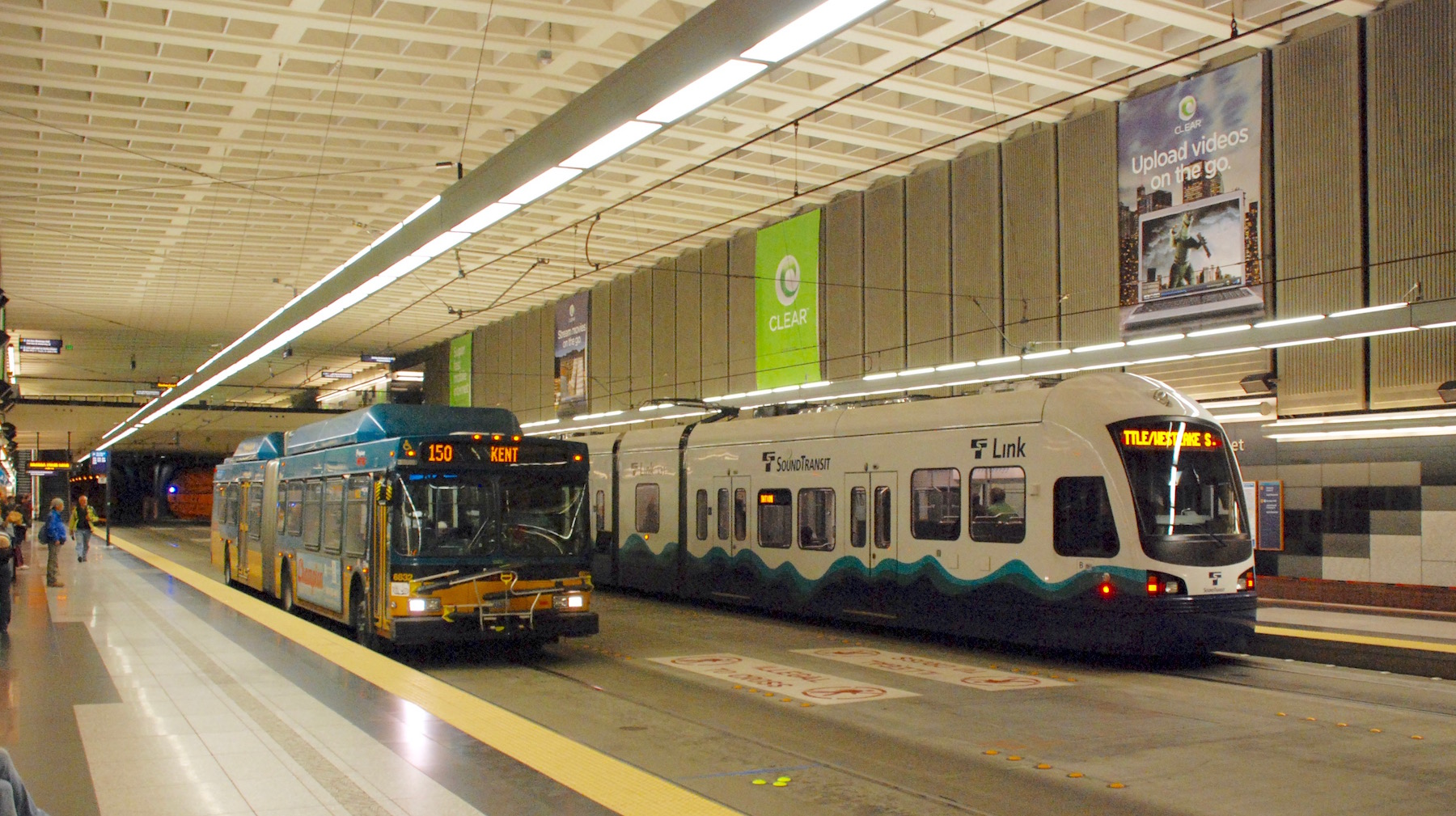
A King County Metro bus and Sound Transit Link light rail train at the station, seen in 2010

Symphony is one of four stations in the Downtown Seattle Transit Tunnel, which is served by the Link light rail system's 1 Line and 2 Line. It is situated between Westlake and Pioneer Square stations; it is the tenth southbound station from Lynnwood City Center, the terminus of both lines. Link light rail trains serve Symphony station 20 hours a day on weekdays and Saturdays, from 5:00 a.m. to 12:00 a.m.; and 18 hours on Sundays, from 6:00 a.m. to 12:00 a.m. During regular weekday service, trains on each line operate roughly every eight minutes during rush hour, ten minutes during midday operation, and twelve to fifteen minutes in the early morning and at night. On weekends, trains on each line arrive at Symphony station every ten minutes during midday hours and every twelve to fifteen minutes during mornings and evenings. The two lines combine for frequencies of four minutes during rush hour and five minutes during midday and weekend service. The station is approximately 33 minutes from Lynnwood City Center station, 25 minutes from Bellevue Downtown station, and 36 minutes from SeaTac/Airport station. In 2025, an average of 5,261 passengers boarded Link trains at Symphony station on weekdays.

In addition to light rail service, Symphony station is adjacent to four surface bus stops on 3rd Avenue near its entrances, served by several King County Metro routes and three RapidRide lines: the C Line to West Seattle and South Lake Union, the D Line to Ballard and the E Line on Aurora Avenue to Shoreline. The area is also served by east–west routes on Seneca and Spring streets that travel towards First Hill and the Central District. The RapidRide G Line stops on Spring and Madison streets and continues east through First Hill to Madison Valley. During light rail disruptions, King County Metro also runs a special route between light rail stations that stops on 3rd Avenue between University and Union streets to serve Symphony station.

From 2009 to 2019, several bus routes also ran in the tunnel alongside Link light rail. The final set of bus routes in the tunnel were divided into three bays by their outbound direction: Bay A was served by three routes heading north toward Northgate and the University District and east towards Kirkland (routes 41, 74, and 255); Bay C was served by three routes heading south through the SODO Busway toward Kent and Renton (routes 101, 102, and 150); and Bay D was served by one route heading east via Interstate 90 to Bellevue (Sound Transit Express route 550). The bus routes were relocated in March 2019 to new stops on 2nd, 3rd, and 4th avenues to serve the area around the station.
