= Seattle Justice Center =

Government office building and courthouse in Seattle, Washington, US

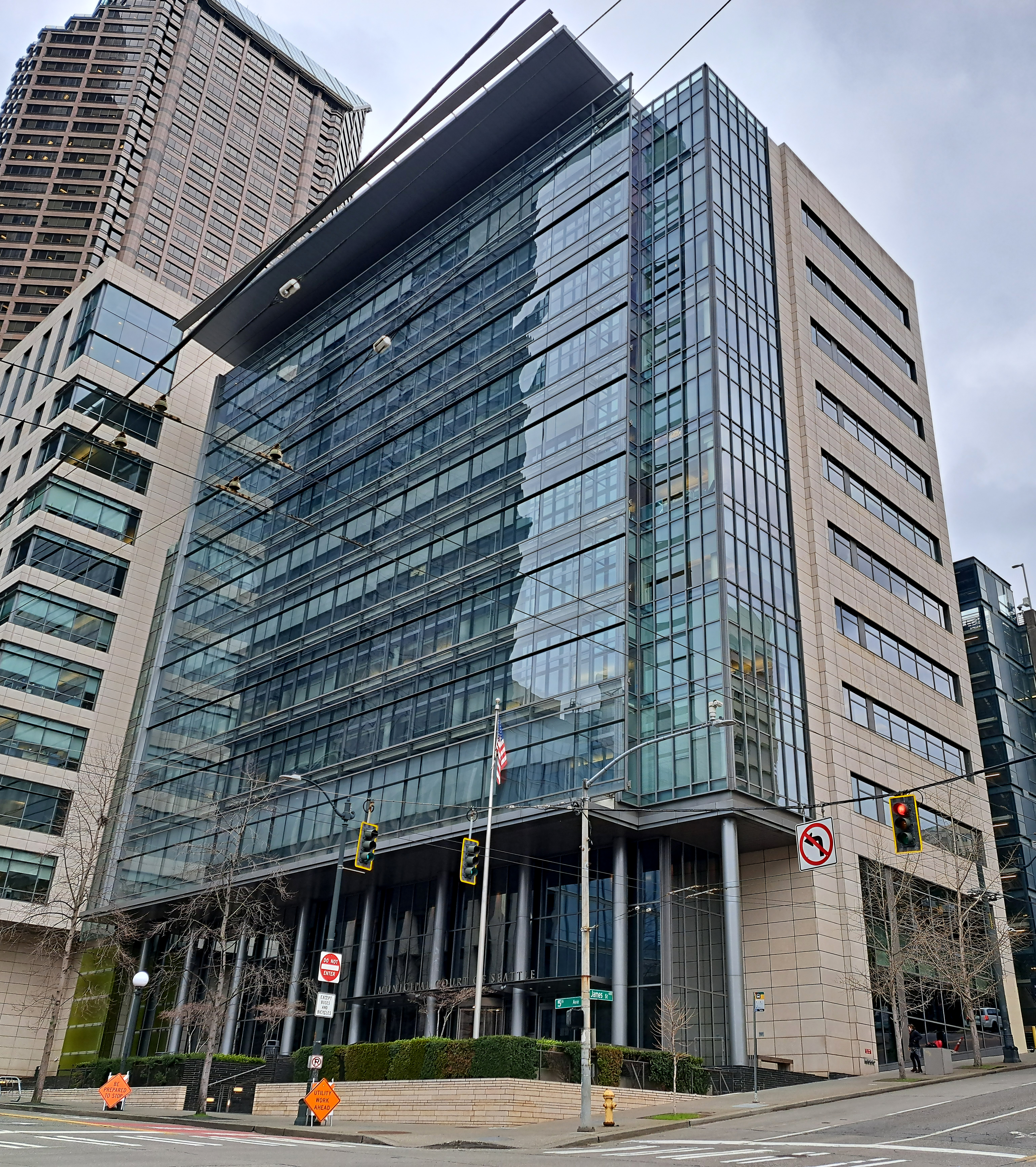
- Facade in 2025

- Location within downtown Seattle

General information
- Status: Completed
- Type: Office building
- Location: 600 5th Avenue; Seattle, Washington, U.S.
- Coordinates: 47°36′15″N 122°19′45″W
- Groundbreaking: July 19, 2000
- Completed: November 2002
- Cost: $92 million
- Owner: City of Seattle

Technical details
- Floor count: 13
- Floor area: 183,000 square feet (17,000 m^{2})

Design and construction
- Architecture firm: NBBJ
- Main contractor: Hoffman Construction

The Seattle Justice Center is a 13-story government office building in Seattle, Washington, United States. It is located at 600 5th Avenue in the city's civic center complex and houses the Municipal Court of Seattle and the headquarters of the Seattle Police Department. The building was completed in 2002 at a cost of approximately $92 million, taking two years to construct. NBBJ was the architect, and Hoffman Construction was the general contractor.

The Municipal Court occupies the lower three floors and floors eight through twelve, while the police department has offices in the rest of the building. It replaced the Public Safety Building, which was demolished in 2005. The facility was built to the city's green design standards, including a green roof, but as of 2010, "struggled to take hold, plagued to different degrees by weeds, a lack of summer irrigation, and the need for repeated replanting". Other environmentally friendly features include a façade providing ventilation to the building, and a water retention system.

The Justice Center is connected to the adjacent City Hall by an underground waterway, which forms an artificial waterfall in the western plaza.
