= Seattle City Hall =

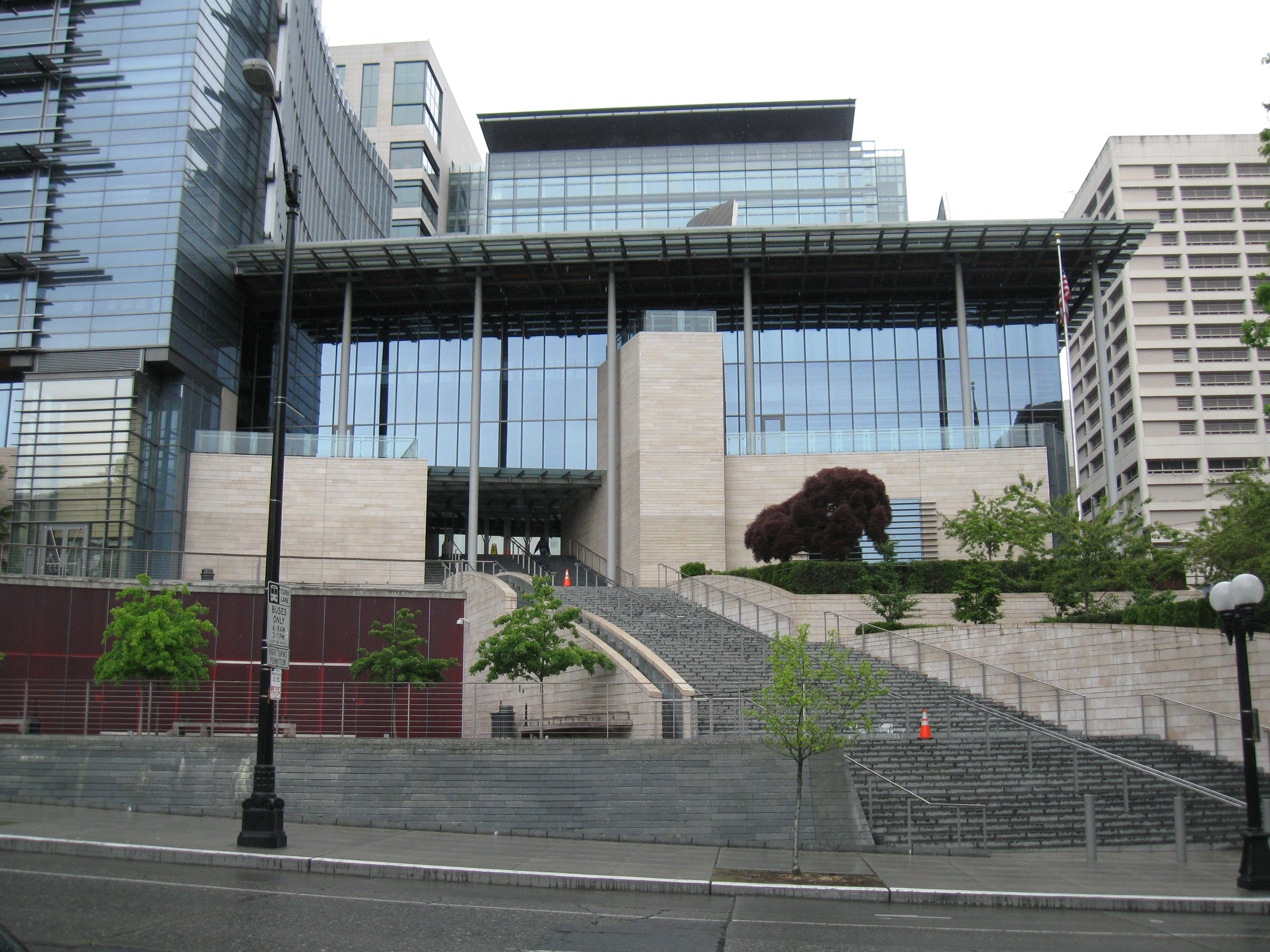
- Seattle City Hall in 2008
- Interactive map of City Hall location
- Alternative names: Seattle Municipal Building

General information
- Type: Government offices
- Location: 600 Fourth Avenue; Seattle Civic Center; Seattle, Washington, U.S.
- Coordinates: 47.60387802°N 122.33000097°W
- Construction started: 2003; 23 years ago
- Completed: 2005; 21 years ago
- Cost: US$73 million
- Owner: City of Seattle

Technical details
- Floor count: 7
- Floor area: 200,000 sq ft (19,000 m^{2})

Design and construction
- Architects: Bohlin Cywinski Jackson; Bassetti Architects; Gustafson Guthrie Nichol (landscape architect)
- Main contractor: Hoffman Construction Company

Seattle City Hall (also known as the Seattle Municipal Building) is the home of the offices of the mayor and city council of Seattle, Washington, located between 4th Avenue and 5th Avenue in the downtown area of the city. Most city departments have their offices in the nearby Seattle Municipal Tower. In 2003, the Seattle city government moved into a new, "green" city hall building. Until 1962, the city government operated from the King County Courthouse, alongside the King County government. The new City Hall and Plaza, together with the adjacent Seattle Municipal Tower, Seattle Justice Center, and (unbuilt) Civic Square, comprise the Seattle Civic Center.

== Awards ==
- 2005 U.S. Green Building Council: LEED-NC v2 Gold
- 2005 AIA Seattle: Commendation for Design
- 2006 AIA Washington Civic Design Awards: Honor Award
- 2006 American Institute of Steel Construction IDEAS Awards Program: Merit Award
- 2007 AIA Northwest & Pacific Region: Merit Award

== Gallery ==
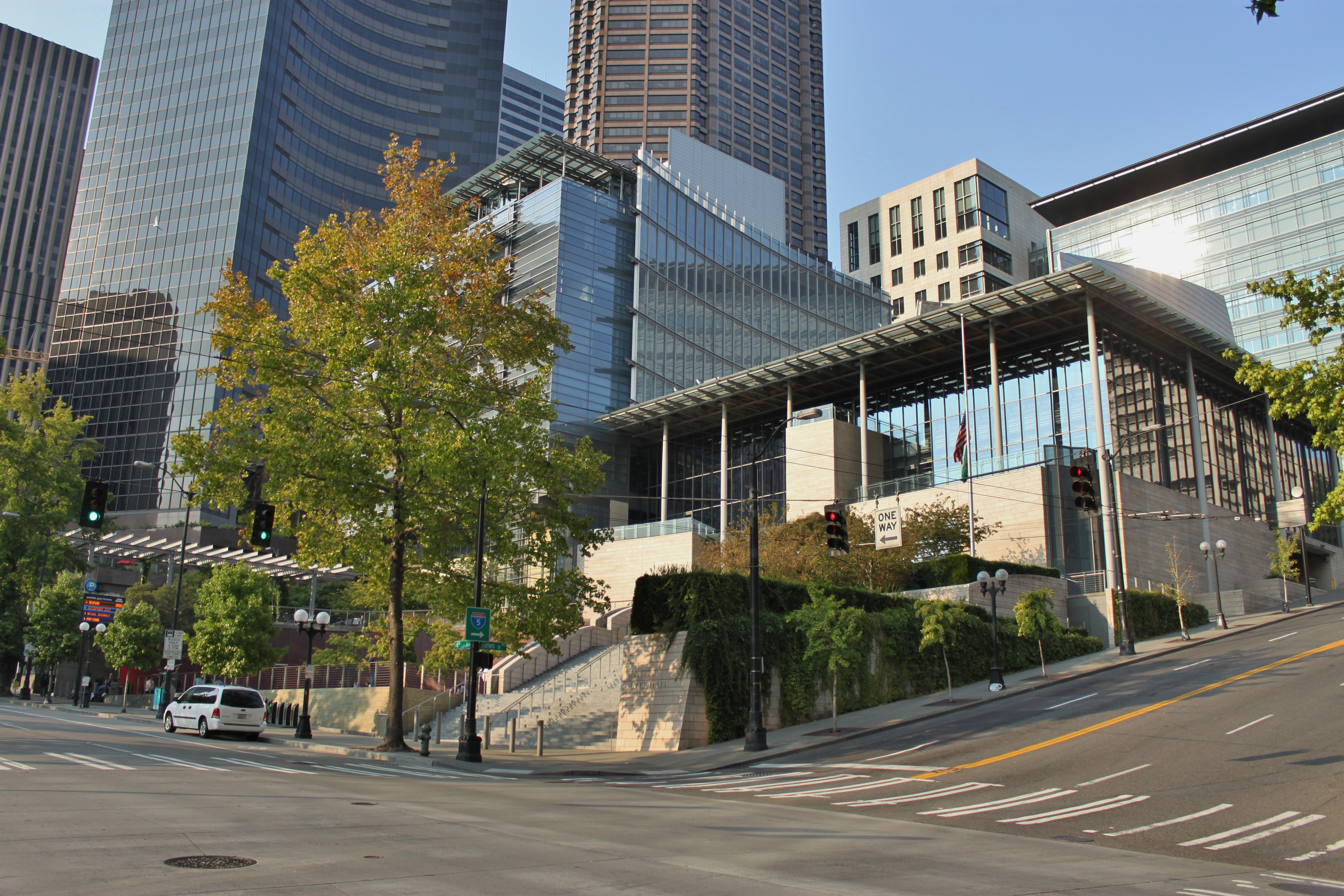
The building viewed from the southwest

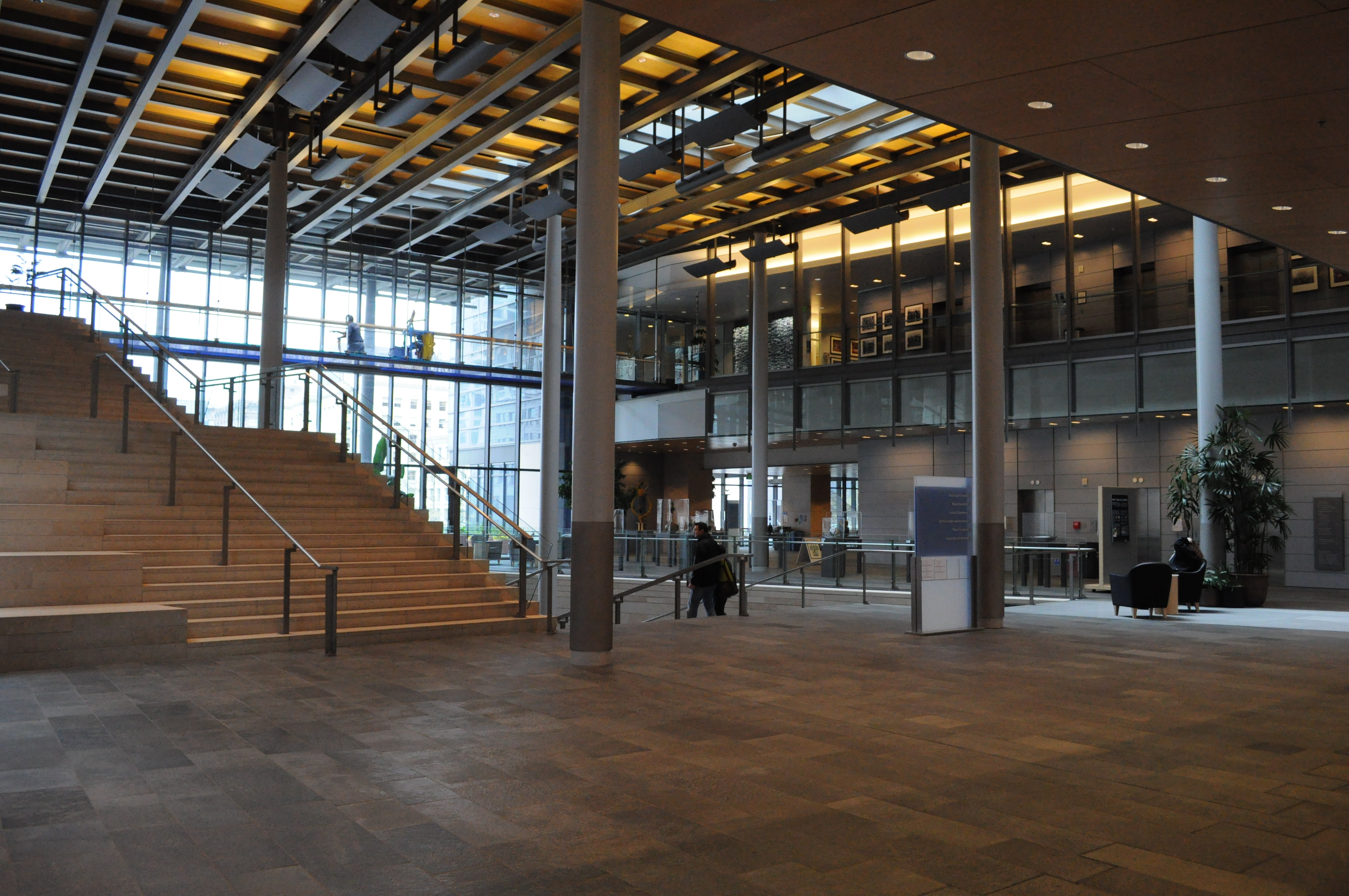
Interior of the lobby, with blue glass bridge against the upper windows

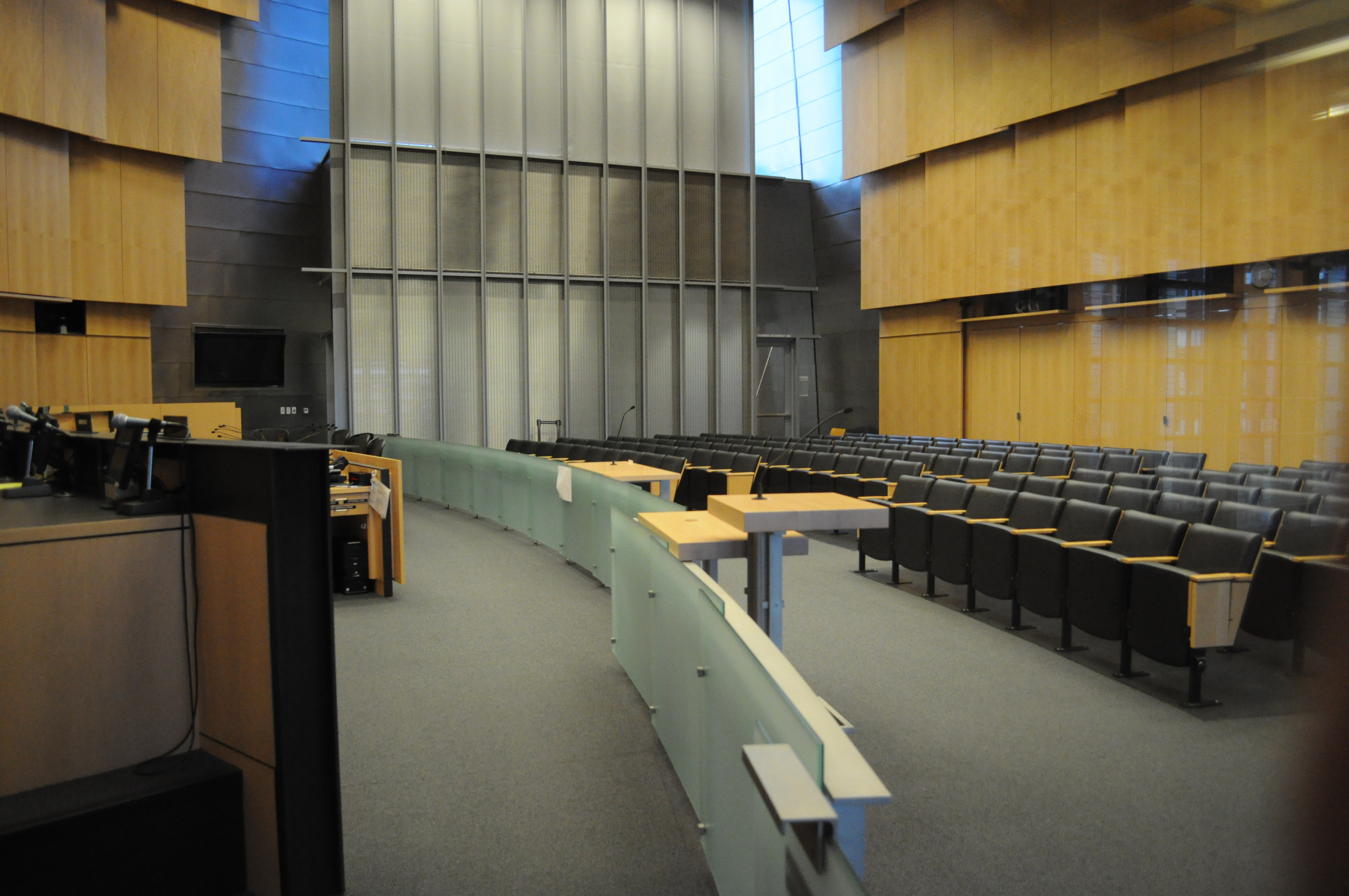
City Council Chambers

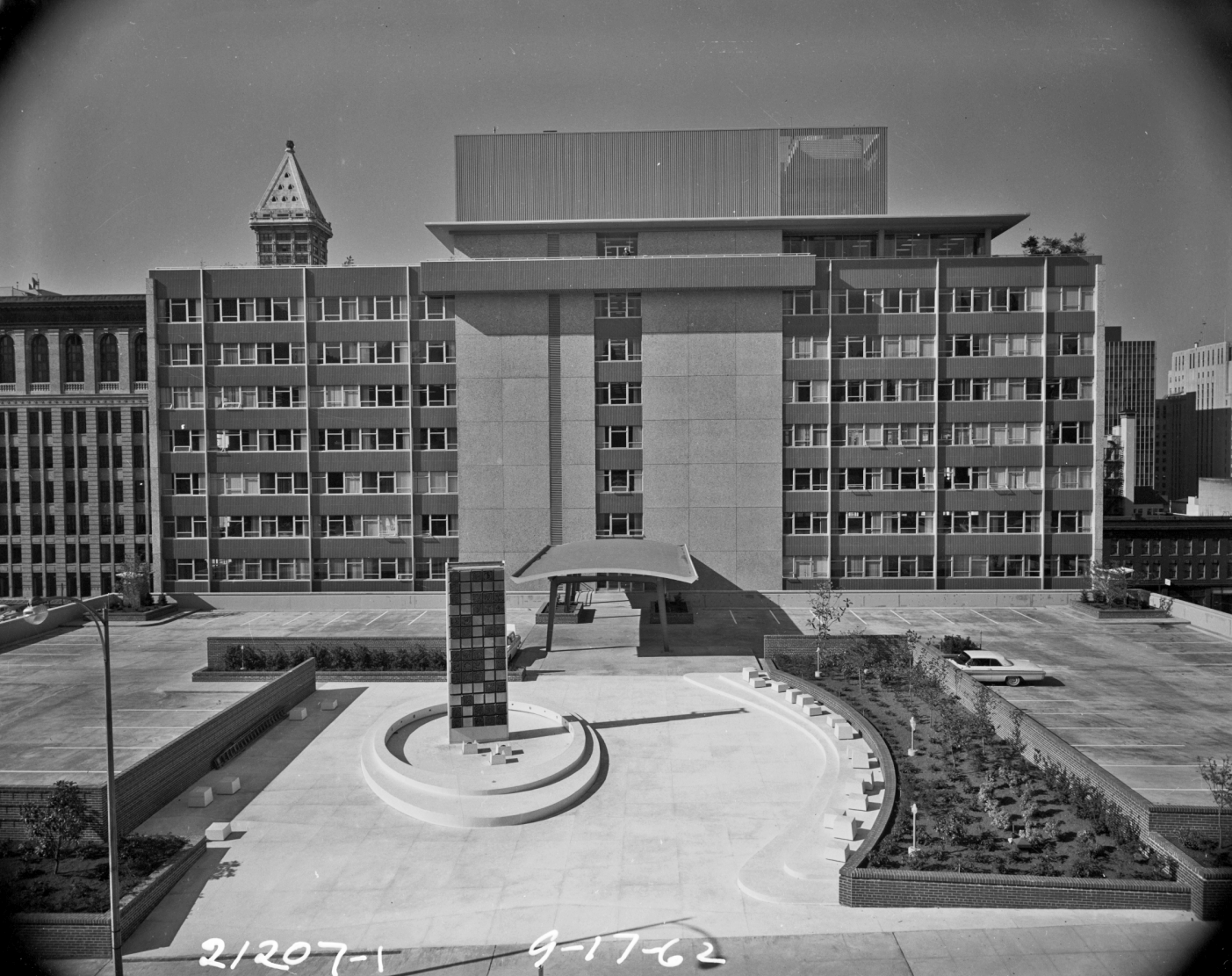
The former City Municipal Building, c. 1962

== See also ==
- Black Lives Matter street mural (Seattle City Hall)
