= William B. and Mary Chase Stratton House =

Historic house in Michigan, United States

- U.S. National Register of Historic Places
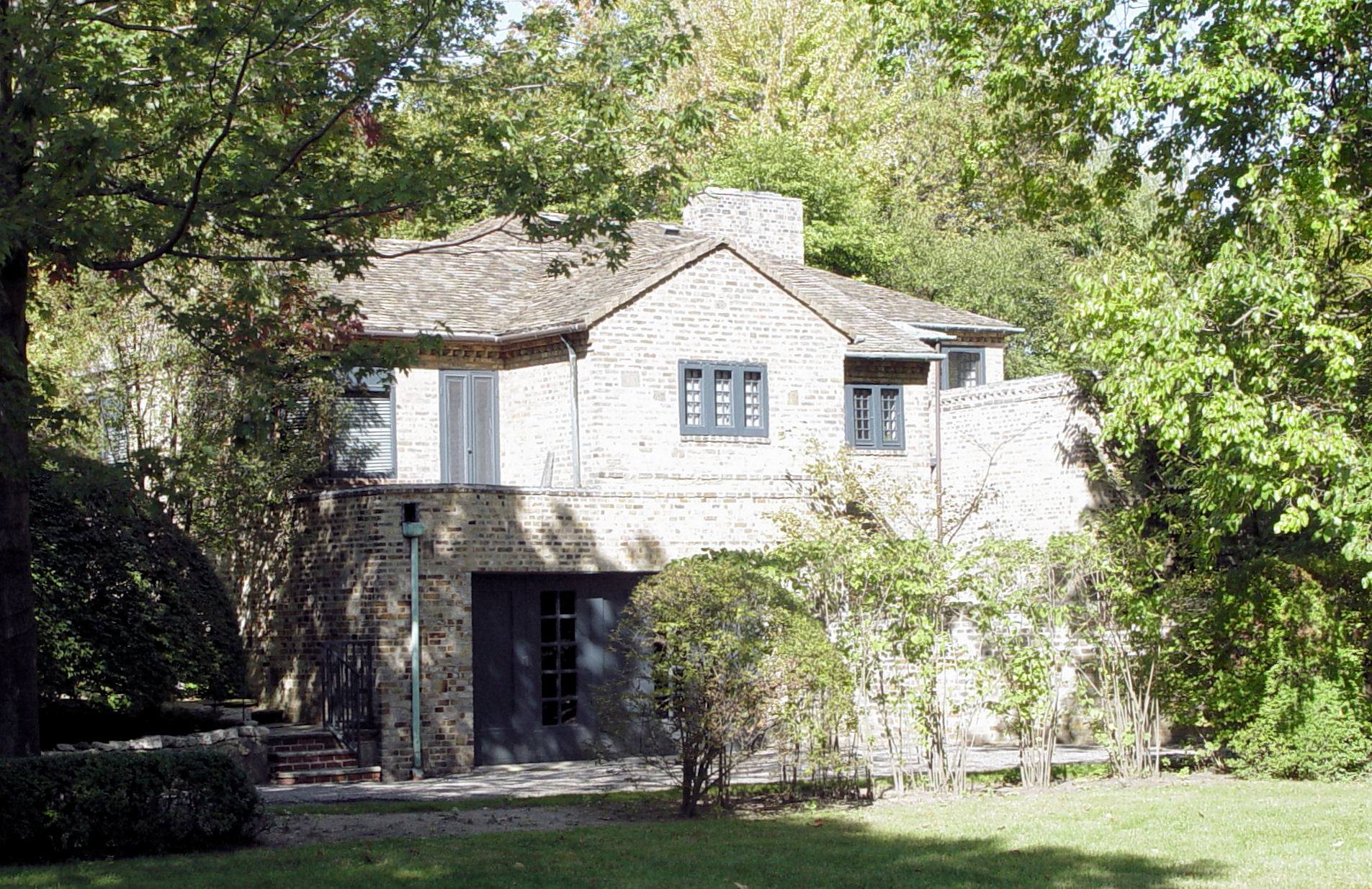
- Interactive map
- Location: 938 Three Mile Dr., Grosse Pointe Park, Michigan
- Coordinates: 42°22′43″N 82°55′24″W
- Built: 1927
- Architect: William Buck Stratton
- NRHP reference No.: 84001867
- Added to NRHP: May 24, 1984

The William B. and Mary Chase Stratton House is a private house located at 938 Three Mile Dr. in Grosse Pointe Park, Michigan. It was listed on the National Register of Historic Places in 1984.

== Description ==
The William B. and Mary Chase Stratton House was built as a collaborative venture between husband-and-wife William Buck Stratton (an architect) and Mary Chase Perry Stratton (a ceramicist). The two-story house is constructed of hollow tile with steel beams faced with varicolored brick shading from brown to beige. The house is irregularly massed and crowned with a low-pitched roof covered with unglazed tiles of Pewabic Pottery, produced by Mary Chase Perry Stratton's company which is a National Historic Landmark in Detroit.

The house design was heavily influenced by the Arts and Crafts Movement, and the Strattons used natural material, texture, and color to create an original and masterly composition. The interior of the house holds a simple elegance, and is notable for the fine composition and harmony both within the house and between the interior and the landscaped grounds.

== History ==
William Stratton began his planning for the house in 1912, six years before he married Mary Chase Perry in 1918. The home in Grosse Pointe was built in 1927.
