= Guardian Building =

Skyscraper in Detroit, Michigan, US

- U.S. National Register of Historic Places
- U.S. National Historic Landmark
- U.S. Historic district – Contributing property
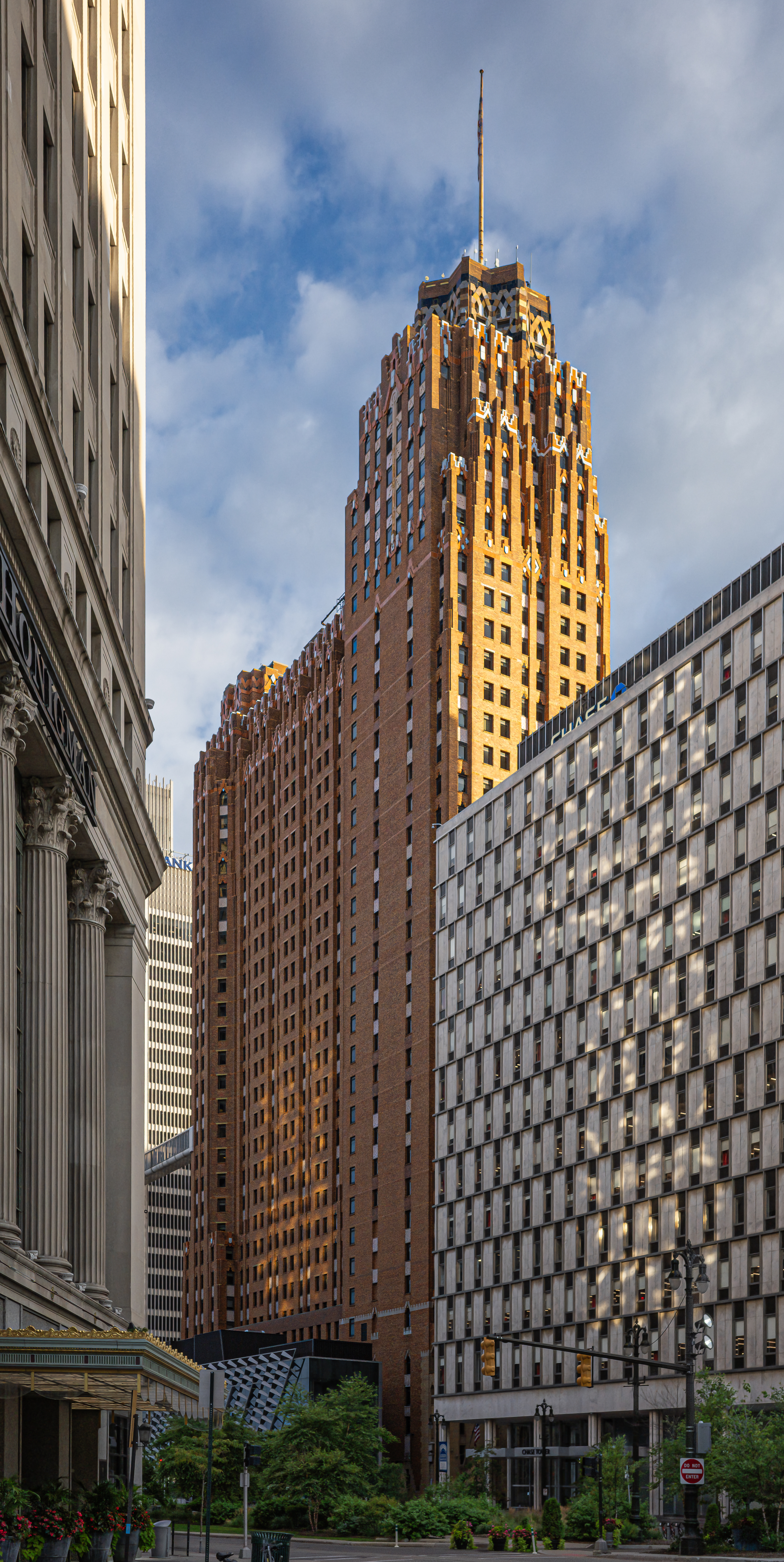

- Location within Michigan Location within the United States
- Interactive map showing the location of Guardian Building
- Location: 500 Griswold Street; Detroit, Michigan
- Coordinates: 42°19′47″N 83°2′45″W
- Built: 1929
- Architect: Wirt C. Rowland of Smith, Hinchman & Grylls
- Architectural style: Mayan Revival, Art Deco
- Part of: Detroit Financial District (ID09001067)
- NRHP reference No.: 89001165

Significant dates
- Added to NRHP: June 29, 1989
- Designated NHL: June 29, 1989

The Guardian Building is a 43-story office skyscraper in the Financial District of downtown Detroit, Michigan, United States. Built from 1928 to 1929, the building was originally called the Union Trust Building and is a bold example of Art Deco architecture, including art moderne designs. It was designated a National Historic Landmark in 1989, and is currently owned by Wayne County.

== Architecture ==
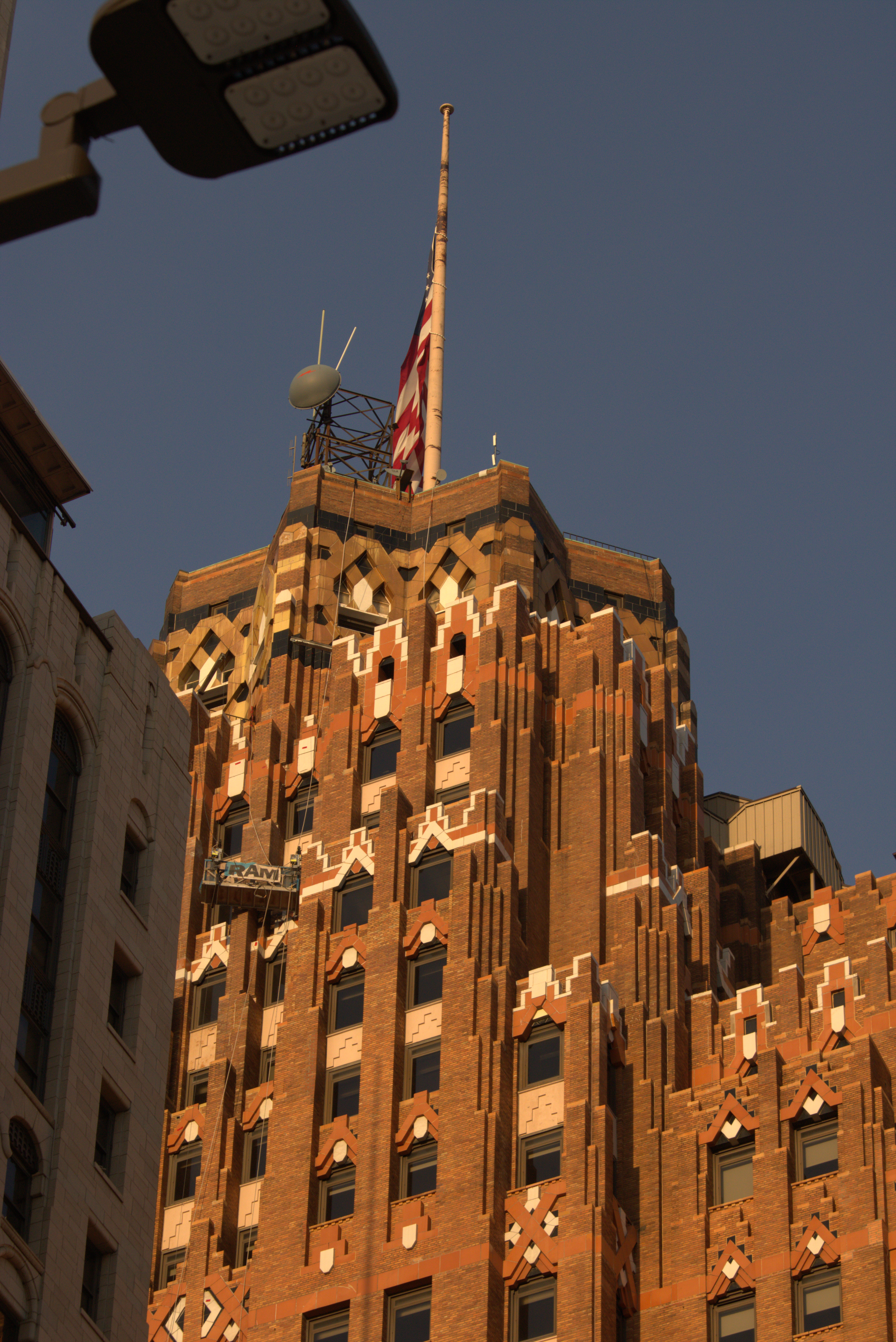
Tall Spire

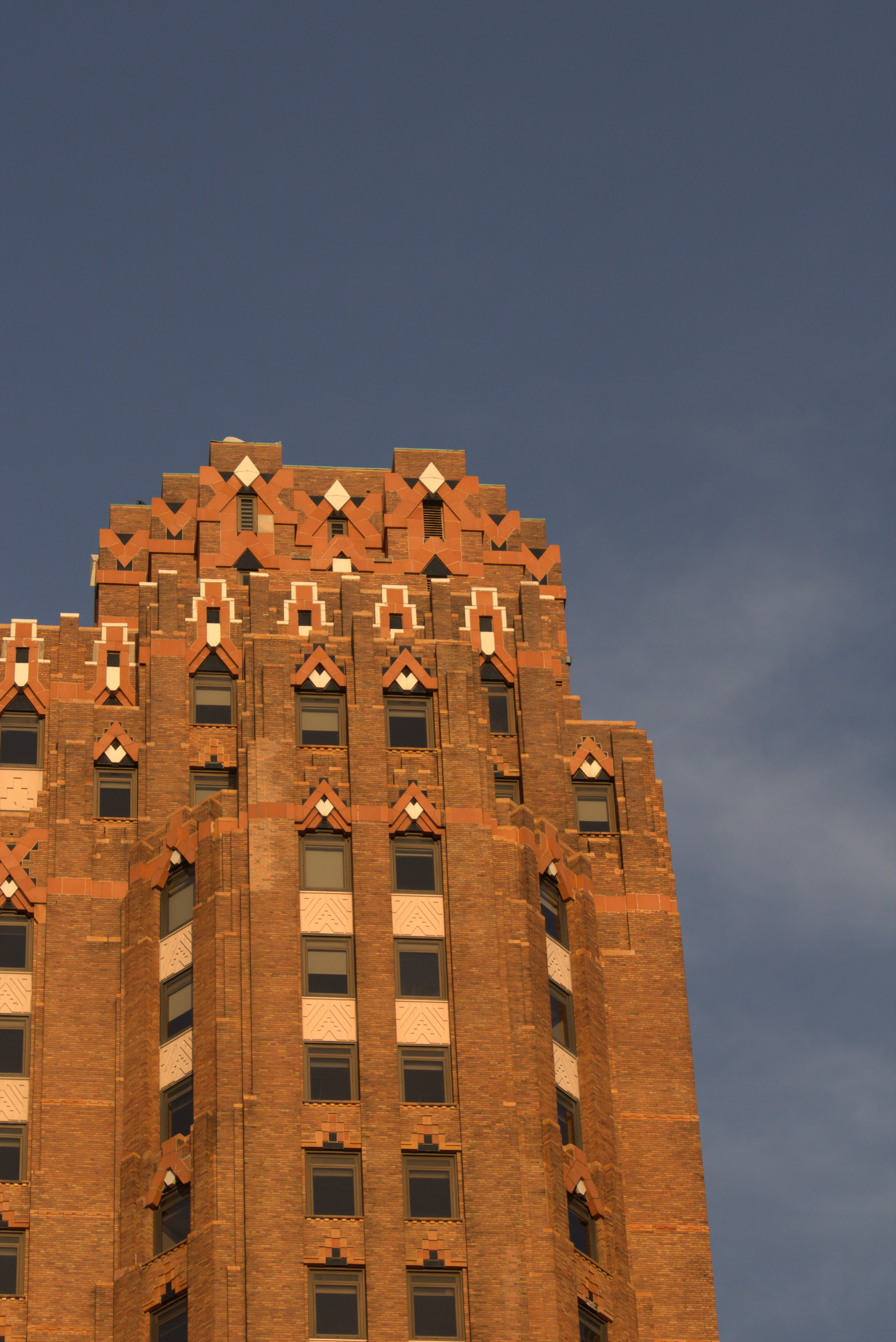
Shorter Spire

The main frame of the skyscraper rises 32 stories, capped by two asymmetric spires, one extending for seven additional stories. The roof height of the building is 496 ft (151 m), the top floor is 489 feet (149 m), and the spire reaches 632 ft (192.6 m). Its nickname, Cathedral of Finance, alludes both to the building's resemblance to a cathedral—with its tower over the main entrance and octagonal apse at the opposite end—and to New York City's Woolworth Building, which had earlier been dubbed the Cathedral of Commerce. Native American themes are common inside and outside the building. Wirt C. Rowland, of the Smith, Hinchman & Grylls firm, was the building's architect. The building rises from a granite and stone six story base with two sculptures created by Corrado Parducci flanking the Griswold Street entrance.

The architect closely supervised the building of the exterior, which includes brickwork with tile, limestone, and terra cotta. The colored brick that Rowland selected for the exterior came to be marketed by the manufacturer as “Union Trust Brick” and, after 1939, as “Guardian brick”. Rowland designed furniture for the bank's offices as well as tableware, linens, and waitress uniforms for a restaurant in the building.

The building's three-story, vaulted lobby is lavishly decorated with Pewabic and Rookwood tile. The semi-circular exterior domes are filled with Pewabic Pottery; Mary Chase Perry Stratton worked closely with the architect in the design of the symbolic decorations. (See Savage, infra.) A Monel metal screen divides the lobby from the banking hall on the second floor, the screen features a clock in the center designed by Tiffany. The building includes works by muralist Ezra Winter in the mosaic above the main lobby desk and the mural at the end of the banking hall. The large mosaic is of a pine tree and text that states the Union Trust Company's purpose for the building, "Founded on principles of faith and understating, this building is erected for the purpose of continuing and maintaining the ideals of financial services which promoted the organization of the institution". The mural highlights Michigan's industries such as manufacturing, farming and mining. In order to dampen the sound in the banking hall, its cement-plaster ceiling features a hand-painted canvas ceiling, which was stretched over a mat of horsehair.

== Innovations ==
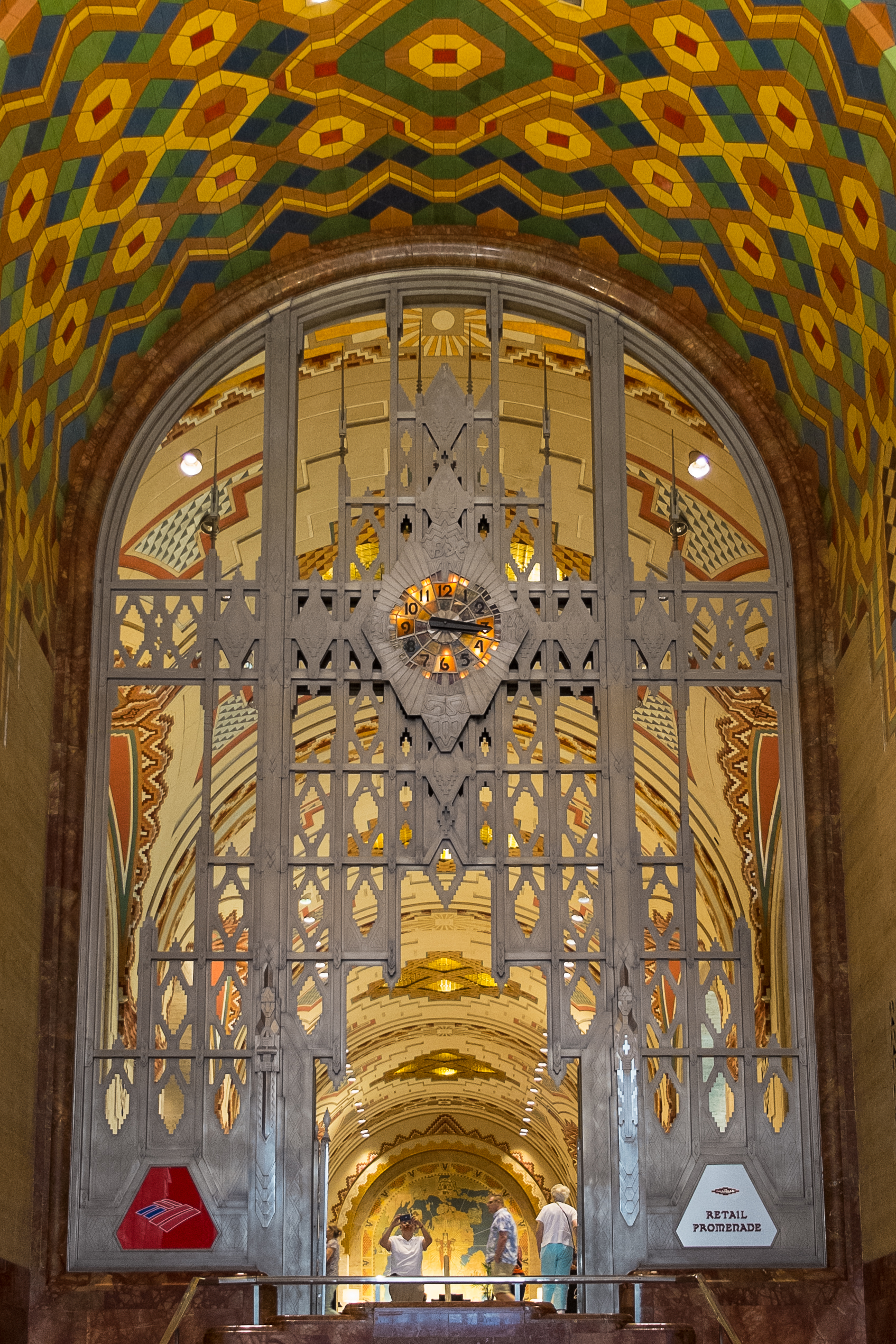
The Monel Metalwork

The Guardian Building featured innovations in both design and technology. The building's designer, Wirt Rowland, specified Monel metal in place of the commonly used brass and bronze for all exposed metalwork on the building, an innovation which was widely adopted, most notably on New York's Chrysler Building. Rowland dispensed with traditional forms of decoration, using instead colored materials (brick, stone, and terra cotta) set in geometric patterns on both the interior and exterior of the structure. The building's elevator system represented the first use of technology which automatically stopped the car level with the floor and opened the doors, tasks formerly handled by the operator.

William Edward Kapp, architect for the firm of Smith, Hinchman & Grylls has been credited with interior design work on the Guardian Building.

== History ==
The skyscraper was built by the Union Trust Company, founded in Detroit in 1890 by Senator James McMillan, and Dexter M. Ferry, along with investments from Russell A. Alger, Col. Frank J. Hecker, and Christian H. Buhl. During World War II, the Guardian Building served as the U.S. Army Command Center for war time production. The Guardian served various tenants as an office building in downtown Detroit. In 1982 it became the headquarters of Michigan Consolidated Gas Company ("MichCon") subsequent to the divestiture of MichCon by ANR Company in 1981. Under the leadership of President and COO Stephen E. Ewing, MichCon restored the lobby and vaulted ceilings on the first floor in 1986. It would stay MichCon's later to be called MCN Energy Group headquarters until the merger of MCN with DTE Energy in 2001. It was sold by DTE to a local real estate developer, the Sterling Group, in 2002.

The Sterling Group invested $14 million in the building and reopened the lobby to the public, which had only been accessible to employees after MichCon purchased the building.

On July 18, 2007, Wayne County Executive Robert Ficano announced it has entered into an agreement to purchase the Guardian Building to relocate its offices from the Wayne County Building. The deal was reportedly part of a larger deal worth $33.5 million in real estate purchases in downtown Detroit. The Guardian Building has become a souvenir item along with other Detroit skyscrapers.

== Gallery ==
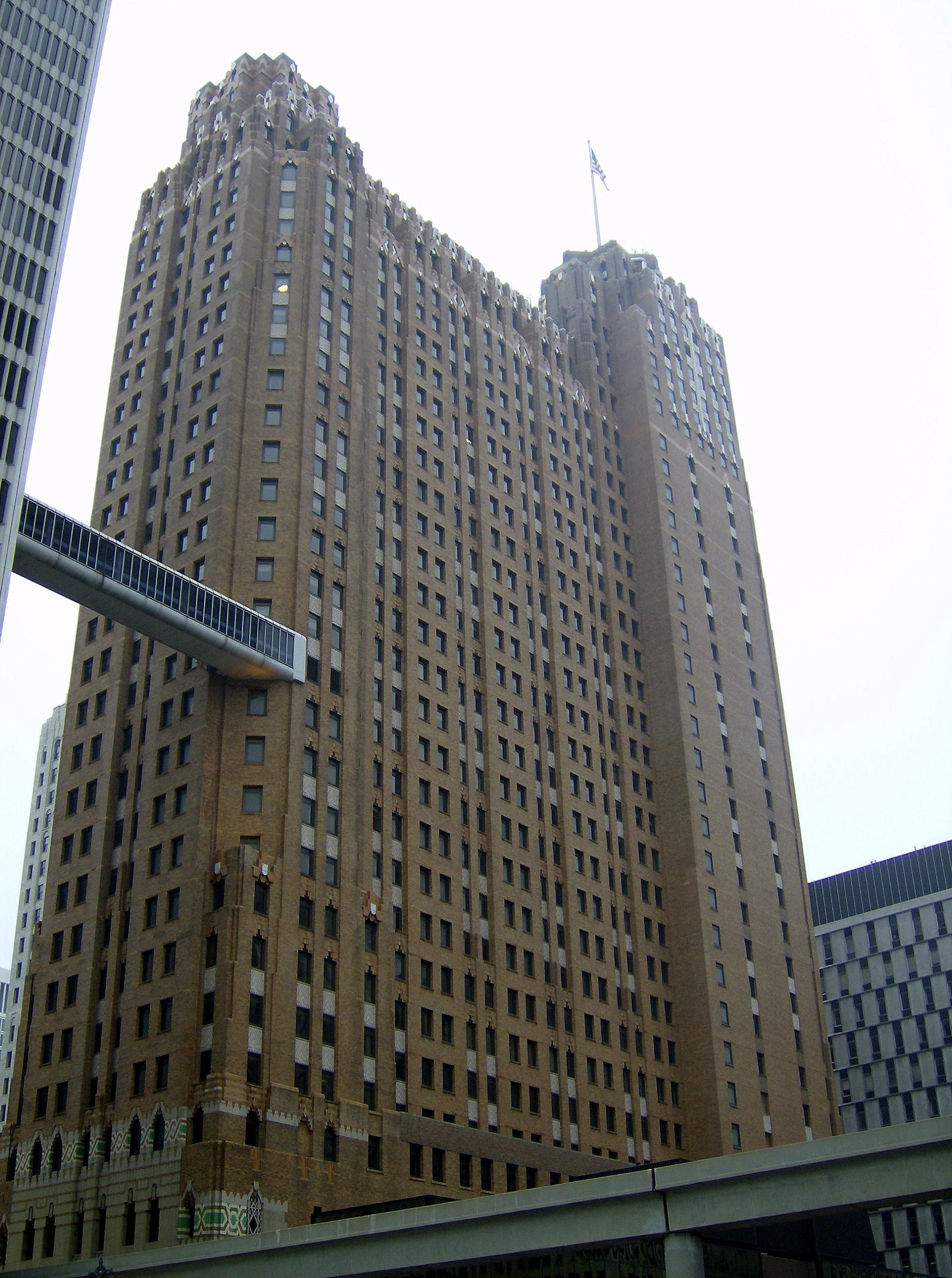
The Guardian Building, flying the American flag over the Detroit Financial District

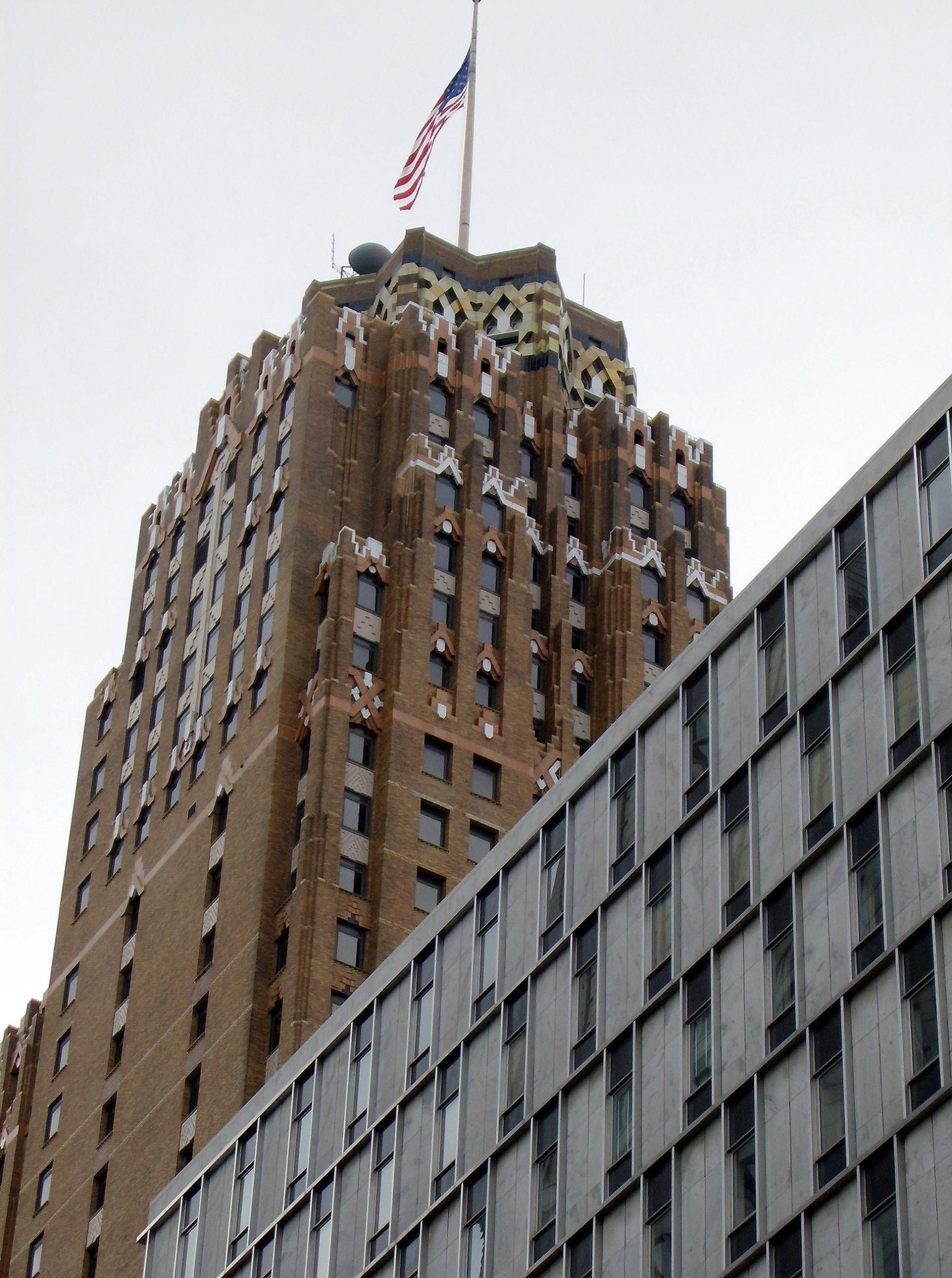
Top of the Guardian Building, with The Qube in the foreground

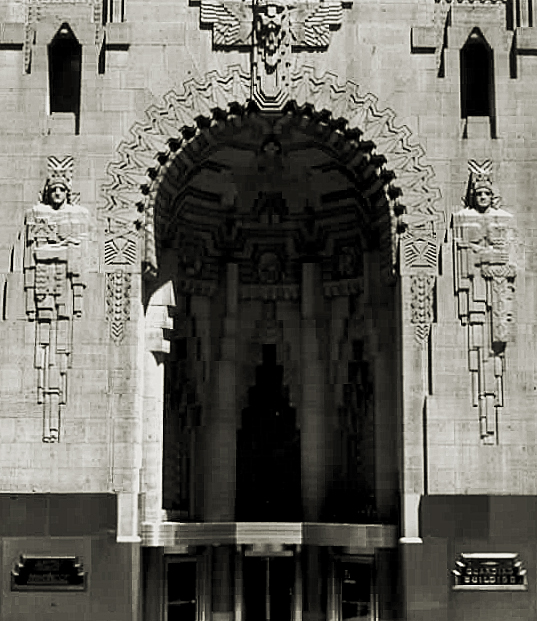
The sculptures of Safety and Security flank the main entrance

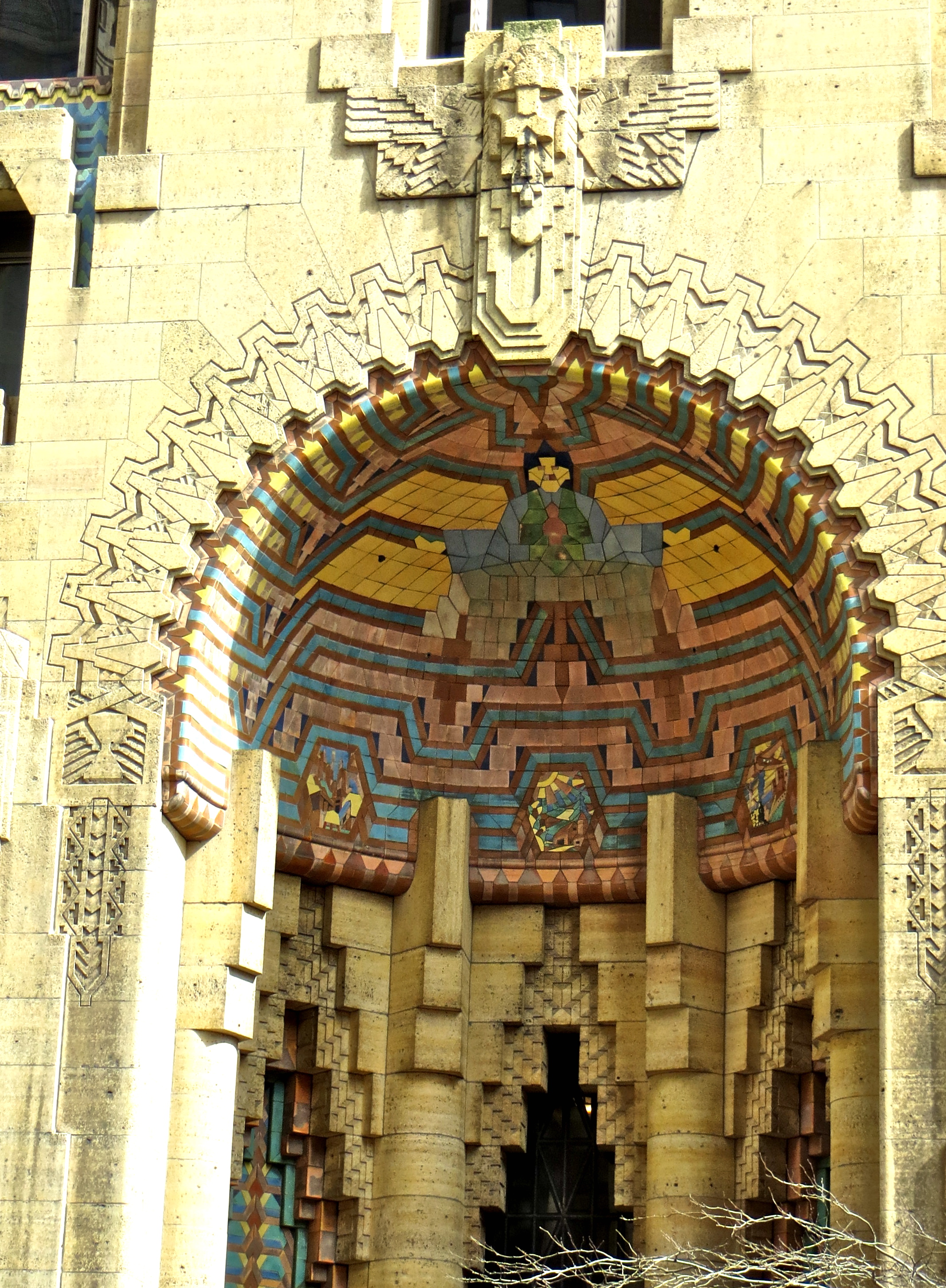
Semi-circular dome over the main entrance

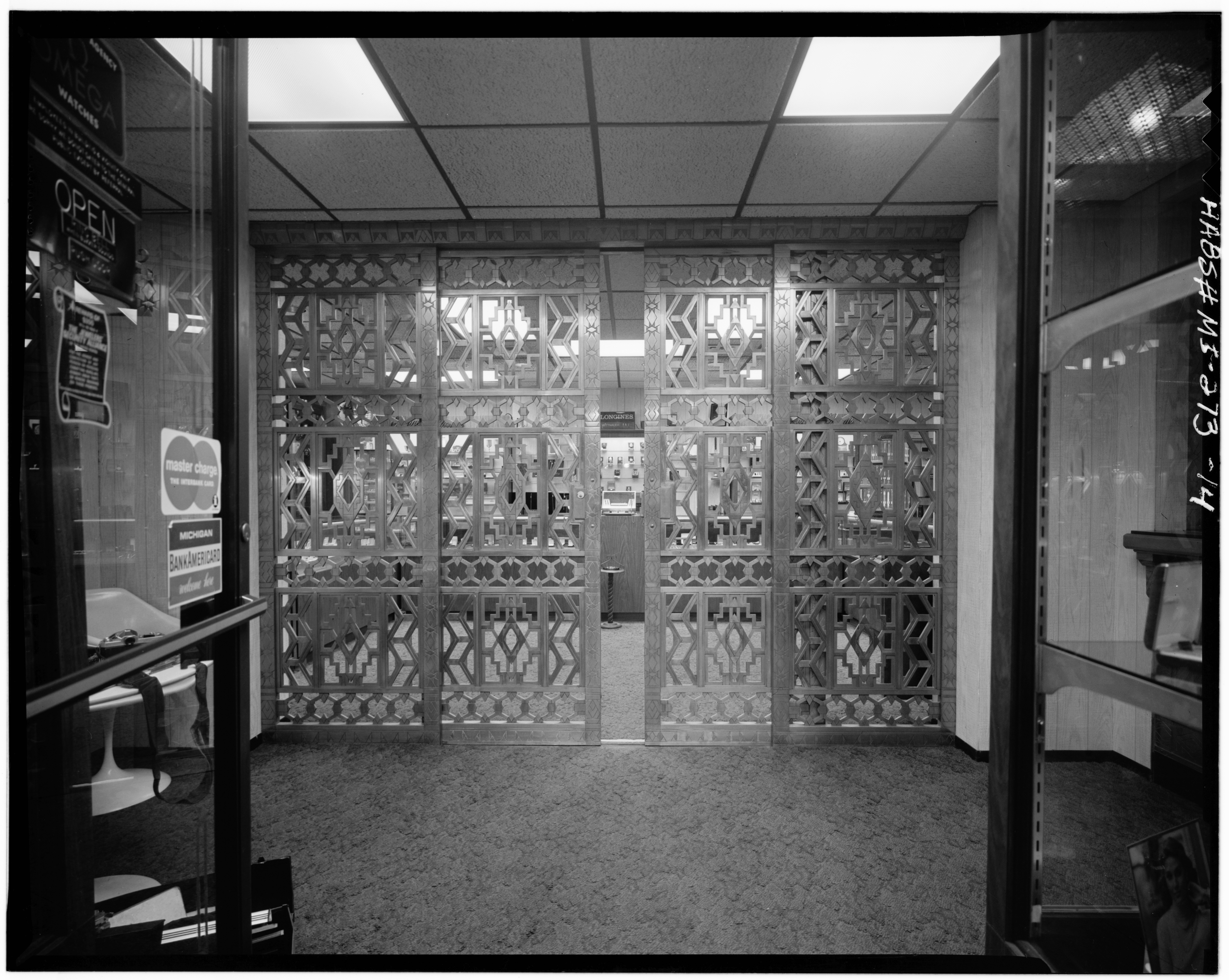
Monel metal gates in the basement

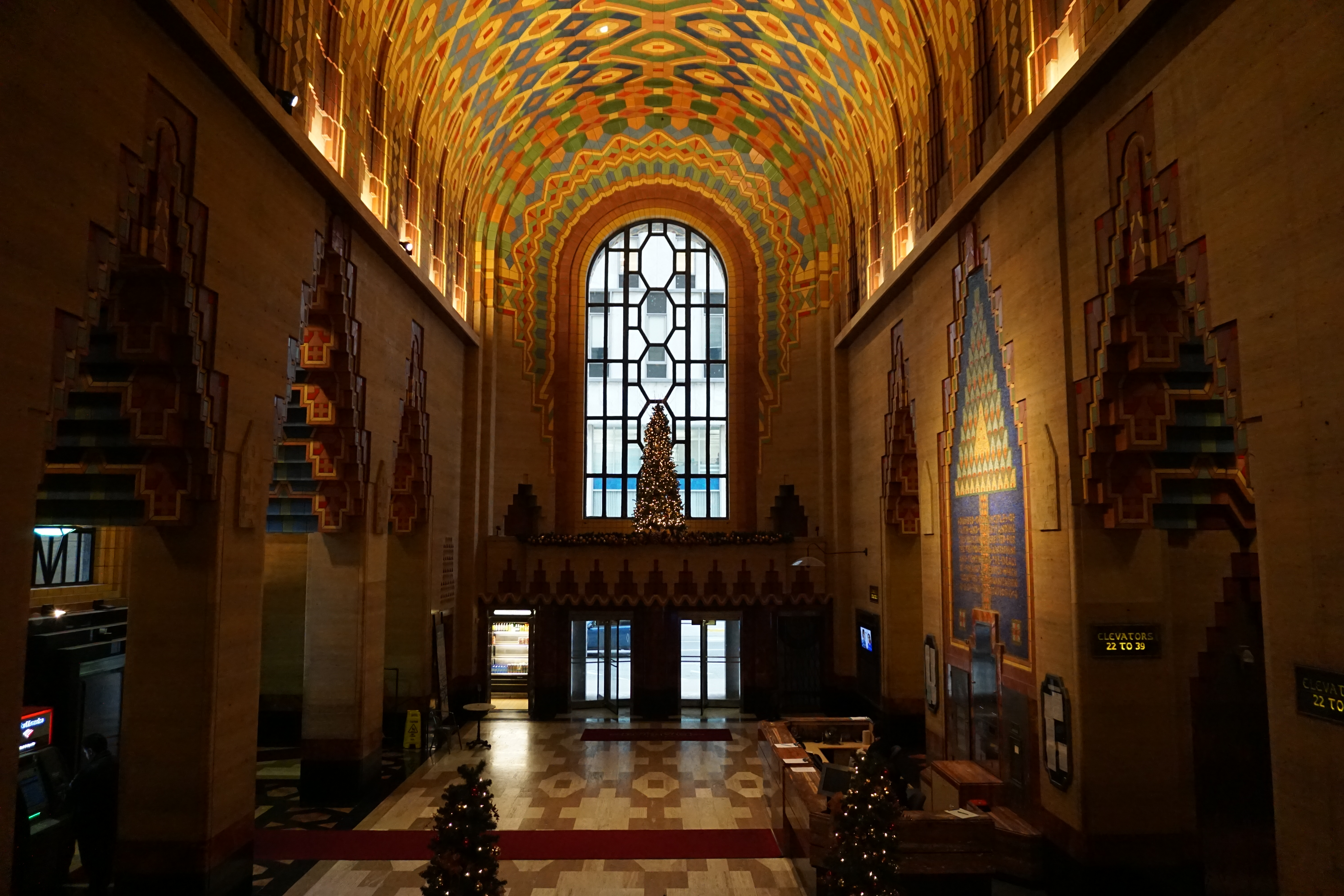
Lower lobby

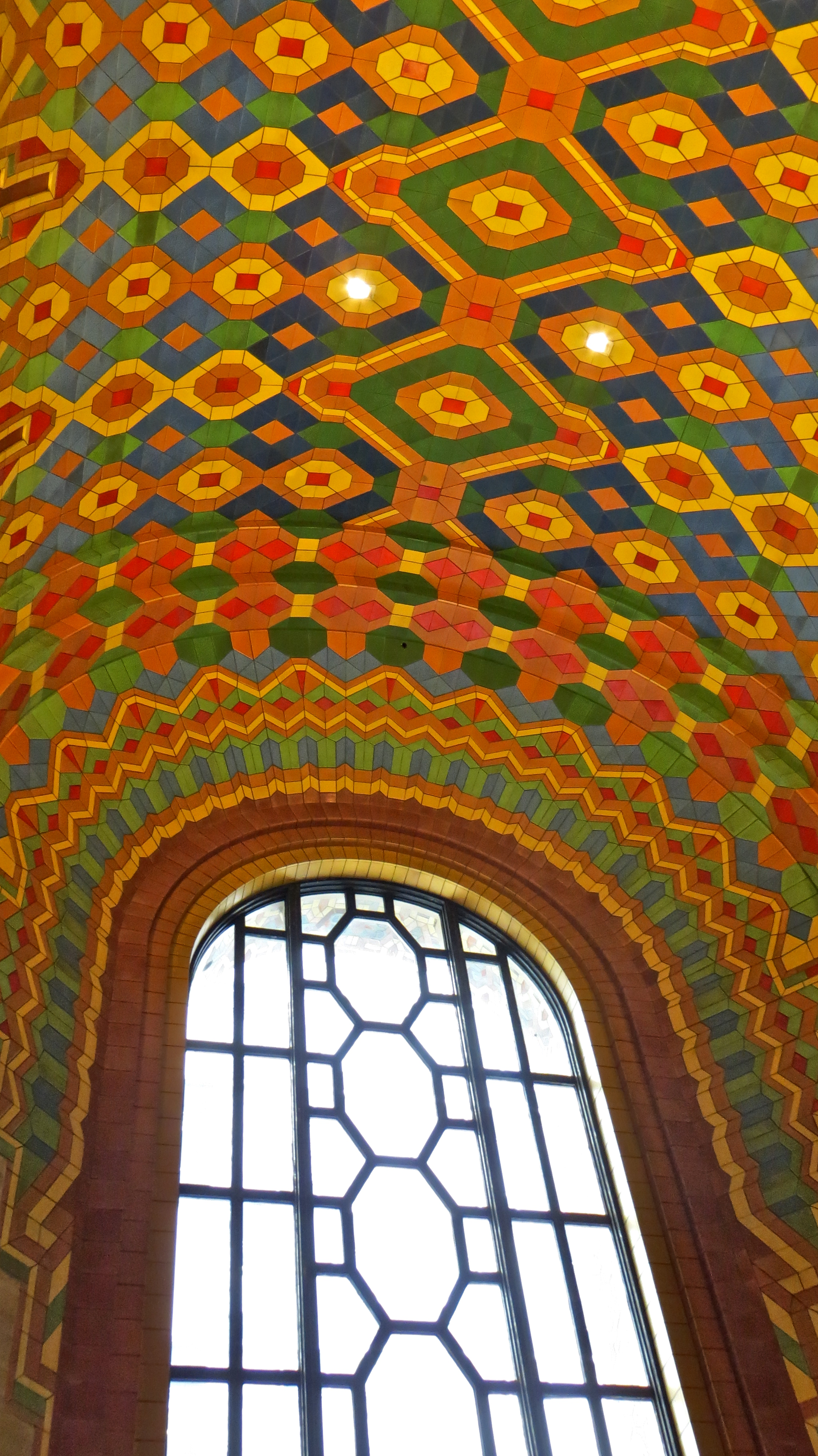
Ceiling tile in the lobby

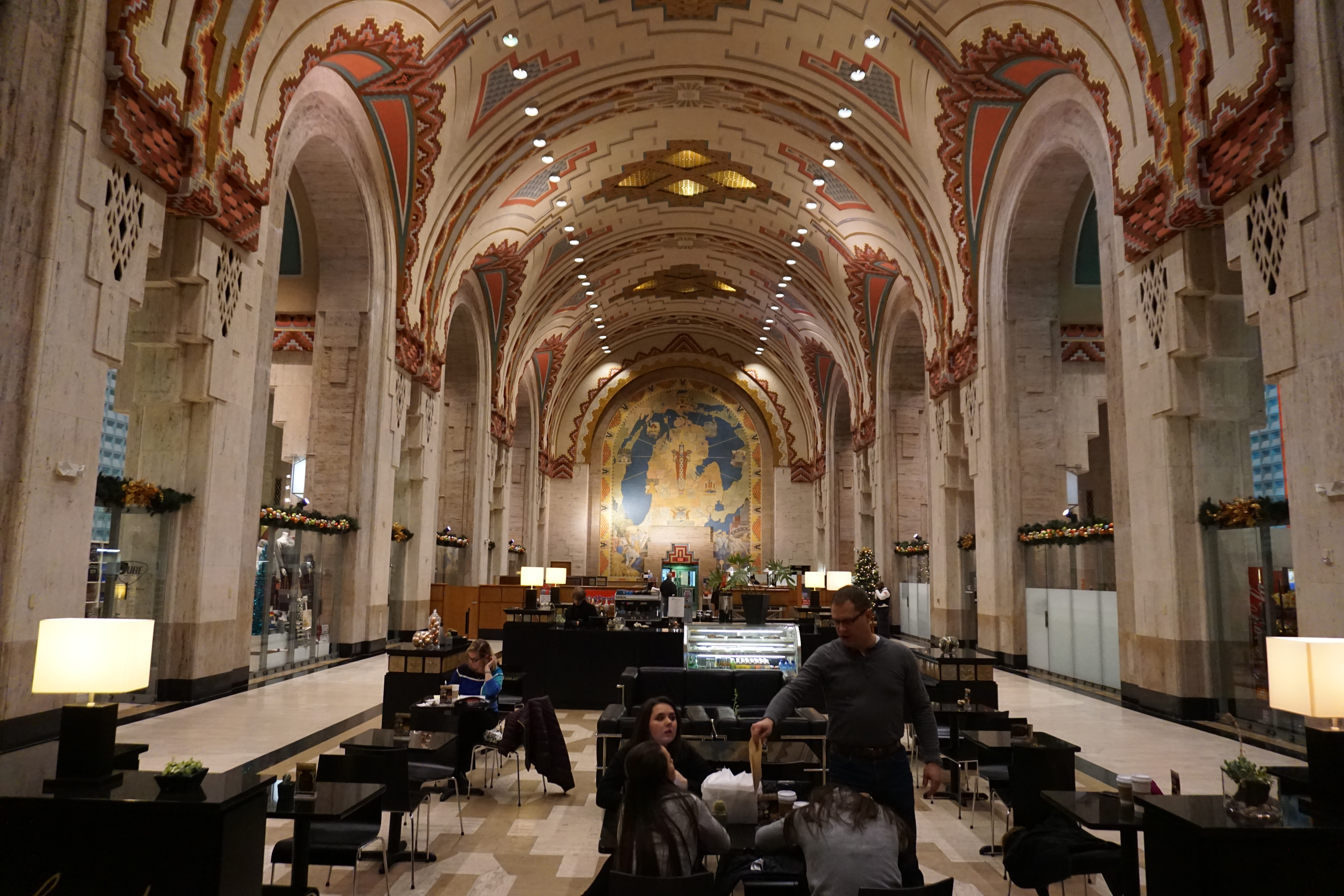
Banking hall

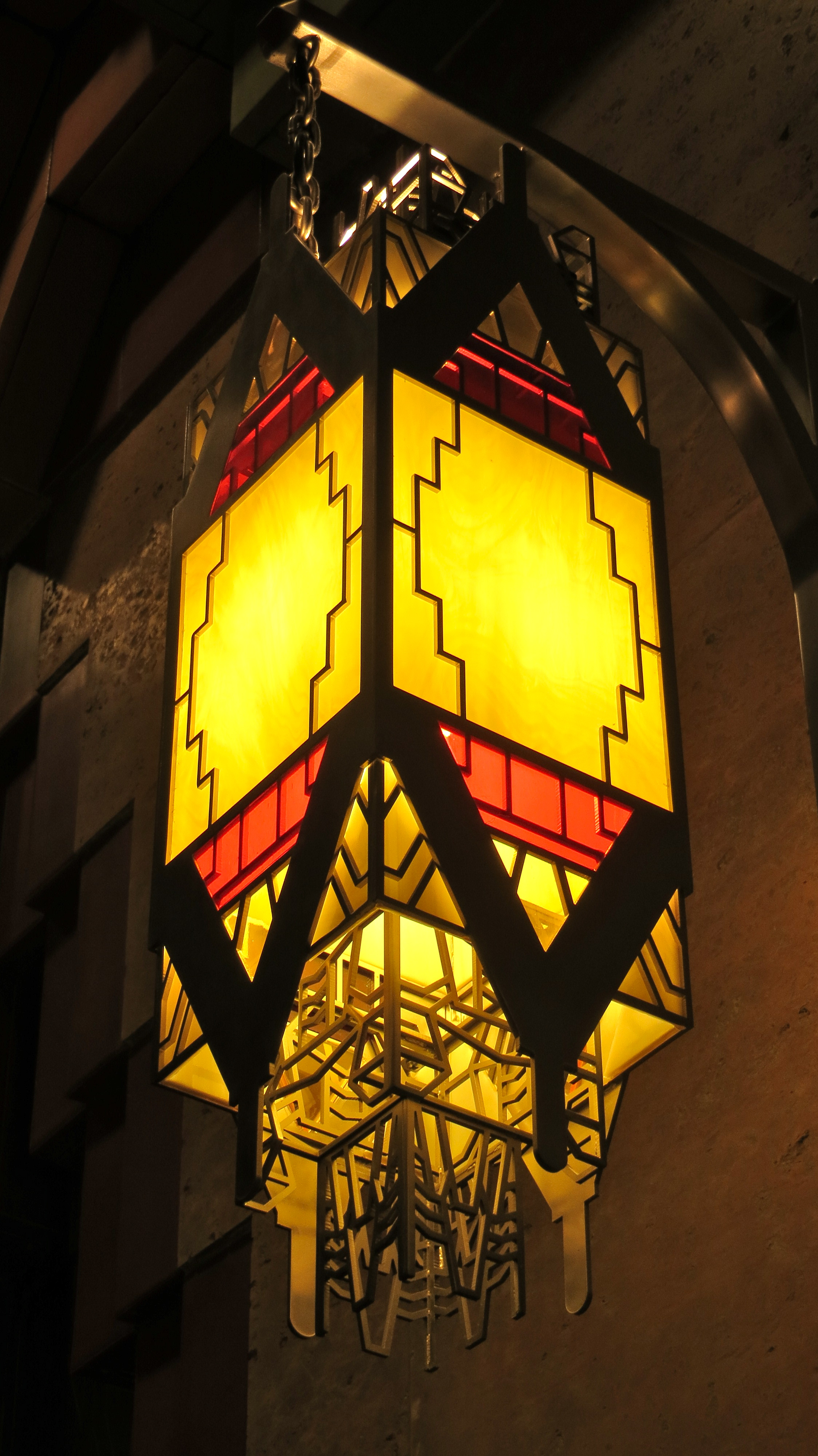
Lamp in the elevator lobby

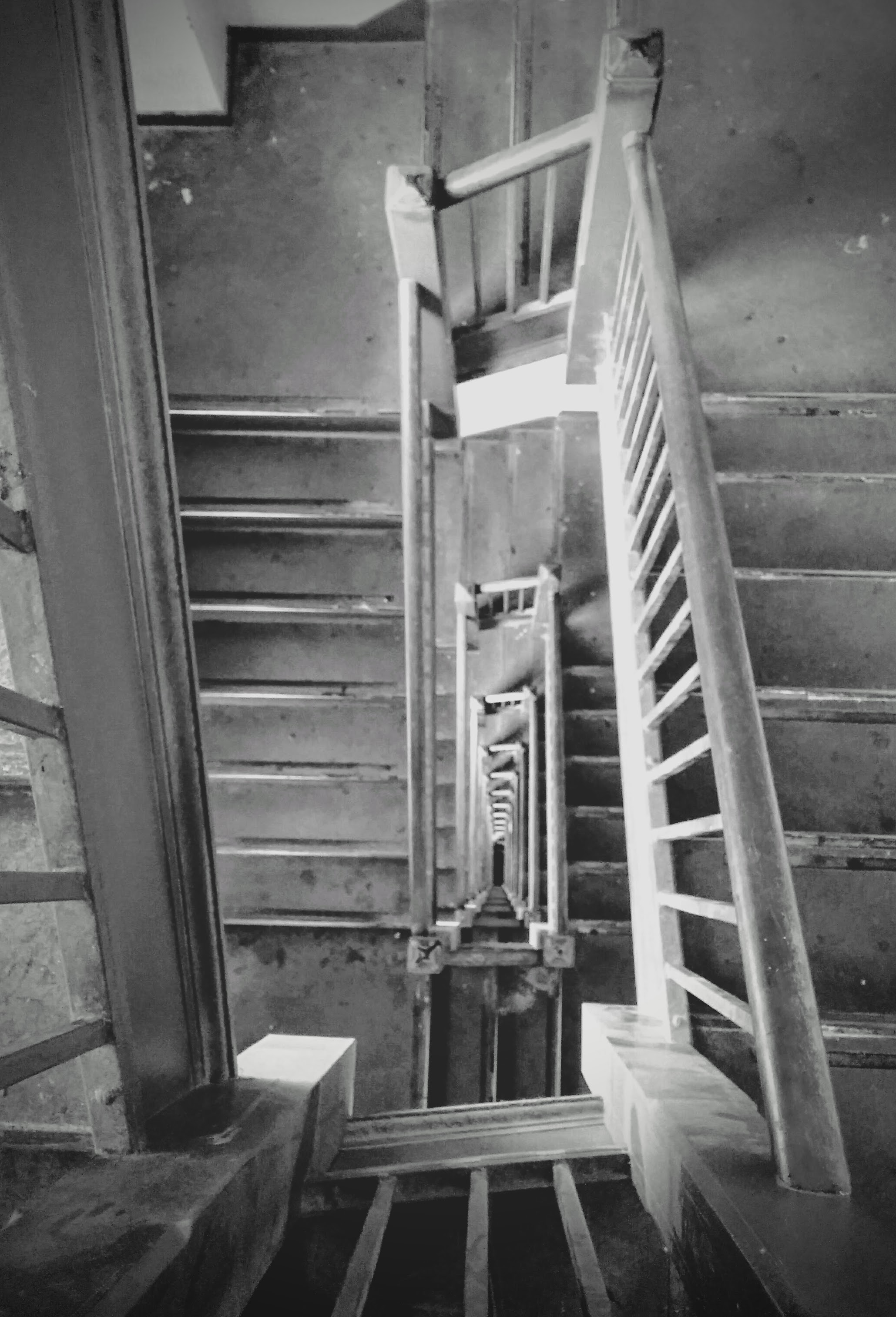
Guardian Building Stair Well

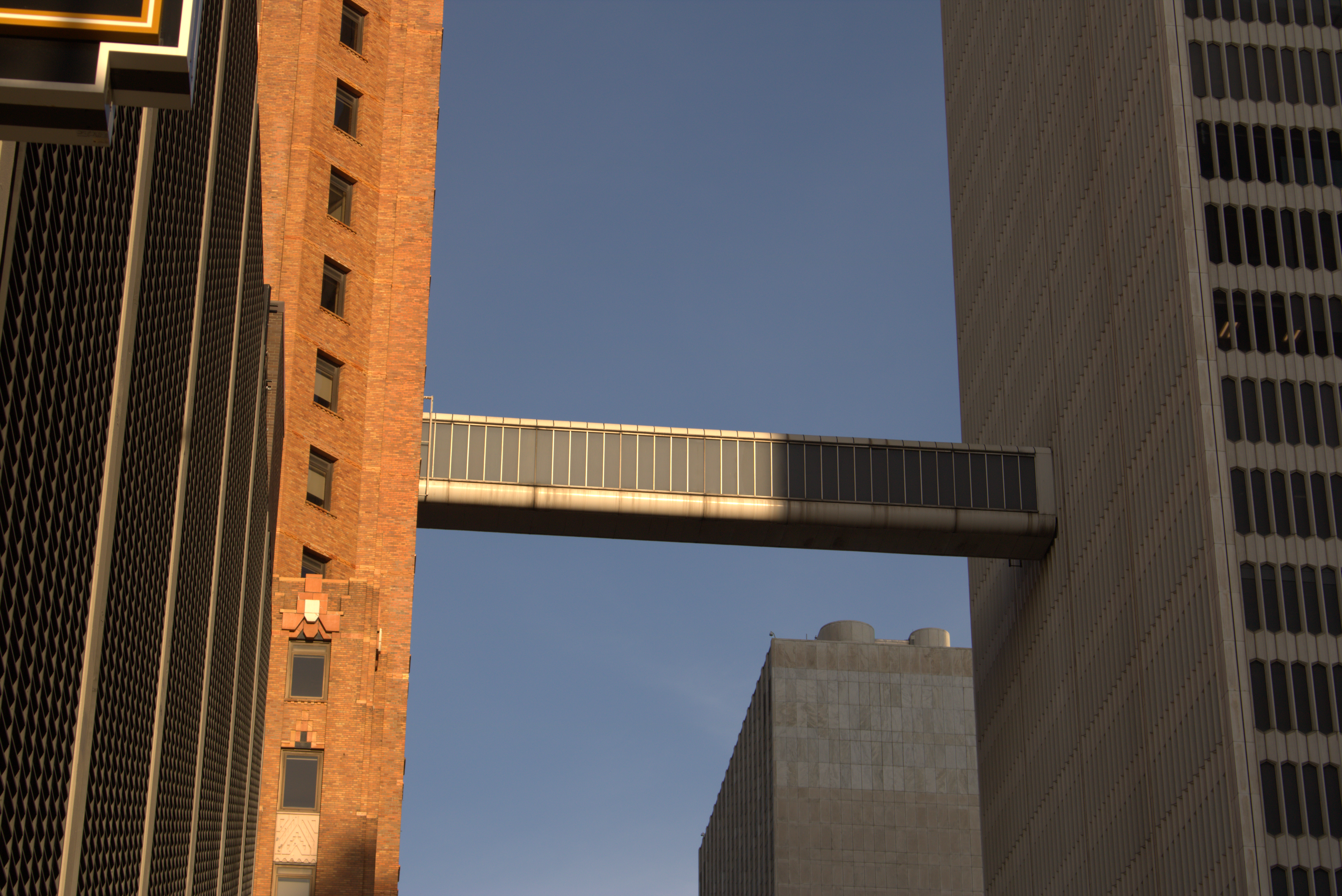
Pedestrian bridge between the Guardian Building and One Woodward Avenue

== See also ==
- Buhl Building
- Cadillac Place
- David Stott Building
- Fisher Building
- List of tallest buildings in Detroit
- Penobscot Building
- List of National Historic Landmarks in Michigan
- National Register of Historic Places listings in Detroit
