= One Woodward Avenue =

Skyscraper in Detroit

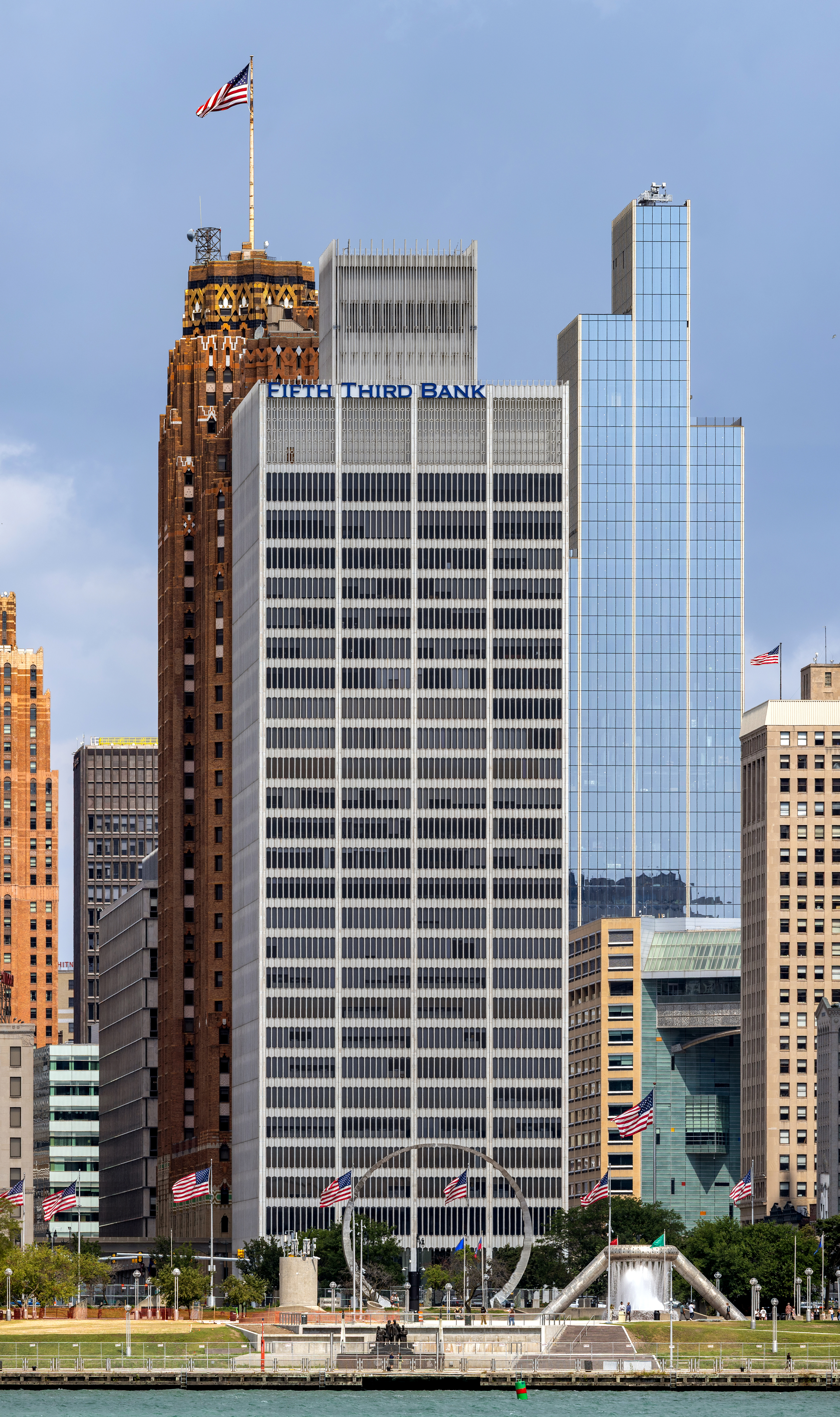
- Interactive map of the One Woodward Avenue area

General information
- Status: Completed
- Type: Office
- Architectural style: International Style
- Completed: 1962
- Owner: Bedrock Detroit

Height
- Roof: 430 feet (130 m)
- Top floor: 345 ft (105 m)

Technical details
- Floor count: 28
- Floor area: 447,725 sq ft (41,595.0 m^{2})

Design and construction
- Architects: Minoru Yamasaki; SmithGroup

Other information
- Public transit: Financial District; Congress Street; DDOT 3, 5, 6, 9, 40, 52, 67; SMART FAST Michigan 261, Woodward 461, 462, Gratiot 561
- Michigan Consolidated Gas Company Building
- U.S. Historic district – Contributing property
- Location: 1 Woodward Avenue; Detroit, Michigan
- Coordinates: 42°19′44″N 83°2′44″W
- Part of: Detroit Financial District (ID09001067)
- Designated CP: December 14, 2009

One Woodward Avenue (formerly known as the Michigan Consolidated Gas Company Building and American Natural Resources Building) is a 28-story office tower in downtown Detroit, Michigan. Located in the city's Financial District, it overlooks Hart Plaza and the International Riverfront. It was designed by Minoru Yamasaki in the International style, and completed in 1962.

== History ==
Minoru Yamasaki designed the new headquarters for the Michigan Consolidated Gas Company in 1962. The Michigan Consolidated Gas Building was his first skyscraper, and he used elements from this design for the original World Trade Center in New York City. His design for McGregor Memorial Conference Center at Wayne State University is also highly regarded by architects.

In the 1980s, the building became the American Natural Resources Building when that company was formed as the parent of Michigan Consolidated Gas. At this time, a pedestrian bridge was added over West Larned Street at the 14th floor to connect the ANR offices to Michigan Consolidated, which had relocated to the adjacent Guardian Building. When the ANR offices moved from the building in the 1990s, it was given its current name.

In December 2012, Quicken Loans founder Dan Gilbert announced that his company, Rock Ventures, had purchased the building and that Quicken Loans would occupy eight-floors in the structure. The building joins the nearby Qube, First National Building, Chrysler House, and 1001 Woodward in Rock Ventures' real estate portfolio.

October 28, 2014, Fifth Third Bank announced plans to relocate its Michigan Regional Headquarters from Southfield to Downtown Detroit in what will be named the Fifth Third Bank Building at One Woodward. The bank occupies approximately 62,000 sq ft (5,800 m^{2}) of the structure and has also pledged an investment totaling $85 million to the city of Detroit to accompany the transition to its new regional headquarters.

== Architecture ==
The main structure sits on a raised platform that conceals the loading dock and service entrances. It contains 26 usable floors, a double-height mechanical penthouse, and one floor below ground, reaching a height of 430 feet (130 m) The lobby rises two stories from the base and is enclosed by glass panels framed in chrome. Accent panels have the same hexagonal design as the window frames on the upper stories. The lobby walls are recessed from the building facade to create a loggia on all four sides of the building. The floor of the loggia is covered with white marble cut in a hexagonal design and flows uninterrupted to the interior lobby floor and up the walls of the elevator banks. The ceiling of the main level consists of coffered square panels that have a recessed light fixture. Beneath each light bulb, a four-armed anodized aluminum frame holds a blue plexiglass sphere that diffuses the light and casts color onto the white floor. These specialized light fixtures, which Yamasaki developed with the assistance of sculptor Lee DuSell, were meant to portray the jet of blue flame often seen with gas appliances. Yamasaki had meant the light fixtures to be a tribute to the clients, and original tenants of the building; The Michigan Consolidated Gas Company.

The two elevator lobbies have a dropped ceiling that rises to a gable point and again reflects the windows of the upper stories. The lobby holds only planters and a security desk, against the original wishes of gas company executives. In their request for designs, they wished the lobby to include a showroom for gas appliances with a large sign proclaiming Gas is best, the company's slogan at the time. During his presentation, Yamasaki was able to convince company leaders that the clean lines of an unadorned lobby would enhance the company's image more than a showroom. For this reason, the newsstand traditionally seen in large office buildings is located on the lower level.

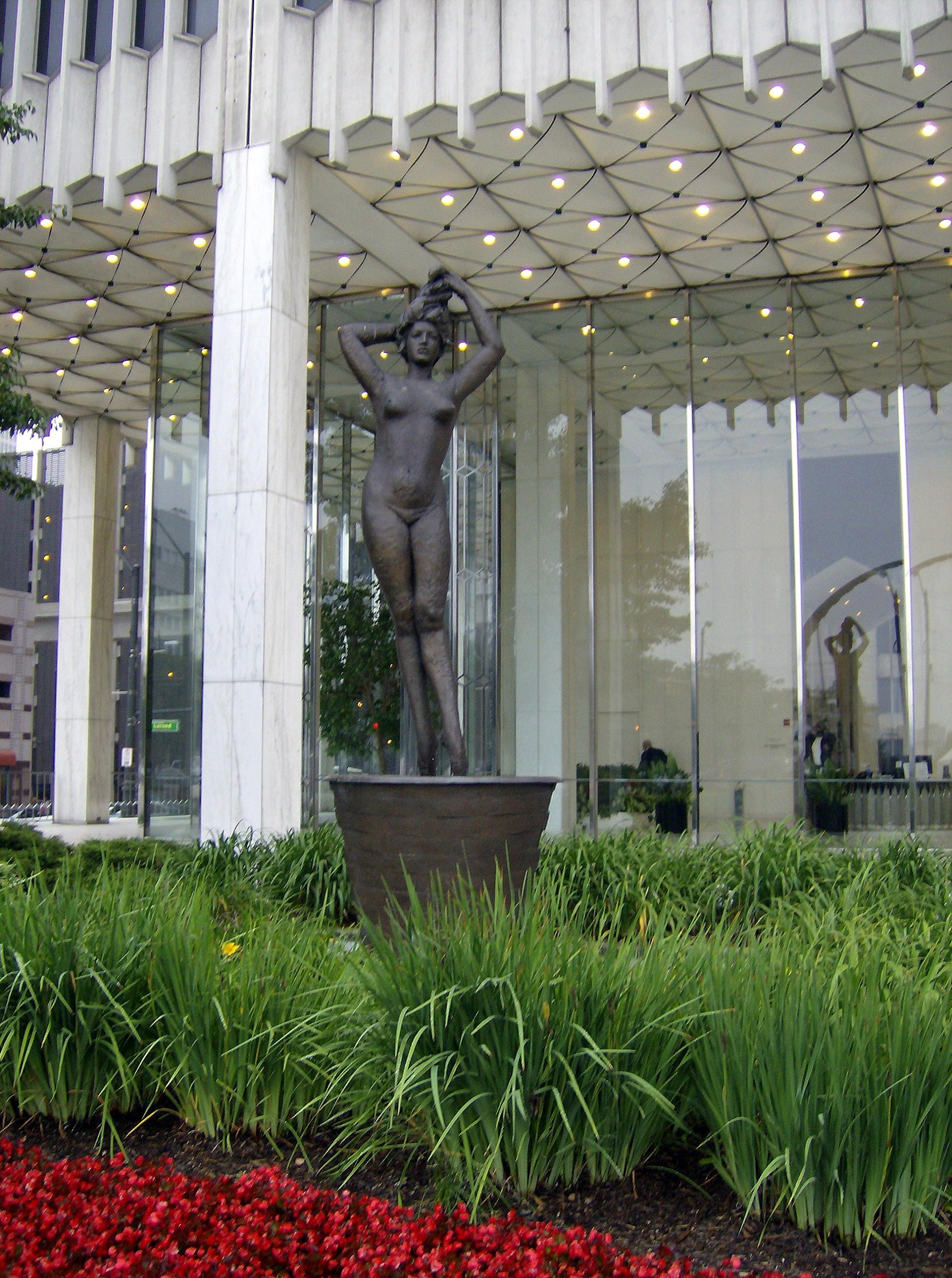
Passo di Danza by Giacomo Manzù

Yamasaki commissioned Giacomo Manzù, an Italian sculptor with important liturgical commissions in St. Peter's Basilica in Vatican City, to craft the graceful Passo di Danza (Step of the Dance) for the Jefferson Avenue entrance. The sculpture originally stood in the center of a reflecting pool that had gas torches on its surface. Because of leakage into the loading dock below, much of the pool was filled with plantings in the 1980s. On at least one occasion, the sculpture was the target of pranksters who painted large green footprints leading to it from The Spirit of Detroit statue across Woodward Avenue to suggest a late-night visit.

The façade of the structure consists of piers clad in white marble that tie into the base and divide each side into four bays. The windows of the upper floors are only 12 inches wide and set into pre-cast panels made of concrete and marble chips that cover two floors. Although the windows extend nearly floor-to-ceiling, their narrowness avoids the feeling of acrophobia, a condition to which Yamasaki is said to have been subject. The top and bottom of the window openings meet in a stylized arch, resulting in a delicate lattice appearance that Yamasaki re-used in his designs for the IBM Building in Seattle, the Oberlin Conservatory of Music, and the World Trade Center towers. The lattice is uninterrupted from the second through 28th floors, although on the mechanical floors above 26, the spaces in the lattice remain open instead of being glazed. These floors are enclosed by a recessed wall and the space between the outer and inner walls is illuminated after dark. From the building's opening through the early 1980s, the 26th floor was occupied by an upscale restaurant known as The Top of the Flame.

Air-conditioning and mechanical equipment on the roof are concealed by a similar lattice work and also illuminated after nightfall. During much of the year, the lighting is white; however, the color is changed for special events, being red and green during December and red, white, and blue prior to the U.S. Independence Day and Canada Day holidays.

== Gallery ==
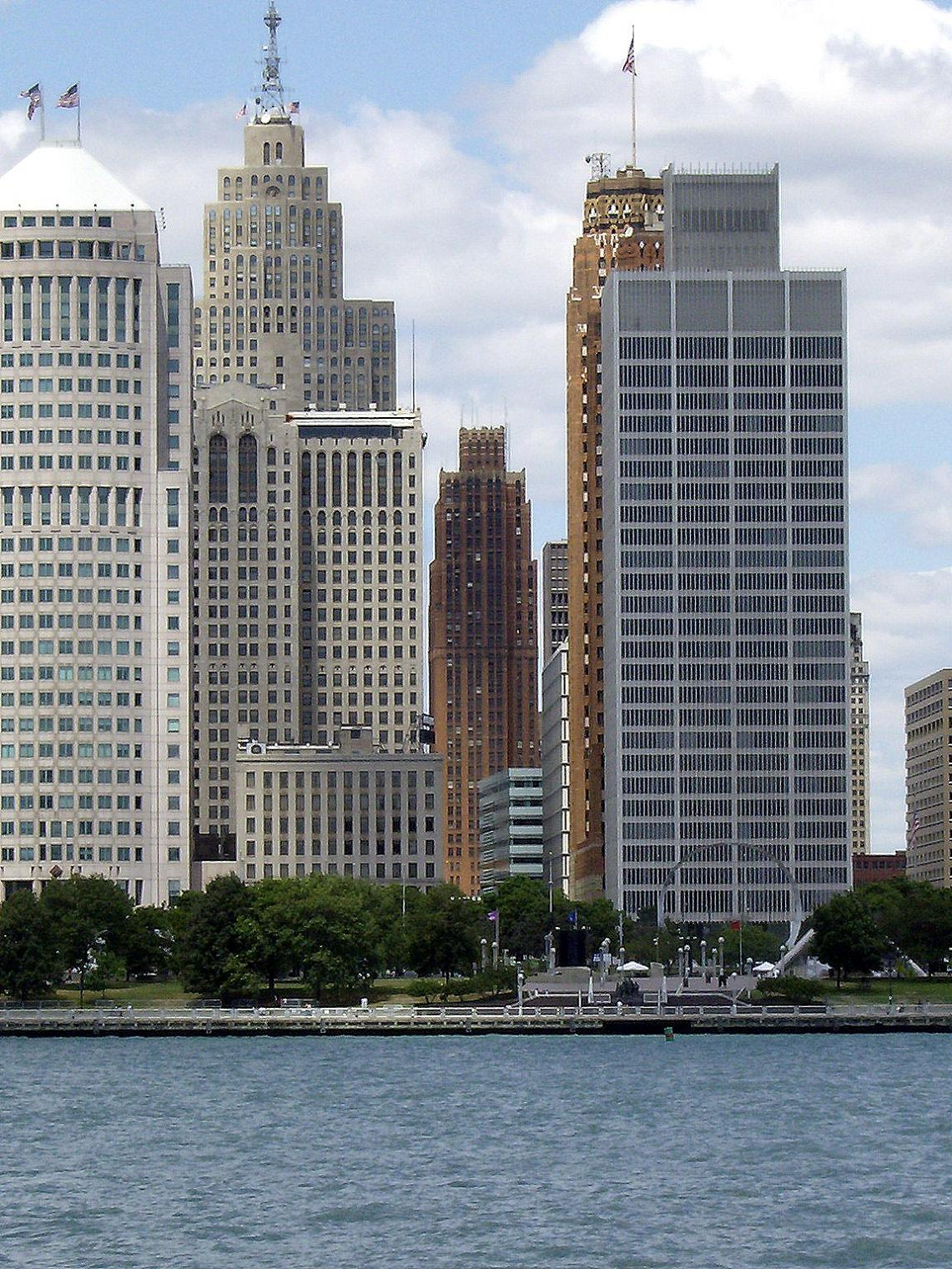
One Woodward Avenue in the Detroit Financial District

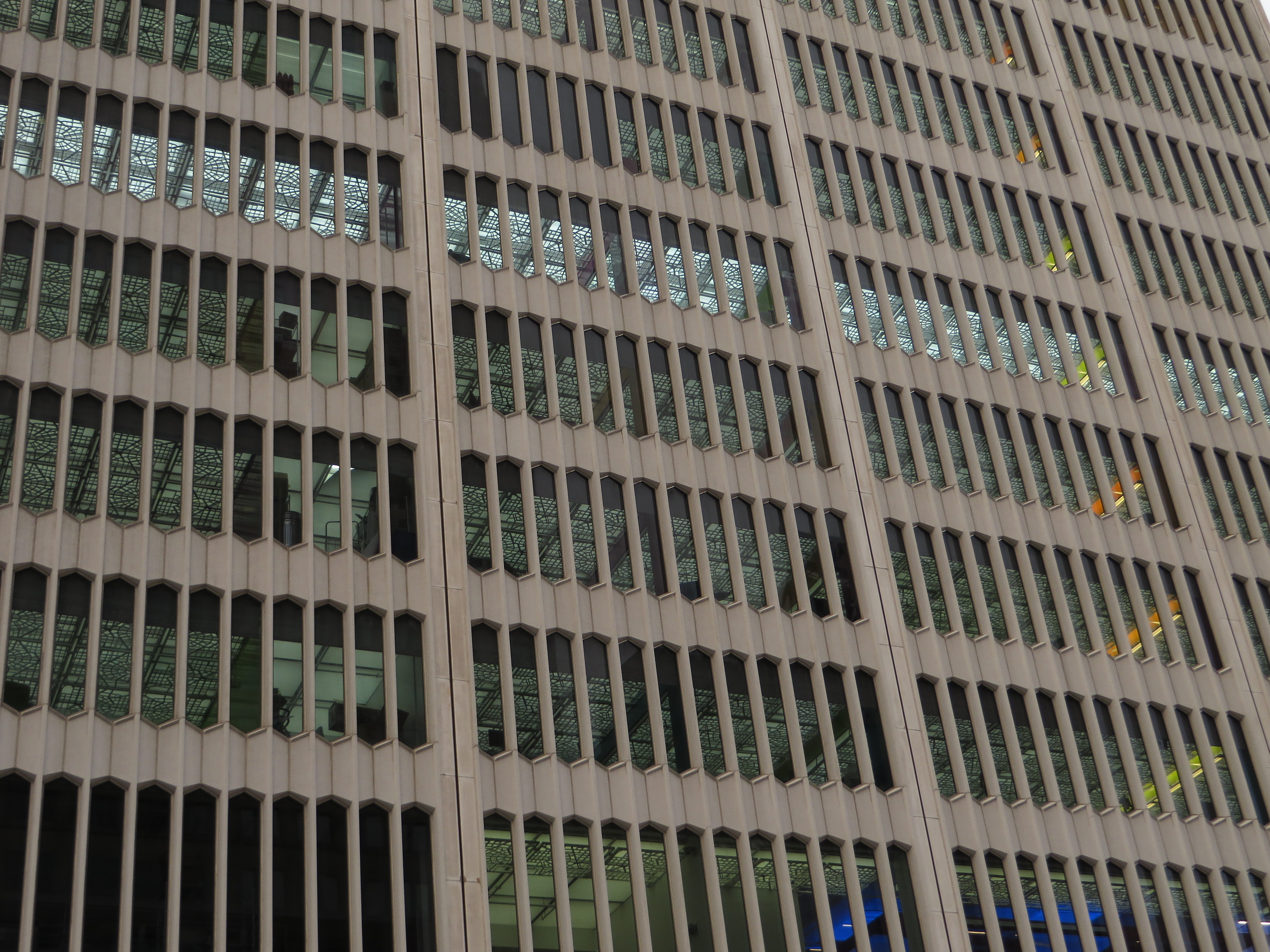
Façade

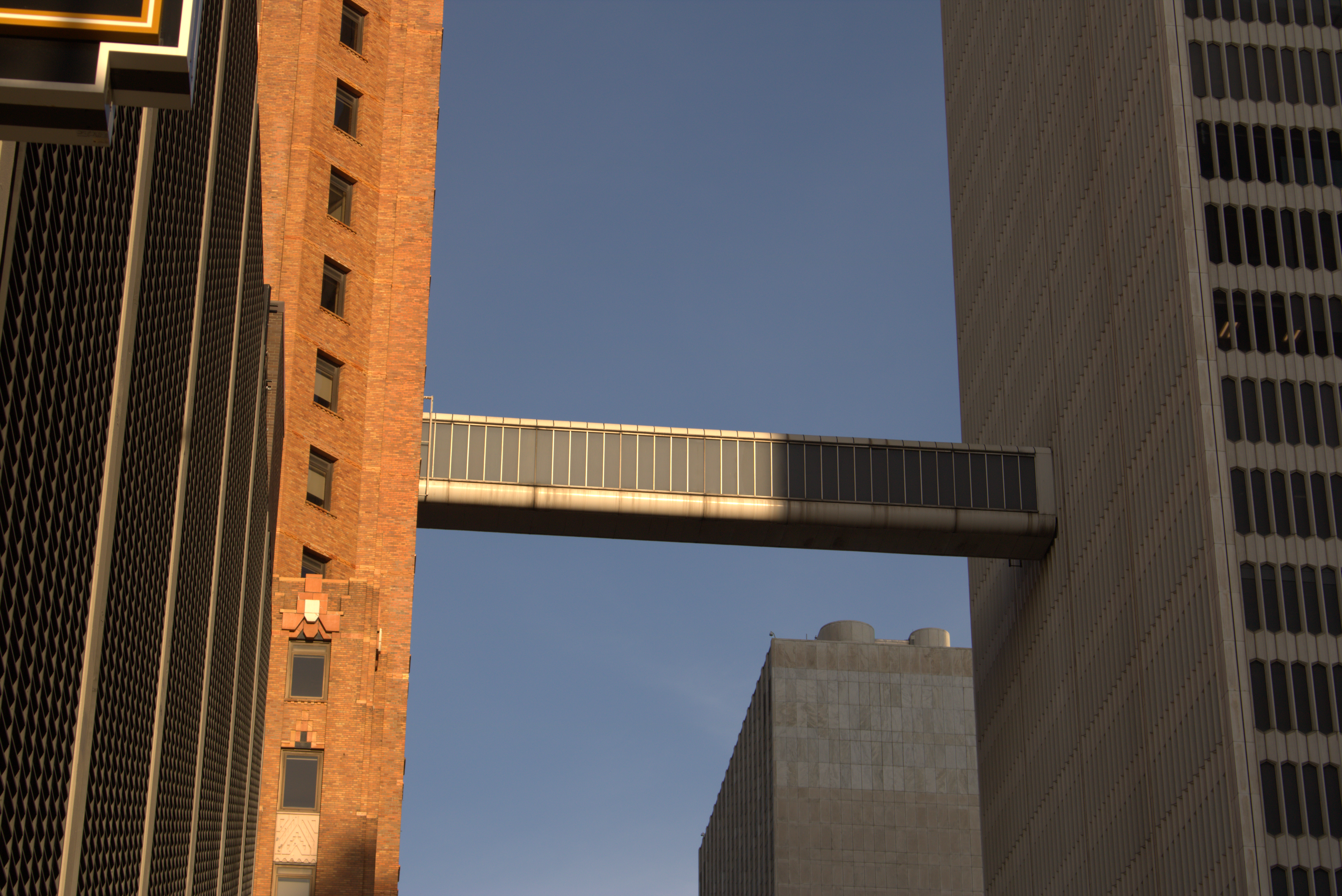
Pedestrian bridge between One Woodward and the Guardian Building

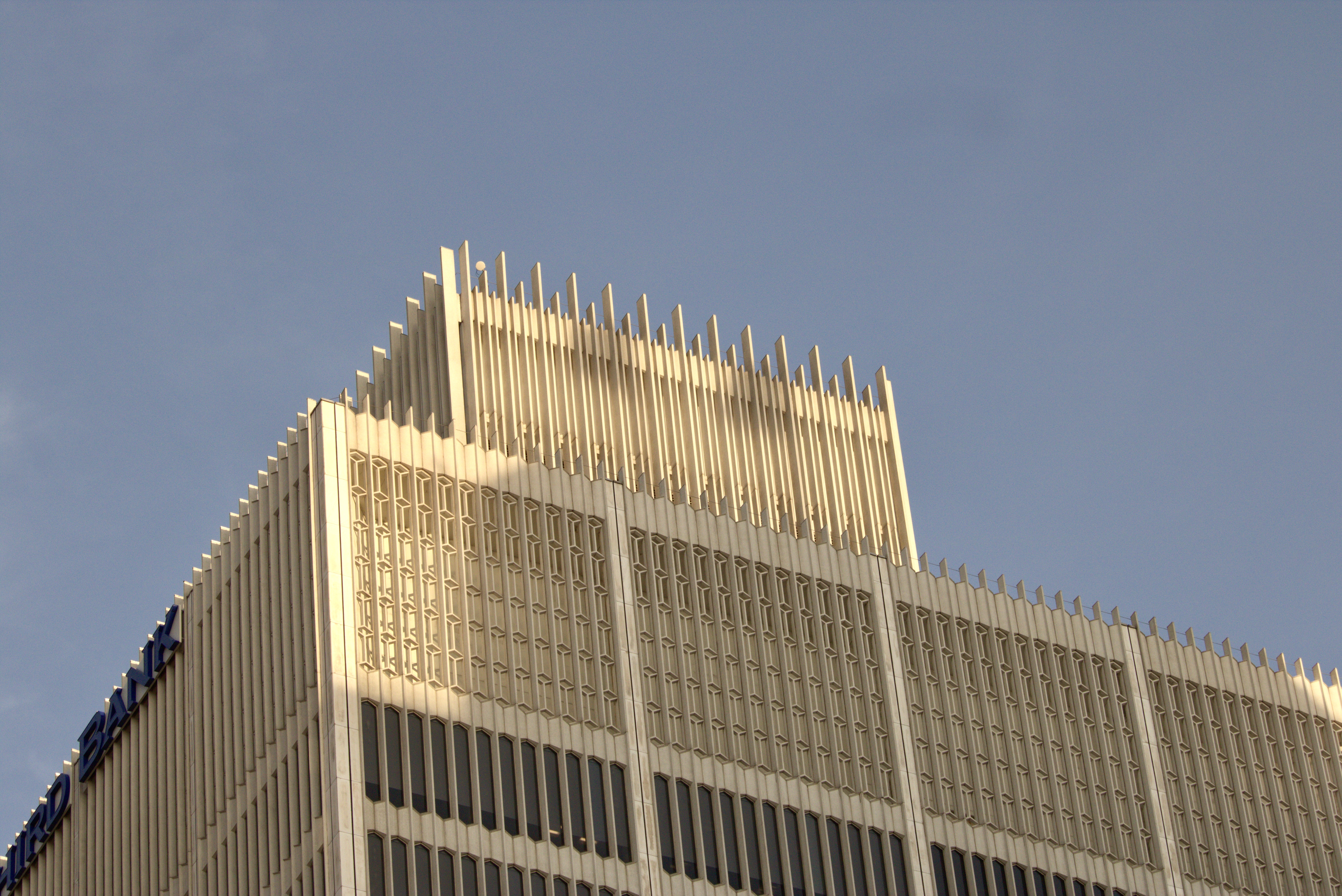
Detail of the top of One Woodward Avenue

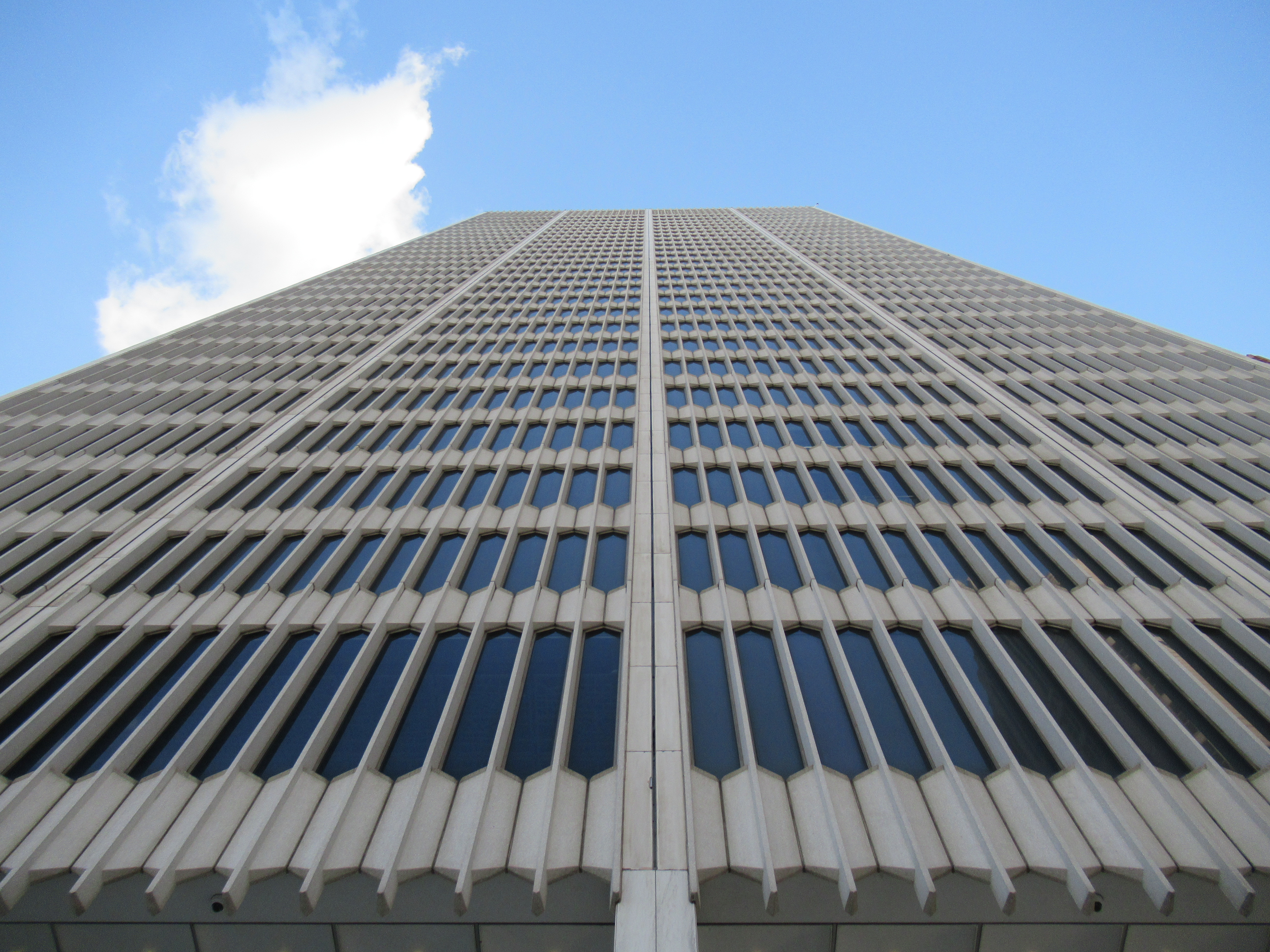
Façade looking up from Woodward Avenue

== See also ==
- List of tallest buildings in Detroit
