= List of National Historic Landmarks in Michigan =

Michigan National Historic Landmarks (clickable map)

The National Historic Landmarks in Michigan represent Michigan's history from pre-colonial days through World War II, and encompasses several landmarks detailing the state's automotive, maritime and mining industries. There are 42 National Historic Landmarks (NHL) in the state, located in 18 of its 83 counties. The landmarks also cover sites of military significance, such as Fort Michilimackinac, religious significance, such as the St. Ignace Mission, and cultural significance, such as the Fox Theater and Ernest Hemingway's boyhood summer cottage. In addition, two previously designated landmarks have lost that status due to the demolition of the sites.

The National Historic Landmark Program is administered by the National Park Service, a branch of the Department of the Interior. The National Park Service determines which properties meet NHL criteria and makes nomination recommendations after an owner notification process. The Secretary of the Interior reviews nominations and, based on a set of predetermined criteria, makes a decision on NHL designation or a determination of eligibility for designation. Both public and privately owned properties can be designated as NHLs. This designation provides indirect, partial protection of the historic integrity of the properties via tax incentives, grants, monitoring of threats, and other means. Owners may object to the nomination of the property as an NHL. When this is the case the Secretary of the Interior can only designate a site as eligible for designation.

All NHLs are also included on the National Register of Historic Places (NRHP), a list of historic properties that the National Park Service deems to be worthy of preservation. The NHLs in Michigan comprise approximately 2% of the 1,757 properties and districts listed on the National Register of Historic Places in Michigan as of January 2012. The primary difference between an NHL and an NRHP listing is that the NHLs are determined to have national significance, while other NRHP properties are deemed significant at the local or state level.

Wayne County, the location of the automotive capital Detroit, has the most NHLs, with 13, followed by Emmet County and Mackinac County with three each. Five counties have two each, and eight counties each have one listing. Michigan's first NHLs were designated on October 9, 1960, when three locations were chosen. The latest designation was made on January 13, 2021. Eleven Historic Landmarks in Michigan are more specifically designated National Historic Landmark Districts, meaning that they cover a large area rather than a single building.

== Current NHLs in Michigan ==
^{#}	National Historic Landmark
^{†}	National Historic Landmark District
^{*}	Delisted Landmark

- Numbers represent an ordering by significant words. Different colors, defined here, differentiate the National Historic Landmark Districts from other NHL buildings, structures, sites or objects.

	Landmark name	Image	Date designated	Location	County	Description
1^{†}	Bay View	Bay View	December 23, 1987 (#72000613)	Bear Creek; 45°23′08″N 84°55′49″W	Emmet	Established in 1876 as a Methodist camp meeting, this romantically-planned campground was converted to an independent chautauqua in 1885, a role it served until 1915. These two uniquely American community forms are exemplified in this extensive and well-preserved complex.
2^{†}	Calumet Historic District	Calumet Historic District	March 28, 1989 (#89001097)	Calumet; 47°17′45″N 88°27′14″W	Houghton	Covering the industrial, commercial and residential districts of the Calumet and Hecla Mining Company operating area, Calumet focuses on the influence, innovations and longevity of the Michigan copper industry.
3^{#}	City of Milwaukee (Great Lakes Car Ferry)	City of Milwaukee (Great Lakes Car Ferry)	December 14, 1990 (#90002221)	Manistee; 44°15′34″N 86°18′58″W	Manistee	Between 1931 and 1982, the City of Milwaukee served as a car ferry across Lake Michigan. She is the only pre-1940 Great Lakes car ferry still in existence.
4^{†}	Cranbrook	Cranbrook	June 29, 1989 (#73000954)	Bloomfield Hills; 42°34′23″N 83°14′57″W	Oakland	This idealist educational community was designed to promote learning in an atmosphere of beautiful architecture, and has been called "one of the most important groups of educational and architectural structures in America".
5^{#}	Detroit Industry Murals, Detroit Institute of Arts	Detroit Industry Murals, Detroit Institute of Arts	April 22, 2014 (#14000279)	Detroit; 42°21′34″N 83°03′52″W	Wayne	These four murals at the Detroit Institute of Arts are considered to be the finest remaining work in the United States by renowned Mexican muralist Diego Rivera, and the nation's finest modern, monumental artwork with industrial themes.
6^{#}	Alden Dow House and Studio	Alden Dow House and Studio	June 29, 1989 (#89001167)	Midland; 43°37′22″N 84°15′18″W	Midland	This house and studio were the residence and acknowledged masterpiece of 20th century architect Alden B. Dow. The quality and originality of his work, as well as his association with Frank Lloyd Wright, have earned him lasting national recognition.
7^{#}	Herbert H. Dow House	Herbert H. Dow House	May 11, 1976 (#76001033)	Midland; 43°37′08″N 84°15′10″W	Midland	Between 1899 and 1930 this structure was home to Herbert H. Dow, founder of Dow Chemical Company.
8^{#}	Durant-Dort Carriage Company Office	Durant-Dort Carriage Company Office	June 2, 1978 (#75000943)	Flint; 43°01′03″N 83°41′43″W	Genesee	Between 1895 and 1913, William C. Durant ran his automotive business activities from this office. The Durant-Dort Company was instrumental in the promotion and financing of the carriage and automobile industries, including lending to both Buick and General Motors during their start-up periods.
9^{†}	Edison Institute	Edison Institute	December 21, 1981 (#69000071)	Dearborn; 42°18′17″N 83°13′55″W	Wayne	Henry Ford conceived of the Edison Institute as a way to record the progress of the industrial era. The Henry Ford Museum, opened in 1929, holds an important place in the history of historic preservation and museums, especially outdoor village museums.
10^{#}	USS Edson (Destroyer)	USS Edson (Destroyer)	June 21, 1990 (#90000333)	Bay City; 43°36′50″N 83°52′10″W	Bay	One of two surviving Forrest Sherman-class destroyers; saw action from Vietnam. Relocated to Michigan as museum ship in 2013.
11^{†}	Fair Lane	Fair Lane	November 13, 1966 (#66000399)	Dearborn; 42°18′51″N 83°13′57″W	Wayne	Between 1915 and 1950, this 56-room house was home to the family of Henry Ford. Originally designed by Marion Mahony Griffin in Prairie style, after construction began in 1913 the plans were altered by William H. Van Tine, who added elements of Late English Gothic style.
12^{#}	Fisher Building	Fisher Building	June 29, 1989 (#07000847)	Detroit; 42°22′15″N 83°04′38″W	Wayne	Built in 1927 by the Fisher brothers, this skyscraper is one of the greatest works by architect Albert Kahn. The Fishers intended this building to be a gift to Detroit and one of the most finely detailed major commercial buildings in the United States.
13^{#}	Ford Piquette Avenue Plant	Ford Piquette Avenue Plant	February 17, 2006 (#02000041)	Detroit; 42°22′07″N 83°03′55″W	Wayne	This production plant was the initial factory for the Ford Motor Company. Built in 1904, it was where the original Model T Ford was first designed and produced, and is the factory that earned Henry Ford his position in the American automotive industry.
14^{†}	Ford River Rouge Complex	Ford River Rouge Complex	June 2, 1978 (#78001516)	Dearborn; 42°18′34″N 83°09′44″W	Wayne	This complex, mostly constructed between 1917 and 1927, was where Henry Ford first achieved continuous work flow in the production of automobiles. It is considered "one of the industrial wonders of the world".
15^{#}	Edsel and Eleanor Ford House (Gaukler Pointe)	Edsel and Eleanor Ford House (Gaukler Pointe)	October 31, 2016 (#79001164)	Grosse Pointe Shores; 42°27′21″N 82°52′26″W	Macomb	In 1926, Edsel Ford (the son of Henry Ford and a Ford Motor Company executive) and his wife Eleanor hired Albert Kahn to design a house on the shore of Lake St. Clair in a style resembling that of cottages they had seen in England in the Cotswolds. The site plan and gardens of the estate were designed by Jens Jensen. Construction of the house took a year, but the interior took another two to complete, and the Fords moved in in 1929.
16^{#}	Fort Michilimackinac	Fort Michilimackinac	October 9, 1960 (#66000395)	Mackinaw City; 45°47′11″N 84°44′08″W	Emmet	This fort at the tip of Michigan's lower peninsula was originally constructed by the French, and was later relinquished to the British. During the Revolutionary War it was the only manned British fort on the Great Lakes, and was not abandoned by them until 1781.
17^{#}	Fox Theater (Detroit)	Fox Theater (Detroit)	June 29, 1989 (#85000280)	Detroit; 42°20′16″N 83°03′05″W	Wayne	This flamboyant motion picture house was designed by Howard Crane and constructed in 1928, showcasing an eclectic mix of decoration from several Far East cultures.
18^{#}	General Motors Building	General Motors Building	June 2, 1978 (#78001520)	Detroit; 42°22′09″N 83°04′32″W	Wayne	Completed in 1923, this is the oldest extant headquarters of General Motors in Detroit. This building symbolizes one of the largest manufacturing corporations in the world.
19^{#}	General Motors Technical Center	General Motors Technical Center	August 25, 2014 (#00000224)	Warren; 42°30′48″N 83°02′16″W	Macomb	Eero Saarinen's International Style research center for the automaker was completed in 1955, and opened at a ceremony presided over by President Dwight D. Eisenhower the following year. It has been praised as one of the best industrial buildings of its era.
20^{#}	Grand Hotel	Grand Hotel	June 29, 1989 (#72000637)	Mackinac Island; 45°50′56″N 84°37′33″W	Mackinac	Built in the late 19th century, this white clapboard structure is one of the few extant large wood-framed hotels of the era. Situated on a bluff overlooking Lake Huron, it has been called "the American dream of "a summer place.""
21^{#}	Guardian Building	Guardian Building	June 29, 1989 (#89001165)	Detroit; 42°19′45″N 83°02′46″W	Wayne	Formerly known as the Union Trust building, this 1928 structure was used to portray a friendly atmosphere to customers of the Union Trust Company. As one example in the progression of skyscrapers in the US, it is designed using Arts and Crafts tiles on a steel frame.
22^{#}	Ernest Hemingway Cottage	Ernest Hemingway Cottage	October 18, 1968 (#68000026)	Walloon Lake; 45°16′41″N 84°59′58″W	Emmet	From 1904 to 1921, this structure was the boyhood summer home of author Ernest Hemingway, where he learned to appreciate the outdoors that came to play a major part in his bibliography. Built in 1900, it is a one-story frame building called "Windemere".
23^{#}	Highland Park Ford Plant	Highland Park Ford Plant	June 2, 1978 (#73000961)	Highland Park; 42°24′38″N 83°06′02″W	Wayne	Under construction from 1909 to 1920, the Albert Kahn-designed plant is thought to be the "birthplace of the moving assembly line". Automobile manufacturing operations began in 1910 and continued until 1927, at which point they were moved to the River Rouge Plant, leaving only truck and tractor manufacturing at the Highland Plant.
24^{#}	Lightship No. 103 "HURON"	Lightship No. 103 "HURON"	December 20, 1989 (#76001974)	Port Huron; 42°59′15″N 82°25′36″W	St. Clair	Lightships were used on the Great Lakes to mark dangerous areas not able to be marked by more typical lighthouses. Huron is the only extant ship of her type, and was the last one in service on the Lakes.
25^{†}	Mackinac Island	Mackinac Island	October 9, 1960 (#66000397)	Mackinac Island; 45°52′00″N 84°38′00″W	Mackinac	This island's key role in the early fur trade was secured by its location at the center of the Great Lakes region. Hosting the northern headquarters of John Jacob Astor's American Fur Company until the 1840s, it preserves numerous buildings relating to the fur industry. Its geopolitical importance is illustrated at Fort Mackinac; control of this strategic island was not settled until the 1814 Treaty of Ghent.
26^{†}	Marshall Historic District	Marshall Historic District	July 17, 1991 (#91002053)	Marshall; 42°16′19″N 84°57′51″W	Calhoun	Originally considered for the location of the state capital, Marshall instead became a center of railroad activity and patent medicine production. Originally designed in the 1860s, much of the original architecture, ranging from Federal to Beaux Arts, remains, as does a majority of the original layout.
27^{#}	McGregor Memorial Conference Center	McGregor Memorial Conference Center	February 27, 2015 (#10001023)	Detroit; 42°21′34″N 83°04′15″W	Wayne	Completed in 1958, the McGregor Memorial Conference Center was Minoru Yamasaki's first commission following his trip to Japan and re-envisionment of architectural design. The Center opened to immediate accolades from architectural magazines who called it "delightful" and "refreshing".
28^{#}	Meadow Brook Hall	Meadow Brook Hall	March 2, 2012 (#79001166)	Rochester Hills; 42°40′19″N 83°12′04″W	Oakland	Tudor revival estate of Matilda Dodge Wilson, built in the 1920s. It is one of the nation's largest historic houses.
29^{#}	Michigan State Capitol	Michigan State Capitol	October 5, 1992 (#71000396)	Lansing; 42°44′01″N 84°33′14″W	Ingham	Designed by successful public building architect Elijah E. Myers and constructed between 1872 and 1878, it was the first of many state capitol buildings to be modeled after the US Capitol Building.
30^{†}	Mies van der Rohe Residential District, Lafayette Park	Mies van der Rohe Residential District, Lafayette Park	July 21, 2015 (#96000809)	Detroit; 42°20′22″N 83°01′55″W	Wayne	The largest collection of Mies van der Rohe buildings in the world, exemplifying the International Style
31^{#}	Milwaukee Clipper (Passenger Steamship)	Milwaukee Clipper (Passenger Steamship)	April 11, 1989 (#83003570)	Muskegon; 43°13′19″N 86°17′45″W	Muskegon	This passenger steamship, originally known as Juniata, is one of the oldest on the Great Lakes, having been finished in 1905. After extensive reconstruction in 1940, she was renamed Milwaukee Clipper, although she still carries the original 1905 engines, one of four extant examples of the type.
32^{†}	Minong Copper Mining Historic District	Minong Copper Mining Historic District	January 13, 2021 (#100006259)	West of McCargoe Cove campground 48°04′58″N 88°43′35″W	Keweenaw	The Minong Mine site contains prehistoric copper mining pits, thought to be as old as 4500 years. In addition, the site contains the remains of the Minong Mine, a 19th century copper mine that produced 249 tons of copper over its ten years of existence.
33^{†}	North Manitou Island Lifesaving Station	North Manitou Island Lifesaving Station	August 5, 1998 (#98001191)	Sleeping Bear Dunes National Lakeshore; 45°07′09″N 85°58′39″W	Leelanau	Serving as a Great Lakes lifesaving station from 1854 to 1932, this is the only extant example of the nearly 200 stations that once existed. The stations were volunteer run until 1915, when they became part of the US Coast Guard, and existed to provide aid to victims of shipwrecks.
34^{#}	Norton Mound group	Norton Mound group	December 21, 1965 (#66000396)	Grand Rapids; 42°56′12″N 85°43′19″W	Kent	From ca. 400 B.C. to A.D. 400, this was an important center of Hopewellian culture in the western Great Lakes region, and is considered one of the best-preserved examples in the area. Excavations in the late 1800s and mid-1900s gave insight into the construction of these mounds, and only around half of the original 40 mounds remain today.
35^{#}	Parke-Davis Research Laboratory	Parke-Davis Research Laboratory	May 11, 1976 (#76001039)	Detroit; 42°20′06″N 83°00′52″W	Wayne	Built in 1902, this was the first industrial research laboratory in the US established for the specific purpose of conducting pharmacological research. It inaugurated the commercial pure science approach which has driven the rapid development of pharmaceutical technology. National Park Service staff recommended withdrawal of landmark status in 2002 due to loss of the building's historic integrity during conversion to a hotel.
36^{#}	Pewabic Pottery	Pewabic Pottery	December 4, 1991 (#71000430)	Detroit; 42°21′42″N 82°58′52″W	Wayne	This 1907 building, designed by William Stratton, is the home of ceramic artist Mary Chase Perry Stratton's studio and production facilities. Her work in the Arts and Crafts movement raised the artistic standard of American pottery, and is featured architecturally or curatorially in numerous prominent buildings and distinguished institutions.
37^{†}	Quincy Mining Company Historic District	Quincy Mining Company Historic District	February 10, 1989 (#89001095)	Hancock; 47°08′07″N 88°34′33″W	Houghton	This historic district, centered around the Quincy Mining Company's activities, showcases the US copper industry from the mid-1800s through 1920. Many facets of company towns, mining technology and ethnic settlement are represented.
38^{#}	Badger (Car Ferry)	Badger (Car Ferry)	January 20, 2016 (#09000679)	Ludington; 43°56′57″N 86°27′04″W	Mason	The last Great Lakes rail ferry built, and the last in operation, with the only surviving operational Skinner Unaflow steeple compound engines.
39^{#}	St. Clair River Tunnel	St. Clair River Tunnel	April 19, 1993 (#70000684)	Port Huron; 42°57′29″N 82°25′59″W	St. Clair	This tunnel represents a major advancement in railroad technology; when completed in 1891 it was the first sub-aqueous tunnel in North America that was designed for full-size trains. This advancement in construction technology allowed the creation of under-river tunnels that overcame the difficulties of building railway bridges over wide rivers.
40^{#}	St. Ignace Mission	St. Ignace Mission	October 9, 1960 (#66000398)	St. Ignace; 45°52′11″N 84°44′38″W	Mackinac	Now a park, this was the location of a mission established by French priest Jacques Marquette, and the site of his burial in 1677. A second mission was established at a different site in 1837, and moved to St. Ignace in 1954.
41^{#}	St. Marys Falls Canal	St. Marys Falls Canal	November 13, 1966 (#66000394)	Sault Ste. Marie; 46°30′11″N 84°21′17″W	Chippewa	The original canal of the Soo Locks, the 1855 construction allowed passage for ships between Lake Superior and Lake Huron. This allowed resources to be moved from the Upper Peninsula of Michigan to commerce centers in the Lower Peninsula, allowing it to be considered one of the "most successful waterways constructed during the ante-bellum era".
42^{#}	USS Silversides (Submarine)	USS Silversides (Submarine)	January 14, 1986 (#72001566)	Muskegon; 43°13′47″N 86°19′58″W	Muskegon	Having sunk a confirmed total of 23 ships during World War II and been awarded 12 battle stars and a Presidential Unit Citation, the Silversides is the most decorated US submarine still in existence. During the war, she patrolled the Pacific Ocean with the mission of preventing crucial supplies and material from reaching the Japanese.

== NHLs formerly located in Michigan ==
The following Landmarks were located in Michigan at the time they were declared National Historic Landmarks, but have since moved to other states.

	Landmark name	Image	Date designated	Location	County	Description
1^{#}	Columbia (Steamer)	Columbia (Steamer)	July 6, 1992 (#79001171)	Buffalo, New York; 42°51′39″N 78°51′44″W	Erie	This passenger steamship carried passengers to Bois Blanc Island for the Detroit & Windsor Ferry Company, and is one of the last remaining examples of her kind. Designed by Frank E. Kirby, noted naval architect. In September 2015, it was moved to Buffalo, New York, where it is being prepared for an eventual move to the Hudson River.

== Former NHLs in Michigan ==
	Landmark name	Image	Date designated	Date moved or delisted	Locality	County	Description
1^{*}	Lincoln Motor Company Plant	Aerial photograph of extensive building complex, with inset photographs of a ground-level view of a building and the interior of a large warehouse.	June 2, 1978	April 4, 2005	Detroit	Wayne	Henry M. Leland acquired a factory here in 1917 and greatly expanded it in order to produce Liberty Engines as part of the World War I war effort. After the war, Leland used his long and prominent experience with Cadillac to inaugurate the Lincoln line of automobiles. Leland sold his company to Henry Ford in 1922; by 1952 this original Lincoln plant was retired from automotive production. Most of the complex was demolished in 2002–03, leading to withdrawal of its landmark designation.
2^{*}	Reo Motor Car Company Plant	A large building with a sign reading "Diamond Reo – World's Toughest Truck" sign on the roof and industrial surroundings.	June 16, 1978	July 31, 1985	Lansing	Ingham	In his third venture in the automotive industry, and after his departure from the highly successful Oldsmobile, Ransom E. Olds established the Reo Motor Car Company at this plant in 1904. Reo enjoyed early success and was responsible for many innovations in automobile manufacturing, but remained a niche company for most of its existence. The factory complex was demolished in 1980 to make way for site redevelopment, and landmark status was withdrawn in 1985.
3^{*}	SS Ste. Claire		July 6, 1992	December 11, 2023	Detroit	Wayne	Designed by naval architect Frank E. Kirby. Between 1910 and 1991, the Ste. Claire ferried passengers to Bois Blanc Island for the Detroit & Windsor Ferry Company. She was moved to Toledo, Ohio in 2003, but returned to Michigan a few years later and in 2019 is docked at Riverside Marina in Detroit. The ship was delisted as a National Historic Landmark in 2023, but remained on the National Register of Historic Places.

== See also ==
- List of Michigan State Historic Sites
- Detroit Historical Museum
- Michigan History
- List of U.S. National Historic Landmarks by state
- List of National Natural Landmarks in Michigan
