= Horace Caulkins =

American ceramic artist

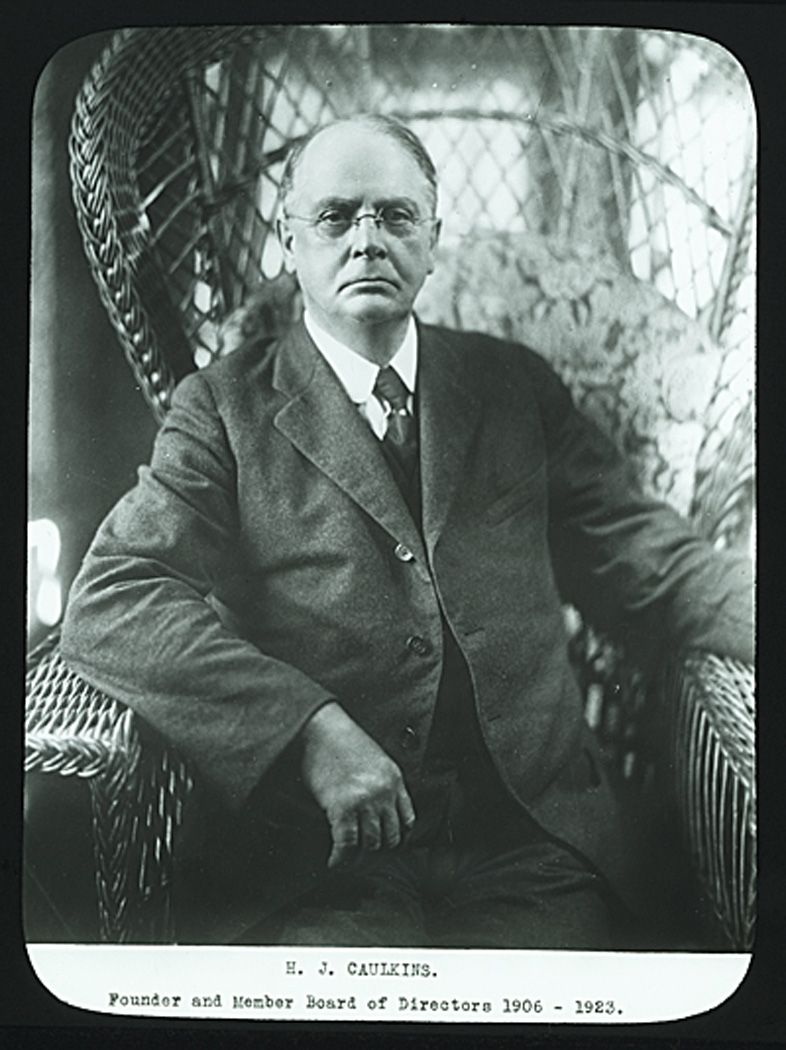
Image of Horace James Caulkins

Horace James Caulkins (c. 1850–1923) was an American ceramic artist living in Detroit, Michigan, he began his career as a dental supplier. In doing this he developed a kiln for firing dental enamel, the products from which were marketed under the trade name of Revelation. In 1903 he formed a partnership with Mary Chase Perry, another ceramic artist, and began using his technology with her understanding of glazes to ceramics, still using the name Revelation. In 1904 the name was changed to Pewabic Pottery.

== Sources ==
- Cameron, Elisabeth, Encyclopedia of Pottery and Porcelain: 1800-1960, Facts On File Publications, New York and London, 1986
