= Pewabic Pottery =

Historic pottery studio in Detroit, Michigan

- U.S. National Register of Historic Places
- U.S. National Historic Landmark
- Michigan State Historic Site
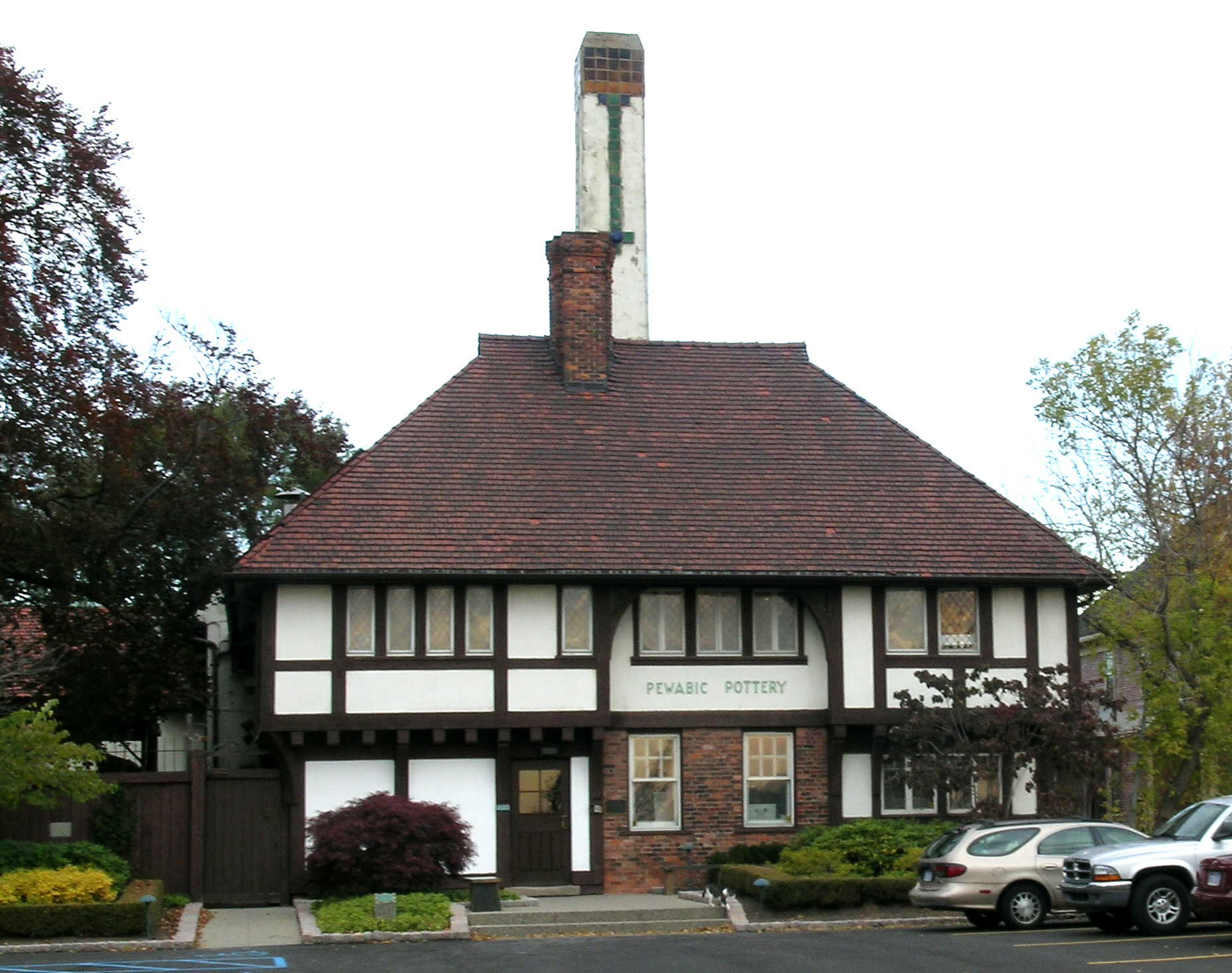
- Interactive map
- Location: 10125 East Jefferson Avenue; Detroit, Michigan
- Coordinates: 42°21′40.92″N 82°58′54.02″W
- Area: less than one acre
- Built: 1908
- Architects: William B. Stratton; Baldwin, Frank D.
- Architectural style: Tudor Revival, Kentish Inn
- NRHP reference No.: 71000430

Significant dates
- Added to NRHP: September 3, 1971
- Designated NHL: December 4, 1991
- Designated MSHS: December 11, 1970

Pewabic Pottery is a ceramic studio and school in Detroit, Michigan. Founded in 1903, the studio is known for its iridescent glazes, some of which grace notable buildings such as the Shedd Aquarium and Basilica of the National Shrine of the Immaculate Conception. The pottery continues in operation today, and was designated a National Historic Landmark in 1991.

== Origin and history ==
The pottery was founded in 1903 by the artist and teacher Mary Chase Perry Stratton and her business partner Horace James Caulkins. Caulkins was considered a high-heat and kiln specialist and developed the "Revelation kiln". Mary Chase Perry Stratton was "the artistic and marketing force." The collaboration of the two and their blend of art and technology gave the pottery its distinctive qualities as Detroit's contribution to the International Arts and Crafts movement and exemplified the American Craftsman Style.

The word Pewabic is derived from the Ojibwa (or Chippewa) word "wabic", which means metal, or "bewabic", which means iron or steel. Stratton's father had worked as a doctor for the Pewabic copper mine in Michigan's Upper Peninsula when she was a girl. The company is well known for the unusual iridescent glaze covering the pottery and tiles created in a manner outlined by the International Arts and Crafts movement.

In 1991, Pewabic Pottery was designated as a National Historic Landmark (see also List of National Historic Landmarks in Michigan). As Michigan's only historic pottery, the center continues to operate in a 1907 Tudor Revival building as a non-profit educational institution. They offer classes in ceramics, hold exhibitions, sell pottery made in house, showcase and sell artists from across the United States, and offer design and fabrication services for public and private buildings.

== Museum and galleries ==
The museum's exhibits focus on the company's role in the history of Detroit, the Arts and Crafts movement in America and the development of ceramic art in the country. The galleries also showcase new works by modern ceramic artists.

== Famous works ==
Pewabic Pottery produces many kinds of hand made decorative objects. They are part of the collections of the Detroit Institute of Arts, the University of Michigan Museum of Art, and the Freer Gallery of Art.

Under Mary Stratton's artistic leadership, Pewabic Pottery employees created lamps, vessels, and architectural tiles. Architectural pieces have been a staple in Pewabic's history. They were known for their iridescent glazes. Architectural tiles were used in churches, concert halls, fountains, libraries, museums, schools and public buildings. The studio's work graces numerous edifices throughout Michigan and the rest of the United States. Noteworthy examples include Herzstein Hall at Rice University in Houston, Texas, and the Shedd Aquarium in Chicago, Illinois. Detailed maps of public installations in the Detroit Metropolitan Area and the U.S.A. are available.

Particularly notable was the company's work at the Basilica of the National Shrine of the Immaculate Conception in Washington, D.C., consisting of arches outlined with iridescent Pewabic tile, huge ceramic medallions set in the ceiling, and fourteen Stations of the Cross for the crypt.

Pewabic's design team continues to create ornate tile conceptions for public and private buildings. Contemporary installations include Comerica Park, home of the Detroit Tigers, Detroit Medical Center Children's Hospital, five Detroit People Mover stations, Third Man Records (Detroit), stations for the Q-Line, and the Herald Square in New York City.

== Architectural tile ==
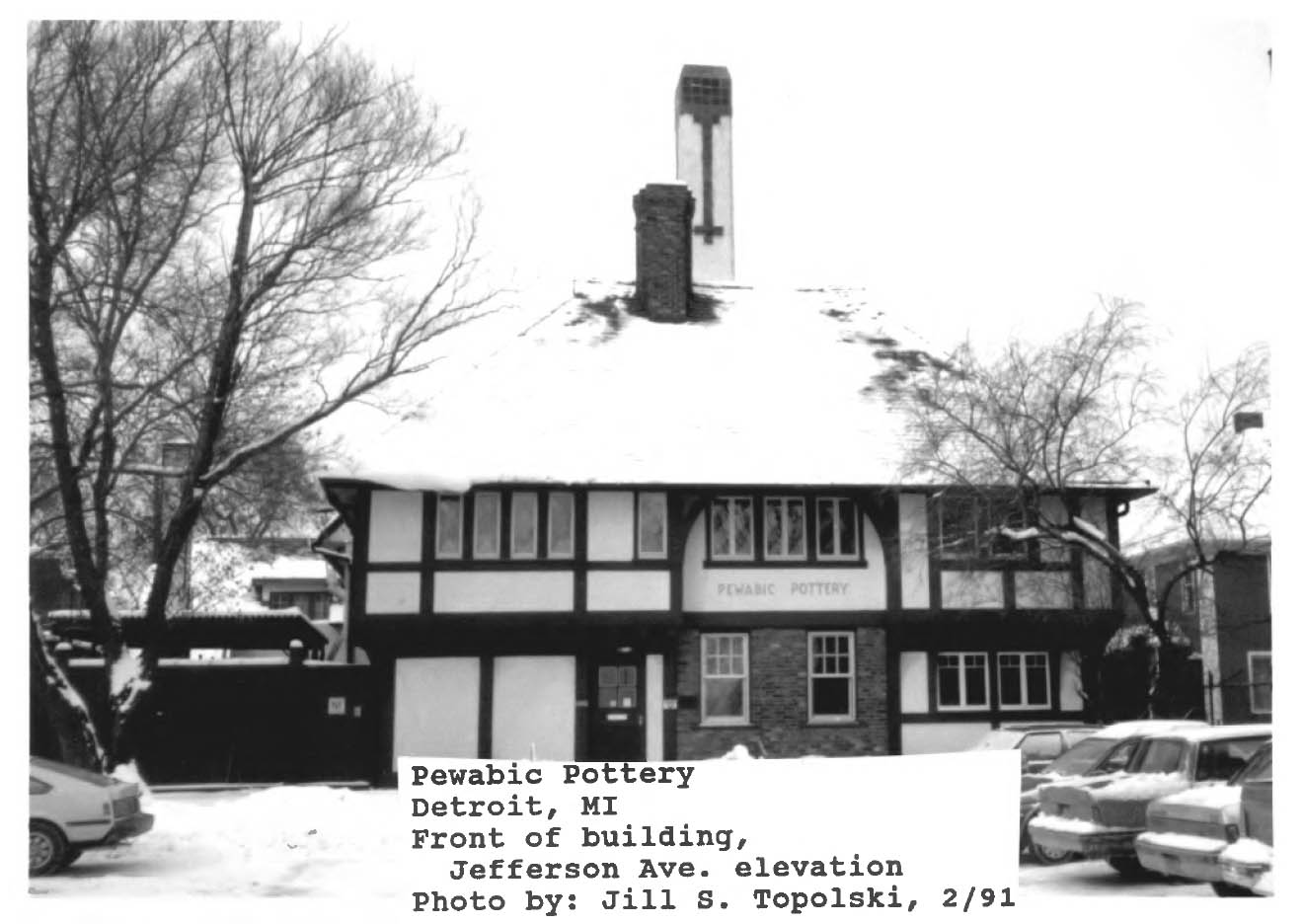
Pewabic Pottery in 1991

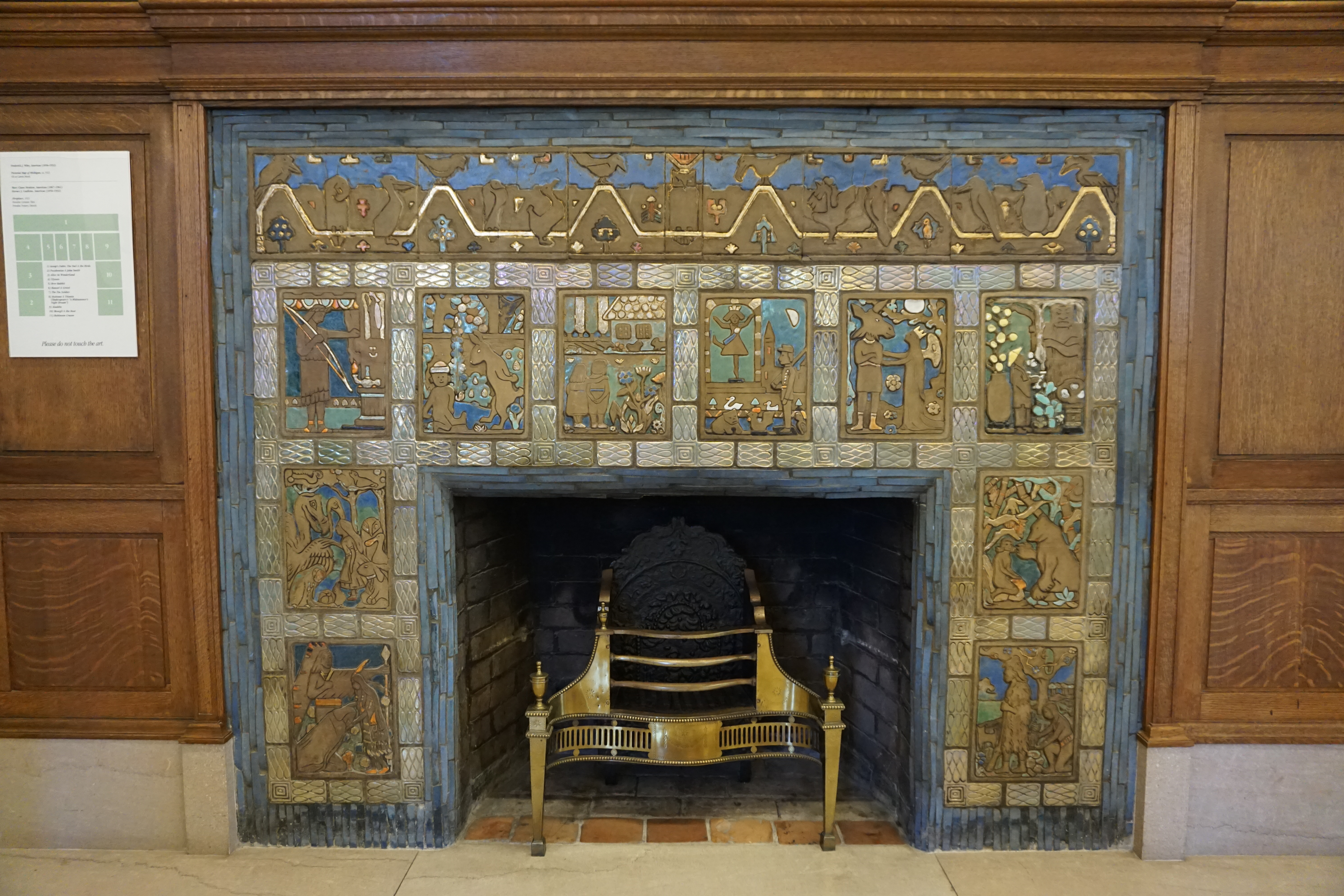
Pewabic fireplace in the HYPE Teen Center (formerly the Children's Room) inside the Detroit Public Library

Pewabic tile was (and continues to be) in great demand in Detroit and the southeastern Michigan area for the use in buildings and it can be found in many of the area's finest structures. These include:

- Cathedral Church of St. Paul, Detroit, Michigan
- Cathedral of the Most Blessed Sacrament, Detroit, Michigan
- Charles Lang Freer House, 71 East Ferry Avenue (Current name: Palmer, Merrill, Institute of Human Development & Family Life) Detroit, Michigan
- Christ Church, Cranbrook, Bloomfield Hills, Michigan
- Clinton-Macomb Public Library, Main Branch, Clinton Township, Michigan
- Compuware World Headquarters, Detroit, Michigan
- Cowles House (a/k/a Alice B. Cowles house, formerly known as Faculty Row House Number 7 and presently the Michigan State University President's home), East Lansing, Michigan
- Cranbrook Kingswood School, many facilities
- Detroit Institute of Arts, Detroit, Michigan (loggia)
- Detroit People Mover many stations, Detroit, Michigan
- Detroit Public Library Children's Room, Detroit, Michigan
- Detroit Receiving Hospital, Detroit, Michigan
- Detroit Zoological Park, Royal Oak, Michigan
- Edward H. McNamara Terminal, Northwest Airlines, Detroit Metropolitan Wayne County Airport, Romulus, Michigan
- English Inn (formerly Medovue Manor), Eaton Rapids, Michigan built in 1927 for Oldsmobile President Irving Jacob Reuter
- Father Solanus Casey Center, Detroit, Michigan
- Guardian Building, Detroit, Michigan.
- Harper House, 1408 Cambridge Drive, Lansing, Michigan
- Hill Auditorium, University of Michigan, Ann Arbor, Michigan
- Kedzie North, Michigan State University, East Lansing, Michigan
- Kirk in the Hills, Bloomfield Hills, Michigan
- Lawrence Fisher Mansion, Detroit, Michigan
- Mackenzie High School, 9275 Wyoming Avenue, Detroit, Michigan (Now at the landfill - demolished)
- Maude Priest School, Detroit, Michigan
- Michigan Historical Museum, Lansing, Michigan
- Michigan League, University of Michigan, Ann Arbor, Michigan
- Michigan Union, University of Michigan, Ann Arbor, Michigan
- Michigan State University Memorial Chapel, East Lansing, Michigan
- Michigan State University Union Women's Lounge (fireplace), East Lansing, Michigan

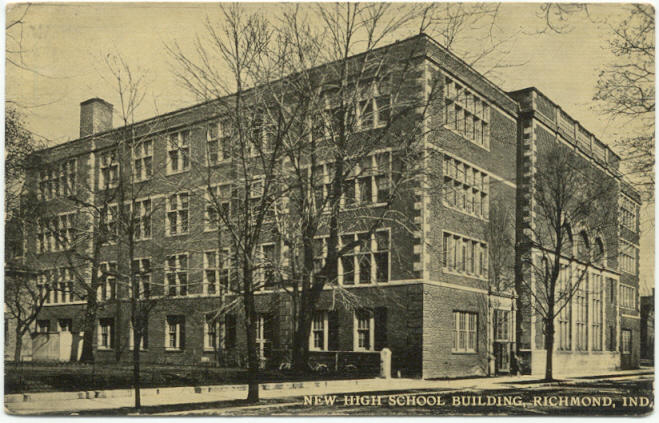
Former Morton High School building, Richmond, Indiana

- Morton High School, Richmond, Indiana
- National Theater, Monroe and Farmer, Detroit, Michigan (facade, 1911)
- North Kedzie Hall, Michigan State University, East Lansing, Michigan
- Oakland Family Services, Pontiac, Michigan
- Sacred Heart Major Seminary, Detroit, Michigan
- Scott Fountain, Belle Isle Park, Detroit, Michigan, 1922
- Shaw Hall, Michigan State University, East Lansing, Michigan
- Southfield Public Library, Southfield, Michigan
- Stephen M. Ross School of Business, University of Michigan, Ann Arbor, Michigan
- Wayne State University David Adamany Undergraduate Library, 5155 Gullen Mall Detroit, MI 48202-3962
- Wayne State University Merrill Palmer Institute, Detroit, Michigan
- Wayne State University, Old Main, Previously, Detroit Central High School, 4841 Cass Detroit, MI 48201
- Women's City Club now Detroit Police Academy, Elizabeth and Park, Detroit, Michigan

Notable structures outside of Michigan that feature Pewabic tiles include:

- Stan Hywet Hall, Akron, Ohio.

== See also ==
- Arts and Crafts movement
- Detroit Yacht Club
- List of National Historic Landmarks in Michigan
- Niloak Pottery
- Pottery
- Rookwood Pottery Company
- Studio pottery
- Tile
- Van Briggle Pottery
- William B. and Mary Chase Stratton House
