= Mary Chase Perry Stratton =

American ceramic artist

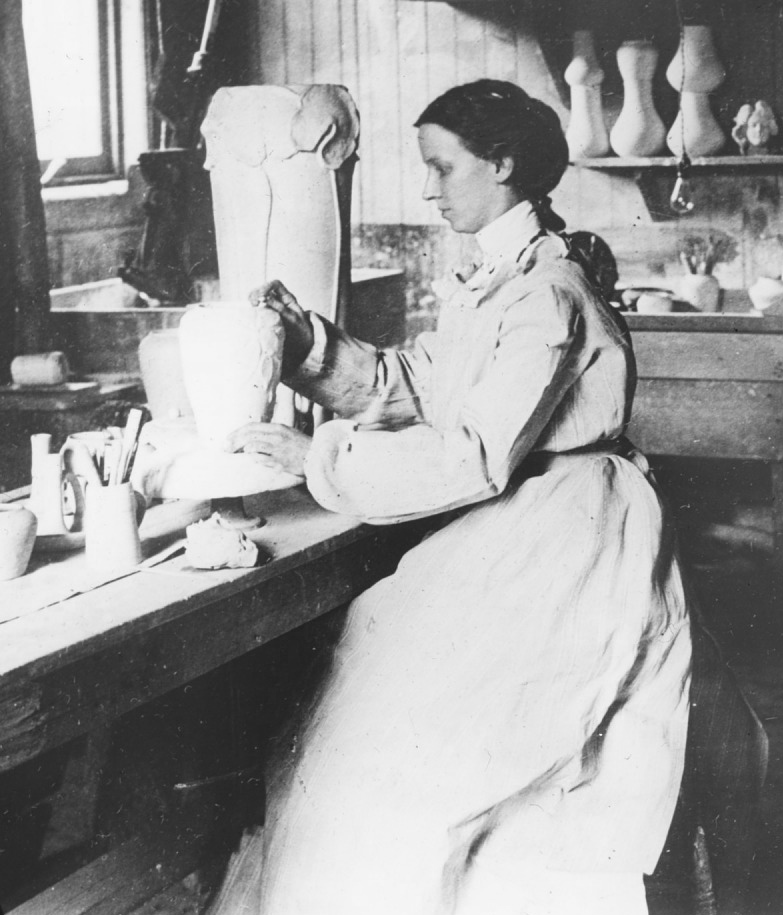
- Perry at Pewabic Pottery, 1905
- Born: Mary Chase Perry; March 15, 1867; Hancock, Michigan
- Died: April 15, 1961 (aged 94)
- Spouse: William Stratton

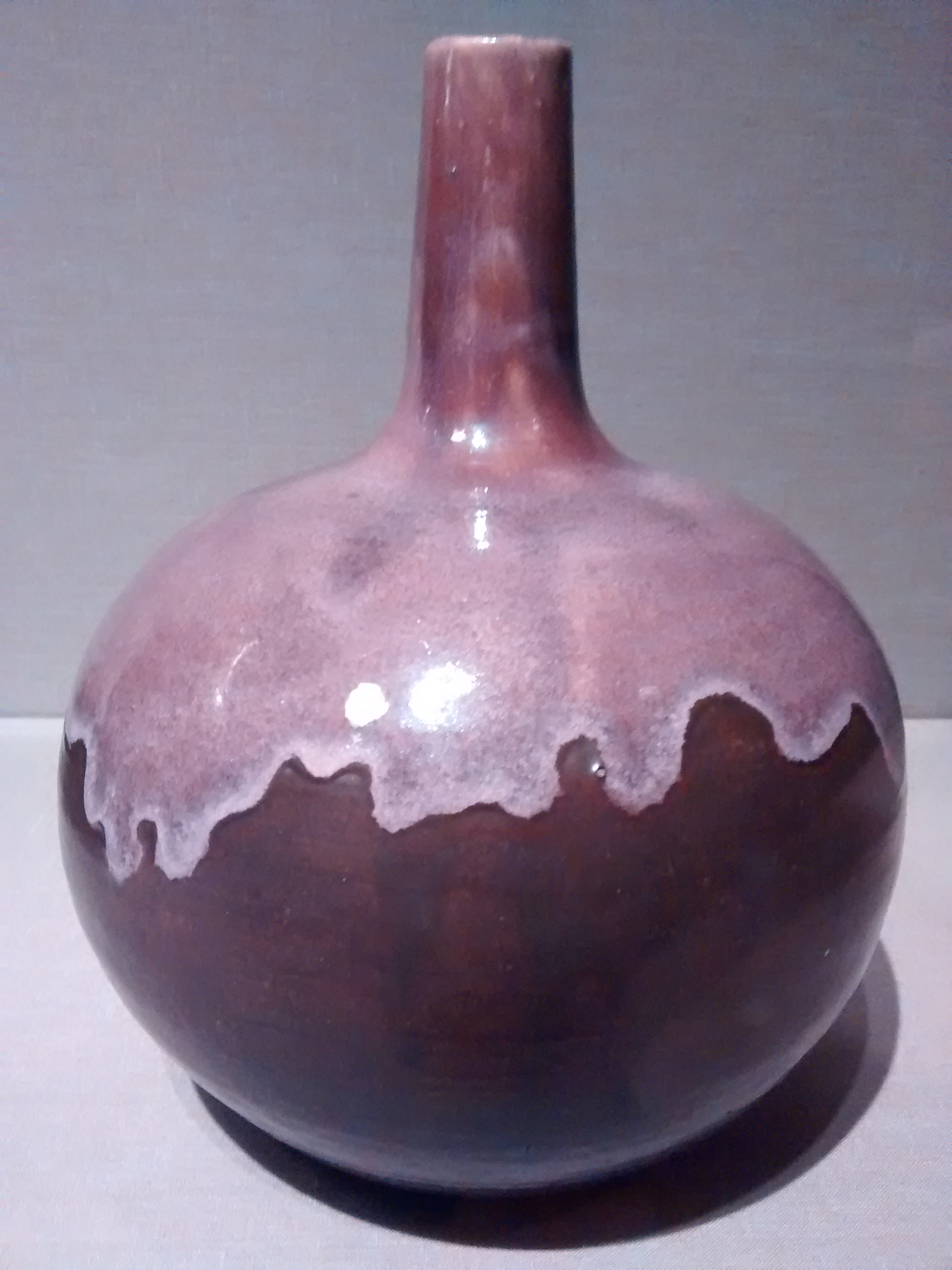
A glazed earthenware bottle by Mary Chase Perry Stratton

Mary Chase Perry Stratton (March 15, 1867 – April 15, 1961) was an American ceramic artist. She was a co-founder, along with Horace James Caulkins, of Pewabic Pottery, a form of ceramic art used to make architectural tiles.

== Biography ==
Stratton was born in Hancock, Michigan, in the Upper Peninsula and later moved with her family to Ann Arbor, following the death of her father, and from there to the Detroit area, when she was in her early teens. There she attended her first art classes at the Art School of the Detroit Museum of Art. She followed that up with two years of studies at the Art Academy of Cincinnati, from 1887 to 1889, where she studied with the regionally important sculptor and educator Louis Rebisso.

Returning to Detroit she founded the Pewabic Pottery, named after an old copper mine (or sometimes, the Indian name of a nearby river) in Michigan's Upper Peninsula, with Caulkins in 1903. In 1907 the enterprise flourished and moved from the Carriage House behind the Ransom Gillis House, on John R Street, to a new building designed by Detroit architect William Stratton located on Jefferson Avenue, where the business still thrives. In 1918, she married William Stratton.

She died on April 15, 1961.

== Legacy ==
Under her leadership, Pewabic Pottery produced architectural tiles, lamps and vessels. The Pewabic Pottery became known far and wide for its iridescent glazes, and was used in churches, libraries, schools, and public buildings. New York architects McKim, Meade & White asked her to create the tiles for the roof garden of the Hotel Pennsylvania. Her work can be seen in Detroit at the Cathedral Church of St. Paul, the crypt church of the Basilica of the National Shrine of the Immaculate Conception, the Fisher Building, and Eliel Saarinen's Kingswood School for Girls.

Pewabic Pottery is Michigan's only historic pottery. It is designated a National Historic Landmark.

Stratton established the ceramics department at the University of Michigan and taught there. She taught also at Wayne State University. In 1947, she received the highest award in the American ceramic field, namely the Charles Fergus Binns Medal.

Her art was exhibited at the Detroit Art Club in 1995. She was a charter member of the Detroit Society of Women Painters and Sculptors.

Today Pewabic Pottery offers classes, workshops, lectures, and internships for potters of all ages.

== See also ==
- Arts and Crafts Movement
- Ceramic tile
- Studio pottery
