= Bertha Gilkey =

Public housing activist

- Gilkey in 1987
- Born: Bertha Knox; March 18, 1948; Round Pound, Arkansas, U.S.
- Died: May 25, 2014 (aged 66); Prattville, Alabama, U.S.
- Occupation: Activist
- Known for: Activist of tenant management of public housing developments in urban cities.
- Spouses: Emmett Gilkey (m. 1965; div. 1969) Robert Bonds (m. 1998)
- Children: 2
- Awards: Essence Award (1992)

Bertha Gilkey (née Knox; March 18, 1948 – May 25, 2014) was an African-American activist of tenant management of public housing properties. She set up the first tenant management association in St. Louis, Missouri, which successfully rehabilitated the once decrepit Cochran Gardens public housing project, and managed it for more than 20 years.

== Early life ==
According to her own statement, Gilkey was born in bitter poverty in Arkansas. Emma Green, her mother, relocated to St. Louis in 1960 and raised her fifteen children in a three-bedroom apartment at Cochran Gardens - the first high-rise project of Saint-Louis financed through the Housing Act of 1949, completed in 1953. Initially intended for low-income whites, the 704-unit block was desegregated in 1956. Emma Green and her children were among its first black tenants.

When Cochran was all white, they didn't refer to it as a project. It was called Cochran Gardens. As Cochran became more and more black, I began to see the services reduced. Once it became all black, there was no standards. It moved from being a neighborhood to a project. It became a dumping ground.

— Bertha Gilkey, 1999

== Activism ==
In 1969, Gilkey, then a 21-year-old divorced mother of two who called herself a Black Panther led a nine-month rent strike of some twenty-two thousand public housing tenants against mismanagement of municipal agencies and the intolerable living conditions of St. Louis highrise ghettoes—Pruitt–Igoe, Cochran Gardens and the like. The city replaced its Housing Authority board, and after six more years of activism Bertha Gilkey succeeded in persuading the city of St. Louis to surrender management of Cochran Gardens, to an independent tenant management association. By this time, Pruitt–Igoe had already been torn down and Cochran Gardens, nicknamed "Little Nam", had already been slated for demolition. Her mother, ex-husband and siblings eventually left Cochran for better places, but Gilkey preferred to stay.

=== Cochran Tenant Management Corporation ===
The Cochran Tenant Management Corporation became the first of its kind in St. Louis. In a short time the new management rehabilitated Cochran Gardens into a relatively safe and comfortable place. Since 1978 the complex was modernized and outfitted with new engineering systems, owing both to Gilkey's fundraising skills and to Cochran's nearly downtown location that could not be ignored by city and federal authorities. By 1992 Cochran received $33 million in federal aid, twice as much as the second-ranking St. Louis project. Gilkey personally managed the staff that reached 47 in 1991; only at this point did Gilkey hire a professional manager and accountant to run the operations. She was not ever paid a salary at Cochran (according to a 1992 source), making a living with consultancies and paid public speaking. Her experience fell in accord with the Republican campaign for deregulation and changing the rules of welfare administration. Gilkey, among other activists, was invited to join Ronald Reagan as he signed the Housing and Community Development Act of 1987:

Joining me are three of our national heroes of the tenant management movement: Kimi Gray, of the Kenilworth-Parkside Resident Management Corporation here in Washington, DC; Bertha Gilkey, of the Cochran Tenant Management Corporation in St. Louis; and Mildred Hailey, the founder of the tenant management movement at the Bromley-Heath Tenant Management Corporation in Boston. And they remind us that ownership or control of one's own residence should be an opportunity for every citizen.

— Ronald Reagan, February 5, 1988.

Jack Kemp, Housing Secretary under George H. W. Bush, regularly cited Gilkey in an honor roll of civil rights heroes, alongside Abraham Lincoln, saying that tenant property management is "one of the most powerful manifestations of revolutionary ideals since 1776."

President George H. W. Bush visited Cochran Gardens in May 1991, commending tenant management and personally Betha Gilkey and attacking "government bureaucracy" and the "solutions of the 1960s". Federal supporters of tenant management did not publicize the fact that most of Cochran residents remained poor and lived on welfare throughout the decades of Gilkey's tenure.

In 1990, 85% of households were headed by single women, only 27% of heads of households had jobs. Vacancy in 1990 was on par with St. Louis average of 25%. Gang wars with drive-by shootings resumed in Cochran in September 1991, prompting Gilkey to lead a public violence awareness campaign. In 1998, city authorities took over Cochran Gardens, citing tax mismanagement by the tenant association. The buildings, rapidly deteriorated under city management; by 1999, the vacancy rate increased from under 10% to one-third and by the end of 2008 all but one of Cochran Gardens buildings have been demolished.

== Television/Chicago and death ==
As the co-chair of the New York-based National Congress of Neighborhood Women Gilkey negotiated for government grants helping establishment of tenant management in New York and other cities. She was the subject of a 1993 NBC show Fired Up! The Bertha Gilkey Story produced by John Singleton. Gilkey played a prominent role in an attempt by the Metropolitan Planning Council in Chicago to implement Tenant Management in Chicago as documented in a 60-minute documentary, Fired-Up: Public Housing Is My Home directed by James R. Martin. The film was seen nationally on Public Television in 1989–90.

Gilkey died on May 25, 2014, at the age of 66 due to a two-year battle with cancer in Prattville, Alabama.

== See also ==
- Cochran Gardens, in St. Louis, Missouri
