= Cochran Gardens =

Demolished public housing complex

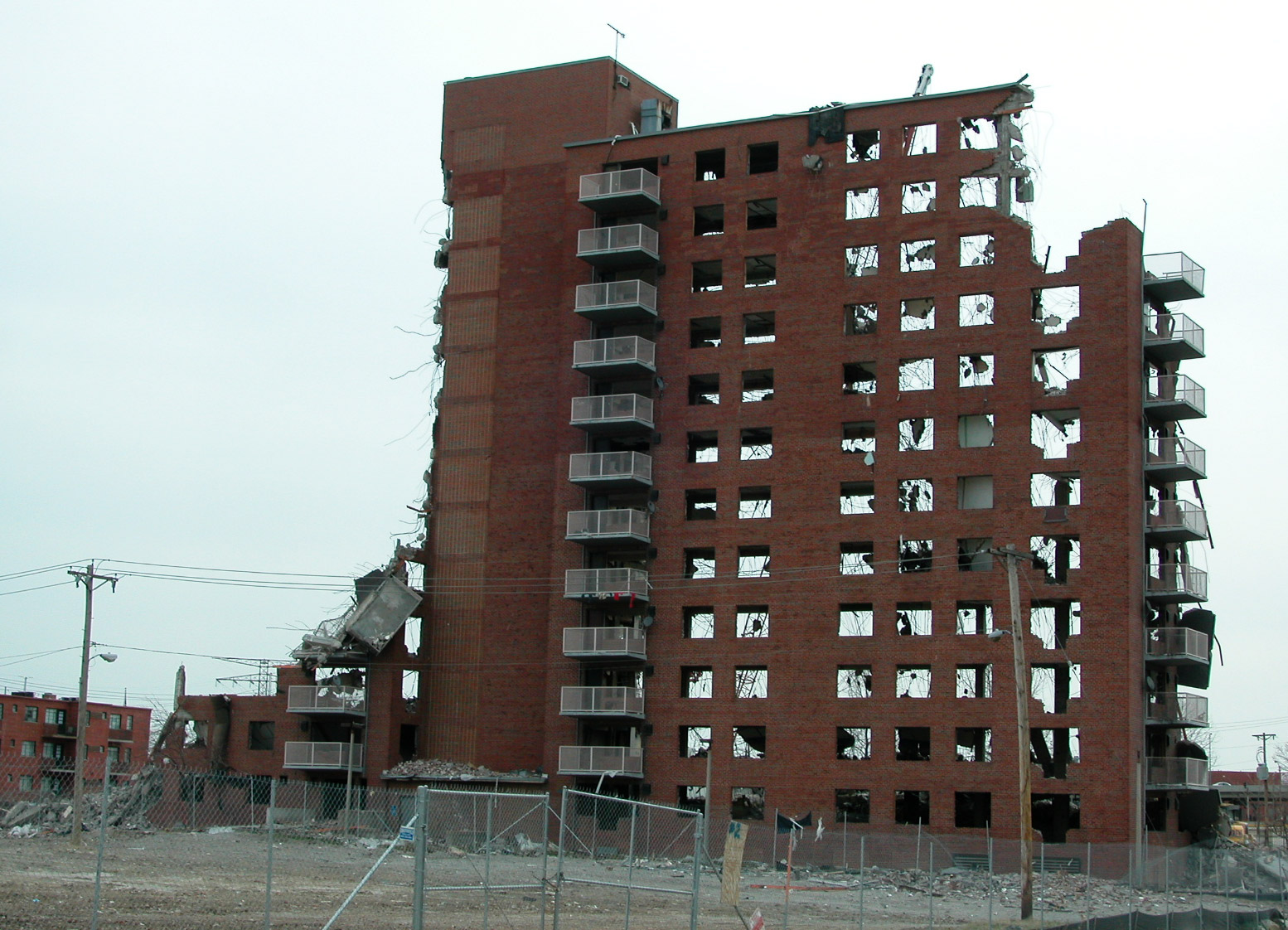
- Cochran Gardens (part-demolished) in 2008
- Interactive map of Cochran Gardens

General information
- Location: St. Louis, Missouri, U.S.
- Coordinates: 38.6373°N 90.1901°W

Construction
- Constructed: 1953; 73 years ago
- Contractors: Leinweber, Yamasaki & Hellmuth

Listing
- Demolished: 2008; 18 years ago

Other information
- Famous residents: Bertha Gilkey

Cochran Gardens was a public housing complex on the near north side of downtown St. Louis, Missouri. Construction was completed in 1953. The complex was occupied until 2006. It was famous for its residents' innovative form of tenant-led management. In 1976, Cochran Gardens became one of the first U.S. housing projects to have tenant management.

== History ==
Built by the same firm, Leinweber, Yamasaki & Hellmuth, as the infamous Pruitt–Igoe complex, Cochran Gardens was more successful than its ill-fated sister project. In the mid 1970s, Bertha Gilkey and a group of friends successfully led a community driven rehabilitation effort; in 1976 she won a property management contract from the city. Independent management improved Cochran Gardens and created small business jobs in the neighborhood. President George H. W. Bush visited the site in 1991, commending tenant management and Bertha Gilkey. However, in 1998 city authorities took over Cochran Gardens, citing tax mismanagement by the tenant association. The buildings rapidly deteriorated. By 1999 vacancy rate increased from under 10% to one-third.

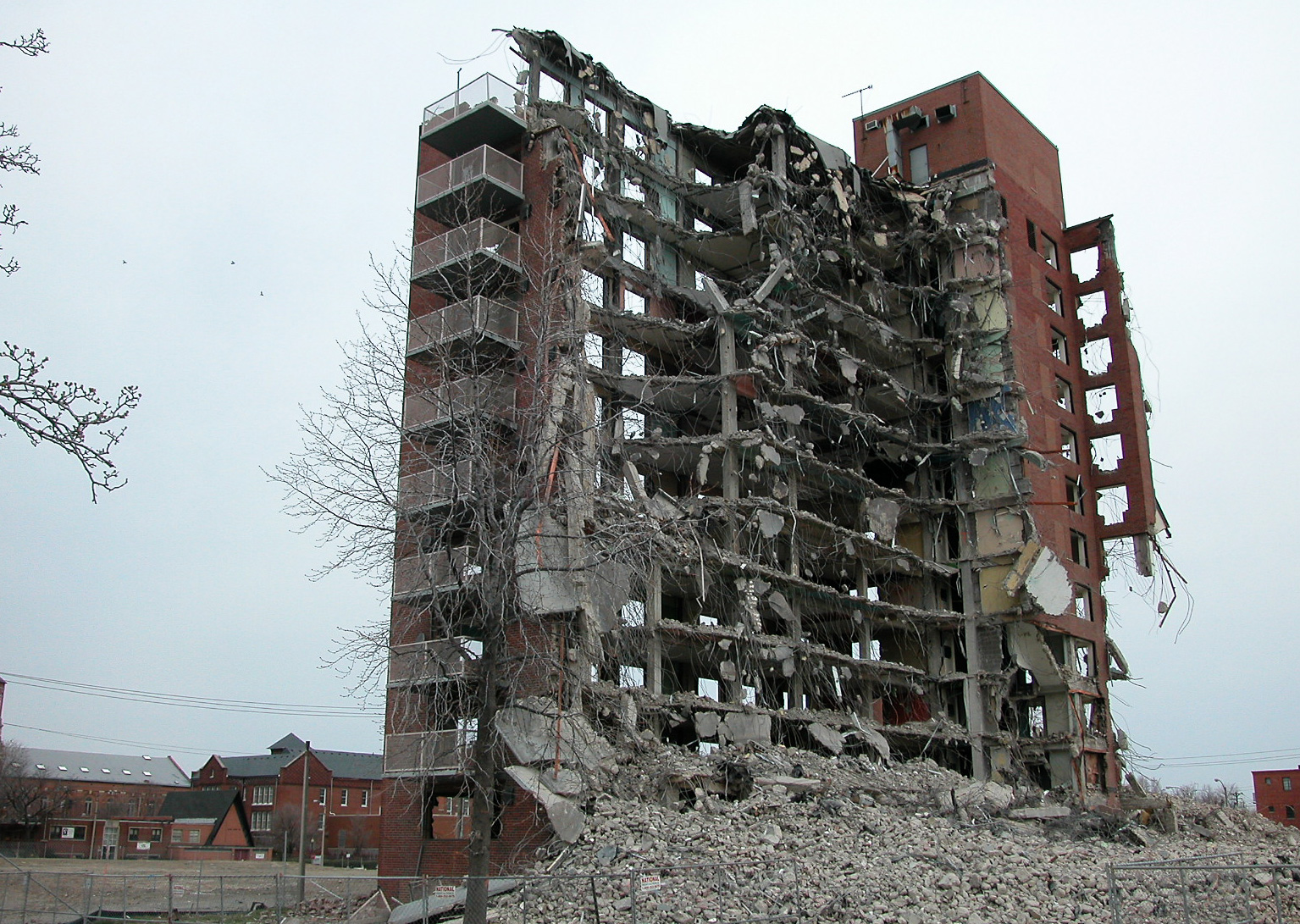
Another angle of the demolition in progress

Cochran Gardens, which survived into the 21st century, was demolished in 2008.

== See also ==
- Cabrini–Green Homes, in Chicago, Illinois
- Robert Taylor Homes, in Chicago, Illinois
- St. James Town, in Toronto, Canada
- Ballymun Flats, in Dublin, Ireland
- Red Road (flats), in Glasgow, United Kingdom
- Hulme Crescents, in Manchester, United Kingdom
- Panel house, in various communist countries
