= The Pruitt-Igoe Myth =

The Pruitt-Igoe Myth: An Urban History
- Directed by: Chad Freidrichs
- Written by: Chad Freidrichs; Jaime Freidrichs
- Produced by: Paul Fehler; Chad Freidrichs; Jaime Freidrichs; Brian Woodman
- Release date: February 11, 2011 (Oxford Film Festival)
- Running time: 79 minutes
- Country: United States
- Language: English
- Box office: $44,683

The Pruitt-Igoe Myth is a 2011 documentary film detailing the history of the Pruitt–Igoe public housing complex in St. Louis, Missouri, and the eventual decision to raze the entire complex in 1976.

The documentary argues that the violent social collapse within the Pruitt–Igoe complex was not due to the modernist principles behind the project's architecture and planning, but was a result of wider, external social forces, namely the declining economic fortunes of St. Louis, the resulting impact upon employment opportunities, and the project's failure to meet occupancy projections from the start and therefore to meet monthly income projected to cover maintenance costs. Furnaces made to incinerate garbage failed, pipes/plumbing failed, and more issues kept on to the point residents stopped paying rent.

== Synopsis ==
The film begins with a former resident of the Pruitt–Igoe public housing complex returning to the site of the buildings in the north side of St. Louis, and noting that in spite of the decades since the planned demolition of the buildings, the site remains largely vacant. It continues by detailing the decision by the city to replace 19th century tenement housing with high-rise public housing, ultimately designed by Minoru Yamasaki (later the famed designer of the World Trade Center) in the modernist style as thirty-three 11-floor buildings.

Interviews with former residents, archival images, and film are used to tell first impressions about moving into Pruitt–Igoe and the steady deterioration of living conditions during the 1960s and early 1970s before the destruction by planned implosion between 1972 and 1976.

The film takes issue with the various explanations for the failure of the Pruitt–Igoe complex that have developed since its demolition, including that it was the fault of the modernist theory of architecture itself (an explanation developed by architectural historian Charles Jencks) or of the general concept of public housing.

Instead, the explanation offered is that the fate of the Pruitt–Igoe project was determined by the declining population and industrial base in St. Louis after World War II. The documentary argues that this process left few jobs for the remaining residents, thus reducing funds available for maintenance and security of the buildings, which were planned to be paid for by tenant rents even as residents grew poorer and the living conditions in the project deteriorated.

== Reception ==
The Pruitt-Igoe Myth has a rating of 89% on Rotten Tomatoes based on 19 reviews, and a rating of 70 (out of 100) on Metacritic based on 8 reviews. It was nominated for a Satellite Award in 2012 in the category of Best Documentary Film. It also won the International Documentary Association's ABC News VideoSource Award for best use of archival footage.

== See also ==
- Pruitt–Igoe
- Urban decay
- History of St. Louis (1905–80)
