= Taro Yamasaki =

American photojournalist (born 1945)

- 山崎 太郎
- Born: Taro Michael Yamasaki; 19 December 1945 (age 80); Detroit, Michigan, U.S.
- Occupation: Photographer
- Children: 3
- Awards: Pulitzer Prize (1981)

Taro Michael Yamasaki (Japanese: 山崎 太郎, Hepburn: Yamasaki Taro; born 19 December 1945) is an American photographer who won the 1981 Pulitzer Prize for Feature Photography while working for the Detroit Free Press. He is the eldest son of architect Minoru Yamasaki.

== Early life ==
Taro Yamasaki was born on December 19, 1945, to Minoru Yamasaki and Teruko Hirashiki in Detroit, Michigan. He is the second of three children. His father, an architect, is best known for designing the World Trade Center; his mother was a pianist who attended the Juilliard School. He attended high school at Cranbrook School in Bloomfield Hills, Michigan. When his younger brother built a darkroom in their mother's house, Yamasaki began to experiment with photography. Taro was admitted to the University of Michigan in Ann Arbor where he majored in Journalism. He began taking photographs for the Journalism department's newspaper.

== Career ==
Yamasaki dropped out of the University of Michigan in the spring of his senior year and in April 1968 moved to New York City where he embarked on a string of jobs including assistant kindergarten teacher and assistant to fashion photographer William Klein. He took a position at a Community Action Program as a documentary photographer in migrant farm worker camps in western New York State where he realized that he wanted to pursue photography more seriously.

In the summer of 1971, Yamasaki moved from New York city to Denver, Colorado, with his first wife, Anne. He worked as a taxi driver to support his family. He and Anne moved again in 1973 back to Michigan.

== 1981 Pulitzer Prize for Feature Photography ==
In Michigan, Yamasaki founded a carpentry company but quit the business in 1977 to work as a staff photographer at the Detroit Free Press. He was hired by chief photographer Tony Spina and eventually worked alongside David C. Turnley. While at the Free Press, Yamasaki asked for permission to create, research and produce his own stories. The first story he conceived of on his own was a documentation of the daily lives of inmates in Jackson Prison, the largest walled prison in the world with 52 acres inside the walls. He then produced a lead story he had written, researched and photographed entirely on his own titled, "Jackson Prison: Armed and dangerous". The story was published on Sunday, December 14, 1980, as lead story of Free Press' Sunday Comment Front. Yamasaki had "spent 10 days talking to the prison warden, officials, guards and inmates." His writing focused on the inhumane conditions in which the inmates lived and the problems of overcrowding, violence and contraband. Against the prison's rules, Yamasaki was able to convince the guards not to escort him anywhere and gained permission to travel almost everywhere inside the prison entirely on his own. According to Yamasaki, the guards allowed him to do this because they wanted him to portray the great danger of their jobs as accurately as possible. Because Yamasaki traveled around the prison without guards, he was able to gain the trust of the inmates who confided things to him they otherwise would not have, in many cases, because they wanted him to portray the incredible danger and inhumanity of their lives as honestly as possible. Despite the danger he faced from the inmates without the protection of prison guards, Yamasaki was able to produce an in-depth investigative report which the Detroit Free Press nominated for the Pulitzer Prize. Subsequently, Yamasaki won the 1981 Pulitzer Prize for feature photography for the photographs he had taken inside Jackson Prison.

Yamasaki has won numerous other awards for his photojournalism work. In 1999 and 2000, he was a Distinguished Visiting Artist at The University of Michigan School of Art and Design.

== Other work ==
In 1983 Yamasaki took a leave of absence from the Free Press to work on a book of architectural photography for Herring Press on notable buildings that were built out of travertine from a quarry near Tivoli. During this year, he began receiving different magazine assignments from different Time Inc. magazines. He got an assignment from People magazine to travel to Wales to photograph the village in which Richard Burton was born. After returning from the assignment, he resigned from the Free Press and became a freelance magazine photojournalist.

Yamasaki has completed hundreds of human interest stories for Time Inc. magazines such as Time, Life, Sports Illustrated, Forbes, Fortune, Money, Men's Journal and People. "Often his subjects have been children, living with the threats of poverty, disease, natural disasters, and armed conflict."

Some of the topics his documentary photography work have covered are:

- Children Victims of the war in Nicaragua
- Romanian orphans
- Refugees during the Bosnian War
- Three cover stories on Ryan White, a thirteen-year-old who had contracted AIDS, considered instrumental on substantially increasing awareness of people living with AIDS.
- Rwanda (as the first Westerners to enter the country after the Rwandan Civil War in 1995)
- The lives of children caught in the Israeli-Palestinian conflict
- Outside notorious serial-killer Jeffrey Dahmer's apartment shortly after he was arrested in 1991.

== Personal life ==
Yamasaki's first marriage ended in divorce in 1974. He has one daughter from that marriage. He married his second and current wife, Susan Waderlow, in 1978. Together, they have two boys. He has four grandchildren. Yamasaki resides in Leelanau County, Michigan.
