= Yamasaki & Associates =

American architectural firm (1955–2009)

Yamasaki Associates, Inc.
- Type: Private
- Industry: Architecture
- Predecessor: None
- Founded: 1955; 71 years ago
- Founder: Minoru Yamasaki
- Defunct: 2009
- Fate: Dissolved
- Successor: Yamasaki Inc.
- Headquarters: 900 Tower Drive, Suite 190, Troy, Michigan, U.S.
- Number of locations: Dubai - satellite office
- Area served: United States, Europe, Middle East, Asia, South America
- Key people: Minoru Yamasaki (Founder); Ted Ayoub (CEO); Lee Yesh (CFO)
- Services: Architecture, design, interior architecture, planning, programming, site analysis, space planning, master planning, project management, cost management
- Revenue: $5-10 million
- Number of employees: 100 (2007); 20 (2009)
- Website: www.yamasakiarchitects.com

Yamasaki Associates, Inc. (also as Minoru Yamasaki Associates, Inc. before 1986) was an architectural firm based in Troy, Michigan. Its founder, Minoru Yamasaki, was well known for his design of the Twin Towers (towers 1 and 2) of the World Trade Center.

== History ==
Minoru Yamasaki arrived in Detroit in 1945 from New York City and briefly worked for the firm Smith, Hinchman & Grylls. In 1949, he and two other associates from the firm (Joseph Leinweber and George F. Hellmuth) formed Leinweber, Yamasaki & Hellmuth. Some of their most notable designs included the terminal building at St. Louis Lambert International Airport and the Pruitt-Igoe public housing complexes. In 1955, Yamasaki formed his own firm: Yamasaki & Associates.

The firm has designed an eclectic variety of buildings throughout its history including high rise office buildings, buildings on college campuses, municipal buildings, places of worship as well as smaller businesses and private homes. Some of the firm's known houses of worship include the synagogues Temple Beth El in the Detroit suburb of Bloomfield Hills and North Shore Congregation Israel in the Chicago area.

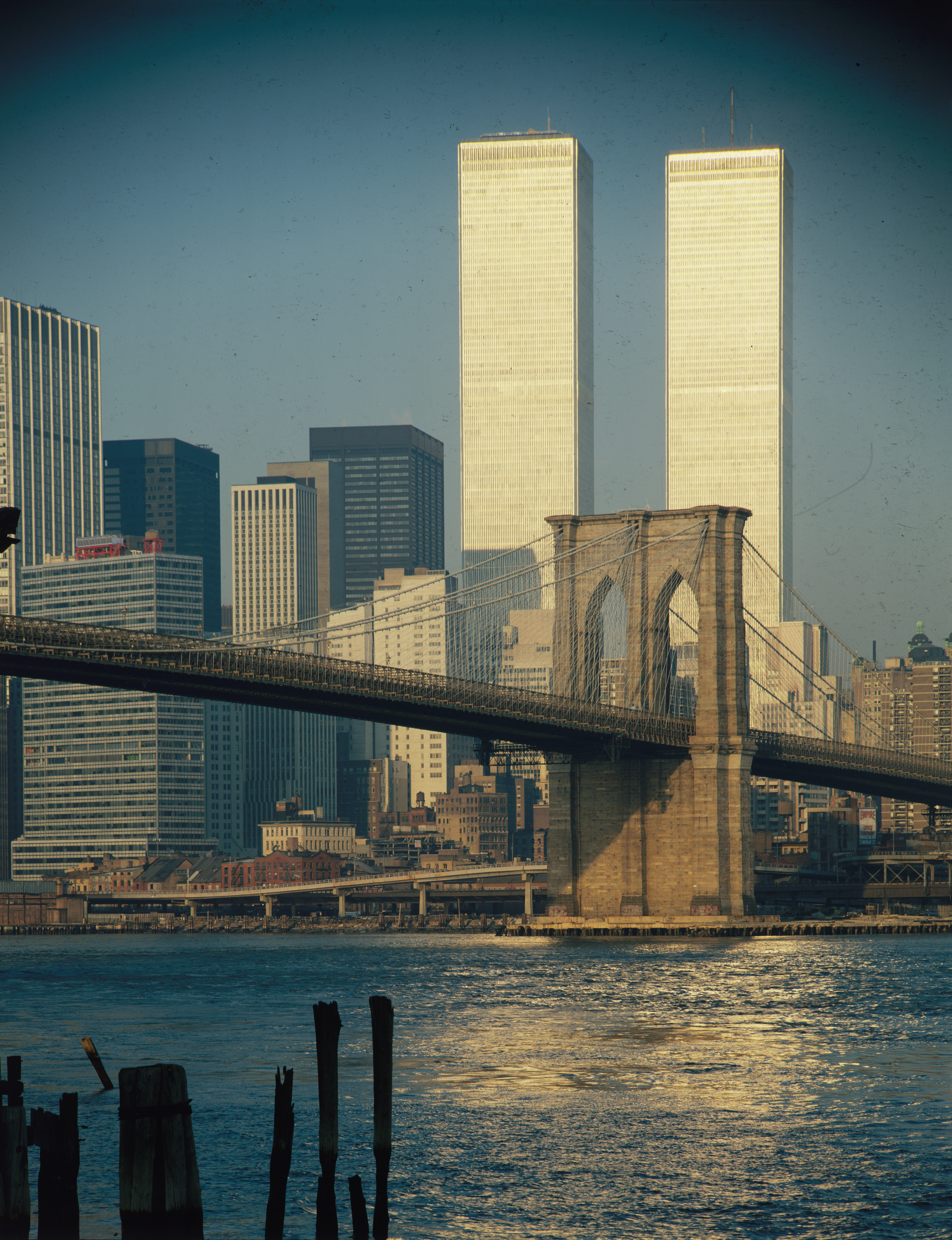
World Trade Center Twin Towers with Brooklyn Bridge in foreground in 1976

The firm is best known for building the original World Trade Center, which was subsequently destroyed in the September 11 attacks. After the construction of the World Trade Center, the firm achieved more global popularity and designed buildings throughout the world including overseas projects in Azerbaijan, Brazil, China, India, South Korea, Spain and Turkey.

Facing financial problems due to the Great Recession, the firm laid off the last of its employees on December 31, 2009, and ceased operations in January 2010.

=== After dissolution ===
In the 2010s, a former employee of Yamasaki, Robert Szantner bought the intellectual property of the company and opened a successor company called Yamasaki Inc. that operates in the Metro Detroit area. In 2017 Yamasaki Inc. moved to the Fisher Building in Detroit.
