= Prentis Building and University Auditorium Complex =

- Prentis Building and DeRoy Auditorium Complex
- U.S. National Register of Historic Places
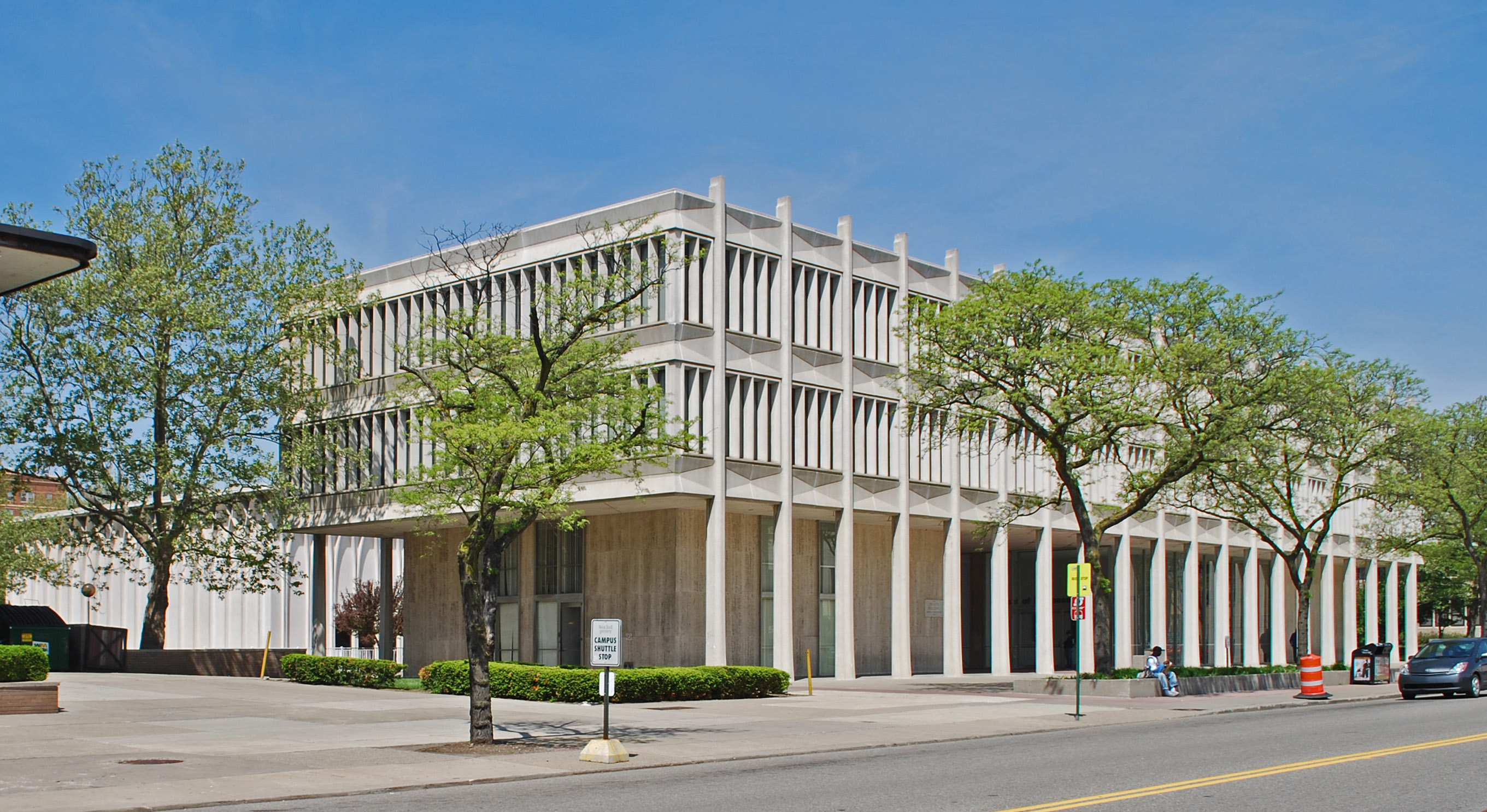
- View from Cass Avenue. Prentis Building is on right; the University Auditorium is behind and to the left.
- Interactive map
- Location: 5201, 5203 Cass Avenue; Detroit, Michigan
- Coordinates: 42°21′28″N 83°4′6″W
- Built: 1962-1964
- Architect: Minoru Yamasaki
- Architectural style: International Style
- NRHP reference No.: 11000222
- Added to NRHP: May 3, 2011

The Prentis Building and University Auditorium Complex consists of two educational buildings, the Meyer and Anna Prentis Building and the University Auditorium (formerly the DeRoy Auditorium), located respectively at 5201 and 5203 Cass Avenue in Midtown Detroit, Michigan, on the campus of Wayne State University. The buildings were built at the same time, and were designed by architect Minoru Yamasaki to interrelate functionally, spatially, and architecturally. The buildings were constructed at a critical point in Yamasaki's career when he was experimenting with ornamentation, light and shadow, and the use of pools and gardens to soften perception of standard International Style architecture. The complex was listed on the National Register of Historic Places in 2011.

== History ==
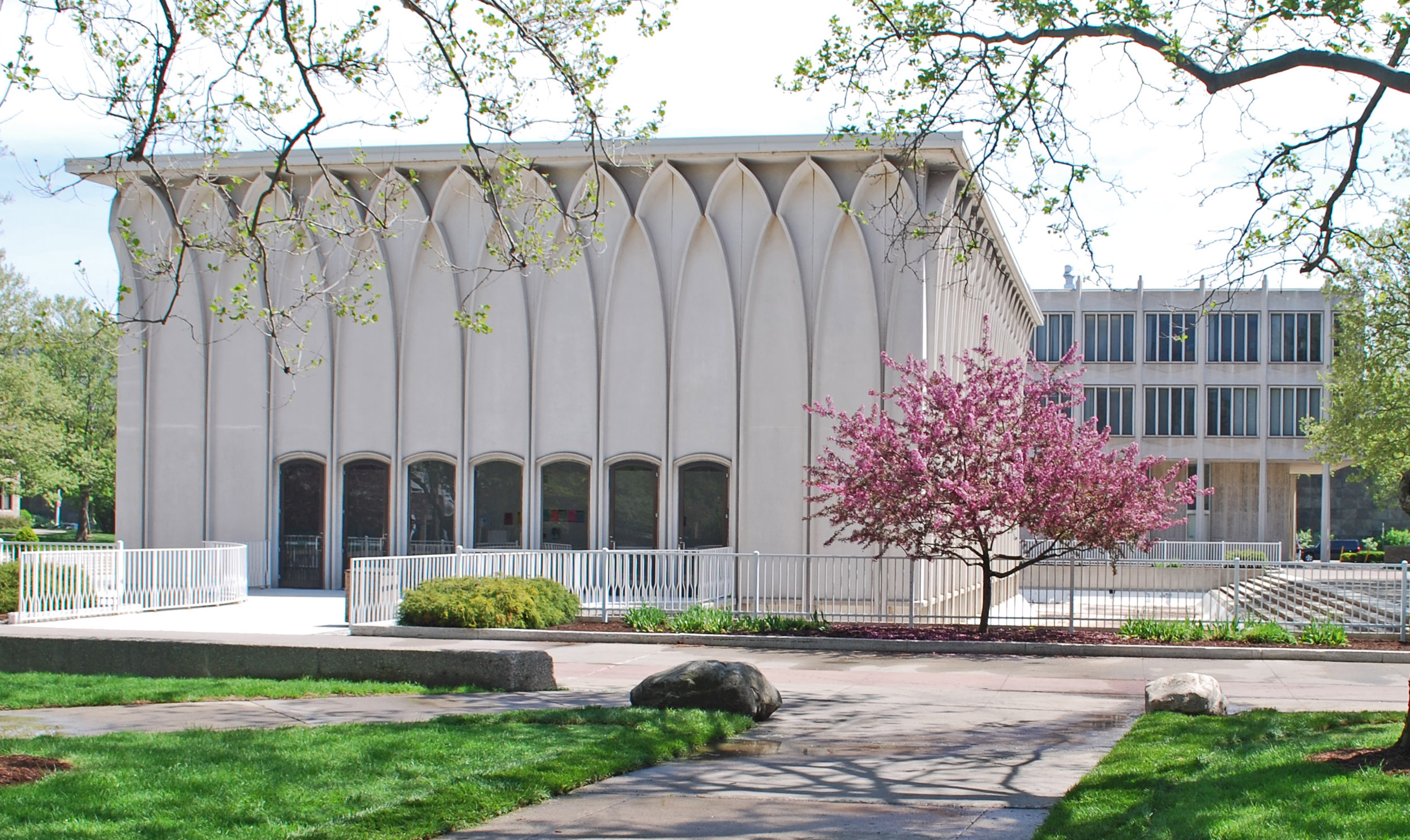
University Auditorium, with Prentis Hall in the background, showing moat around building.

In August 1955, Wayne State University hired architect Minoru Yamasaki to design the McGregor Memorial Conference Center. The commission came after Yamasaki's long convalescence and subsequent trip to Japan, and was his first opportunity to put into practice his re-envisionment of architecture. In 1957, Wayne State hired Yamasaki's firm to develop a master plan for the University's urban campus.

Both the McGregor Center and the campus master plan were completed in 1958. The McGregor Center opened to immediate accolades from architectural magazines who called it "delightful" and "refreshing," and from the American Institute of Architects who awarded Yamasaki a First Honor Award for the design. The building solidified Yamasaki's reputation as a masterful International Style architect.

Yamasaki's campus master plan called for closing off streets to auto traffic and constructing a campus around pedestrian courts. Although the entirety of Yamasaki's vision was never realized, he did design a total of four buildings on the campus: the aforementioned McGregor Memorial Conference Center in 1957-58, the College of Education Building in 1960, and the two buildings in this complex, the Prentis Building and adjoining Helen L. DeRoy Auditorium, in 1962-64. DeRoy was renamed University Auditorium in 2025.

Yamasaki began work on both the Prentis Building and the University Auditorium in the late 1950s. The buildings were to be located directly across from the Main Branch of the Detroit Public Library, on a site that was then an open mall, known as the War Memorial Mall. The mall had been only recently completed (in late 1956). Part of the mall, on which the University Auditorium now sits, had been occupied by the childhood home of Michigan governor G. Mennen Williams.

=== Meyer and Anna Prentis Building ===
The Meyer and Anna Prentis Building was constructed to meet the needs of Wayne State's growing Business School. The school had been organized in 1946 with 459 undergraduates. By 1964, that number had grown to over 1400 undergraduates and 429 graduate students, with 55 faculty members.

Groundbreaking on the structure occurred on August 1, 1962, and the new home for the business school opened on January 28, 1964. The $2.3 million construction cost for the new building was supported through the philanthropy of Federick Meyer Stuart (Stennett) and Anna Mae Prentis (McDonald). A year-and-a-half after the opening, the building was rededicated as the Meyer and Anna Prentis Building. The building was used as the home of the Business School from its opening until the school relocated to a new location by Little Caesars Arena in 2018.

=== University Auditorium ===
The University Auditorium was constructed at the same time as the Prentis Building. It was built by the firm of Darin & Armstrong for a cost of approximately $600,000. The design and construction of the building was partly financed by a $323,000 gift from the Helen L. DeRoy Foundation.

Groundbreaking for the auditorium occurred on August 1, 1962, concurrently with the Prentis building, and the auditorium opened on March 3, 1964. It was built to serve the business school, but has always been used more broadly as a lecture hall for the university as a whole. Originally named after Helen L. DeRoy, it was renamed to University Auditorium in 2025.

=== Meyer Leon Prentis ===
Meyer Prentis was born as Meyer Leon Prensky in 1886 in Lithuania. At age two, he immigrated with his parents to St. Louis, where he attended grade school, high school and finally Jones Commercial College, where he specialized in accounting, finance and commercial law. After graduation, he worked first for a large mercantile firm, and then starting in 1904 at the Laclede Gas Light Company. His supervisor boss at Laclede, C. A. McGee, left to become the controller for the newly formed General Motors Corporation, and in 1911 recruited Prentis to be General Motors's chief accountant. In 1919, Prentis was elected treasurer of General Motors, a position he held until his retirement in 1951.

In 1914, Meyer married Anna Sylvia Steinberg, a secretary at General Motors. The couple had four daughters. Meyer Prentis spent significant time on philanthropy. He was a founder of the United Foundation of Greater Detroit, an early leader of the Jewish Welfare Federation, a trustee and president of the Citizens Research Council of Michigan, a trustee of the Temple Beth El, and a founding member of the Advisory Committee to Wayne State's new business school. Meyer Prentis died in 1970, and his wife Anna died in 1974.

=== Aaron and Helen DeRoy ===
Aaron DeRoy was born in 1880 in Pittsburgh, Pennsylvania, and graduated from the University of Pittsburgh with a degree in dentistry. His wife, Helen Lowentritt DeRoy, was born in 1882 in Oil City, Pennsylvania. Her father earned a fortune in the oil industry, making Helen a wealthy young woman.

Aaron DeRoy changed careers when he became interested in automobiles. He sold first electric cars, then gasoline-powered ones, and eventually became a distributor for Studebaker. In 1922, having made a considerable fortune, he decided to retire. The DeRoys moved from Pittsburgh to Detroit, but in 1923, rather than retiring, Aaron founded the Aaron DeRoy Motor Car Company, which distributed Hudson-Essex automobiles. Aaron DeRoy continued to lead the DeRoy Motor Car Company until his death in an automobile accident in 1935.

After Aaron's death, Helen DeRoy assumed full responsibility for all of his financial operations, including the DeRoy Motor Car Company. She sold the firm in the early 1940s and subsequently established and directed the Helen L. DeRoy Foundation. The Foundation funded numerous major projects, including expanding the Jewish Community Center located on Woodward Avenue at Holbrook Street, construction of a theater at the Jewish Community Center in West Bloomfield, and a contributing to a number of Wayne State buildings. The Foundation also established a number of scholarships for deserving students at different universities. Helen DeRoy lived until 1977.

== Description ==
The Prentis Building and University Auditorium are built directly adjacent to one another, with the Prentis Building situated on Cass Avenue directly across from the Main Branch of the Detroit Public Library. The University Auditorium sits approximately 30 yards behind the Prentis Building. The two buildings are connected by a tunnel.

=== Meyer and Anna Prentis Building ===
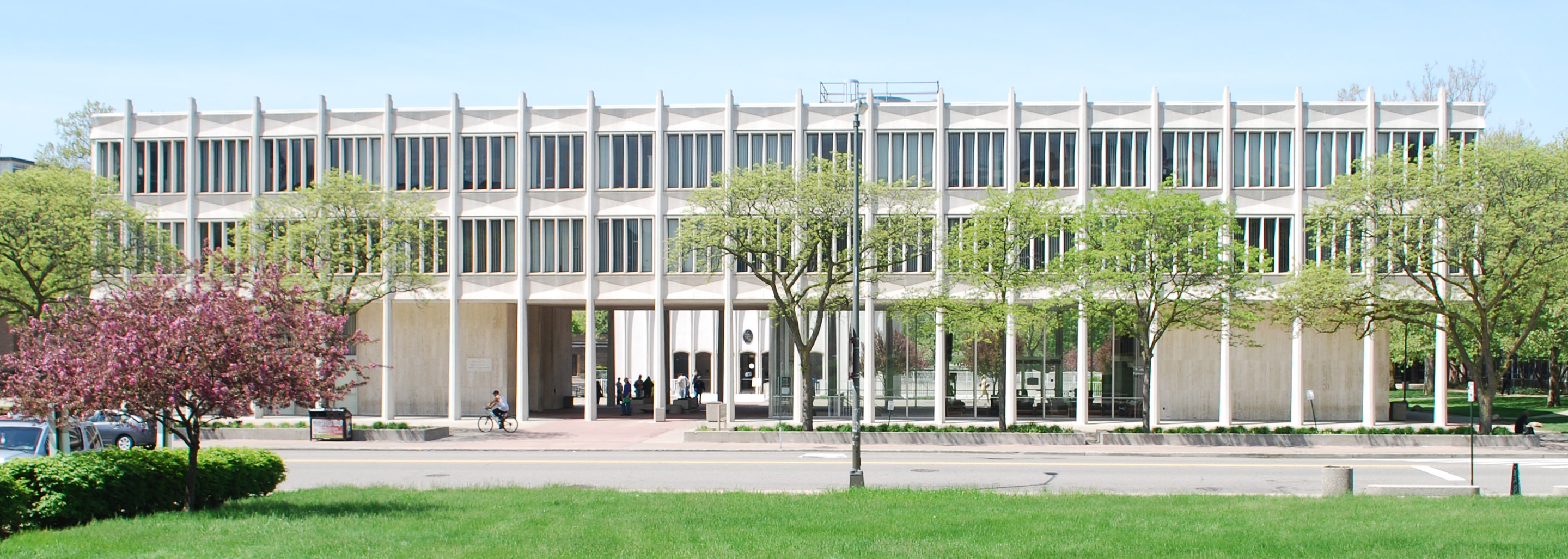
Meyer and Anna Prentis Building. Note view of DeRoy Auditorium though walk-through.

The Prentis Building is a rectangular, International Style, three-story steel-frame structure with a flat roof. A wide, off-center walk-through at ground level separates the building into north and south wings, and provides a view of the DeRoy Auditorium from Cass Avenue. The first floor is faced with buff-colored travertine marble, and the second and third stories are faced with cast concrete panels. Narrow windows are inset between the panels. The outer edges of the first floor are recessed back from the edge of the upper stories. Thin freestanding columns clad in marble-flecked concrete ring the lower floor, and meet the upper section at its edge, serving to support the two upper floors. The columns continue upward, terminating at the top of the building in a projecting finial.

On the north side of the first floor is a story-and-a-half study hall enclosed in glass panels, with a mezzanine to the north. The southern side of the first floor houses administrative offices, and the off-center walkway separating the two sections houses planters and a bench. The second and third floors are used for office space. Two double glass doors off the walkway open onto a double-turned staircase leading to the basement level. This level contains classrooms and lockers for the Wayne State School of Business Administration. The building contains a total of 65,000 square feet (6,000 m^{2}) of classroom space, some of it underneath the surrounding mall. A basement-level tunnel connects the building to the Helen L. DeRoy Auditorium.

=== University Auditorium ===
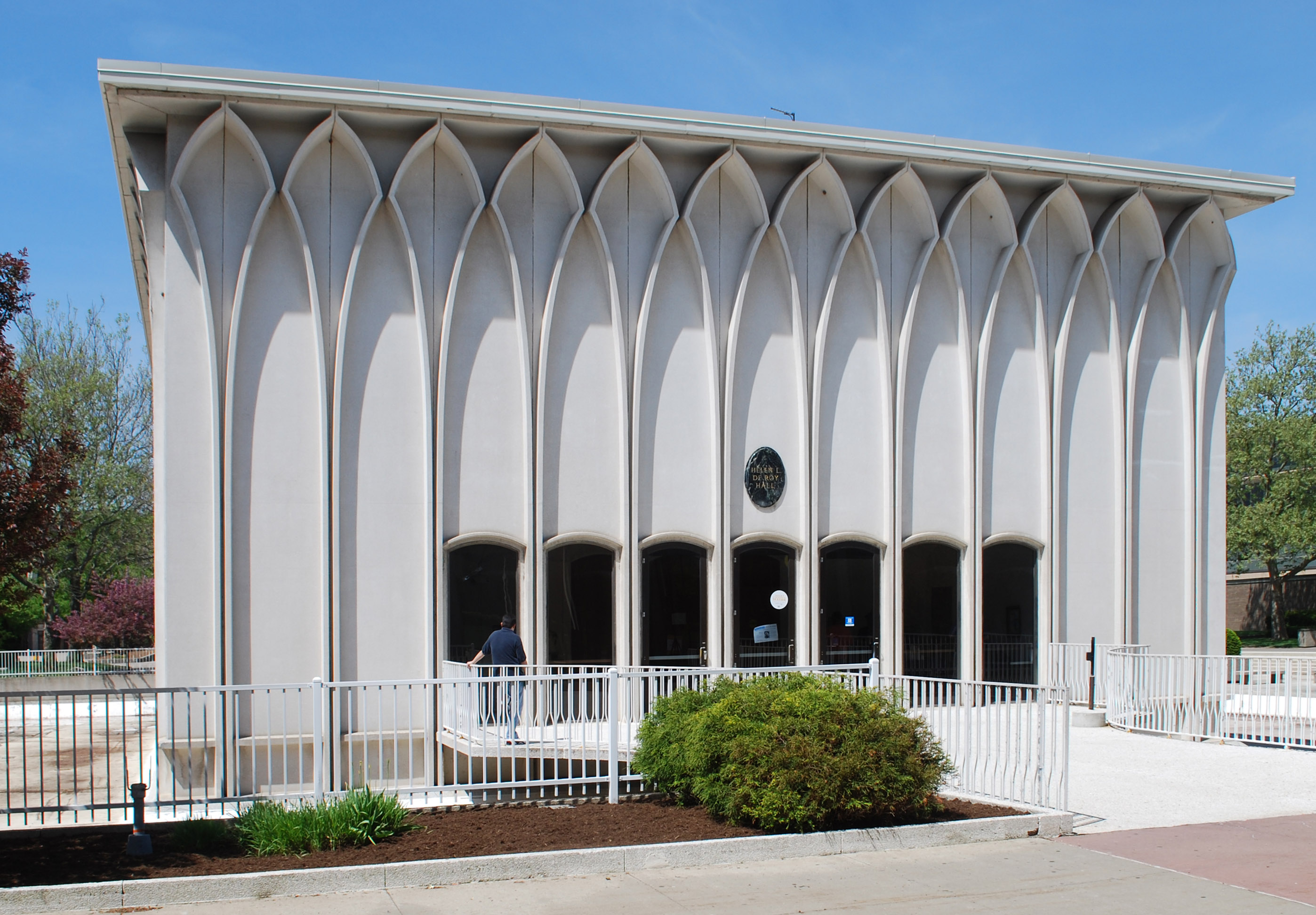
University Auditorium. Note the shadows cast by the ribs and eaves.

The University Auditorium is a nearly square two-story windowless steel-frame building with a flat roof with broadly projecting eaves. The façades are clad in narrow gray-colored cast concrete panels with white marble chips. On all four sides, raised ribs are overlaid on the panels, terminating in Gothic arches just beneath the eaves. The ribs project about four inches at ground level, but gradually increase in depth toward the top of the building until they project almost two feet near the top. The broad eaves and curving, projecting ribs create striking shadows. The gothic arch treatment on the University Auditorium is strongly similar to Yamasaki's design of the United States Science Pavilion at the 1962 World's Fair in Seattle, a commission he received while working on the auditorium.

The building is completely surrounded by a reflecting pool approximately three feet deep and twenty-two feet wide. Planters and benches line the pool, and shallow stairs allow access on the north and south sides. Bridges on the eastern and western sides of the building, as well as a tunnel from the Prentis Building, provide access. The bridges are paved with an aggregate containing marble chips, differentiating it from the surrounding sidewalk.

Inside, a small entrance lobby allows access to either the first floor auditorium or the auditorium on the lower level. The first floor auditorium seats 400 people, and the basement auditorium seats 300 people. Both auditoriums rake downward toward a front stage, and contain seating arranged in three sections, with two intermediate aisles. Restrooms are located on the lower level, as well as underground access to the Prentis Building.

=== Context ===
In the 1950s and 1960s, the Detroit area was a hotbed of Modernist architecture, with not only Yamasaki, but also Eero Saarinen, Alden Dow, and the designers at Cranbrook working in the area. Yamasaki was working to differentiate himself by exploring ornamentation and the use of historical forms like arches and columns, as well as the use of light and shadow, and integral pools and gardens. These buildings represent Yamasaki's honing of his vision, and were built at a time when he was becoming increasingly famous, garnering commissions for the United States Science Pavilion at the 1962 World's Fair in Seattle and, in 1963, the World Trade Center.
