= McGregor Memorial Conference Center =

University building in Detroit, Michigan

- U.S. National Register of Historic Places
- U.S. National Historic Landmark
- McGregor Memorial Conference Center and Reflecting Pool in 2025
- Interactive map
- Location: 495 Ferry Mall; Detroit, Michigan
- Coordinates: 42°21′33″N 83°4′15″W
- Built: 1958
- Architect: Minoru Yamasaki
- Architectural style: International Style
- NRHP reference No.: 10001023

Significant dates
- Added to NRHP: December 13, 2010
- Designated NHL: February 27, 2015

The McGregor Memorial Conference Center is a meeting and event facility on the campus of Wayne State University in Midtown Detroit, Michigan, designed by noted American architect Minoru Yamasaki (1912–1986) and completed in 1958. The design marks a shift in style from Yamasaki's earlier International Style work to the New Formalism of his later years. The building was designated a National Historic Landmark for its architectural quality in 2015.

== History ==
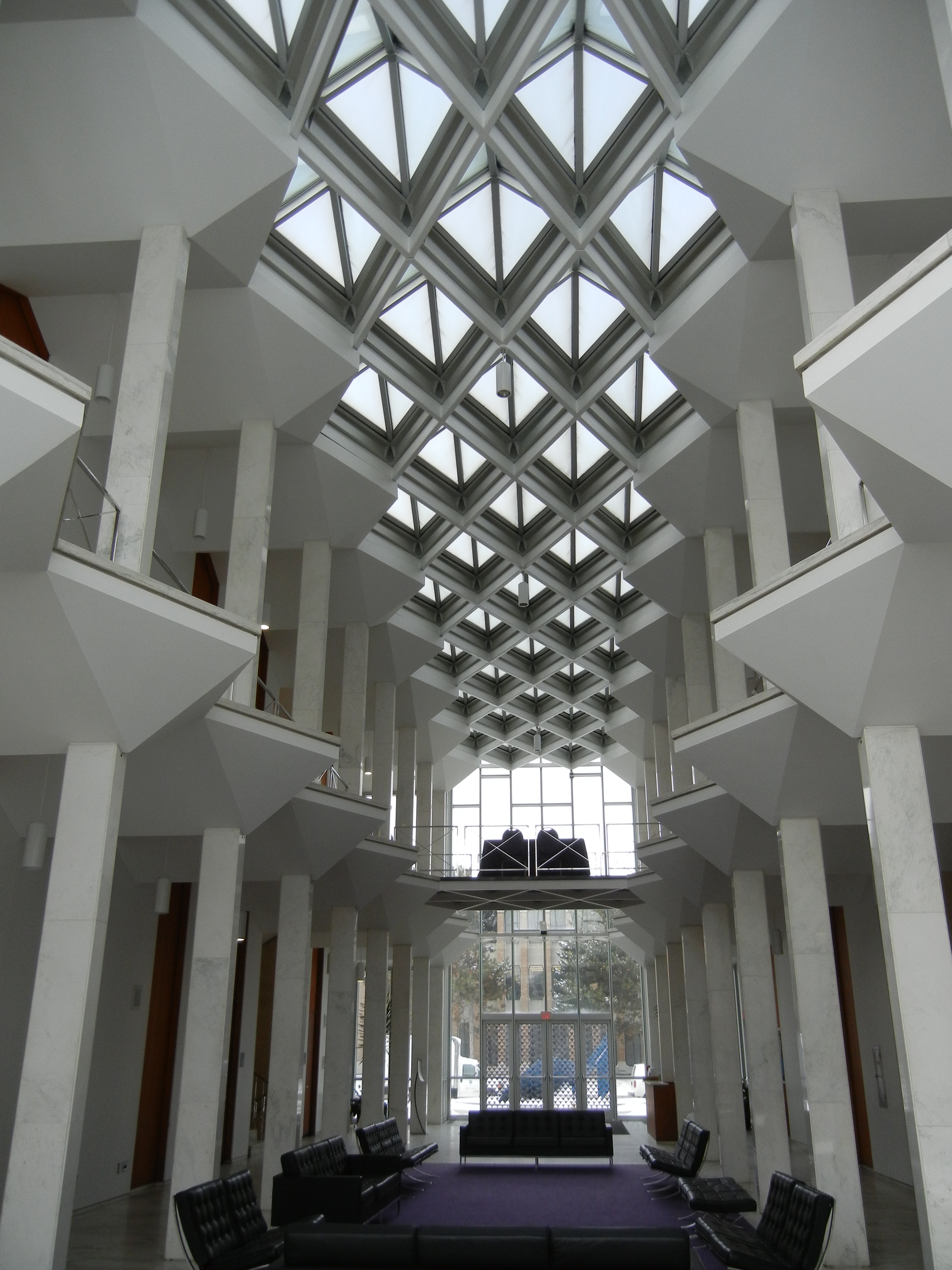
McGregor Center Atrium

The McGregor Memorial Conference Center was funded by the McGregor Fund, as a memorial to Tracy W. and Katherine McGregor who initiated the fund in 1925. The McGregor Fund specified that the building be used as "a community conference center for groups of citizens interested in exploring ways and means of being helpful to others." To that end, Wayne State University hired architect Minoru Yamasaki in August 1955 to design the building. The commission came after Yamasaki's long convalescence and subsequent trip to Japan, and was his first opportunity to put into practice his re-envisionment of architecture. The center was completed in 1958, and opened to immediate accolades from architectural magazines who called it "delightful" and "refreshing," and from the American Institute of Architects who awarded Yamasaki a First Honor Award for the design. Over the next seven years, Yamasaki designed three more buildings for Wayne's campus: the Education Building, Prentis Hall, and DeRoy Auditorium.

== Description ==
The McGregor Memorial Conference Center is a two-story symmetrical pavilion covered with travertine marble. It sits on a podium faced with Mankato stone, with integral reflecting pool and sunken garden wrapping around the building on two sides. The building exhibits a triangular design motif on the outside and inside. Inside, a skylit entry hall, dividing the interior space in two, is flanked by two levels of conference rooms. The McGregor Center contains 11 meeting rooms, a 600-seat auditorium, a 2,500 sq ft (230 m^{2}) reception area, and a 3,500 sq ft (330 m^{2}) exhibit space. The conference rooms can be combined to accommodate groups of various sizes. Interior design features white marble floors, red carpeting, and black leather chairs by Mies van der Rohe.

== Gallery ==
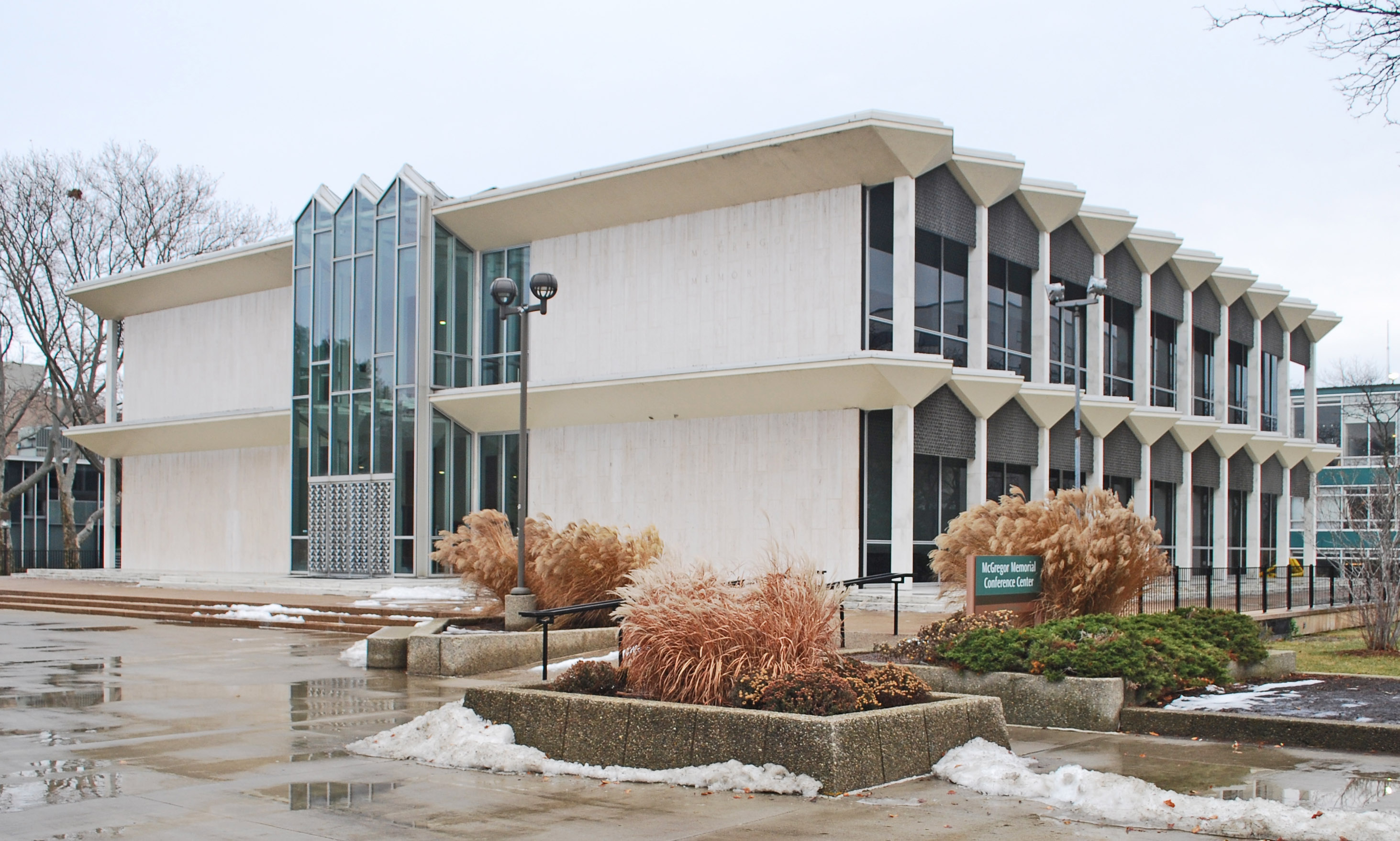
McGregor Memorial Conference Center (2010)

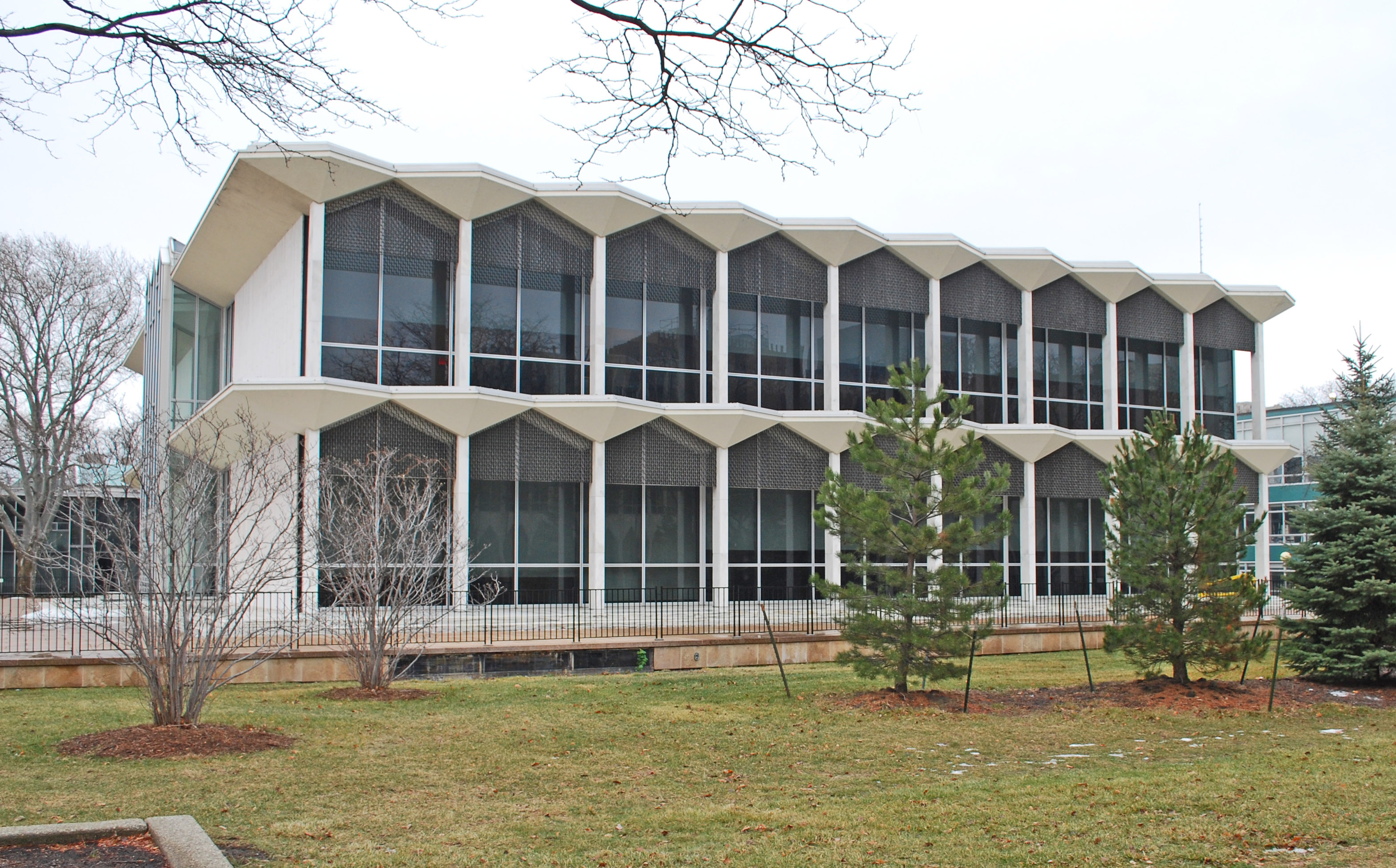
Side view of center showing beam structure (2010)

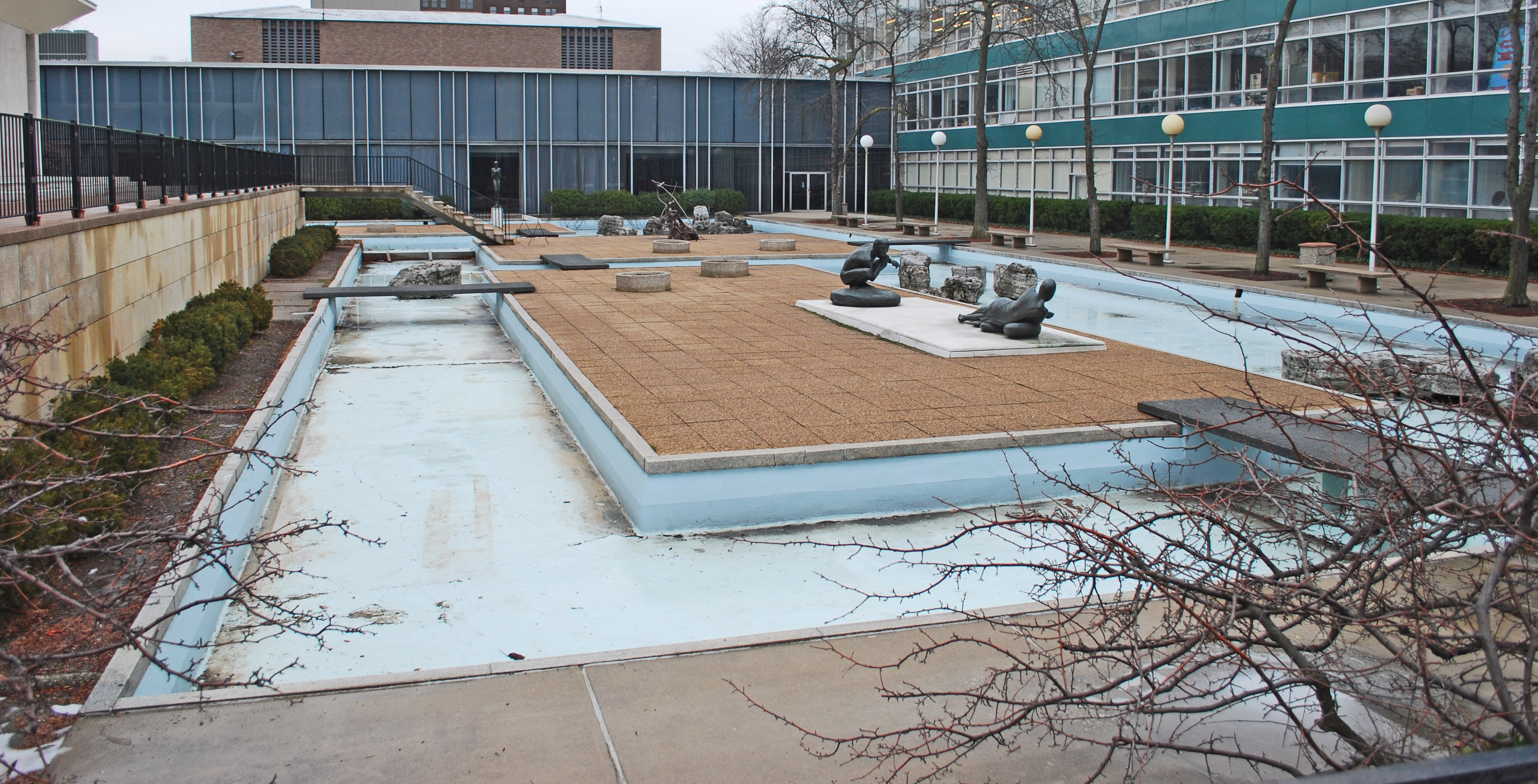
Pond in rear of Center (2010)

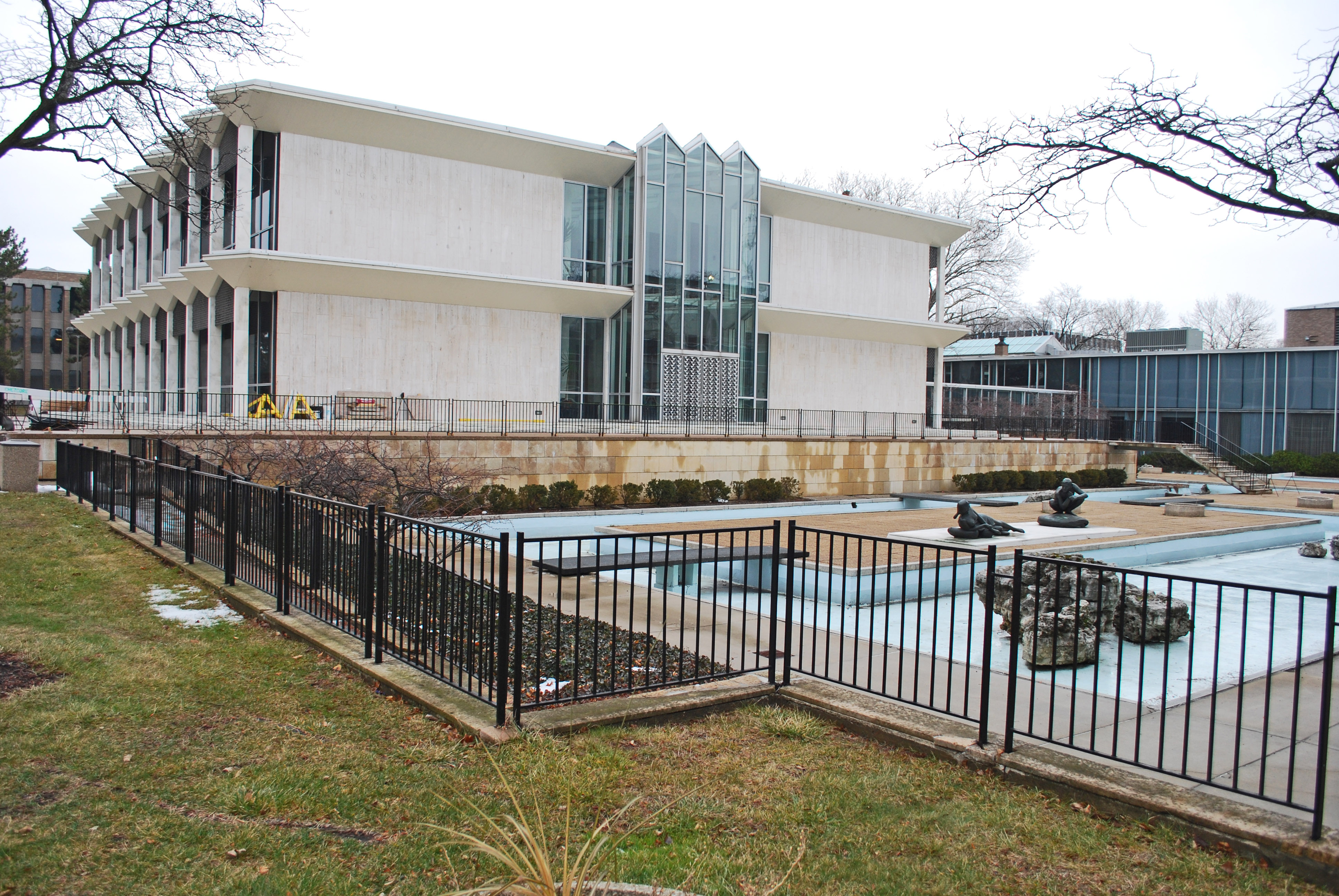
Pond in relation to Center (2010)

McGregor Memorial Conference Center and McGregor Reflecting Pool (2025)

McGregor Reflecting Pool (2025)

McGregor Memorial Conference Center (2025)

McGregor Memorial Conference Center and McGregor Reflecting Pool (2025)

== See also ==
- List of National Historic Landmarks in Michigan
- National Register of Historic Places listings in Detroit, Michigan
