= James R. Martin =

American filmmaker

James "Jim" R. Martin is an American writer, independent producer, director, and documentary filmmaker. He is best known for his PBS feature-length documentary Wrapped In Steel, broadcast nationally in 1984–85, and PBS documentary Fired-Up Public Housing is my Home broadcast nationally in 1988–89. Both Wrapped In Steel and Fired-Up were nominated for Emmy Awards. Fired-Up won an Emmy for Best Independent Network Documentary, Chicago.

Wrapped in Steel, a 90-minute PBS documentary, was part of the Southeast Chicago Historical Project funded by The National Endowment for The Humanities (NEH), Illinois Humanities Council (IHC), and Columbia College Chicago. The documentary focused on multi-ethnic SE Chicago Steel Mill neighborhoods at a critical time for urban America when cities were moving from dependence on a heavy industry economy.

Four years in the making, Wrapped In Steel was a part of the Southeast Chicago Historical Project, which facilitated a community history project in which residents used various media to examine their past and present conditions. Project and documentary activities touched the 100,000-resident neighborhoods of South Chicago, South Deering, East Side, and Hegewisch, where a large percentage of the community worked at the steel mills located in their area. In addition to the documentary film, the community history project left tangible reminders of the history and culture of area residents in the neighborhood after the project ended. Some of the results of the project are two years of articles about the history of the area in The Daily Calumet (1982–1983), a multi-media exhibit at the Museum of Science and Industry (Chicago), and a revitalized local Southeast Chicago Historical Society. Prominent scholars and residents examined the culture and history of these working-class neighborhoods. Among those consultants were William Kornblum, Blue Collar Community, Sol Tax, anthropologist Dominic Pacyga, historian Tom Cottle, psychologist Mike Alexandrof, President of Columbia College Edward Sadlowski, United Steel Workers of America, and thousands of residents.

Emmy Award-winning Fired-Up: Public Housing is my Home, a 60-minute PBS documentary, looks at an attempt to introduce the Tenant Management concept to Chicago Public Housing (CHA) developments including Cabrini–Green and other developments. The Tenant Management model was based on the work of Bertha Gilkey at Cochran Gardens in St. Louis. The program sought to empower tenants to take charge of the developments and their own lives.

Fired-Up follows the residents of CHA Public Housing developments, including Cabrini–Green and Ida B Wells developments, as they learn about basic concepts like what a lease is and tenant management concepts. Female residents (over 95% public housing residents are women and children) express their fears and problems as they struggle to establish some order to their development buildings and their lives. Residents visit Cochran Gardens in St. Louis, where they see a successful tenant-managed development.

The "Fired-Up" project was sponsored by the Metropolitan Planning Council of Chicago, and the documentary received funding from the Kraft Foundation, American Bank, the Sophia Fund, and Columbia College, Chicago. The film was written produced and directed by Professor James R (Jim) Martin at Columbia College Chicago. Director Documentary Filmmaking, August 1994 to October 2014, Full Sail University, Winter Park, Florida. Lecturer documentary production, Shenzen, China, Qingdao China and Beijing China. Currently Writer, Producer, and Director at J R Martin Media Inc.and Publisher Real Deal Press, Winter Park, Florida

== Publications ==
- Create Documentary Films, Videos, And Multimedia: a comprehensive guide to using documentary storytelling techniques for film, video, Internet and digital media projects (2010) ISBN 978-0-9827023-0-7
- Actuality Interviewing and Listening (2017) ISBN 978-0-9827023-6-9
- Documentary Directing and Storytelling (2018) ISBN 978-1-7216794-6-1
- Listen Learn Share (2018) ISBN 978-0-9827023-8-3
- Storytelling In The SEO Age (2023) ISBN 979-8-9875933-87
- Office and Home Tai Chi with Yue Zhang (2020) ISBN 979-8-9875933-5-6
- The Shaolin Temple Story with Shi Yongxin (2023) ISBN 979-8-9855287-4-9
- Silhouettes and Shadows (2022) ISBN 979-8-9855287-2-5
