= Pruitt–Igoe =

Demolished housing project in St. Louis, US

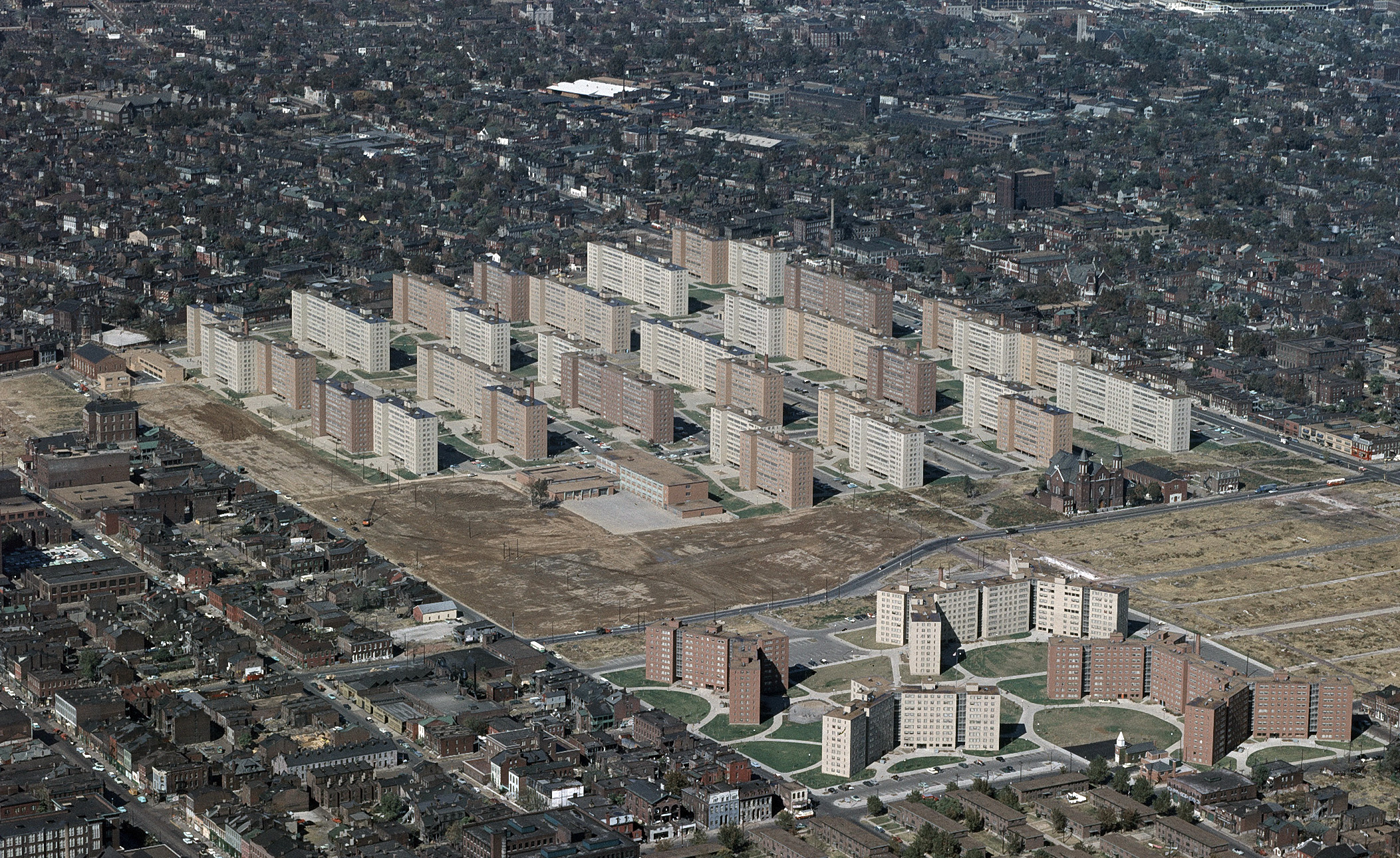
- The Wendell O. Pruitt Homes and William Igoe Apartments complex

General information
- Location: St. Louis, Missouri, US
- Coordinates: 38°38′32.24″N 90°12′33.95″W
- Status: Demolished
- Area: 57 acres (23 ha)
- No. of blocks: 33
- No. of units: 2,870
- Density: 50 units per acre (120/ha)

Construction
- Constructed: 1951–1955
- Architect: Minoru Yamasaki
- Style: International Style, modern

Listing
- Demolished: 1972–1976

The Wendell O. Pruitt Homes and William Igoe Apartments, known together as Pruitt–Igoe (/ˈpruːɪt ˈaɪɡoʊ/), were joint urban housing projects first occupied in 1954 in St. Louis, Missouri, United States. The complex of 33 eleven-story high rises was designed in the modernist architectural style by Minoru Yamasaki. At the time of opening, it was one of the largest public housing developments in the country. It was constructed with federal funds on the site of a former slum as part of the city's urban renewal program. Despite being legally integrated, it almost exclusively accommodated African Americans.

Although initially viewed as an improvement over the tenement housing it replaced, living conditions in Pruitt–Igoe began to deteriorate soon after completion. By the mid-1960s it was plagued by poor maintenance and crime, particularly vandalism and juvenile delinquency. Numerous initiatives to reverse the decline failed, and by 1970 more than two-thirds of the complex was vacant. Demolition of the complex began in 1972 with a televised implosion of several of the buildings. Over the next four years, the rest of the complex was vacated and demolished.

In the aftermath of its demolition, Pruitt–Igoe became a symbol of the failings of the society-changing aspirations of modernist architecture, as the project's problems were widely attributed to architectural flaws that created a hostile and unsafe environment. Critic Charles Jencks described its demolition as "the day Modern architecture died". More recent appraisals have placed a greater emphasis on St. Louis's precipitously declining population, and fiscal problems with the local housing authority. The Architectural Review states in a summary of the modern consensus that the project was "doomed from the outset". As of 2024, a large portion of the Pruitt–Igoe site remains vacant, although new development is pending.

== Description ==
Pruitt–Igoe consisted of 33 eleven-story concrete apartment buildings, clad in brick, on a 57-acre (23 ha) site, on St. Louis's north side, bounded by Cass Avenue on the north, North Jefferson Avenue on the west, Carr Street on the south, and North 20th Street on the east. Each building was 170 feet (52 m) long; most contained between 80 and 90 units, although some buildings had up to 150. The complex totaled 2,870 apartments (1,736 in Pruitt and 1,132 in Igoe) housing more than 10,000 people at full occupancy.

The apartments were deliberately small, with undersized kitchen appliances, and few units were designed for larger families. The apartments were not equipped with balconies. "Skip-stop" elevators stopped only at the first, fourth, seventh, and tenth "anchor" floors in an attempt to lessen elevator congestion, forcing many residents to use the stairs. The same anchor floors were equipped with large south-facing communal corridors called "galleries", as well as laundry rooms and garbage chutes.

== History ==
=== Background ===
During the 1940s, the city of St. Louis was overcrowded, with housing conditions in some areas being said to resemble "something out of a Charles Dickens novel". Its housing stock had deteriorated, and more than 85,000 families lived in 19th century tenements. An official survey from 1947 found that 33,000 homes had communal toilets. Middle-class, predominantly white, residents were leaving the city, and their former residences became occupied by low-income families. Black slums in the north and white slums in the south were expanding and threatening to engulf the city center. To save central properties from an imminent loss of value, city authorities settled on redevelopment of the inner ring around the central business district. Due to the state of decay, neighborhood gentrification never received serious consideration.

The first generation of St. Louis public housing was enabled by the Housing Act of 1937 and opened in 1942 as two identical but racially segregated low-rise developments: Carr Square in the northwest for African Americans, and Clinton Peabody in the southwest for whites. The projects, intended for the working poor rather than the truly destitute, were successful.

In 1947, St. Louis planners proposed to replace DeSoto-Carr, a run-down neighborhood with many black residents, with new two- and three-story residential blocks and a public park. The plan did not materialize; instead, Democratic mayor Joseph Darst, elected in 1949, and Republican state leaders favored clearing the slums and replacing them with high-rise, high-density public housing. They reasoned that the new projects would help the city through increased revenues, new parks, playgrounds and shopping space. Darst stated in 1951:

We must rebuild, open up and clean up the hearts of our cities. The fact that slums were created with all the intrinsic evils was everybody's fault. Now it is everybody's responsibility to repair the damage.

In 1948, voters rejected the proposal for a municipal loan to finance urban redevelopment, but soon the situation was changed with the Housing Act of 1949 and Missouri state laws that provided co-financing of public housing projects. The approach taken by Darst, urban renewal, was shared by President Harry S. Truman's administration and fellow mayors of other cities overwhelmed by industrial workers recruited during the war. Specifically, the St. Louis Land Clearance and Redevelopment Authority was authorized to acquire and demolish the slums of the inner ring and then sell the land at reduced prices to private developers in the hopes of fostering middle-class development and luring families back from the suburbs. Another agency, the St. Louis Housing Authority, had to clear land to construct public housing for the former slum dwellers.

=== Design and construction ===
By 1950, St. Louis had received a federal commitment under the Housing Act of 1949 to finance 5,800 public housing units. The first large public housing in St. Louis, Cochran Gardens, was completed in 1953. It contained 704 units in a mix of medium- and high-rise buildings. It was followed by three more projects: Pruitt–Igoe, Vaughn, and Darst–Webbe. Pruitt–Igoe was named for St. Louisans Wendell O. Pruitt, an African-American fighter pilot in World War II, and William L. Igoe, a former US Congressman. Originally, the city planned two partitions: Pruitt for black residents and Igoe for whites, as St. Louis public housing was segregated until 1955.

In 1950, the city picked Leinweber, Yamasaki & Hellmuth, an architectural firm based in St. Louis, to design the new public housing complex. The project was led by architect Minoru Yamasaki, then early in his career, and performed under supervision and constraints imposed by the federal authorities. His initial proposal, which included walk-up and mid-rise buildings as well as high-rises, was accepted by the St. Louis authorities, but exceeded the federal cost limits imposed by the Public Housing Administration; the agency intervened and imposed a uniform building height of 11 floors. Shortages of materials caused by the Korean War and tensions in the Congress further tightened federal controls. Overall density was set at a level of 50 units per acre, higher than in downtown slums. Although each row of buildings was supposed to be flanked by a "river of open space", landscaping was omitted from the final plan and few trees were planted.

Construction began in 1951. Pruitt accepted its first tenants in November 1954, Igoe in July 1955. When the two projects opened, they were one of the largest public housing developments in the country. Even under federal cost-cutting regulations, Pruitt–Igoe initially cost $36 million (equivalent to $342 million in 2025), 60 percent above the national average for public housing; one factor was the installation of an expensive heating system. Despite the poor build quality, material suppliers cited Pruitt–Igoe in their advertisements to capitalize on the national exposure of the project.

=== Early years ===
Pruitt–Igoe was initially seen as a breakthrough in urban renewal. One early resident described her 11th floor apartment as a "poor man's penthouse". Pruitt–Igoe was officially desegregated by a Supreme Court decision in 1954, and as many as 40 percent of the initial tenants were white, but by the mid 1960s it had become exclusively African American.

=== Decline ===
By 1958, just four years after the opening of the project, deteriorating conditions were already evident. Elevator breakdowns and vandalism were cited as major problems—Yamasaki later lamented that he "never thought people were that destructive". Ventilation was poor during St. Louis's hot and humid summers. Meanwhile, the St. Louis Housing Authority was in the midst of a decades-long problem with inefficient and costly maintenance of its buildings, partly attributed to the power of labor unions. The stairwells and corridors attracted muggers, a situation exacerbated by the skip-stop elevators. Its location in "a sea of decaying and abandoned buildings" and limited access to shopping and recreation (ground-floor businesses had been eliminated from the design to save money, and the complex had no public mailbox) contributed to its problems. The huge, 11-story buildings of the development were reportedly a magnet for criminals and vagrants from the surrounding low-rise slums; a 1959 audit reported that most of the vandalism was committed by transients rather than residents, and a 1967 report similarly found that a "relatively large proportion" of crimes were committed by outsiders. Large criminal gangs were not common in the project.

The Recession of 1958 led to increased crime, vacancy, and rent delinquency in the development, which cut into the housing authority's revenue. In response, the authority reduced maintenance by 10%, and the reduction in maintenance coupled with a grand jury report that criticized crime levels in Pruitt–Igoe caused a significant drop in applications to the development. Increasing vacancy rates set off a feedback loop where the loss of revenue from rent forced the housing authority to curtail maintenance, further reducing the project's desirability. Occupancy at both Pruitt and Igoe peaked in the first years, at 95% and 86% respectively. In the 1960s, Pruitt remained about 75% full and Igoe 65%. In 1969, those numbers fell to 57.1% and 48.9%. At one point the vacancy rate was higher than any other public housing complex in the country. The annual turn-over rate was 20%.

After 1960, the rental income from Pruitt–Igoe failed to cover the cost of operation, forcing the housing authority to tap into its reserves and causing cutbacks at other developments, which were themselves profitable. Attempts by local authorities to improve living conditions were handicapped by lack of resources, though numerous programs, including the hiring of private security, rent incentives to attract new tenants, and grants for academic studies, were tried. As the financial position of the authority worsened, it raised the minimum rent from $20 a month in 1952 ($242.50 in 2025), to $32 in 1958 ($357.10 in 2025), $43 in 1962 ($457.70 in 2025), and $58 in 1968 ($537.00 in 2025). The increases forced some families to devote as much as 75% of their income to rent. In addition to the rent increases, tenants were charged for basic services like replacing fuses and door locks. The rent increases were a major factor in a nine-month rent strike by tenants in 1969. The strike began on February 2 at other public housing projects in the city and spread to Pruitt–Igoe by April 1. It ended with a settlement under which the board of commissioners of the housing authority resigned and tenant organizations were granted more influence.

In 1965, the project received a federal grant to improve the physical condition of the buildings and establish social programs for residents, but the grant failed to reverse the decline. Between 1963 and 1966 it was the subject of a sociological study by Lee Rainwater. In 1966, the Pruitt–Igoe Neighborhood Corporation commissioned a survey of the housing project that catalogued numerous issues with its maintenance, security, and management. Basic services like elevators and heating often failed, and maintenance sometimes took years to respond to tenant requests.

The withdrawal in 1967 of a private security force that patrolled the buildings led to a further escalation in crime and vandalism, which was partially attributed to the large number of juveniles in single-parent households; a census undertaken in September 1965 found that 69.2 percent of inhabitants were minors, and less than 30 percent of households with children had both parents present. Teenage pregnancy and juvenile delinquency were considered major problems by the residents. Families at Pruitt–Igoe were large: the average household had four minors. Nearly half of births (and 73 percent of first-born children) were out of wedlock, though this statistic was no higher in Pruitt–Igoe than in nearby private housing.

In spite of the widespread issues, most inhabitants of Pruitt–Igoe continued to live ordinary lives, and, according to Rainwater and activist Joan Miller, "the vast majority ... responded to their sick society in a healthy manner." 78% of residents reported that they were satisfied with their apartment, and 80% said that Pruitt–Igoe met their needs "a little better" or "much better" than their previous place of residence. The project contained isolated pockets of well-being throughout its worst years, and apartments clustered around small, two-family landings with tenants working to maintain and clear their common areas were often relatively successful.

=== Demolition ===
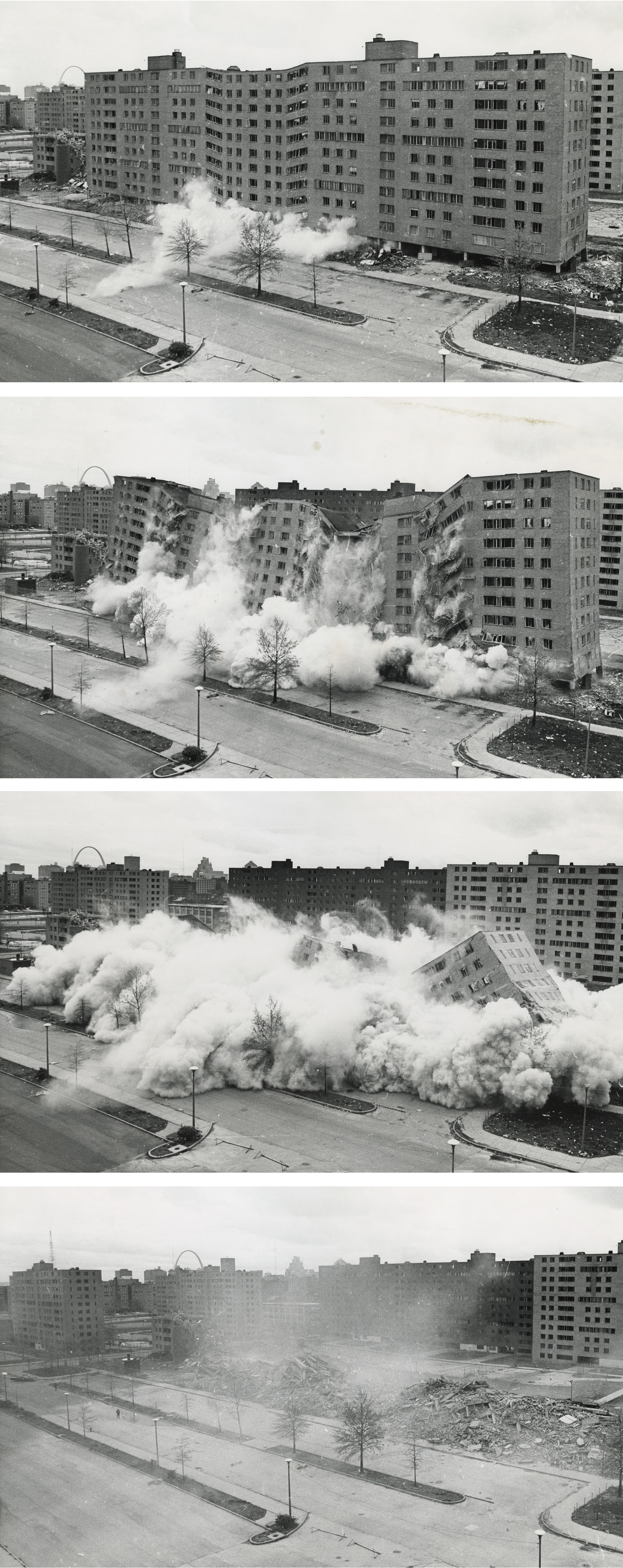
The second, widely televised demolition of a Pruitt–Igoe building on April 21, 1972.

In 1968, the federal Department of Housing and Urban Development (HUD) began encouraging the remaining residents to leave Pruitt–Igoe. A 1970 report assessed the extent of the physical damage to the buildings as "nearly unbelievable" and far worse than in the other St. Louis projects. Many buildings had been practically ransacked, with broken windows and doors, walls stripped for wire and pipe, and garbage strewn about the site. Only 10 of the original 33 buildings were still occupied. In December 1971, state and federal authorities agreed to demolish two of the Pruitt–Igoe buildings. They hoped that a gradual reduction in population and building density could improve the situation; by this time, Pruitt–Igoe had consumed $57 million, an investment which they felt could not be wholly abandoned. Authorities considered different possibilities for rehabilitating Pruitt–Igoe, including conversion to a low-rise neighborhood by collapsing the towers down to a few floors to reduce the density. After 1971, most tenants were consolidated into the Igoe section. Despite the impending demolition, more than $1 million was spent on renovation in the 1970s, mainly funded by grants from the federal government.

After months of preparation, the first building was demolished with explosives on March 16, 1972. More buildings followed on April 21, June 9, and July 15. HUD announced in August 1973 their decision to demolish the rest of the complex. A last-minute attempt to purchase and rehabilitate a few of the buildings by a neighborhood community development corporation was rejected by HUD. The last tenant moved out in May 1974, and the project was fully cleared by 1976 at a total cost of $3.5 million – becoming the first major housing projects in the United States to be demolished. Footage of the demolition was featured in the film Koyaanisqatsi.

=== Site ===
Since Pruitt–Igoe's demolition, various plans have been put forth for the use of its site, including a golf course, a business park, and a 50-story tower. An elementary school was built on part of the site in 1995, but as of 2023 a significant part of it remains vacant, even as adjacent lots have been redeveloped.

In 2020, Ponce Health Sciences University announced its intention to construct an $80 million facility on the site. When completed, the facility is planned to house the Ponce Health Sciences University School of Medicine in St. Louis. In 2021, a developer submitted zoning applications for the construction of office buildings and a hotel on the site. An urgent care center named after the former Homer G. Phillips Hospital was built in 2022, but restrictions related to the construction of a new headquarters for the National Geospatial-Intelligence Agency on an adjacent lot were reportedly stalling the redevelopment of the site.

== Legacy ==
Pruitt–Igoe has received extensive commentary in the architectural literature; architect William Ramroth describes it as "the most infamous public housing disaster in American history" and a "poster child" for the failures of public housing projects. Nonetheless, the initial reception of Pruitt–Igoe was positive, although contrary to popular belief the project never won any architectural awards. In 1951, before construction had finished, an Architectural Forum article lauded Yamasaki's original proposal, praising the layout as "vertical neighborhoods for poor people", and Yamasaki biographer Paul Kidder appraised it as "an amazingly ambitious effort to turn the embarrassment of tenement squalor in a great American city into something decent and good".

Although Yamasaki's design followed modernist conventions and was influenced by Le Corbusier's ville radieuse concept, many design decisions were imposed by federal authorities, including vetoing the original proposal of a mix of structures of different heights. Those decisions were motivated by a desire to value engineer the project. Even before the completion of the project, Yamasaki was skeptical that high-rise buildings would be beneficial to tenants, stating that "The low building with low density is unquestionably more satisfactory than multi-story living." Nonetheless, he defended the high-rise design as a practical necessity for clearing slums.

Criticism of the project's architectural design began in the 1960s. The skip-stop elevators forced many residents to use the stairwells, where muggings were frequent. The galleries, which were unpainted, unfurnished, and dimly-lit, served as hang-outs for criminal gangs rather than communal spaces. The landscaping intended to make Pruitt–Igoe "towers in the park" was cut from the final plan, and the surrounding area subsequently turned to wasteland. In addition to the architectural flaws, the overall quality of construction was extremely poor: the buildings were described by housing researcher Eugene Meehan as "little more than steel and concrete rabbit warrens, poorly designed, badly equipped, inadequate in size, badly located, unventilated, and virtually impossible to maintain".

After the demolition of the first buildings in 1972, Pruitt–Igoe received wider attention and began to be perceived as a failure of modernist architecture as a whole. By the late 1970s, this view had coalesced into "architectural dogma", especially for the nascent movements of postmodern architecture and environment and behavior architecture. Postmodern architectural historian Charles Jencks called its destruction "the day Modern architecture died" and considered it a direct indictment of the society-changing aspirations of the International school of architecture and an example of modernists' intentions running contrary to real-world social development.

Pruitt–Igoe served as a case study for Oscar Newman's concept of defensible space, in which structures are laid out so that residents have control and responsibility over their surroundings. Newman criticized the large spaces shared by dozens of families as "anonymous public spaces [that] made it impossible for even neighboring residents to develop an accord about acceptable behavior", and attributed Pruitt–Igoe's social problems to its high-rise design and lack of defensible space, contrasting it unfavorably with the adjacent Carr Village, a low-rise area with a similar demographic makeup that remained fully occupied and largely trouble-free in the same period. Newman's analysis was one of the most influential in attributing the project's failure to "environmentally determined architecture".

Other critics argue that the Pruitt–Igoe's architecture has been overemphasized compared to political and social factors, a view prominently advanced by Katharine Bristol (at the time a doctoral student in architecture) in a 1991 article titled "The Pruitt–Igoe Myth". While acknowledging flaws in the project's design, Bristol cited the underfunding of public housing and consequent inability for the housing authority to properly maintain the buildings and the deleterious effects of poverty and racial discrimination on its residents as crucial factors in Pruitt–Igoe's decline. The steep fall in St. Louis's population exacerbated the project's vacancy problem—instead of growing from 850,000 in the 1940s to 1 million in 1970 as projected, the city lost 30 percent of its residents in that timespan due to suburbanization and white flight, as well as 11,000 manufacturing jobs in an overall shift from a blue collar to white collar economy. The Pruitt-Igoe Myth, a 2011 documentary film, largely followed Bristol's view.

In his book-length study of St. Louis public housing policy, Eugene Meehan assessed the root cause as "a set of policies programmed for failure", in particular the requirement of the Housing Act of 1949 that local housing authorities pay their expenses from rental income, which made them vulnerable to fiscal problems. The "mindless concentration on dollar costs" and "voracious and inefficient" local construction industry also contributed to the project's maintenance woes. Widespread voter opposition to public housing, both locally and nationally, created a "hostile climate" that limited financial assistance from the government; in turn, the eventual failure of the project contributed to the further unpopularity of public housing, both locally and nationally. According to The Architectural Review, the modern consensus is that the underfunded project was "doomed from the outset".

The failure and demolition of Pruitt–Igoe damaged Yamasaki's reputation as an architect, and he personally regretted designing the buildings.

== See also ==
=== Americas ===
- Brewster-Douglass Housing Projects, in Detroit, Michigan
- Cabrini–Green, in Chicago, Illinois
- Conjunto Urbano Nonoalco Tlatelolco, in Mexico City, Mexico
- Father Panik Village, in Bridgeport, Connecticut
- Glenny Drive Apartments, in Buffalo, New York
- Regent Park, in Toronto, Ontario
- Robert Taylor Homes, in Chicago, Illinois
- St. James Town, in Toronto, Ontario

=== Europe ===
- Aylesbury Estate, in London, England, United Kingdom
- Ballymun Flats, in Dublin, Ireland
- Bijlmermeer, in Amsterdam, Netherlands
- Luník IX, in Košice, Slovakia
- Million Programme, in Sweden
- Red Road Flats, in Glasgow, Scotland, United Kingdom
- Roundshaw Estate, in Wallington, England, United Kingdom
- Panel house, in various former communist countries in Eastern Europe
- Robin Hood Gardens, in London, England, United Kingdom
- Vele di Scampia, in Scampia, Napoli, Italy
