= Minoru Yamasaki =

American architect (1912–1986)

- 山崎 實
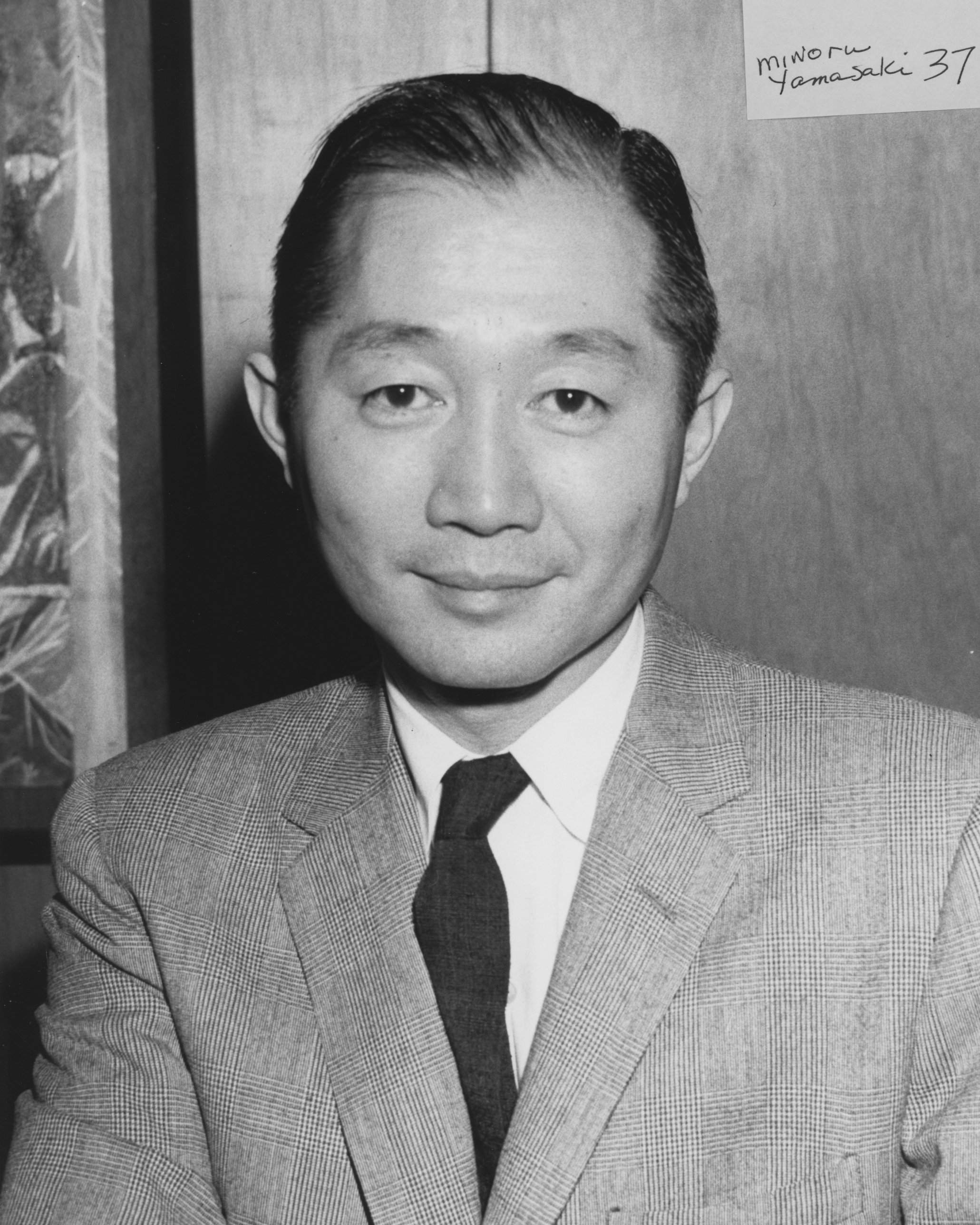
- Yamasaki in 1959
- Born: December 1, 1912; Seattle, Washington, U.S.
- Died: February 6, 1986 (aged 73); Detroit, Michigan, U.S.
- Education: University of Washington (BArch); New York University (MArch)
- Occupation: Architect
- Spouses: Teruko Hirashiki (m. 1941; div. 1961); (m. 1969); Peggy Watty (m. 1961; div. 1963)
- Children: 3, including Taro Yamasaki
- Buildings: Pruitt–Igoe (1954); Pacific Science Center (1962); World Trade Center (1973); Century Plaza Towers (1975); BOK Tower (1976); Rainier Tower (1977); Federal Reserve Bank of Richmond (1978); Torre Picasso (1988)
- Design: New Formalism, with inspiration from Gothic architecture and usage of narrow vertical windows

Minoru Yamasaki (Japanese: 山崎 實, Hepburn: Yamasaki Minoru; December 1, 1912 – February 6, 1986) was an American architect, best known for designing the original World Trade Center in New York City and several other large-scale projects. He and fellow architect Edward Durell Stone are generally considered to be the two master practitioners of "New Formalism".

During his three-decade career, he and his firm designed over 250 buildings. His firm, Yamasaki & Associates, closed on December 31, 2009.

== Early life and education ==
Yamasaki was born on December 1, 1912, in Seattle, Washington, the son of John Tsunejiro Yamasaki and Hana Yamasaki, issei Japanese immigrants. The family later moved to Auburn, Washington, and he graduated from Garfield Senior High School in Seattle. He enrolled in the University of Washington program in architecture in 1929, and graduated with a Bachelor of Architecture (BArch) in 1934. During his college years, he was strongly encouraged by faculty member Lionel Pries. He earned money to pay for his tuition by working at a salmon cannery in Alaska, working five summers and earning $50 a month, plus 25 cents an hour in overtime pay.

In part to escape anti-Japanese prejudice, he moved to Manhattan in 1934, with $40 and no job prospects. He wrapped dishes for an importing company until he found work as a draftsman and engineer. He graduated from New York University with master's degree in architecture, and subsequently joining the architecture firm Shreve, Lamb & Harmon, designers of the Empire State Building. The firm helped Yamasaki avoid internment as a Japanese-American during World War II, and he himself sheltered his parents in New York City. Yamasaki was politically active during his early years, particularly in efforts to relocate Japanese Americans affected by the internment program in the United States during World War II.

After leaving Shreve, Lamb & Harmon, Yamasaki worked briefly for Harrison & Abramovitz and Raymond Loewy. During his time with Harrison & Abramovitz, Yamasaki, a gifted watercolorist, also taught drawing at Columbia University.

In 1945, Yamasaki moved to Detroit, where he secured a position with Smith, Hinchman & Grylls (SHG) as the chief designer. At the time, SHG was the oldest as well as one of the largest and most prestigious architectural firms in Detroit and the United States, with recently completed projects including Detroit landmarks such as the Penobscot and Guardian Buildings. Yamasaki left the firm in 1949, and started his own partnership. He worked from Birmingham and Troy, Michigan. One of the first projects he designed at his own firm was Ruhl's Bakery at 7 Mile Road and Monica Street in Detroit.

== Career ==
=== Pruitt–Igoe and other early commissions ===
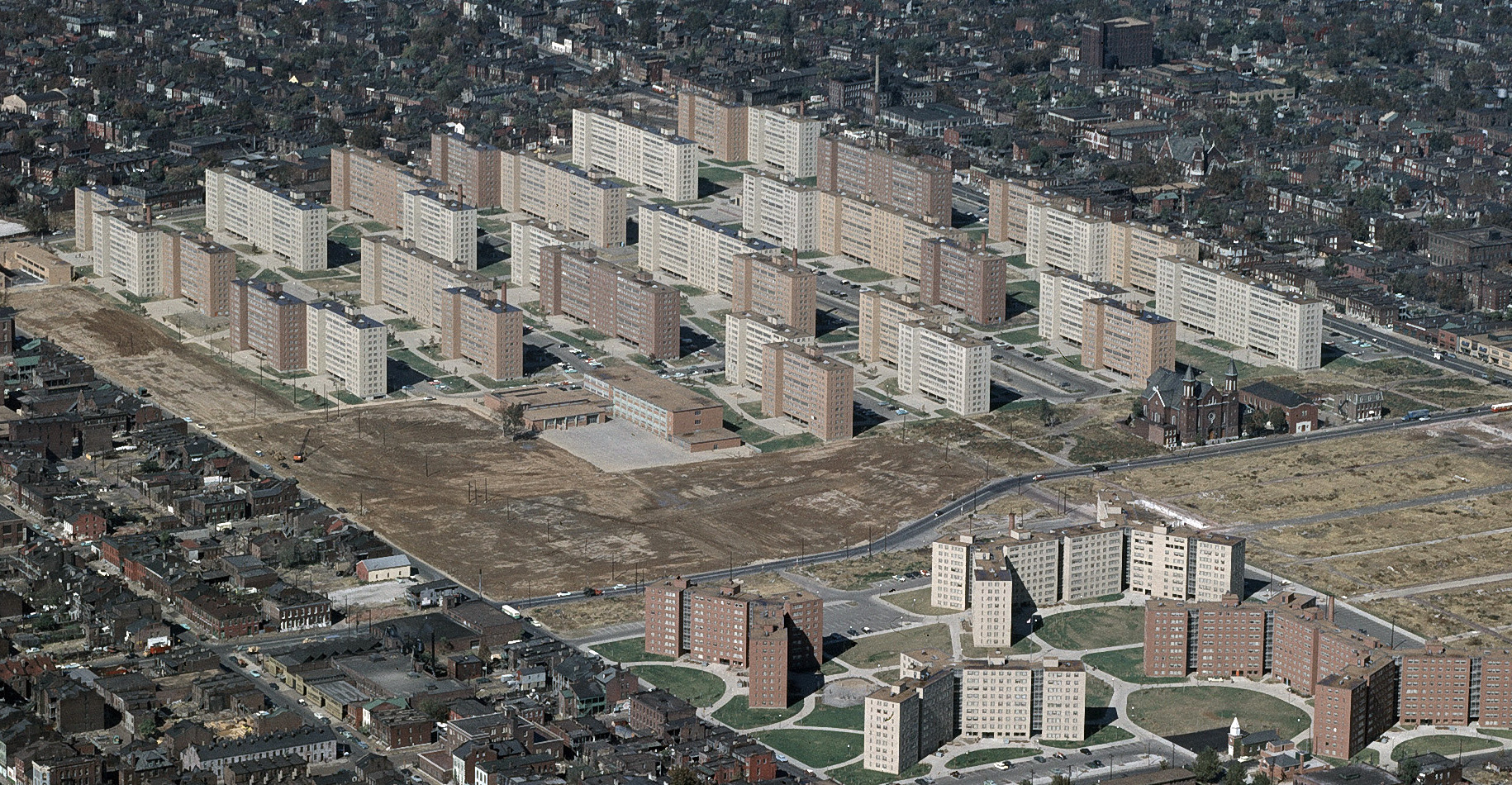
Pruitt–Igoe housing project, St. Louis, 1954 (demolished 1972–1976)

Yamasaki's first major project was the Pruitt–Igoe public housing project in St. Louis in 1955. Despite his love of traditional Japanese design and ornamentation, the buildings of Pruitt–Igoe were stark, modernist concrete structures, severely constricted by a tight budget. The housing project soon experienced so many problems that it was demolished starting in 1972, less than twenty years after its completion. Its destruction would be considered by architectural historian Charles Jencks to be the symbolic end of modernist architecture.

In the 1950s, Yamasaki was commissioned by the Reynolds Company to design an aluminum-wrapped building in Southfield, Michigan, which would "symbolize the auto industry's past and future progress with aluminum." The three-story glass building wrapped in aluminum, known as the Reynolds Metals Company's Great Lakes Sales Headquarters Building, was also supposed to reinforce the company's main product and showcase its admirable characteristics of strength and beauty.

In 1955, he designed the "sleek" terminal at Lambert–St. Louis International Airport, which led to his 1959 commission to design the Dhahran International Airport in Saudi Arabia. The Dhahran International Airport terminal building was especially well received in Saudi Arabia and was featured on the one riyal bank note.

Yamasaki's first widely-acclaimed design was the Pacific Science Center, with its iconic lacy and airy decorative arches. It was constructed by the City of Seattle for the 1962 Seattle World's Fair. The building raised his public profile so much that he was featured on the cover of Time magazine.

Yamasaki was a member of the Pennsylvania Avenue Commission, created in 1961 to restore the grand avenue in Washington, D.C., but he resigned after disagreements and disillusionment with the design by committee approach.

The campus for the University of Regina was designed in tandem with Yamasaki's plan for Wascana Centre, a park built around Wascana Lake in Regina, Saskatchewan. The original campus design was approved in 1962. Yamasaki was awarded contracts to design the first three buildings: the Classroom Building, the Laboratory Building, and the Dr. John Archer Library, which were built between 1963 and 1967.

Yamasaki designed two notable synagogues, North Shore Congregation Israel in Glencoe, Illinois (1964), and Temple Beth El, in Bloomfield Hills, Michigan (1973).

He designed a number of buildings on college campuses, including designs for Carleton College in Northfield, Minnesota, and a building in Waikiki, in Honolulu, Hawaii, between 1958 and 1968. He was also commissioned to design buildings on the campus of Wayne State University in Detroit in the 1950s and 1960s, including the McGregor Memorial Conference Center, the College of Education building and the Prentis Building and DeRoy Auditorium Complex. The buildings at Wayne State University incorporated many architectural motifs that would become characteristic elements in Yamasaki's designs.

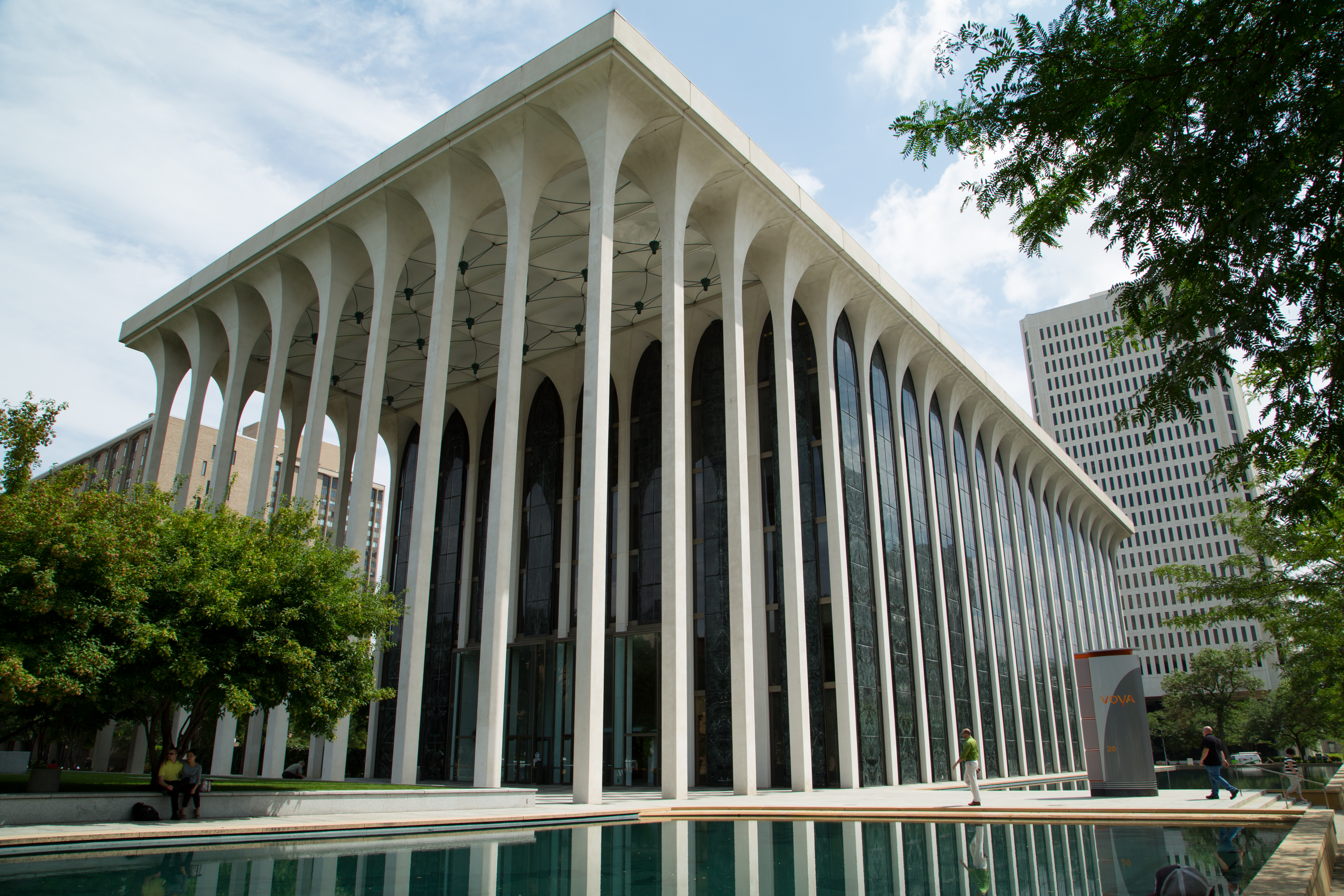
The Northwestern National Life building, Minneapolis, 1965

With regards to the McGregor Memorial Conference Center, this included placing the building on an elevated base or pedestal to emphasize its presence, repeated geometric patterns on the exterior facade of the building (many times these exterior design features were functional as well, providing structural support to the building). He also used exotic materials such as white marble tiles and columns, incorporated a skylight traversing the length of the building and made extensive use of the secondary space outside the building including constructing a plaza with reflecting pools, seating areas, greenery and sculptures. The College of Education building featured repeating gothic arches throughout the exterior of the building which were both ornamental but also provided structural support for the building.

=== World Trade Center ===
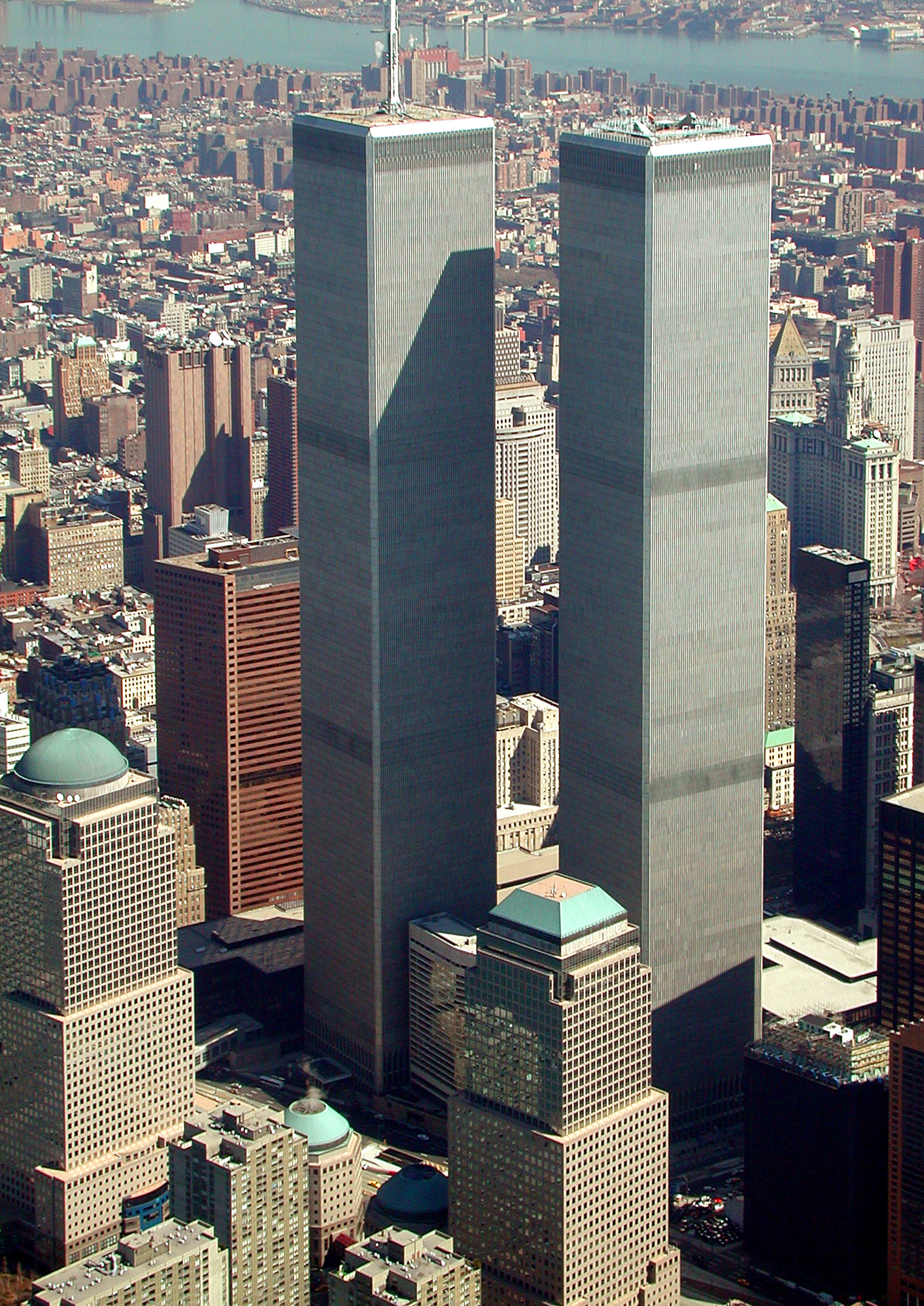
The original World Trade Center (1973–2001) was the most widely-known of Yamasaki's buildings.

In 1962 Yamasaki and his firm were commissioned to design his most well-known project: the World Trade Center, with Emery Roth & Sons serving as associate architects. The World Trade Center towers featured many innovative design elements to address many unique challenges at the site.

One particular design challenge related to the efficacy of the elevator system, which became unique in the world when it was first opened for service. Yamasaki employed the fastest elevators at the time, running at 1,700 feet (520 m) per minute. Instead of placing a traditional large cluster of full-height elevator shafts in the core of each tower, Yamasaki created the Twin Towers' "Skylobby" system. The Skylobby design created three separate, connected elevator systems which would serve different zones of the building, depending on which floor was chosen, saving approximately 70% of the space which would have been required for traditional shafts. The space saved was then used for additional office space. Internally, each office floor was a vast open space unimpeded by support columns, ready to be subdivided as the tenants might choose.

Other design challenges included anchoring the massively tall towers to the bedrock located about 80 feet (24 m) below lower Manhattan's soft soil. Digging a large trench to the bedrock risked flooding from nearby New York Harbor. The solution employed by Yamasaki and his team of engineers was to use a slurry wall; digging very narrow trenches about 3 feet (0.91 m) wide and then filling these with a slurry (a mixture of clay and water) that was dense enough to keep the surrounding water out. Pipes were then lowered into the slurry trench and concrete was pumped in. The concrete, being more dense than the slurry, sank to the bottom of the trenches all the way down to the bedrock displacing the slurry to the surface, where it was drained away. This process was repeated around the entire perimeter of the site and reinforced with steel cables to create a watertight concrete bathtub surrounding the excavation site. This slurry wall system had only been employed a few times prior in the United States and never on such a large project.

A further design challenge was developing a wind-bracing system to keep the ultra tall but relatively lightweight steel and glass structures from swaying at their upper levels. Other contemporary modern skyscrapers had used centrally located cross-bracing systems located in the core of the interiors at the upper levels, but Yamasaki and structural engineer Fazlur Rahman Khan employed an exterior truss system; a network of vertical and horizontal structural elements on the exterior of the towers giving them structural support. This external structural support system also decreased the need for large internal pillars. The external truss support system and the unique elevator configuration created more rentable space in the World Trade Centers to satisfy the owner's (The Port Authority of New York and New Jersey) massive demand for 10,000,000 square feet (930,000 m^{2}) of office space.

The first of the towers was finished in 1970. Many of his buildings feature superficial details inspired by the pointed arches of Gothic architecture, and make use of extremely narrow vertical windows. This narrow-windowed style arose from his own personal fear of heights. After partnering with Emery Roth and Sons on the design of the World Trade Center, the collaboration continued with other projects including new buildings at Bolling Air Force Base in Washington, D.C.

Yamasaki designed the BOK Tower in Tulsa, Oklahoma with a similar design to the World Trade Center. It was completed in 1976 and was the tallest building in Oklahoma at the time.

He also designed the M&T Bank headquarters in Buffalo, New York. He was hired in 1963 by the bank after he was selected to design the World Trade Center. The bank headquarters, known as One M&T Plaza, share a similar design to the WTC and was completed in 1967, before the WTC was completed. With the M&T Building, Yamasaki incorporated a design that was later fully realized in his design for the World Trade Center in New York. The building’s vertical support-columned exterior with larger, elongated windows at the top floors allow for expansive, openwork spaces with no interior columns.

=== Later years ===
After criticism of his dramatically cantilevered Rainier Tower (1977) in Seattle, Yamasaki became less adventurous in his designs during the last decade of his career.

In 1978, Yamasaki designed the Federal Reserve Bank tower in Richmond, Virginia. The work was designed with a similar external appearance as the World Trade Center complex, with its narrow fenestration, and stands at 394 ft (120 m).

== Legacy ==
Despite the many buildings he completed, Yamasaki's reputation faded along with the overall decline of modernism towards the end of the 20th century. Two of his major projects, the Pruitt-Igoe public housing complex, and the original World Trade Center, shared the dubious symbolic distinction of being destroyed while recorded by live TV broadcasts. The World Trade Center towers were not well received by some commentators at the time of their debut, with noted New York Times architectural critic Ada Louise Huxtable criticizing the towers as being "pure technology, the lobbies are pure schmaltz and the impact on New York of 110-story buildings...is pure speculation" and their gothic exterior branches at the lower levels as "General Motors gothic". In many ways, these best-known works ran counter to Yamasaki's own design principles, and he later regretted his reluctant acceptance of architectural compromises dictated by the clients of these projects. Several of his other buildings have also been demolished.

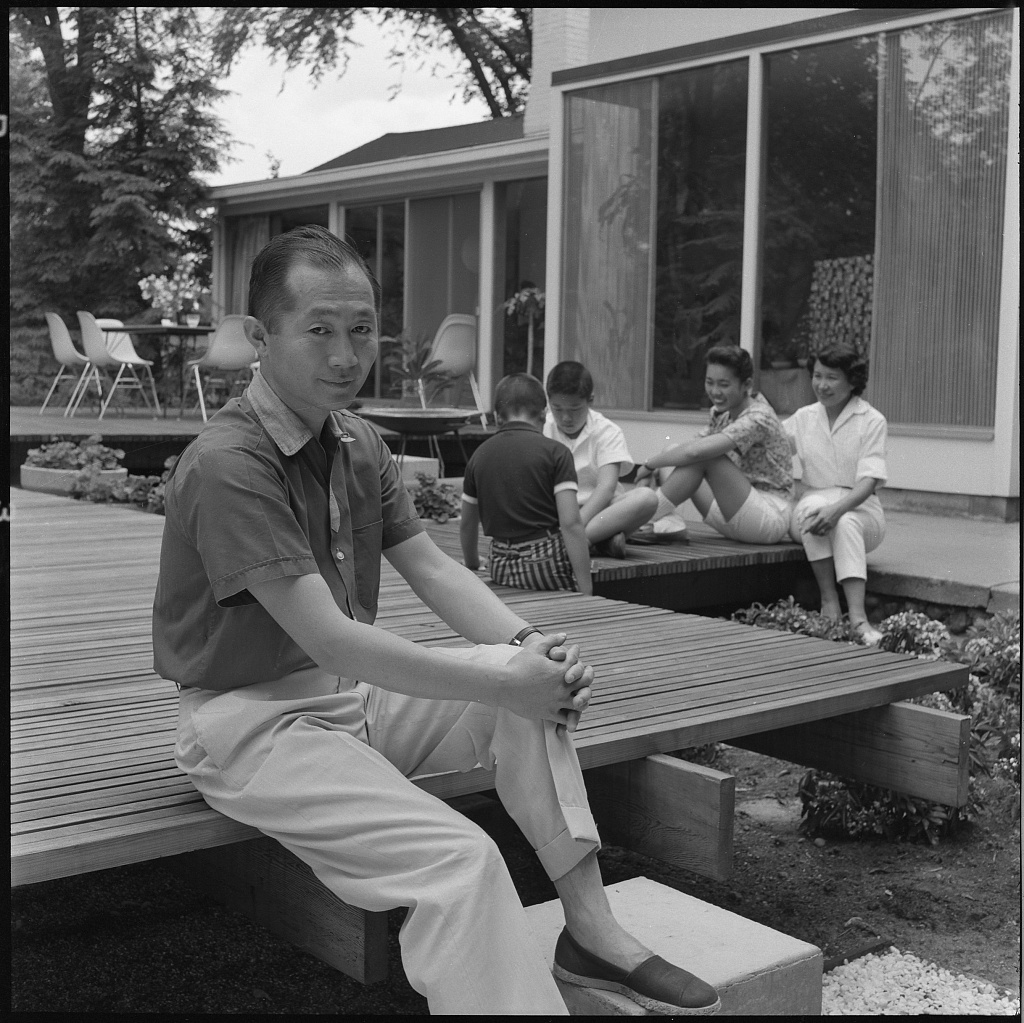
Yamasaki with his family at their house in Troy in 1967

Yamasaki collaborated closely with structural engineers, including John Skilling, Leslie Robertson, Fazlur Rahman Khan, and Jack V. Christiansen, to produce some of his innovative architectural designs. He strove to achieve "serenity, surprise, and delight" in his humanistic modernist buildings and their surrounds.

Decades after his death, Yamasaki's buildings and legacy would be re-assessed more sympathetically by some architectural critics. Several of his buildings have now been restored in accordance with his original designs, and his McGregor Memorial Conference Center was awarded National Historic Landmark status in 2015.

== Personal life ==
Yamasaki was first married in 1941 to Teruko "Teri" Hirashiki. They had three children together: Carol, Taro, and Kim. They divorced in 1961 and Yamasaki married Peggy Watty. He and Watty divorced two years later, and Yamasaki married a third time briefly before remarrying Teruko in 1969. In a 1969 article in The Detroit News about the remarriage, Yamasaki said "I'm just going to be nicer to her".

Yamasaki suffered from health problems for at least three decades, and ulcers caused surgical removal of much of his stomach in 1953. Over time, he endured several more operations on his stomach. His health was not improved by increasingly heavy drinking towards the end of his life. Yamasaki died of stomach cancer on February 6, 1986, at the age of 73.

Yamasaki was affectionately known as "Yama" among his friends and associates.

== Honors ==
- Fellow of the American Institute of Architects, 1963
- DFA from Bates College, 1964
- American Institute of Architects' First Honor Award, three times
- Cover story of TIME on January 18, 1963

== See also ==
- Construction of the World Trade Center
- List of works by Minoru Yamasaki
