= Washington Building =

Washington Building may refer to:

- Washington Building (Culver City, California), listed on the National Register of Historic Places in Los Angeles County, California
- Elyria High School - Washington Building, Elyria, Ohio, listed on the National Register of Historic Places in Lorain County, Ohio
- International Mercantile Marine Company Building, 1 Broadway, Manhattan, originally the Washington Building
- Washington Gas and Electric Building, Longview, Washington, listed on the National Register of Historic Places in Cowlitz County, Washington
- Washington Building (Richmond, Virginia)
- Washington Building (Seattle), see Puget Sound Plaza
