= Skinner Building =

Skinner Building may refer to:

- Skinner Building (Albuquerque, New Mexico), listed on the National Register of Historic Places in Bernalillo County, New Mexico
- Skinner Building (Seattle), listed on the National Register of Historic Places in King County, Washington
