= John Skilling =

American architect

John Skilling (October 8, 1921 in Los Angeles, California – March 5, 1998 in Seattle, Washington) was a civil engineer and architect, best known for being the chief structural engineer of the World Trade Center.

== Early life ==
John Skilling graduated from the University of Washington in 1947 with a B.S. in civil engineering and started working for an engineering firm called W.H. Witt Co, which is now known as Magnusson Klemencic Associates. He married at a young age and had three children—two girls and a boy.

== Engineering work ==
John started working for the W.H.Witt Co. soon after graduation. In 1983, he became the chairman of the firm. Prominent constructions under his leadership include the World Trade Center, Rainier Bank Tower, the Seafirst Building, Seafirst Fifth Avenue Tower, Century Square, Columbia Seafirst Center and the Washington State Convention and Trade Center.

== Seattle Times interview ==
In 1993 after the 1993 World Trade Center bombing, John Skilling said in an interview to the Seattle Times that according to their studies the World Trade Center was strong enough to withstand the impact of a Boeing 707. The only thing they were worried about was, in case of an airplane crash, the dumping of all airfuel into the building which would cause a horrendous fire. The building structure would still be there.
