= Unico Properties =

American private equity real estate investment and development company

- Type: Private
- Predecessor: University Properties Inc
- Founded: 1953
- Founder: Roger L. Stevens, Alfred R. Glancy Jr., Ben Tobin, and H. Adams Ashforth
- Headquarters: 1215 Fourth Avenue, Suite 600, Seattle, United States
- Key people: Quentin Kuhrau (CEO and Chairman of the Board); Jonas Sylvester(President)
- Total assets: $4.3 billion

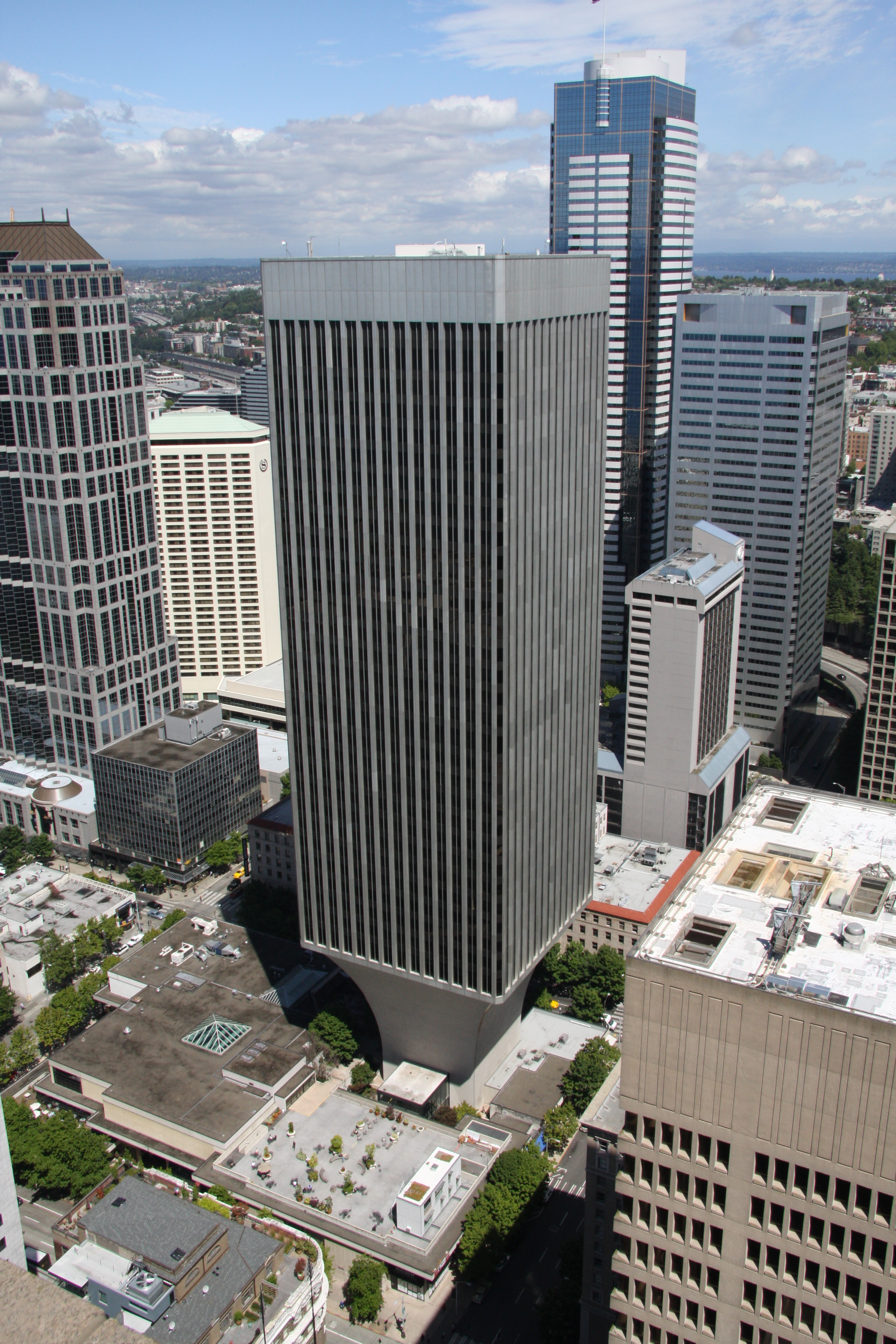
Rainier Tower, Seattle

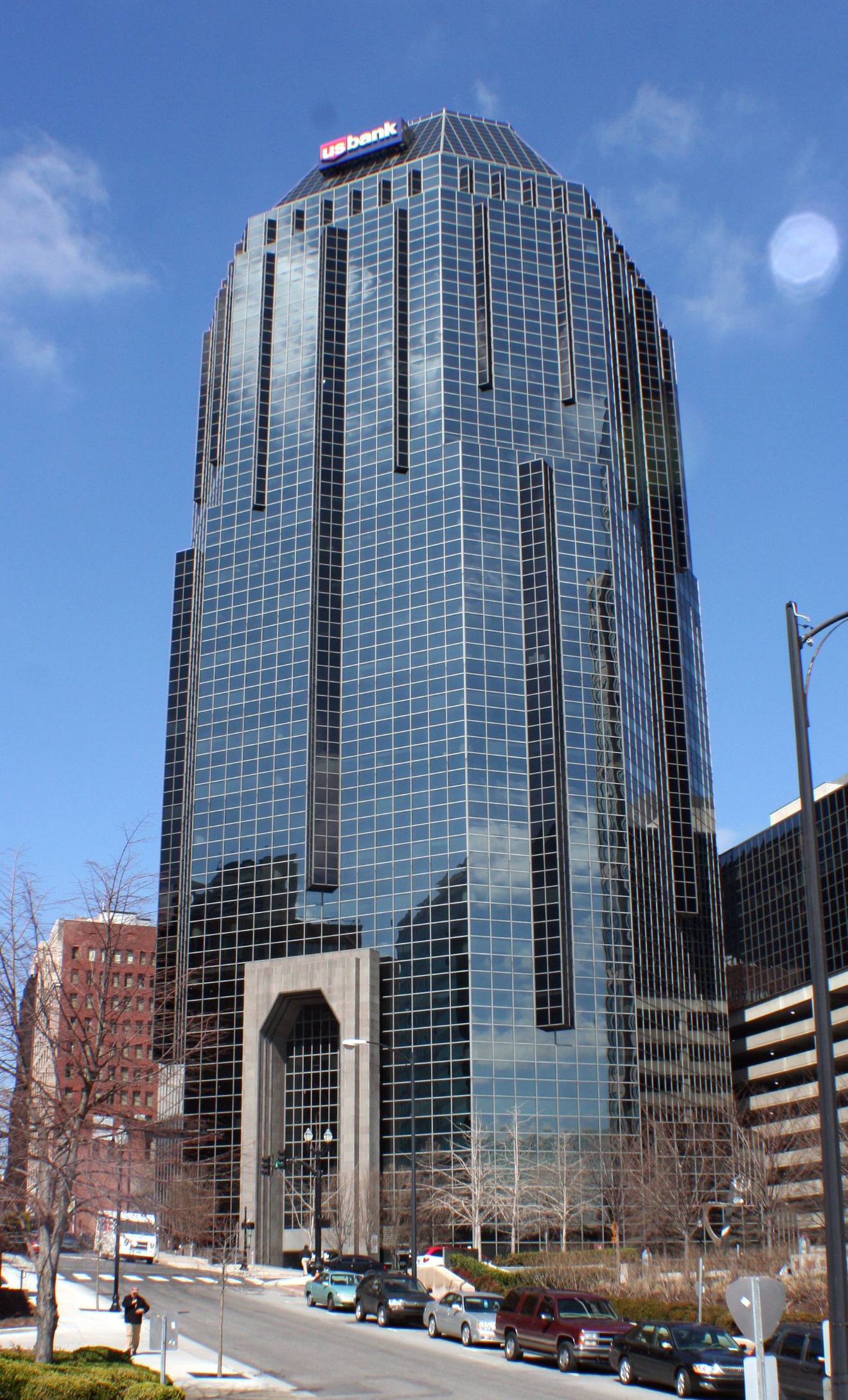
One Nashville Place in Nashville, Tennessee

Unico Properties LLC (formerly University Properties Inc) is an American private equity real estate investment and development company based in Seattle, Washington, focused on the north-west and west of the US. It was founded in 1953.

As of September 2018, it manages a $4.3 billion real-estate portfolio, amounting to 18 million square feet (1,700,000 m^{2}).

Unico was founded in 1953, by Roger L. Stevens, Alfred R. Glancy Jr., Ben Tobin, and H. Adams Ashforth, who were chosen by the University of Washington to manage and develop the 10-acre (4.0 ha) Metropolitan Tract in downtown Seattle.

Developments in Seattle have included the Rainier Tower, Puget Sound Plaza, IBM Building (Seattle), Financial Center, One Union Square, and Two Union Square.

In September 2018, Unico purchased One Nashville Place in Nashville, Tennessee, for $139.5 million.
