= Skinner Building (Seattle) =

Building in Seattle, Washington, U.S.

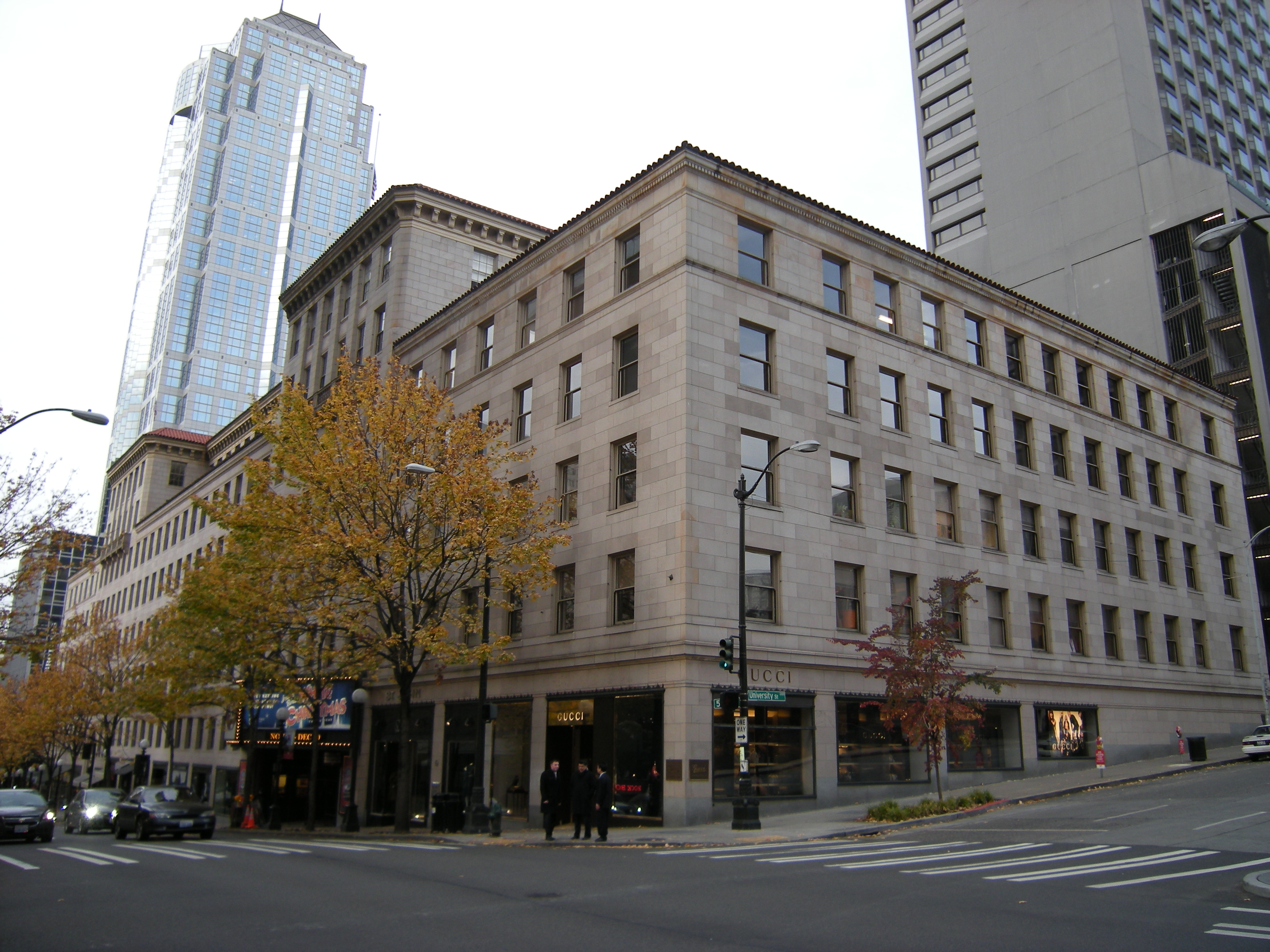
- The building's exterior in 2009
- Interactive map of the Skinner Building area

General information
- Architectural style: Italian Renaissance Revival
- Location: 1326 5th Avenue, Seattle, Washington, U.S.
- Coordinates: 47°36′34″N 122°20′2″W
- Completed: 1926

Technical details
- Floor count: 8

Design and construction
- Architect: Robert Reamer

U.S. National Register of Historic Places
- Designated: November 28, 1978
- Reference no.: 78002756

The Skinner Building is an eight-story building in Seattle, in the U.S. state of Washington, which includes the historic 5th Avenue Theatre at its southern end. Part of the Metropolitan Tract, the structure is listed on the National Register of Historic Places for the architecture of the interior theatre and of the rest of the building. The exterior features an unadorned sandstone facade with a false loggia and red mission tile roof.

The building was constructed in 1926, designed by the architecture firm of Robert Reamer in the Italian Renaissance Revival style. The majority of the surrounding buildings constructed in the Metropolitan Tract have since been replaced with modern structures; only about four original buildings remain, retained due to public intervention.

== Description ==
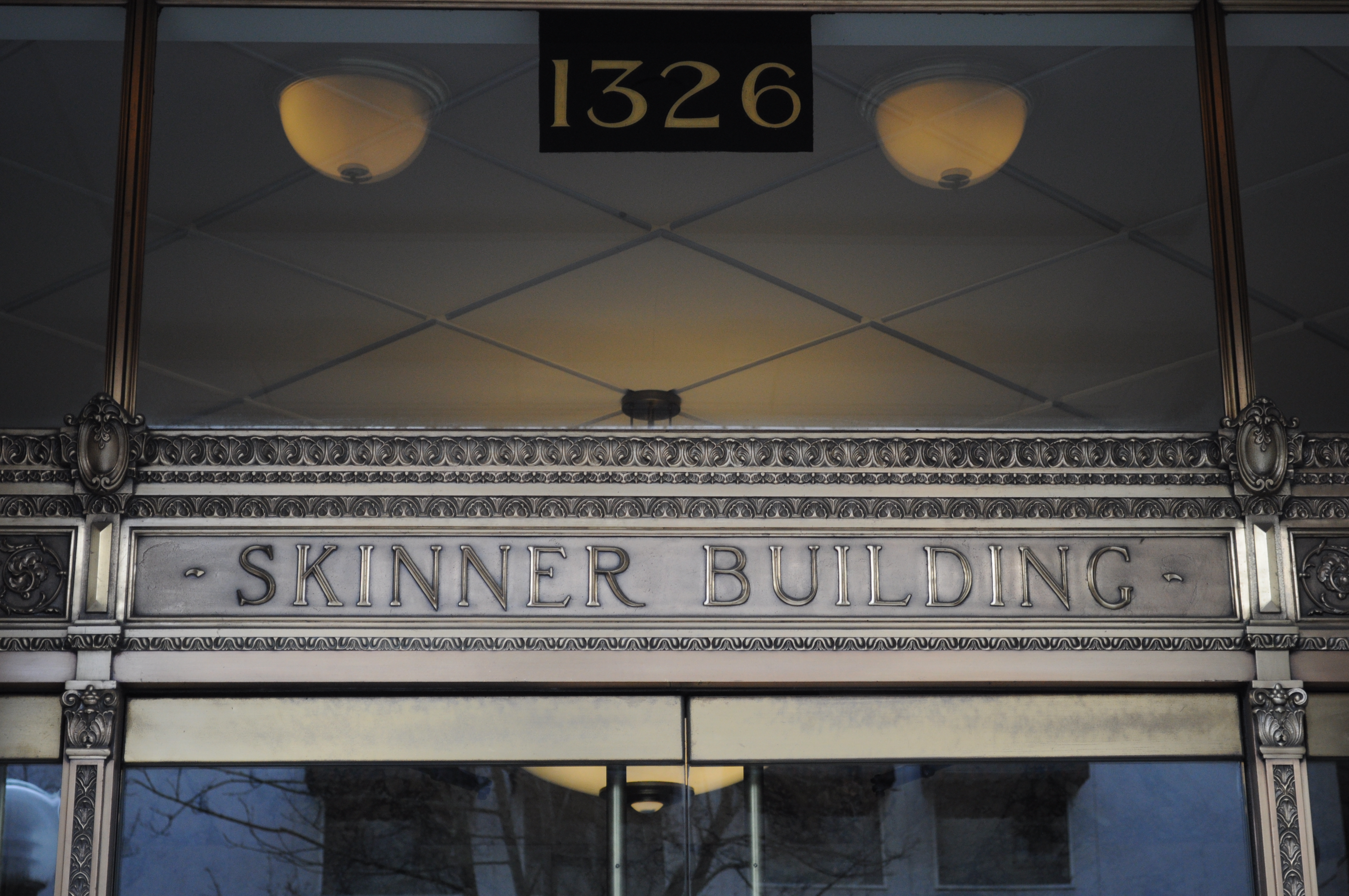
The Fifth Avenue entrance, 2012

Named after industrialist David E. Skinner, the eight-story Skinner Building exhibits a "restrained" Italian Renaissance revival design. It is an E-shaped mixed-use building with offices on the upper floors and retail space on the ground floor and basement level. The theatre entrance and box office are located at 1308 Fifth Avenue. The main entrance to the Skinner Building is at 1326 Fifth Avenue, where there is a plaque dedicating the Skinner Chimes in memory of philanthropist David E. "Ned" Skinner II (1920–1988). The chimes, which can be heard daily at noon in the downtown Seattle area, are actually an electronic carillon.

According to the National Register of Historic Places nomination form, "The building is faced with Wilkeson sandstone and displays excellent cut-stonework on three street front facades. It also possesses quality metal detailing around exterior show windows and shop entrances, as well as in its lobby. Interior details include rinceau friezes above the elevator door frames and decorative newel! posts on the staircase... Hipped parapets of red mission tile are visible on all roof surfaces from the ground and the projecting cornices of the seventh story are supported by handsome consoles. As an urban design element, this restrained, elegant building plays a strong role in the sophisticated, pedestrianized qualities of Fifth Avenue and creates an excellent street wall with its low key, block long unity."

HistoryLink says, "Despite the Skinner Building's rather conservative exterior, the interior of the 5th Avenue marked it as one of the most lavish theaters on all the West Coast." The automated chimes are at the top of the building. The Skinner Building has Douglas fir sash and frames. An underground pedestrian passage stretching three blocks connect the Skinner Building, Hilton Seattle, and the Washington Athletic Club.

The book Shaping Seattle Architecture says architect Robert Reamer "incorporated classical sensibilities in his design" for the building.

== History ==
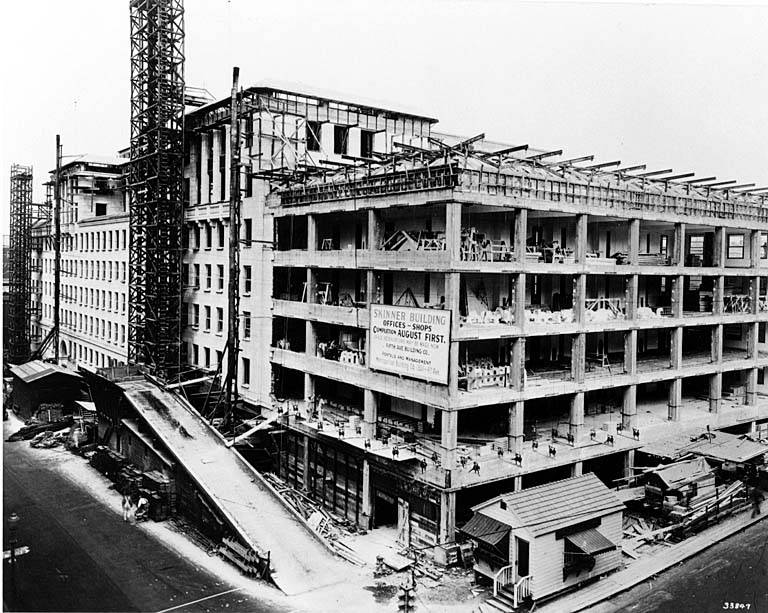
Building construction c. 1926

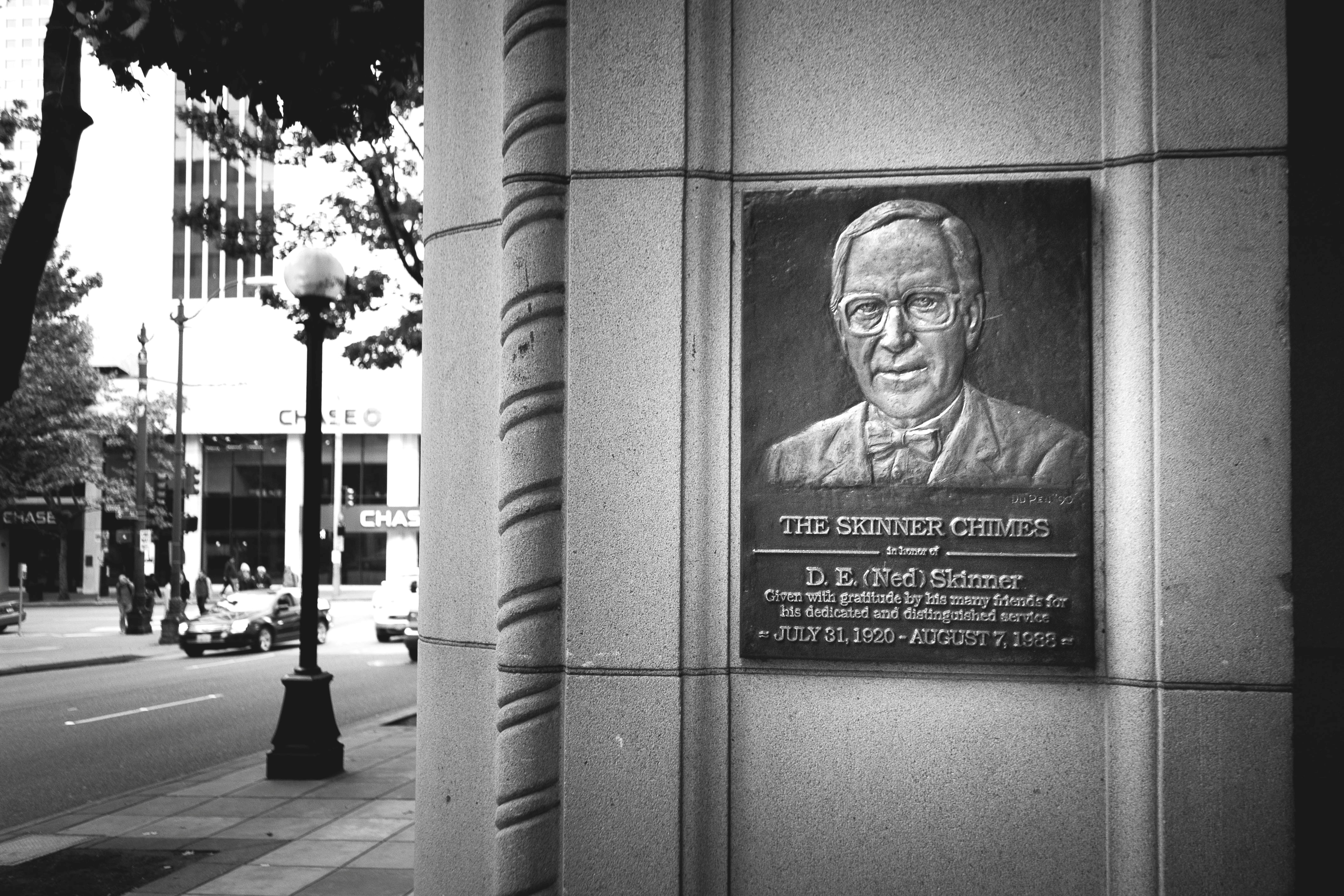
Plaques commemorating David E. "Ned" Skinner II and referencing the Skinner Chimes, 2013

Reamer was hired to design the Skinner Building around 1925. The commission followed the Metropolitan Building Company hiring his firm to design the Olympic Hotel, though the hotel operators refused to allow anyone except its company architects to design it. Therefore the Metropolitan hired him as a house architect. His first major work was the Skinner Building, a successful transposing of the Italian Renaissance style into a city office block.

The Skinner Building was completed in 1926. Sandstone was quarried from near Mount Rainier. The structure was featured in the February 28, 1927 issue of Buildings and Building Management. An opening night program read:

The Skinner Building—in shops where are marketed together foreign wares and domestic merchandise; in offices, where are administered businesses with extensions over the Seven Seas; in the theater, where are combined the arts of Old World and the New to work a magic of delight—here in this stately edifice, the twain do meet. At the Gateway to the Orient the Skinner Building stands dedicated to the commerce and trade of two great Continents.

In the 1930s, the building was home to two radio stations owned by Fisher Companies: KOMO and KJR, both NBC affiliates. By September 1983, the building was seen as adverse to the quality and marketability of the Metropolitan Tract area. It was suggested that the building be demolished toward the end of the century, along with the Cobb Building. Allied Arts Foundation began a coalition to save the Cobb Building, which was proposed to be demolished sooner, in the late 1980s. Amid the uncertainty, Fred Bassetti and others proposed a new historic district be created, including the Skinner, White Henry Stuart, Olympic Hotel, and the Cobb Building.

In the 2000s, the building received a $11 million seismic upgrade. The Skinner Building is LEED-EB (LEED for Existing Buildings) certified as of 2010. Unico Properties has been the property manager since at least 1997.

=== Tenants ===
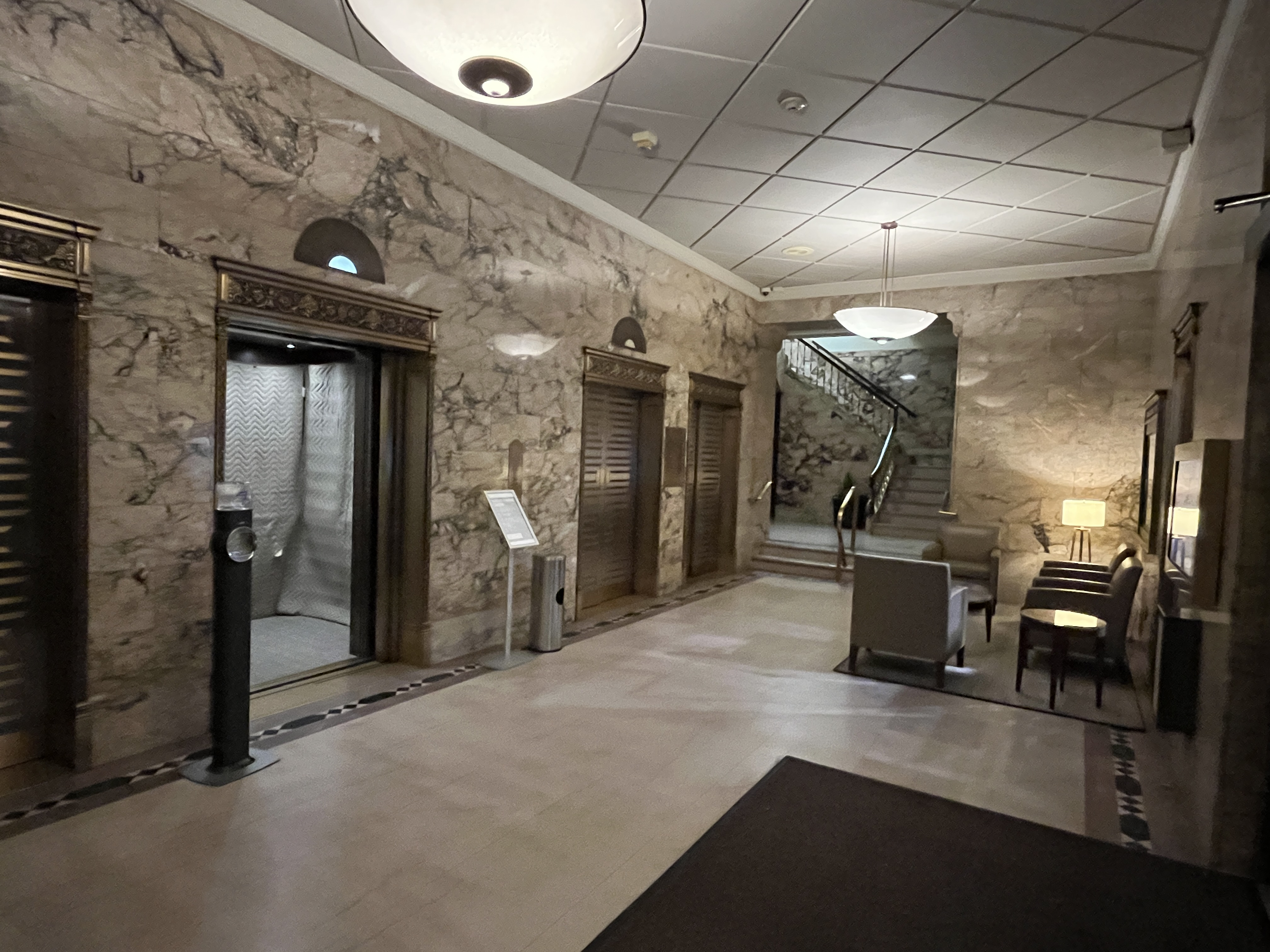
Interior lobby, 2022

The Alaska Pacific Salmon Company, Bristol Bay Packing Company, and I. Magnin have been tenants. Architects Paul Thiry, John I. Mattson, and Leonard W. Bindon have also been tenants. The National Canners Association and the Seattle Milk Dealers' Association have had offices in the building.

In the 1940s, the building housed the Region VII headquarters of the Federal Public Housing Authority, a federal agency created as part of the New Deal. The John Doyle Bishop Salon operated on the fourth floor from August 1976 to 1980. The retail company Eddie Bauer was a tenant as of 1997. In 2008, the marketing firm Pop signed an eleven-year lease for the top floor. The clothing retailer Brooks Brothers opened a 15,000-square-foot (1,400 m^{2}) store in the building c. 2005, which continues to operate as of 2014.

== Reception ==
In Seattle Architecture (1953), Victor Steinbrueck said the building is "outstanding for precise detailing". In his 1994 book Seeing Seattle, Roger Sale calls the building and theatre "jewels" of the Metropolitan Tract. He complimented the building's "elegant" and "unadorned" sandstone, as well as the simplicity of the façade. Sale said the building is among Seattle's "finest". In her book Best Places Seattle (1999), Giselle Smith called the Skinner Building "exquisite". The structure has also been described as a "handsome office building". In 1984, Seattle architect Ibsen Nelsen considered the Skinner the most important preservation issue in Seattle and one of the most crucially important buildings in the city, saying its block-long facade is "the very heart of our downtown", a facade that cannot be improved upon.

== See also ==
- National Register of Historic Places listings in Seattle
