= LLLT =

LLLT may be an initialism for:

- Limited license legal technician
- Low-level laser therapy
