= 1200 Fifth =

Building in Seattle, Washington, USA

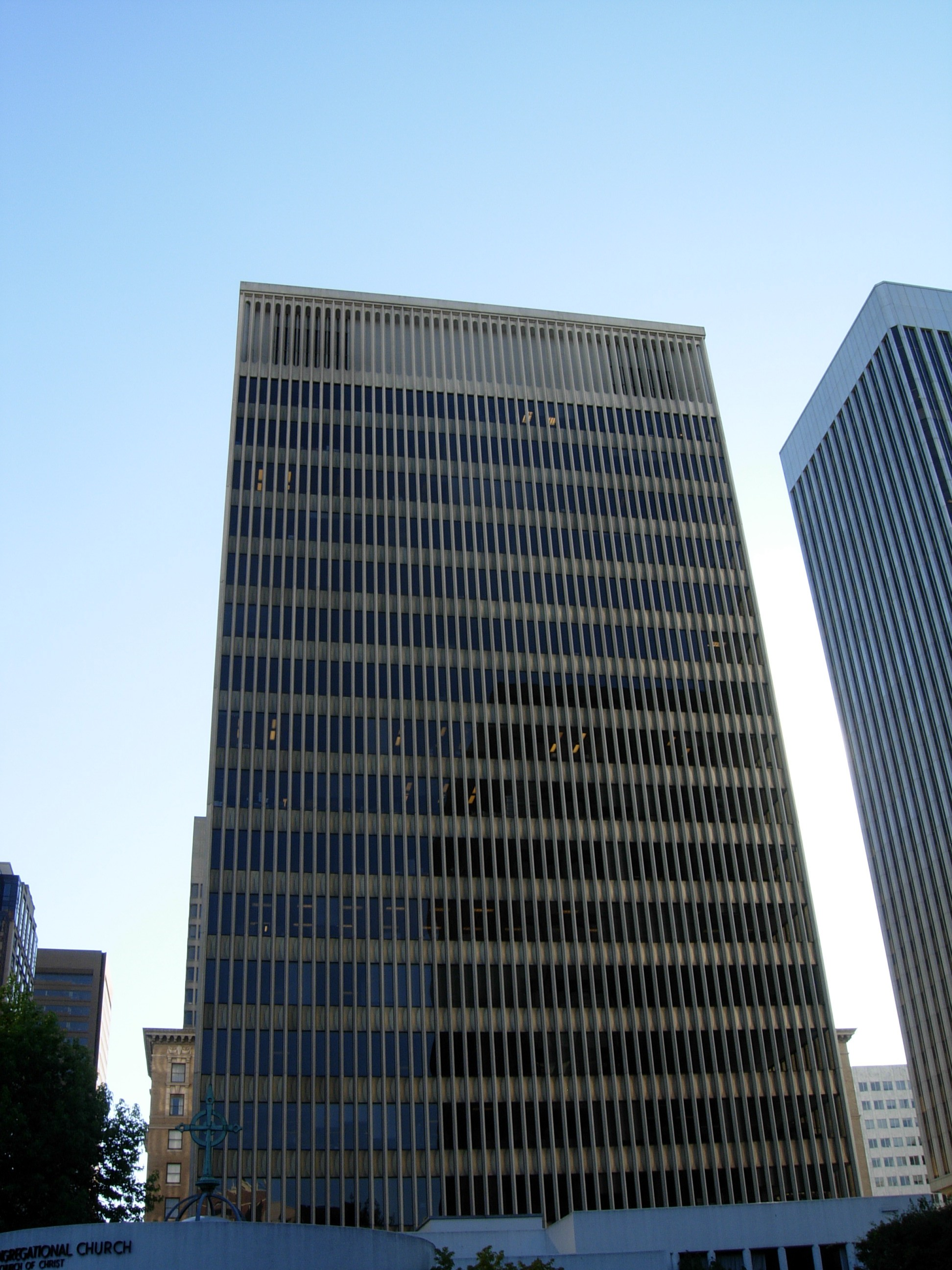

- Location within Downtown Seattle
- Former names: IBM Building

General information
- Type: Commercial offices
- Location: 1200 Fifth Avenue; Seattle, Washington, 98101
- Coordinates: 47.608398°N 122.332935°W
- Construction started: May 1963
- Completed: October 1964
- Owner: Unico Properties

Height
- Roof: 84.13 m (276.0 ft)

Technical details
- Floor count: 20
- Floor area: 225,000 sq ft (20,900 m^{2})

Design and construction
- Architects: Minoru Yamasaki; NBBJ
- Structural engineer: Magnusson Klemencic Associates
- Main contractor: Howard S. Wright Companies

1200 Fifth, formerly the IBM Building, is a 20-story office building in the Metropolitan Tract, part of downtown Seattle, Washington, United States. The building was designed by Minoru Yamasaki, who also was architect of Rainier Tower on the corner diagonally opposite, and the World Trade Center in New York City. Yamasaki also designed the surrounding plaza, and had been interested in public spaces after spending the beginning of his career in New York City, where he was influenced by the Rockefeller Center. These public plazas later became a recurring feature in his work. Construction on the building began in May 1963 and it was completed in October 1964.

The base of the tower features arches that form 12 columns around the perimeter, which take the load of the bundled tube structure above and channel it into the substructure of a parking garage below the tower. The arches are true arches, meaning they are load bearing, not decorative. Above the arches are 18 stories of bundled tube facade, structured with high-strength steel tubes encased in white precast concrete sleeves. These sleeves both act as mullions and function as a sun shade system.

Nard Jones wrote in 1972 that "There is an architectural poetry about [the building] that is at variance with the endless jibes at computerization and the alleged sober pragmatism of IBM personnel." The building's crown has a series of 191 "fins" that measure 23 feet (7.0 m) tall and surround the machinery floors.

Corner detail at the plaza level in 2016, showing load-bearing concrete arches and precast concrete sleeve-clad steel tubing.

The corner of the complex at 5th Avenue and University Street was the site of the Seattle Ice Arena from 1915 to 1963.
