= Williams Kastner =

American law firm

- Headquarters: Seattle, Washington
- No. of offices: 2
- No. of attorneys: 70
- Major practice areas: Antitrust, Bankruptcy, Business Law, Class Actions, Commercial Litigation, Construction, Education, Environmental Law, Estate Planning, Health Care, Indian Law & Gaming, Labor & Employment, Land Use, Products Liability, Professional Liability, Real Estate, Securities, Tax, Toxic Torts
- Date founded: 1929
- Company type: PLLC
- Website: www.williamskastner.com

Williams Kastner headquarters at 601 Union Street, Seattle, WA

Williams Kastner is a law firm headquartered in the Two Union Square building in Seattle, Washington. The firm is ranked number 10 on the list of the Puget Sound area's largest law firms by the Puget Sound Business Journal.

== Overview ==
Williams Kastner has additional offices in Portland, Oregon and Spokane, Washington. It has a strategic affiliation with the Duan & Duan law firm, which has offices throughout China. The firm is generally known for representing and counseling industrial companies, financial institutions, private investment funds, government entities, educational institutions, charitable and cultural organizations, and individuals with estate and trust issues.

== Legal name ==
The legal name of the firm is Williams, Kastner & Gibbs PLLC, however the company markets itself as Williams Kastner. The company shortened its name to Williams Kastner in 2006 as part of a rebranding of the firm. Occasionally, the firm is colloquially referred to as Williams, Kastner & Gibbs or WK&G. Previous organization names include Eggerman & Rosling; Eggerman, Rosling & Williams; Rosling, Williams, Lanza & Kastner; and Williams, Lanza, Kastner & Gibbs.

== Recognition ==
- Nine lawyers from Williams Kastner were selected for the 2019 edition of The Best Lawyers in America.
- Williams Kastner was recognized by U.S. News – Best Lawyers “Best Law Firms” in 2019 in a total of 9 practice areas in Seattle and Portland.
- Fifteen lawyers from Williams Kastner were named to the 2018 Super Lawyers and Rising Stars Lists.
- Williams Kastner was honored with the 2018 Bridge to Healing Award by Safe Crossings Foundation (SCF). This award recognizes Williams Kastner’s influential role in helping thousands of grieving youth through funding special weekend grief camps, art therapy, suicide specific support and group counseling since SCF’s founding 30 years ago.
