= Union Square (Seattle) =

Skyscraper between Union and University Streets in Downtown Seattle, Washington

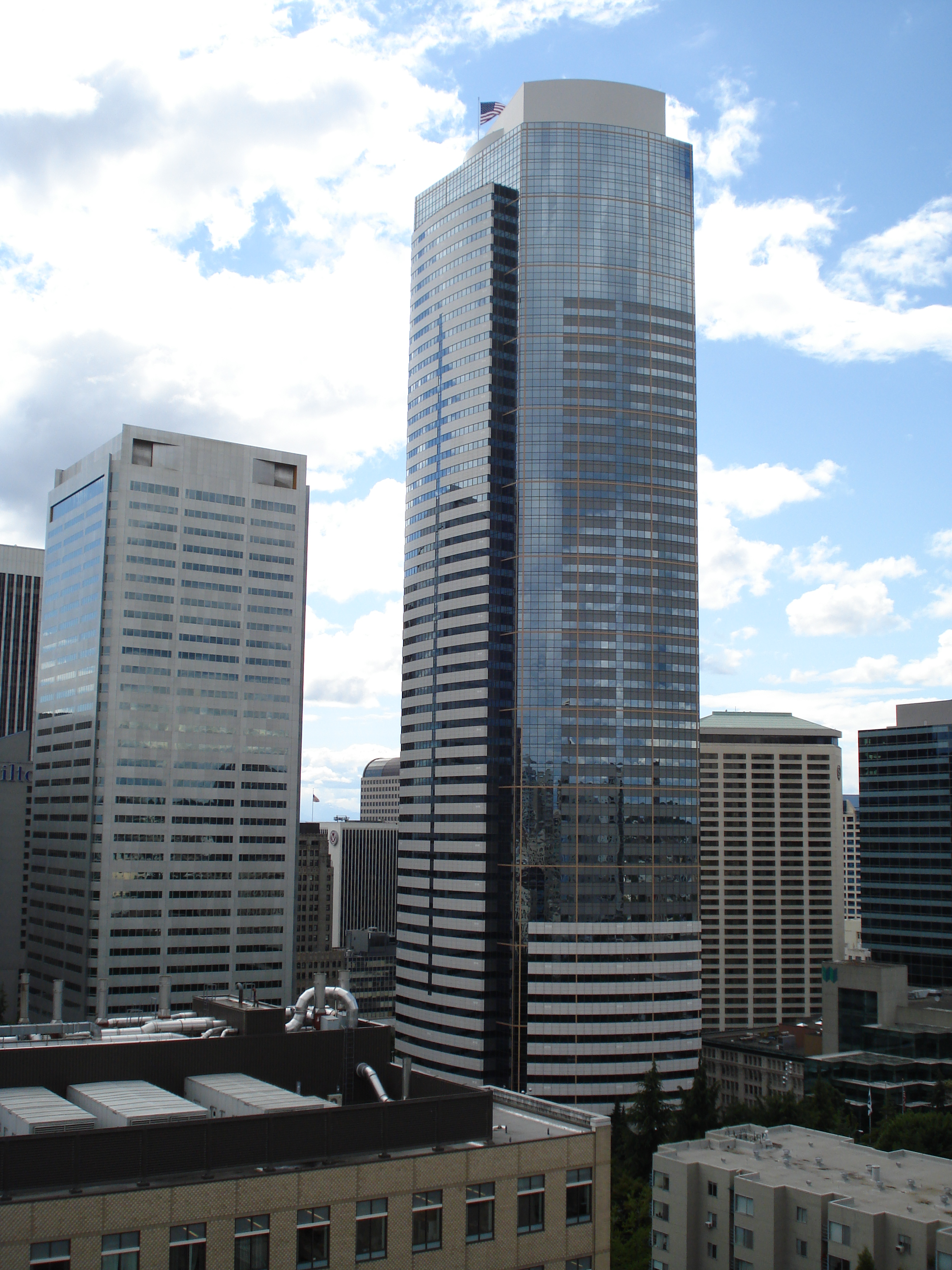

- Location within downtown Seattle

General information
- Type: Commercial offices
- Location: 600 University Street and 601 Union Street; Seattle, Washington
- Coordinates: 47.610°N 122.332°W
- Completed: One Union Square: 1981; Two Union Square: 1989
- Owner: Union Square LLC

Height
- Antenna spire: Two Union Square: 797 ft (243 m)
- Roof: One Union Square: 456 ft (139 m); Two Union Square: 741 ft (226 m)

Technical details
- Floor count: One Union Square: 36; Two Union Square: 56
- Floor area: Two Union Square: 1,126,400 sq ft (104,650 m^{2})

Design and construction
- Architects: TRA Architects; NBBJ
- Structural engineer: Magnusson Klemencic Associates
- Main contractor: Hoffman Construction Company; Turner Construction

References
- unionsquareseattle.com

Union Square is a skyscraper complex at Sixth Avenue between Union and University Streets in Downtown Seattle, Washington, adjacent to Freeway Park. It consists of two skyscrapers built in the 1980s and primarily used for office space. The entire complex features a 1,100-stall parking garage, a courtyard, a retail plaza spanning three stories and an underground pedestrian concourse that connects with the Fifth Avenue Theater and Rainier Square. Both structures were awarded LEED certification in 2009 and eventually received LEED Platinum certification 6 years later as a result of reduced annual energy consumption by 40 percent through recent renovations. The entire complex is currently managed by Washington Holdings, a real estate firm also known as Union Square LLC which is based in Seattle.

== Buildings ==
=== One Union Square ===
One Union Square is an aluminum clad 456-foot (139 m) skyscraper consisting of 36 floors with 2 floors below ground. Construction of this class A office building was completed 45 years ago in 1981. It is the first office building in Seattle to house all life-support systems in one location. The architect of One Union Square was TRA.

=== Two Union Square ===
Construction on Two Union Square began in 1987 and was complete by 1989. When accounting for the tip of the flag pole, the 797-foot (243 m) building is the third-tallest building in the Seattle skyline. The Seattle-based architectural firm NBBJ designed the tower, which was dedicated on July 29, 1989. Two Union Square has 56 floors with 1,126,428 square feet (104,649 m^{2}) of rentable space, and an underground concourse connecting to the Seattle Hilton Hotel, and shopping at Rainier Square. It is the first skyscraper to use 19,000 lbs/in.^{2} high-strength concrete.

== Tenants ==
- AB Berstein
- Alston, Courtnage & Bassetti LLP
- Apex Companies, LLC
- Apple, Inc.
- AmWins
- Arboretum Mortgage
- Avenue 55
- BDO
- Bennett, Bigelow & Leedom P.S.
- BlackRock Financial
- Bush Strout & Kornfeld
- Chapter 13 Trustee
- Colliers International
- Ederer Investment Company
- Edge Asset Management
- First Choice Health
- Flinn Ferguson
- Floyd|Snider
- Frazier Healthcare
- Gordon, Tilden, Thomas, Cordell
- GreaterGood Network
- HDR, Inc.
- Homestreet Bank
- Horizon Realty Advisors, LLC
- Integra Realty Resources
- Jones Lang LaSalle
- Kidder Mathews
- Kosmos Management
- Lasher Holzapfel Sperry & Ebberson
- LBA Realty
- Littler Mendelson, PC
- Lockton
- The Lyman Group
- Marcus & Millichap
- McNaul, Ebel, Hawrot & Nelgren PLLC
- Morgan Stanley Wealth Management
- National Bureau of Asian Research
- National Center for APEC
- Northwestern Mutual Financial Network
- Pacific Project Management (PPM)
- Paragon Real Estate Advisors
- Penrith Home Loans
- Pillar International Insurance Advisors
- Porter Foster Rorick LLP
- Protiviti
- Robert A. Underhill
- Robert Half International
- Sashen Ventures
- Seattle Chamber Music Society
- Stoel Rives LLP
- Taipei Economic and Cultural Office in Seattle
- USI Insurance Services Northwest
- Wedbush Securities
- Williams Kastner
- Willis Towers Watson

== See also ==
- List of tallest buildings in the United States
