= Washington State Bar Association =

American state bar association

- Type: Legal regulator
- Headquarters: Puget Sound Plaza; Seattle, Washington
- Location: U.S. state of Washington
- Members: 40,000+
- Website: www.wsba.org

The Washington State Bar Association (WSBA) is the state bar association of the U.S. state of Washington. It operates under the delegated authority of the Washington Supreme Court to license the state's nearly 41,000 active and inactive lawyers and other legal professionals. The WSBA's mission is to serve the public and the members of the Bar, to ensure the integrity of the legal profession, and to champion justice.

== History ==
In the days of Washington Territory, lawyers who had cases set for argument before the State Supreme Court were required to be present at the beginning of the Court term in January. Sometimes they waited for weeks for their cases to be called.

On January 19, 1888, a group of these lawyers met in the Supreme Court chambers to form the Washington Bar Association. This was a voluntary organization and did not include all lawyers admitted to practice; originally it consisted of 35 lawyers, at a cost of $5 a year. In 1890, the name changed to Washington State Bar Association.

In 1930, as more lawyers were admitted to practice, it was proposed that the Bar Association have a paid executive secretary and a paid representative in Olympia when the Legislature was meeting, that it have an official publication, and that it be incorporated. George McCush of Bellingham headed an Incorporation Committee to draft a Bar Association Act proposal. The committee proposed that the Bar Association be an agency of the state, creating "a complete integrated (i.e., mandatory membership) Bar which is officially organized, self-governed and all inclusive." The annual license fee would be $5. In 1933, after much debate and some redrafting, the legislature enacted the State Bar Act (Ch. 2.48 RCW).

According to its Bylaws, WSBA will not take positions on issues concerning the politics or social positions of foreign nations; take positions on political or social issues which do not relate to or affect the practice of law or the administration of justice; or support or oppose, in an election, candidates for public office.

=== Structure ===
Today, a 14-member Board of Governors (BOG), elected geographically, directs the WSBA. There is one governor for each of the 10 districts (except for the 7th District, which is divided into 7th-North and 7th-South), plus three at-large governors (one of whom must be a "young lawyer" as that term is defined under WSBA bylaws). The Board is elected solely by WSBA members, except for the at-large governors who are selected by the Board.

Annually, the Board selects a president-elect and elects one of its members as treasurer. It employs an executive director to carry out the purposes and functions of the Bar. The WSBA employs a staff of approximately 150.

=== Financing ===
WSBA is funded by mandatory license fees imposed upon Washington legal licensees by order of the Washington Supreme Court. At the time of an American Bar Association 2007 Dues and Mandatory Fees Survey, of the 32 mandatory state bars in the country, Washington's license fees rank near the middle among those states with comparable membership size (e.g., Michigan, Wisconsin, Georgia).

In 2012, license fees were reduced to $325 as a result of a member referendum, thus placing the WSBA annual fee near the median for all state bar associations, according to the ABA Survey. Based on WSBA bylaws, any member may propose a member referendum to overturn a Board decision through submitting a specified number of signatures in support of the effort. After submitting the required number of signatures, a member referendum was put before the membership to reduce license fees to $325. It passed by a vote of 52% of those who voted, cutting the WSBA budget by 26%. A wave of staff layoffs ensued, as well as budget reductions and changes to programs and services.

Washington State provides WSBA employees with paid public retirement.

== Services to lawyers ==
WSBA implements the rules for admitting persons to the practice of law by means of biannual Bar Exams and annual relicensing. Its Office of Disciplinary Counsel investigates and prosecutes claims of lawyer misconduct, as specified in the Washington State Court Rules of Professional Conduct.

WSBA's Lawyer Services Department provides a variety of services:

- The Job Seeking Assistance program offers job listings, career counselling, support groups, and information about job search skills.
- The Ethics/Professional Responsibility Program provides education on ethical matters. A telephone Ethics Line allows anonymous inquires by lawyers needing advice. WSBA Ethics Opinions are maintained online.
- The Law Office Management Assistance Program provides education and advice on running a law office, including a lending library and on-site education.
- The Lawyer Assistance Program (LAP) offers confidential mental health and chemical dependency counselling services for Washington state judges, lawyers, and third-year law students. Services include peer advisors, confidential individual consultations, support groups and statewide 24/7 phone access to WSBA Connects, which offers support to lawyers needing health and well-being support. The LAP was established to prevent or alleviate problems before they jeopardize an individual's ability to practice law. Services are confidential, as provided under Washington State Rules APR 19(b)

WSBA's Advancement Department provides a broad array of educational opportunities for lawyers, primarily through its Continuing Legal Education seminars. New Lawyer Education is a library of free and low-cost accredited programs tailored to new lawyers. The Preadmission Education Program is a mandatory four-hour training course for new attorneys that must be taken prior to admission to the WSBA.

=== Sections ===
WSBA hosts Sections, which are voluntary associations of attorneys interested in a common topic, such as Animal Law, Corporate Law, Criminal Law, Family Law and Human Rights Law. These organizations provide educational and networking opportunities.

New lawyers (admitted to practice for less than five years or under age 36) are the special province of the Washington Young Lawyers Committee (WYLC). The WYLC has three focus areas: Member Outreach & Leadership, Transition to Practice, and Pro Bono and Public Service.

== Services to other legal professionals ==
In an attempt to address a continuing shortage of inexpensive legal service, WSBA became the first state bar in the United States to issue alternative licenses to practice law for practitioners who are not lawyers.

=== Limited Practice Officers ===
WSBA administers, under APR 12, the Limited Practice Officer (LPO) license for non-lawyers to select, prepare, and complete approved documents for use in closing a loan, extension of credit, sale, or other transfer of real or personal property. As of March 20, 2018, there were 796 active LPOs licensed to practice in Washington state.

=== Limited License Legal Technicians ===
The Washington Supreme Court on June 15, 2012, issued an order adopting the Limited License Legal Technician (LLLT) Rule, directing WSBA to create a license that allows trained professionals to practice law on a limited basis as a means to further access to justice for those who cannot afford a lawyer. In March 2013 the Court approved family law as the first practice area authorized for limited license legal technicians under the Court's Admission and Practice Rule (APR) 28. The first group of legal technicians were licensed in 2015. After several years of licensure, the Washington Supreme Court in June 2020 decided to sunset the Limited License Legal Technician program, with July 31, 2022, being the deadline for anyone in the educational pipeline to complete all requirements.

== Services to the public ==
WSBA promotes justice through a variety of projects:

- Access to Justice programs improves and expands access to the justice system for low- and moderate-income people.
- The Moderate Means Program was established in 2012 to connect clients whose income is within 200–400% of the Federal Poverty Level to lawyers who offer legal assistance at a reduced fee.
- The Washington First Responder Will Clinic aims to provide basic estate-planning documents — wills, powers of attorney, and healthcare directives — for Washington first responders and their spouses/state-registered domestic partners at no cost.
- The ATJ Board Technology Committee promulgates the principle that technology must be implemented in a way that improves the quality of justice for all persons in Washington state, increases opportunities, and eliminates barriers to access and effective utilization of the justice system.
- Law Week organizes lawyers and judges to visit classrooms in their communities during the first week of May.
- The Lawyers' Fund for Client Protection was established for the purpose of relieving or mitigating a monetary loss sustained by any client due to the dishonesty of, or failure to account for money or property entrusted to, any member of the WSBA in connection with the member's practice of law or while acting as a fiduciary in a matter related to the member's practice of law. The Fund is funded by an annual assessment of members of the WSBA by order of the Washington Supreme Court and produces an annual report on its activities.
- The WSBA Speakers Bureau is made up of attorneys around the state who are eager to address students, legal professionals, civic organizations, service groups, and other audiences on legal topics, generally at no charge.
- WSBA maintains an online lawyer directory, including contact information and information about whether a lawyer has been disciplined.

== Washington State Bar Foundation ==
The Washington State Bar Foundation is a 501(c)(3) public charity dedicated to fundraising on behalf of the WSBA. The Bar Foundation ensures WSBA with sufficient resources to lead on issues of justice, public service, and diversity. It helps to support programs such as the Moderate Means Program.

== Print/online communications ==
WSBA communicates and provides information in a number of ways:

- Washington State Bar News is WSBA's print periodical, published nine times a year. It publishes official notices (including disciplinary notices), educational articles, news of interest to the legal profession, and more.
- NWSidebar is WSBA's blog, intended for WSBA members and the greater legal community. It publishes posts from WSBA staff, WSBA members, and other legal professionals
