= Rainier Tower =

41-story skyscraper in Seattle, Washington

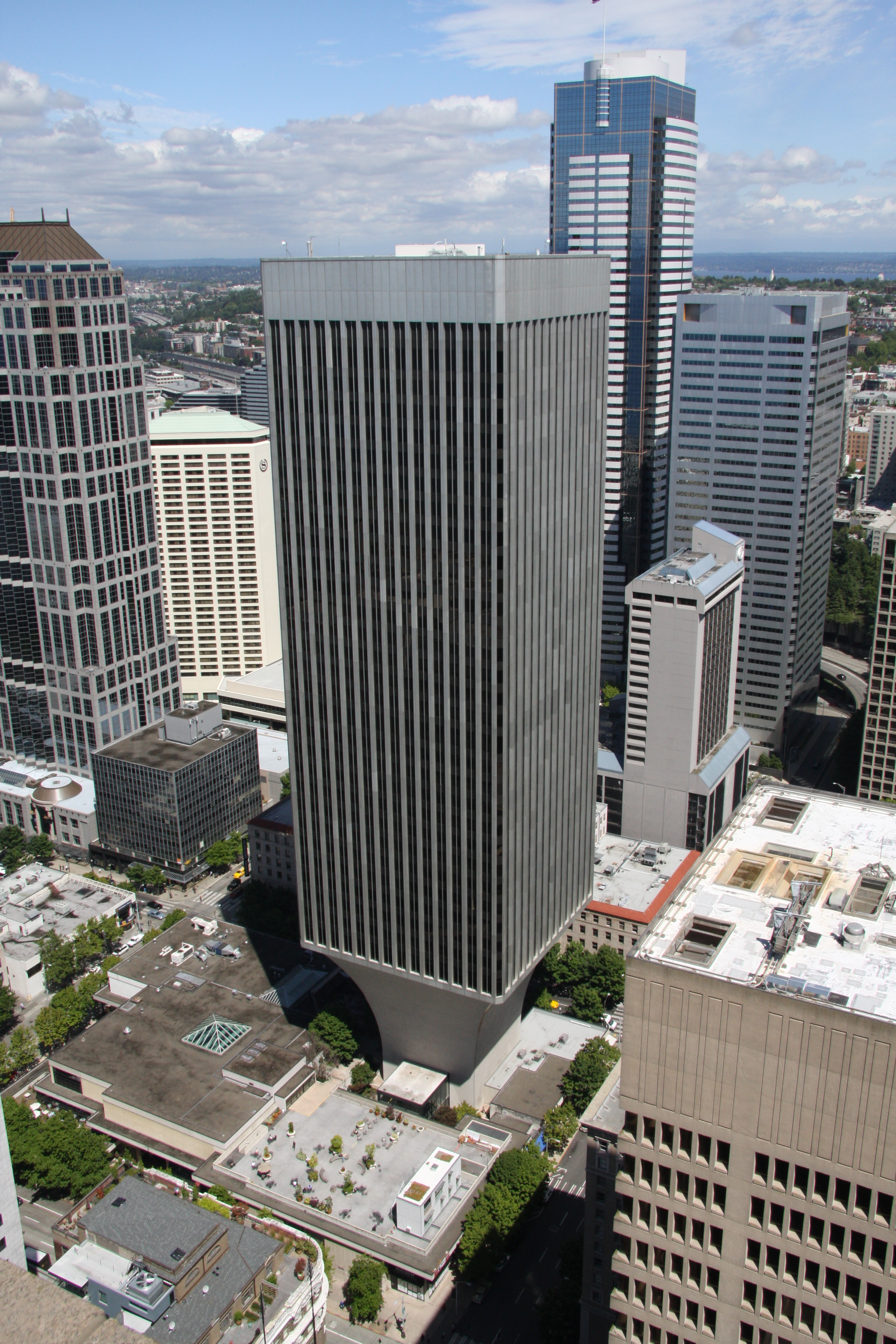

- Location within Downtown Seattle
- Former names: Rainier Bank Tower (1977–89); Security Pacific Tower (1989–95)
- Alternative names: Rainier Square

General information
- Type: Commercial offices
- Location: 1301 Fifth Avenue; Seattle, Washington
- Coordinates: 47.60902°N 122.33405°W
- Completed: 1977
- Owner: Unico Properties

Height
- Roof: 156.67 m (514.0 ft)

Technical details
- Floor count: 41; 2 below ground
- Floor area: 538,000 sq ft (50,000 m^{2})
- Lifts/elevators: 13

Design and construction
- Architects: Minoru Yamasaki; NBBJ
- Structural engineer: Magnusson Klemencic Associates

Rainier Tower is a 41-story, 156.67 m (514.0 ft) skyscraper in the Metropolitan Tract of Seattle, Washington, at 1301 Fifth Avenue. It was designed by Minoru Yamasaki, who designed the World Trade Center in New York City as well as the IBM Building, which is on the corner across the street from Rainier Tower to the southeast. Its construction was completed in 1977.

The skyscraper has an unusual appearance, being built atop an 11-story, 37 m (121 ft) concrete pedestal base that tapers towards ground level, like an inverted pyramid. Architect Yamasaki chose the design in order to preserve the greenery of downtown Seattle and allow more ground space to be devoted to a retail shopping plaza. This pedestal houses much of the building's mechanical systems.The tower above the pedestal is complete with aluminum mullions and recessed, dark-colored spandrels, elements typical of the architect's style. The structure is a framed tube system, like his famous World Trade Center buildings, which allows for open floor plans.

Beneath the tower was Rainier Square, an underground shopping mall connecting with One Union Square, which is owned by the University of Washington (UW). This shopping center was demolished in 2017. Both the mall and tower were originally named after Rainier Bank, which was merged in the 1980s into Security Pacific, which was eventually merged into Bank of America. The tower was named after Security Pacific in 1989 until UW chose to rename it back to the more familiar "Rainier Tower" in 1995.

Locals often refer to it as the "Beaver Building" as its physical appearance looks like a tree being felled by a beaver. It had also been referred to as the "golf tee" building.

In 2015, the University of Washington proposed the Rainier Square Tower, an 850 ft mixed-use tower, to occupy space on the same block as the Rainier Tower. Construction began in September 2017, and completed in 2020.

== History ==
Yamasaki was commissioned by Unico, for whom he had worked on the adjacent IBM Building in the early 60s. The building was initially planned to be called the "Commerce House" building. Public announcement of the project sparked protests from students, architects, and other regional professionals who wanted to save the existing structures on the site - which were some of the only remaining historic buildings still standing on the rapidly developing Metropolitan Tract. This included the now demolished White-Henry-Stuart building.

== See also ==
- List of tallest buildings in Seattle
