= Ben Tobin =

American real estate developer

- Born: 1903
- Died: 1996 (aged 92–93); Hollywood, Florida
- Occupation: Real Estate Developer
- Known for: Founder of The Ben Tobin Companies, Ltd.
- Children: Herbert Tobin; Steven Tobin; Benita Tobin Anderson

Ben Tobin (November 8, 1903 – June 7, 1996) was an American real estate developer, philanthropist, and investor in Broadway shows.

== Early life ==
Tobin was born to a Jewish family in Russia and immigrated to the United States while he was still a child. He had two brothers, Morris Tobb and Jack Tobb and one sister, Bessie Ganek. His family moved to Detroit, Michigan, in the 1920s.

== Career ==
During the Great Depression, Tobin purchased buildings in Detroit and then expanded to Cleveland, Ohio, where he purchased the Hollenden Hotel.

In 1945, Tobin moved to Florida and purchased the 900-room Hollywood Beach Hotel in Hollywood, Florida, which had been used by the United States Navy as a barracks and developed it into a five-star international resort until it closed in 1971.

In 1951, he formed a partnership with Alfred R. Glancy and Roger L. Stevens and purchased the Empire State Building for $51 million, then the highest price paid for a single building in history; he more than doubled his investment when he sold his interest in the building three years later to a Chicago partnership.

In 1953, together with Roger L. Stevens, Alfred R. Glancy III, and H. Adams Ashforth, he founded Unico Properties to develop a 10-acre University of Washington site in central Seattle.

Tobin then ventured on his own and founded Ben Tobin Companies Ltd., which developed the Hillcrest Country Club in Hollywood, Florida as well as one million square feet of shopping centers in five states. He also financed numerous Broadway plays including West Side Story.

In 1962, his son, Herbert A. Tobin, joined the company. In 1991, Herbert's son, Jason L. Tobin, joined the company. Jason is now the President of Tobin Properties. As of 2017, Tobin Properties owns over one and a half million square feet of property throughout the Southeastern United States.

== Philanthropy ==
Tobin was a major benefactor to Jewish philanthropies: he was a founder of Mount Sinai Hospital in Miami Beach, Florida, the State of Israel Bond Organizations (who awarded him the Freedom Medal of Israel by the State of Israel Bonds Organization); and was a fellow of Brandeis University in Waltham, Massachusetts (where a dormitory bears his name). He was also the founder of the Jewish Federation of South Broward and Temple Beth El in Hollywood, where he was a member. He founded the Ben Tobin Foundation which was a major benefactor to Channel 2 WPBT, Miami-Dade County's public television station, and to the Lowe Art Museum at the University of Miami in Coral Gables, Florida.

== Personal life ==
He was married to Jeanette Tobin having two children Herbert Tobin, Steven Tobin and then to Iris Maxwell, Miss Miami Beach 1953 and WCKT Miami Romper Room TV Show Host, having a daughter Benita Tobin Anderson. He died on June 7, 1996, at his home in Hollywood, Florida.
