= Roger L. Stevens =

American theatre manager (1910–1998)

Roger Stevens
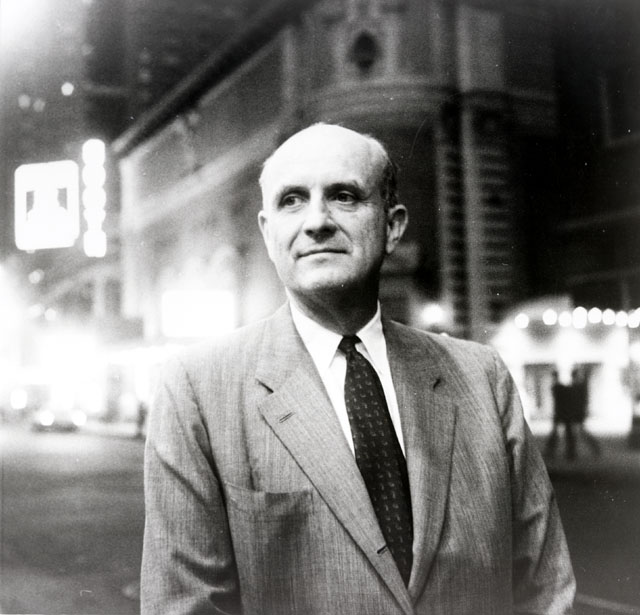
- Born: Roger Lacey Stevens; March 12, 1910; Detroit, Michigan, U.S.
- Died: February 2, 1998 (aged 87); Washington, D.C., U.S.
- Education: University of Michigan (attended)
- Spouse: Christine Gesell
- Children: 1

Roger Lacey Stevens (March 12, 1910 – February 2, 1998) was an American theatrical producer, arts administrator, and real estate executive. He was the founding Chairman of both the Kennedy Center for the Performing Arts (1961) and the National Endowment for the Arts (1965).

== Biography ==
Born in Detroit, Michigan, Stevens was educated at The Choate School (now Choate Rosemary Hall) in Wallingford, Connecticut. He was about to enter Harvard University but his father's financial difficulties ended his plan. He attended the University of Michigan for a year before dropping out. He then worked on a Ford assembly line and at a gas station during the Depression.

In 1934, he joined a Detroit real estate firm. By 1937, before he was 30, his real estate work had made him a small fortune of about $50,000. He led a syndicate (along with Ben Tobin and Alfred R. Glancy Jr.) that bought the Empire State Building in 1951 for $51 million, then a titanic sum; he more than doubled his investment when he sold his interest in the building three years later.

In 1953, together with Alfred R. Glancy Jr., Ben Tobin, and H. Adams Ashforth, he founded Unico Properties to develop a 10-acre University of Washington site in central Seattle.

In politics, he made a mark as chairman of the Democratic Party's finance committee in 1956.

He produced more than 100 plays and musicals over his career, including West Side Story, Bus Stop, and Cat on a Hot Tin Roof. In 1971, he received Special Tony Award for his body of work. He became known for introducing plays by such adventurous writers as Harold Pinter, Arthur Kopit and Tom Stoppard.

Stevens was the General Administrator of the Actors Studio as well as one of the producers of the Playwrights Company, a member of the board of the American National Theatre and Academy (ANTA), and one of the members of a Broadway producing company he founded in 1953 with Robert Whitehead, and Robert Dowling. In 1961, he was asked by President John F. Kennedy to help establish a National Cultural Center, and became Chairman of Board of Trustees of what was eventually named the Kennedy Center from 1961 to 1988.

In 1965, he received an appointment from President Lyndon Johnson as first Chairman of the National Council on the Arts later named the National Endowment for the Arts.

In 1986, Stevens was inducted into the American Theater Hall of Fame.

On January 13, 1988, Stevens was presented with the Presidential Medal of Freedom by President Ronald Reagan. In 1988, he was also awarded the National Medal of Arts.

== Personal life ==
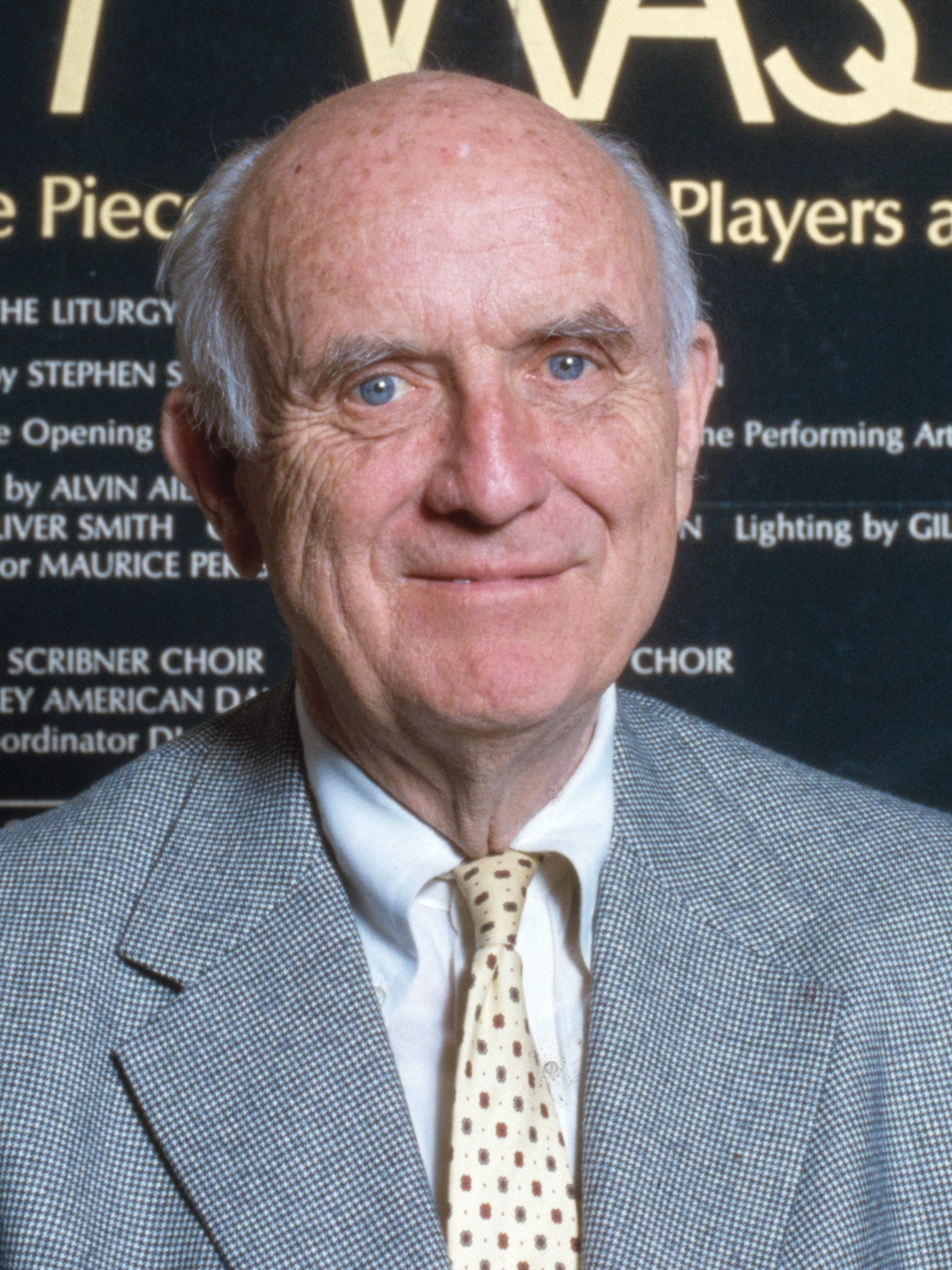
Stevens in 1986

Stevens was married to Christine Gesell Stevens, founder of the Animal Welfare Institute in 1951. He served as the organization's treasurer until his death in 1998. They had a daughter, Christabel.

He had his first heart attack in 1970. In 1993, he suffered strokes that left him partly paralyzed and deprived him of much of his speech.

Roger Stevens died of pneumonia on February 2, 1998, at Georgetown University Medical Center in Washington, D.C. He was 87.

== Stage productions ==
- Broken Glass (1994) Tony Award nominee, Best Play
- The Kentucky Cycle (1993) Tony Award nominee, Best Play
- She Loves Me (1993) Tony Award nominee, Best Revival of a Musical
- Shadowlands (1990) Tony Award nominee, Best Play
- Death of a Salesman (1984) Tony Award winner, Best Reproduction
- On Your Toes (1983) Tony Award winner, Best Reproduction (Play or Musical)
- Bedroom Farce (1979) Tony Award nominee, Best Play
- Deathtrap (1978) Tony Award nominee, Best Play
- Old Times (1971) Tony Award nominee, Best Play
- Indians (1969) Tony Award nominee, Best Play
- Half a Sixpence (1965) Tony Award nominee, Best Musical
- Slow Dance On the Killing Ground (1964) Tony Award nominee, Best Producer of a Play
- Strange Interlude (1963) Tony Award nominee, Best Producer of a Play
- A Man for All Seasons (1962) Tony Award winner, Best Play and Best Producer of a Play
- The Caretaker (1961) Tony Award nominee, Best Play
- The Visit (1958) Tony Award nominee, Best Play
- A Touch of the Poet (1958) Tony Award nominee, Best Play
- West Side Story (1957) (by arrangement) Tony Award nominee, Best Musical
- Time Remembered (1957) Tony Award nominee, Best Play
- The Rope Dancers (1957) Tony Award nominee, Best Play
- Separate Tables (1956) Tony Award nominee, Best Play
- The Waltz of the Toreadors (1956) Tony Award nominee, Best Play
- Bus Stop (1955) Tony Award nominee, Best Play
- Cat on a Hot Tin Roof (1955) Tony Award nominee, Best Play
