= Doha Tower and Convention Center =

Coordinates: 25.3277°N 51.5321°E

- الدوحة برج مركز المؤتمرات
- Interactive map of the Doha Tower and Convention Center area

General information
- Status: Complete (Convention Centre); On hold (Tower)
- Type: Mixed-use
- Location: Doha, Qatar
- Construction started: October 22, 2007
- Estimated completion: TBA
- Opening: dec 2019 (Convention Centre); TBA (Tower)
- Owner: Qatari Diar Real Estate Investment Company

Height
- Antenna spire: 560 m (1,840 ft)
- Roof: 551 m (1,808 ft)

Technical details
- Floor count: 112

Design and construction
- Architects: Murphy/Jahn; MEP_engineer: Arup; Consultant: Hyder Consulting; Project Management: Turner Architect of Record: Diwan Al Emara
- Structural engineer: Magnusson Klemencic Associates, Hyder Consulting
- Main contractor: Besix, Midmac Contracting Company, Eversendai, ETA-Debbas (MEP)

The Doha Convention Center Tower is a on-hold 560 m (1,840 ft) tall skyscraper project which was planned to be constructed in Doha, Qatar. The structure, shaped like a tapering obelisk, would have housed offices on the lower levels, apartments, a hotel and penthouse residences on the upper floors. At the very top, a private club was to occupy a 60 m (200 ft) high glass cylinder surrounded by extensions of tower's façade and supported by a structural helix.

Construction was suspended following the discovery that the building would impact flight paths to and from Doha International Airport. Construction was expected to continue when the Hamad International Airport was completed on reclaimed land approximately 3 km to the east of the current airport. The delay meant that the building's completion date was moved from 2012 to an unknown date. The Tower was redesigned with a similar shape similar to the nearby Al Quds Endowment Tower. After the completion of Hamad International Airport, the plans for the supertall skyscraper were scrapped; however, the convention center was successfully built, and opened in 2015.

== See also ==
- List of tallest buildings in Doha, Qatar
- List of buildings with 100 floors or more
