= One Nashville Place =

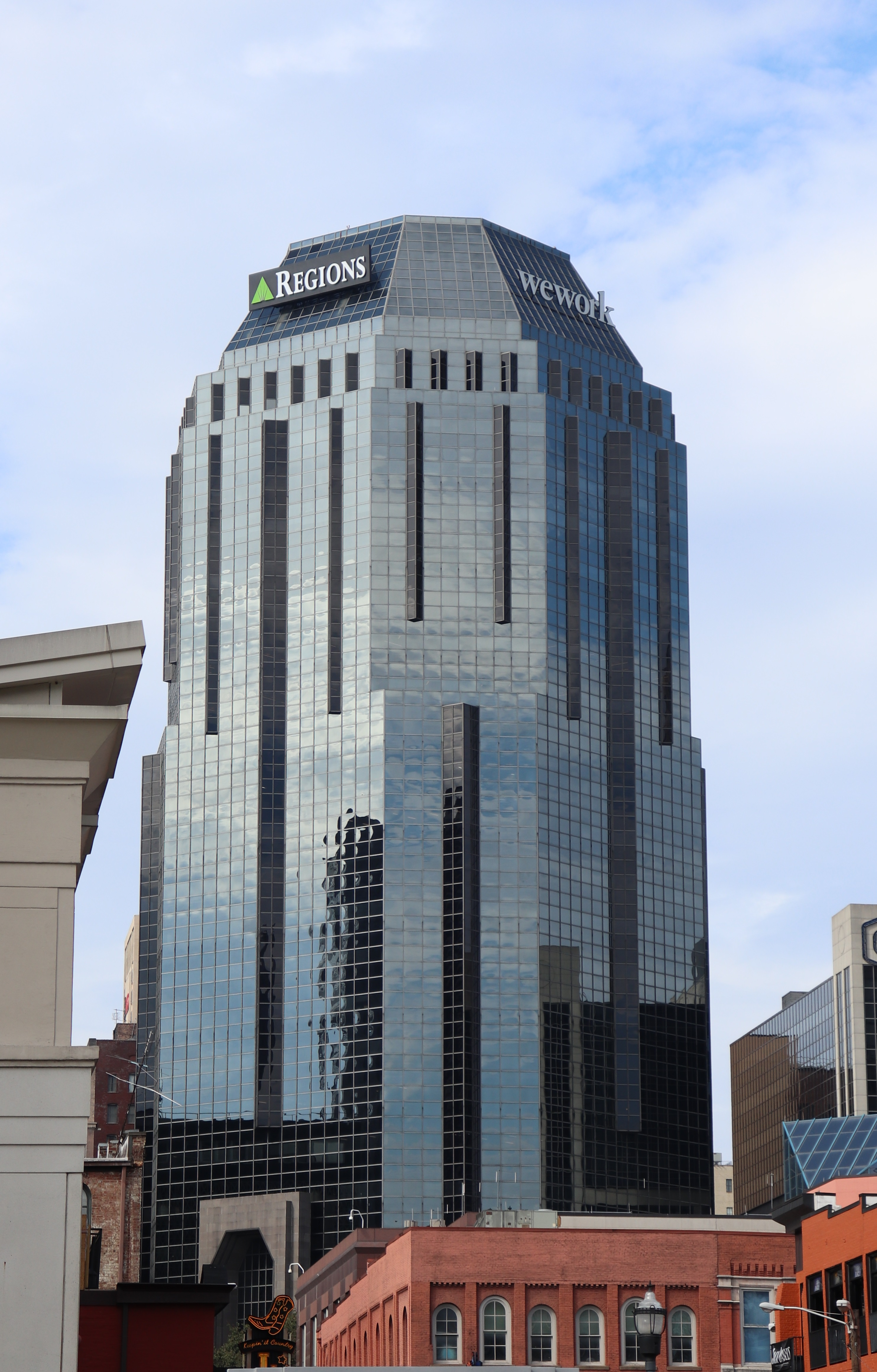
- One Nashville Place

General information
- Location: 150 Fourth Avenue North; Nashville, Tennessee; United States
- Coordinates: 36.1629°N 86.7780°W
- Construction started: 1983
- Completed: 1985
- Owner: Unico Properties

Height
- Roof: 359 ft (109 m)

Technical details
- Floor count: 25
- Floor area: 410,579 sq ft (38,144.0 m^{2})

Design and construction
- Architect: Morris Architects (formerly Morris-Aubry)

One Nashville Place is a skyscraper in Nashville, Tennessee located on Fourth Avenue and Commerce Street. Completed in 1985, this 359 foot octagonal building with dark glass exterior has 25 floors and has been given the nickname R2-D2 by the people of Nashville after the character in the Star Wars movies. It is currently the twenty-fifth tallest building in Nashville.

== History ==
The skyscraper was built in 1983–1985. It has been given the nickname R2-D2 by the people of Nashville after the character in the Star Wars movies.

The top of the building currently features the signage of Regions Financial Corporation. The new logo was put into place on May 12, 2013. Several other now-retired banks have seen their logos at the top, including Dominion Bank (acquired by First Union), First Union (which sold its presence in Nashville to Firstar), and Firstar (which acquired, and later became, US Bank). Regions has made a move to One Nashville Place and now has their logo on top of One Nashville Place.

Boston investors, TA Associates Realty, bought the building in late 2014 for $98.8 million and put the Boyle Investment Company in charge of leasing and managing the office tower.

In September 2018, it was purchased by Unico Properties, a Seattle-based property investment company, for $139.5 million.

== Major Tenants ==
- Regions Financial Corporation
- Professional Credential Services
- Lassiter, Tidwell, Davis, Keller & Hogan, PLLC
- NASBA
- Merrill Lynch
- Neal & Harwell
- CB Richard Ellis
- Denham Property and Injury Law Firm
- Ernst & Young
- Morgan and Morgan
- Manier & Herod
- Agency for the Performing Arts
- WeWork

== See also ==
- List of tallest buildings in Nashville
