= Cobb Building (Seattle) =

Building in Seattle's Metropolitan Tract

- U.S. National Register of Historic Places
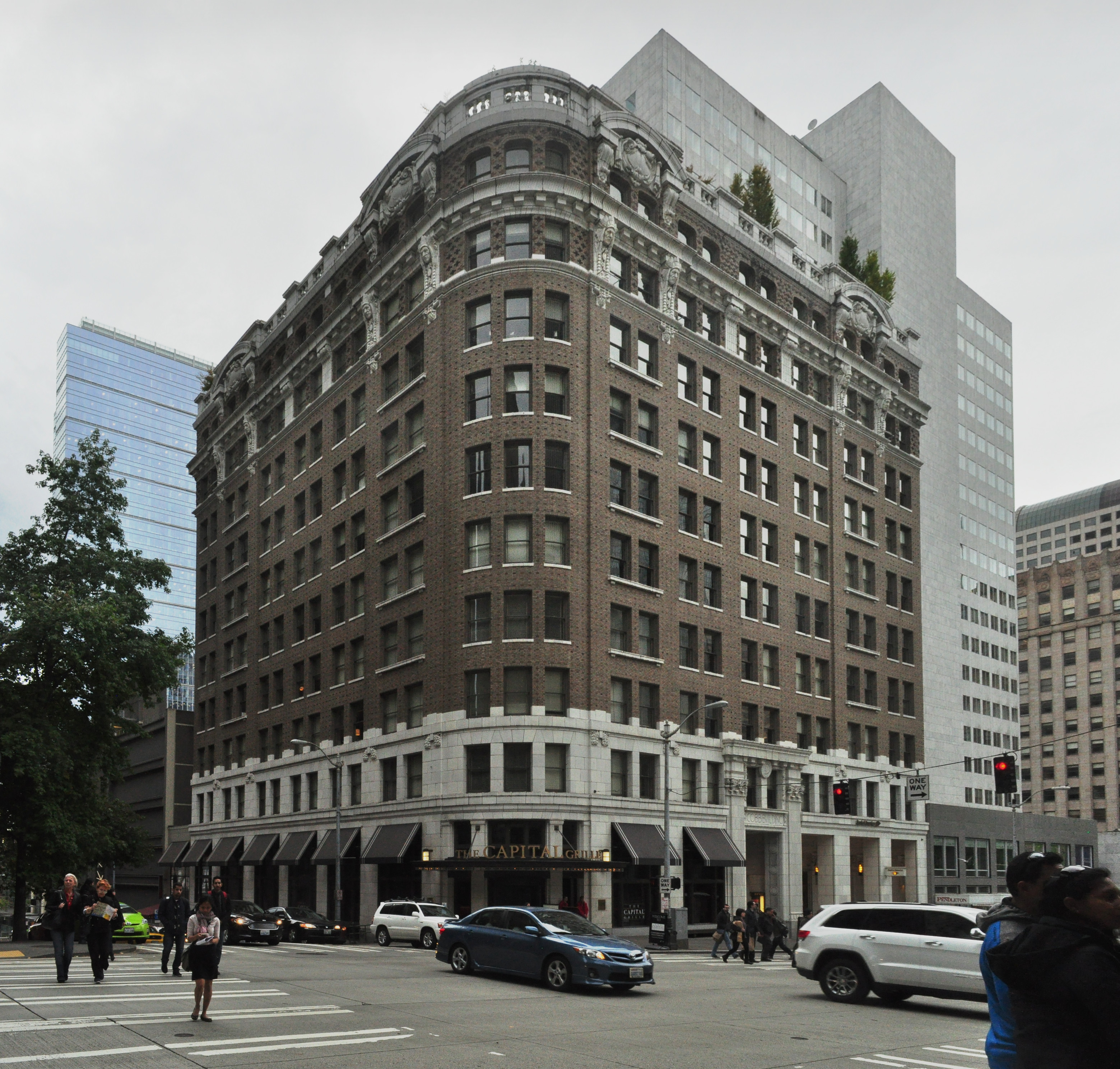
- The Cobb Building in 2015

- Location within Downtown Seattle
- Location: Seattle, Washington
- Coordinates: 47°36′30″N 122°20′07″W
- Built: 1910
- Architect: Howells & Stokes
- Architectural style: Beaux-Arts
- NRHP reference No.: 84003485
- Added to NRHP: August 3, 1984

The Cobb Building is an eleven-story building in Seattle, Washington. It was the third structure in Seattle's Metropolitan Tract and the only surviving of several buildings in the 10-acre tract of its design that once lined both sides of 4th Avenue. Located at 1301 4th Avenue at the corner of 4th Avenue and University Street. The Howells & Stokes architectural firm designed the building and sent Abraham H. Albertson to supervise its 1909-1910 construction. Sculpted Native American ornaments at the 9th and 10th floor cornice are attributed to Victor G. Schneider. An early example of a high-rise medical office center, the Cobb Building later became commercial office space and recently was renovated for apartments.
