= Magnusson Klemencic Associates =

American structural and civil engineering consulting firm

- Company type: Private
- Industry: Structural and civil engineering
- Founded: 1920; 106 years ago
- Headquarters: Seattle, Washington
- Key people: John Skilling; Jon Magnusson; Ron Klemencic
- Number of employees: 200
- Website: www.mka.com

Magnusson Klemencic Associates is an American structural and civil engineering consulting firm with its headquarters in Seattle, Washington. The company has completed projects worth more than $99 billion in 48 states and 54 countries. Significant MKA projects through its history include the World Trade Center, the Columbia Center, Aqua, the Doha Convention Center Tower, the Olympic Sculpture Park, Salesforce Tower, and JW Marriott Indianapolis.

== History ==
Magnusson Klemencic Associates was founded in 1920 as the W.H. Witt Company in Seattle. In 1929, Witt died in a railroad crossing accident and the company passed to partners Harold Worthington and George Runciman (who was referred to as "a leading structural engineer in Seattle"). During this time the firm designed several notable Seattle buildings, including the Joseph Vance Building and the 1223 Spring Apartment Building.

After the end of World War II the building industry in the United States picked up and the firm grew in size. In 1955 the firm was renamed Worthington and Skilling, reflecting the addition of John Skilling as a partner. John Skilling, a member of the National Academy of Engineering, remained a partner in the firm for over 45 years. Notable projects under Skilling's leadership include the World Trade Center, IBM Building, and the Columbia Center. During the design of the World Trade Center the firm maintained offices in Seattle as well as New York City.

In 1960 the firm name changed to Worthington, Skilling, Helle & Jackson, reflecting the addition of Helge Helle and Joe Jackson as partners. In 1967, John V. Christiansen and Leslie E. Robertson would become partners and the firm would be named Skilling, Helle, Christiansen, Robertson. However, in the early 1980s partner Robertson split the New York City office from the firm to become Leslie E. Robertson Associates. And in 1983 the firm name changed to in 1983, Skilling Ward Rogers Barkshire and Bill Ward was named a partner.

In 1976 Jon Magnusson joined the firm, having recently graduated from Berkeley. By age 30 Magnusson was a principal, and in 1987 the firm was renamed Skilling Ward Magnusson Barkshire. At age 34 Magnusson was CEO of the company. In 2003 Magnusson was recognized as an honorary member of the American Institute of Architects (AIA).

Ron Klemencic joined the company in 1992, having spent the previous six years at KPFF Consulting Engineers in Seattle. He was eventually promoted to president, and in 2003 the firm changed its name to Magnusson Klemencic Associates, the first time since 1955 that the name did not reflect John Skilling's leadership. To date, the tallest building designed in the firm's history is the 1,808 ft Doha Convention Center Tower, currently under construction.

Below is a summary of the firm's name changes since its inception.

- 1923-1955: W.H. Witt Company
- 1955-1960: Worthington & Skilling
- 1960-1967: Worthington, Skilling, Helle, & Jackson
- 1967-1983: Skilling, Helle, Christiansen, Robertson
- 1983-1987: Skilling Ward Rogers Barkshire
- 1987-2003: Skilling Ward Magnusson Barkshire
- 2003–present: Magnusson Klemencic Associates

=== Notable staff ===
Magnusson Klemencic has employed many notable engineers. John Skilling, Leslie Robertson, and Jack Christiansen, three of its former partners, are members of the National Academy of Engineering, the most prestigious honor that can be given to an engineer. In his Election Citation, John Skilling is described by the NAE as a "pioneering building engineer." Other awards include Engineer of the Year, awarded by the Structural Engineers Association of Washington, which has been given to several MKA engineers, including Bill Ward, John Skilling, John Hooper, Jon Magnusson, and Michael Valley.

Current Chairman and CEO Ron Klemencic received the 2018 ENR Award of Excellence for "daring to innovate, for spearheading the age of cooperative R&D and for his relentless pursuit of a better and more constructible built environment." In 2019, Ron was honored with the ASCE Outstanding Project and Leaders (OPAL) Award. The OPAL Award recognizes one leader in each of five categories—Design, Education, Government, and Management—with Ron earning the award for his innovation, leadership, and lifetime achievement in the design category. Ron was the volunteer chairman of the nonprofit Council on Tall Buildings and Urban Habitat from 2001 to 2006. He serves as a director for the Charles Pankow Foundation and with a grant from them, he led the development of performance-based seismic design for structures.

== Notable projects ==
Since 1996, MKA projects have won the Grand Conceptor Award three times. The Grand Conceptor Award is the highest award given by the American Council of Engineering Companies (ACEC). It is awarded to the best overall engineering project in the country each year. MKA was given the Grand Conceptor Award for the KeyArena (1996), the Seattle United States Courthouse (2006), and the Olympic Sculpture Park (2008).

=== Skyscrapers ===
The following is a partial list of notable skyscrapers designed by MKA. The World Trade Center was designed by partners of the firm, including Leslie Robertson, before he departed to found his own company, Leslie E. Robertson Associates.

- World Trade Center
- Doha Convention Center Tower
- KAFD World Trade Center
- Leatop Plaza
- Aqua
- Russell Investments Center
- Highcliff
- 300 North LaSalle
- Blue Cross Blue Shield Tower
- Louisville Museum Plaza
- The Summit
- 111 South Wacker Drive
- 340 on the Park
- One Rincon Hill
- Salesforce Tower
- Rainier Square Redevelopment
- JW Marriott Indianapolis

=== Stadiums, public spaces, and other projects ===
- Seattle Central Library
- Experience Music Project (EMP) Museum
- Levi's Stadium, home of the San Francisco 49ers
- Avaya Stadium, home of the San Jose Earthquakes
- T-Mobile Park (formerly Safeco Field), home of the Seattle Mariners
- Lumen Field, home of the Seattle Seahawks and Seattle Sounders FC
- Stockton Arena
- Mineta San Jose International Airport
- Olympic Sculpture Park
- Omni San Diego Hotel
- Dee and Charles Wyly Theatre
- Chase Center
- Performing Arts Center at the World Trade Center
- Presidio Tunnel Tops
