= Rainier Square Tower =

High-rise office and residential building in Seattle, Washington, United States

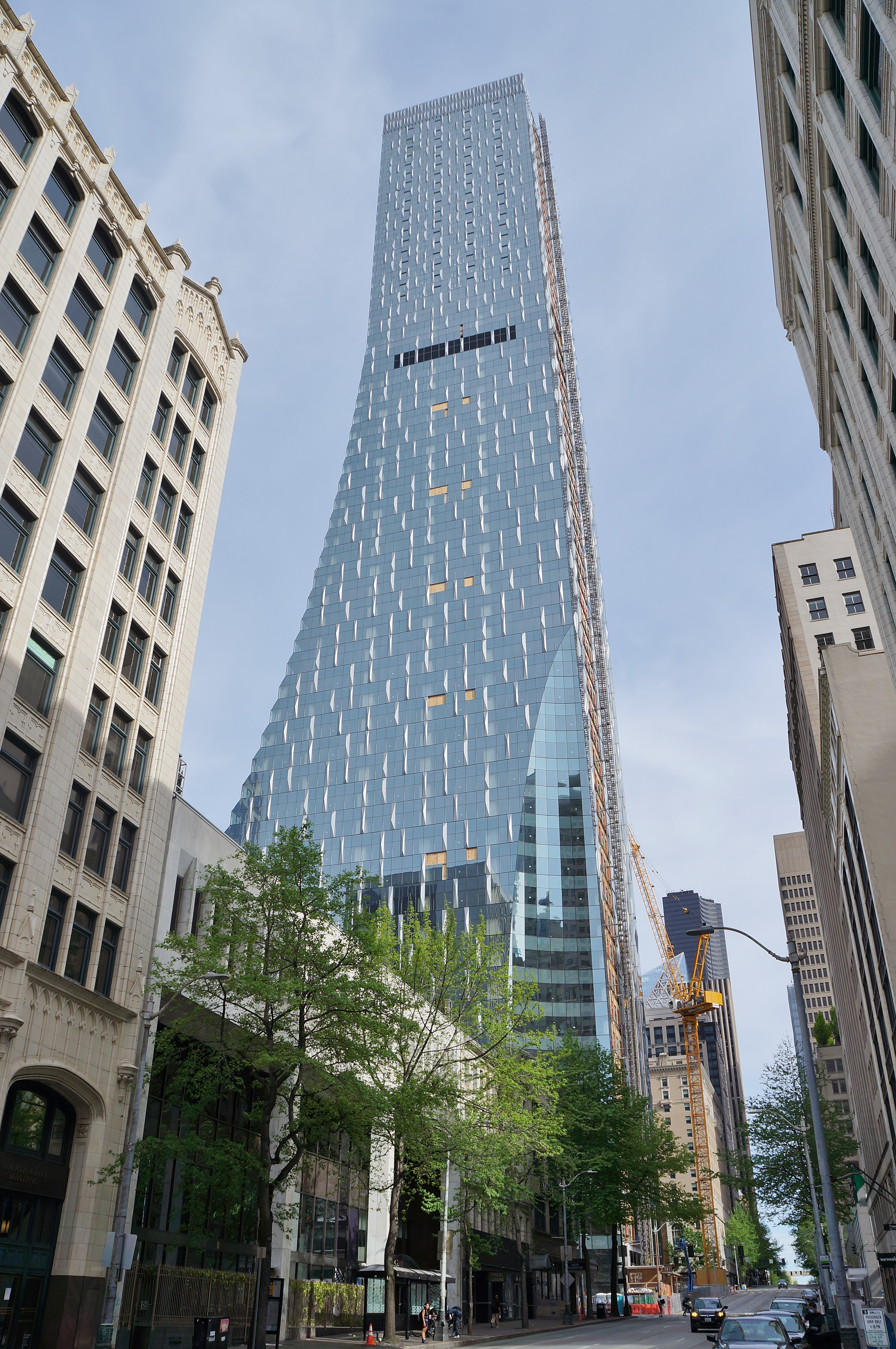
- Under construction in May 2020

- Location within Downtown Seattle Location within Washington (state) Location within the United States

General information
- Status: Completed
- Type: Mixed-use
- Location: 401 Union St; Seattle, Washington, U.S.
- Coordinates: 47°36′33.12″N 122°20′05.89″W
- Construction started: October 2017
- Topped-out: August 2019
- Completed: 2020
- Cost: $600 million (estimated)

Height
- Height: 850 feet (260 m)

Technical details
- Floor count: 58
- Floor area: 1,100,000 sq ft (100,000 m^{2})

Design and construction
- Architecture firm: NBBJ
- Developer: Wright Runstad
- Main contractor: Lease Crutcher Lewis

Website
- rainiersquare.com

Rainier Square Tower is a mixed-use skyscraper in the Metropolitan Tract of downtown Seattle, Washington. The 850-foot (260 m) tall, 58-story tower is located at Union Street between 4th and 5th Avenues adjacent to the existing Rainier Tower; it is the second-tallest building in Seattle. The $600 million project was completed in 2020, and is the tallest building constructed in the city since the construction of the Columbia Center in 1985.

== History ==
The University of Washington, which owns the Metropolitan Tract, announced their intent to redevelop the Rainier Square shopping center in late 2013. The shopping mall opened in 1978 and occupied three-fourths of the block around the existing Rainier Tower. The university's board of regents had previously proposed demolishing the mall for a 26-story hotel in 2000, but the proposal was shelved. In May 2014, the board of regents selected Wright Runstad to develop the property. In November 2015, Wright Runstad raised the tower's proposed height from 800 to 850 feet, with an additional eight stories of luxury apartments. On December 3, 2015, the city approved the master use plan, paving the way for construction to begin.

The Rainier Square shopping center was closed in August 2017 and site demolition began the following month. Amazon.com was announced as the sole lessee of the office portion in October 2017, occupying 722,000 square feet (67,100 m^{2}). In February 2019, Amazon announced that it would sublease the tower while considering other options. Steel core erection began in October 2018 and the building was topped out ten months later in August 2019. It was originally scheduled to be completed in August 2020, and was completed in September 2020.

The retail portion was planned to be occupied by an Equinox Fitness club and a PCC Community Markets store. PCC opened their store in January 2022 and was followed by Fonte Coffee Roaster and Suitsupply; PCC abandoned its store less than two years later. A Mendocino Farms restaurant in the northwest corner opened in September 2023.

Russell Investments announced in July 2024 that they would move their headquarters from the Russell Investments Center to Rainier Square. Remitly also plans to sublease space in the tower.

The 169-room hotel was originally planned to be operated by Equinox under their hotels division, but the building was replaced with an eight-story office building (named "400 University") in October 2019. 400 University was topped out in January 2021.

== Design ==
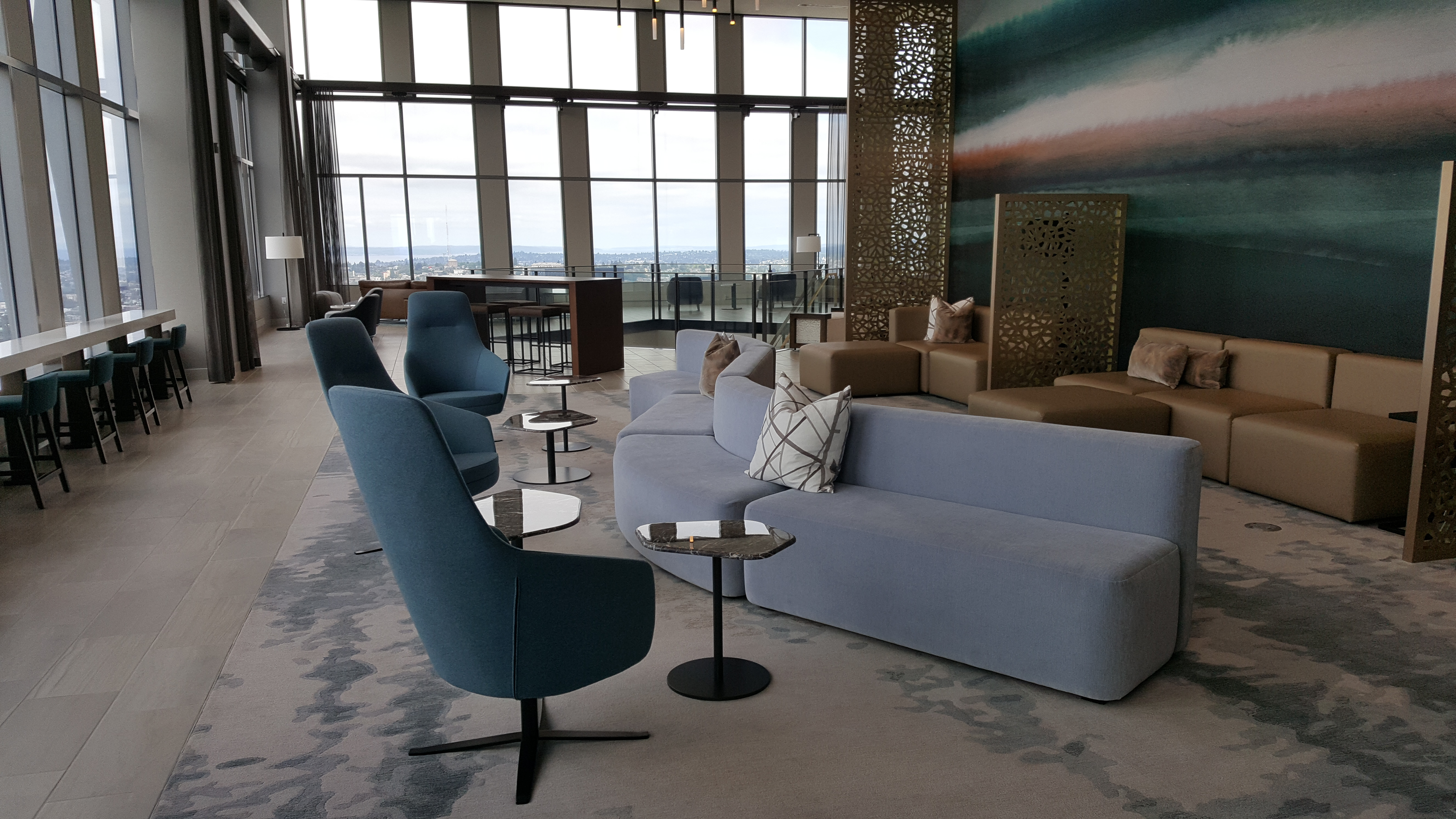
Interior, 2022

The tower, designed by NBBJ, led by Design Partner Mindy Levine-Archer, features nearly 200 luxury apartment units, 750,000 square feet (70,000 m^{2}) of office space, and 30,000 square feet (2,800 m^{2}) of retail space. Six levels of below-grade parking can accommodate up to 1,000 vehicles. The tower has a "sloping" appearance, starting with a wide base and gradually becoming slimmer at higher floors. Early designs had the taper beginning at a higher floor, but it was lowered so as not to obscure views of the unique "pedestal" base of Minoru Yamasaki's adjacent Rainier Tower.

The tower uses a "radical" shear wall core system that used steel plates in lieu of traditional rebar and formwork between concrete elements. This method reduced the amount of time needed to erect the floors of the tower.

A separate, ten-story building on the southwest corner of the site, 400 University, will have 110,000 square feet (10,000 m^{2}) and is set to open in 2021. The building will have a rooftop deck and 9,500 square feet (880 m^{2}) of retail space.

== See also ==
- List of tallest buildings in Seattle
