= Puget Sound Plaza =

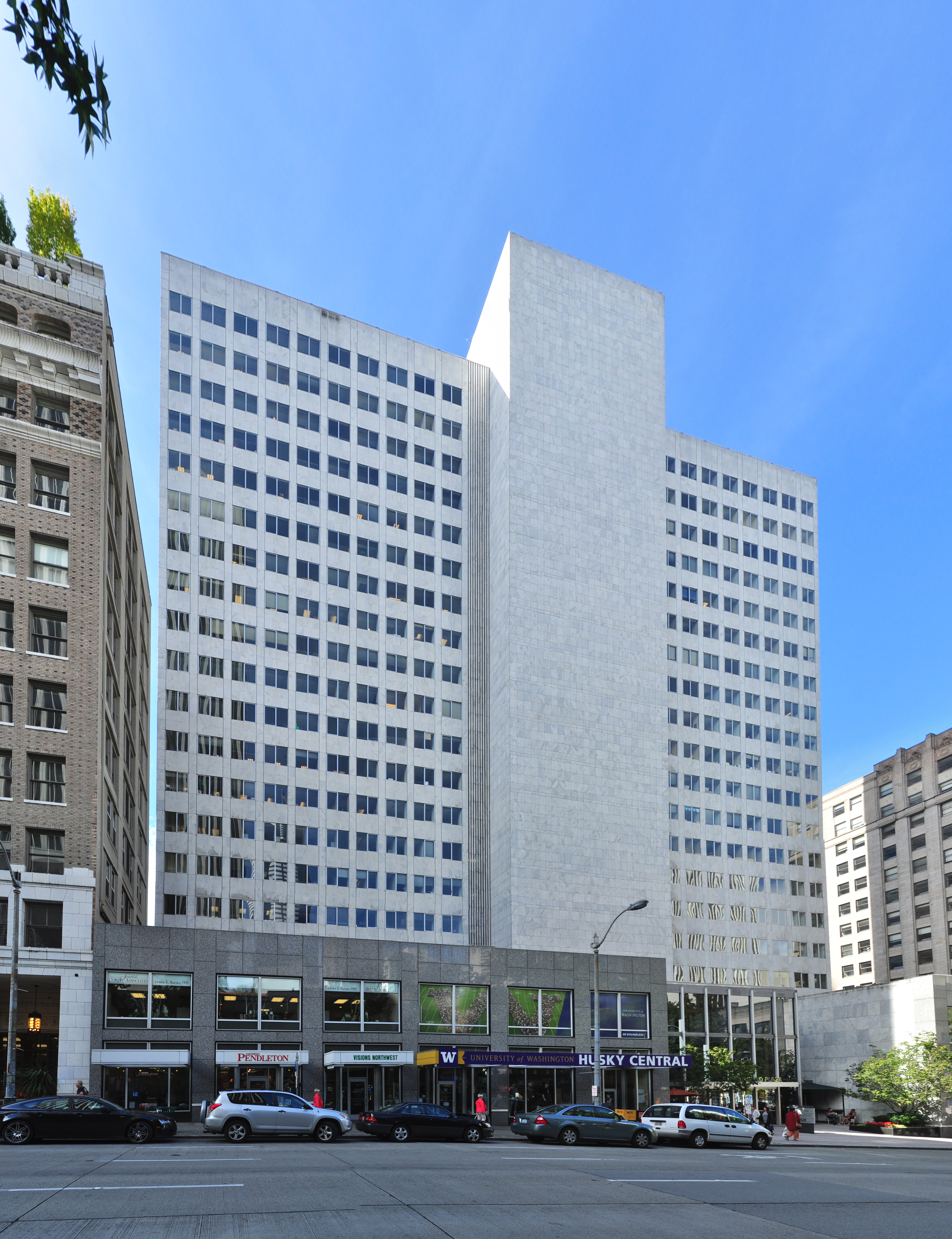
- Puget Sound Plaza in 2015

- Location within Downtown Seattle

General information
- Type: Office / retail
- Location: 1325 Fourth Avenue; Seattle, Washington, U.S.
- Coordinates: 47.60872°N 122.335859°W
- Completed: 1960

Height
- Roof: 88 m (289 ft)

Technical details
- Floor count: 21

Design and construction
- Architect: NBBJ

Puget Sound Plaza is a 21-story skyscraper in the Metropolitan Tract of downtown Seattle, Washington. It is located on 1325 Fourth Avenue and offers 271,000 rentable square feet of space. Its lower two stories were remodeled in 1988. The building also houses a parking garage with 334 parking stalls.
