= Metropolitan Tract =

Area of downtown Seattle

Coordinates: 47.6084°N 122.3344°W

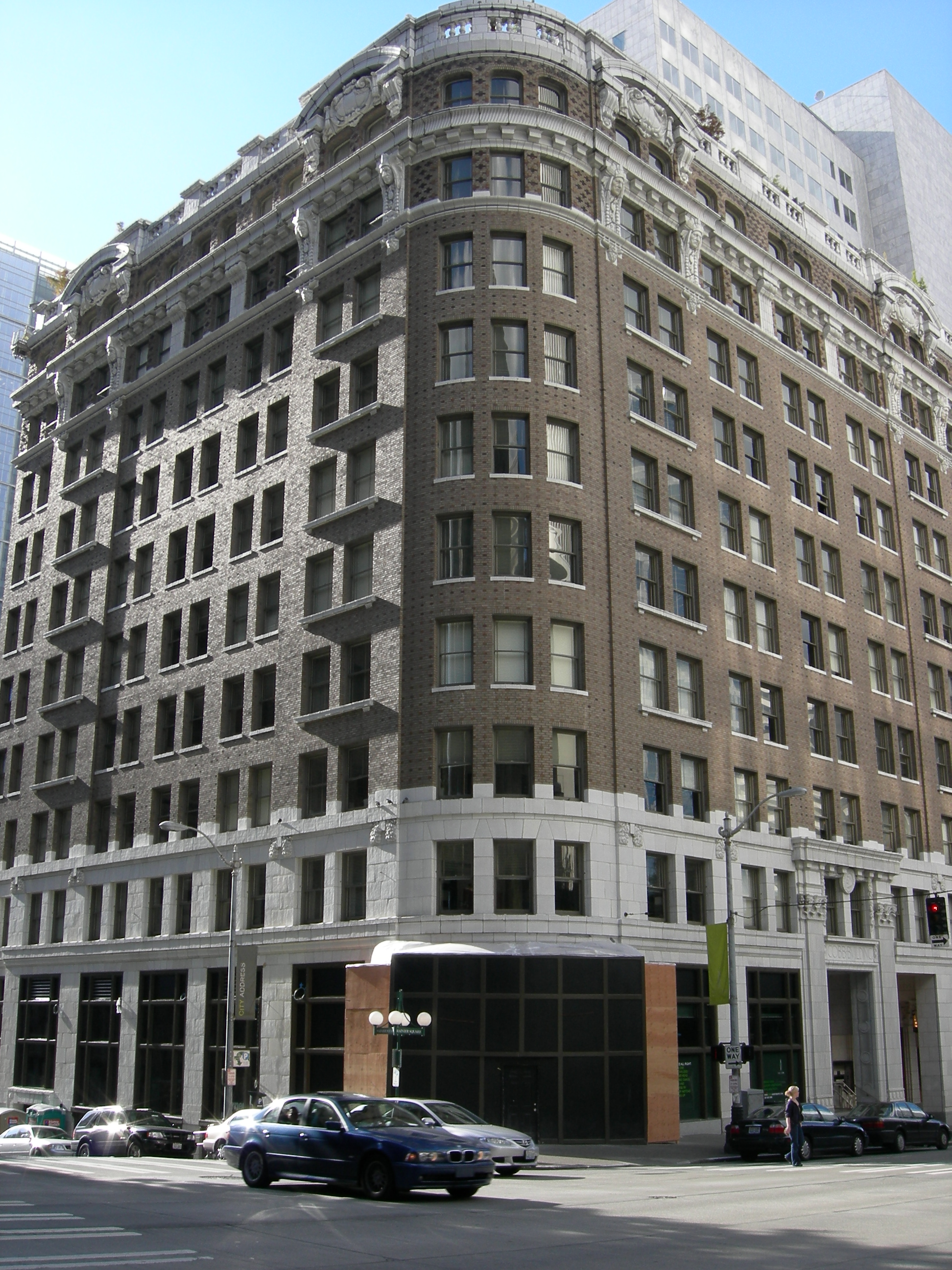
The Cobb Building, 1301–1309 Fourth Avenue, is the only remaining building whose design conforms to the original Howells & Stokes plan for the Metropolitan Tract.

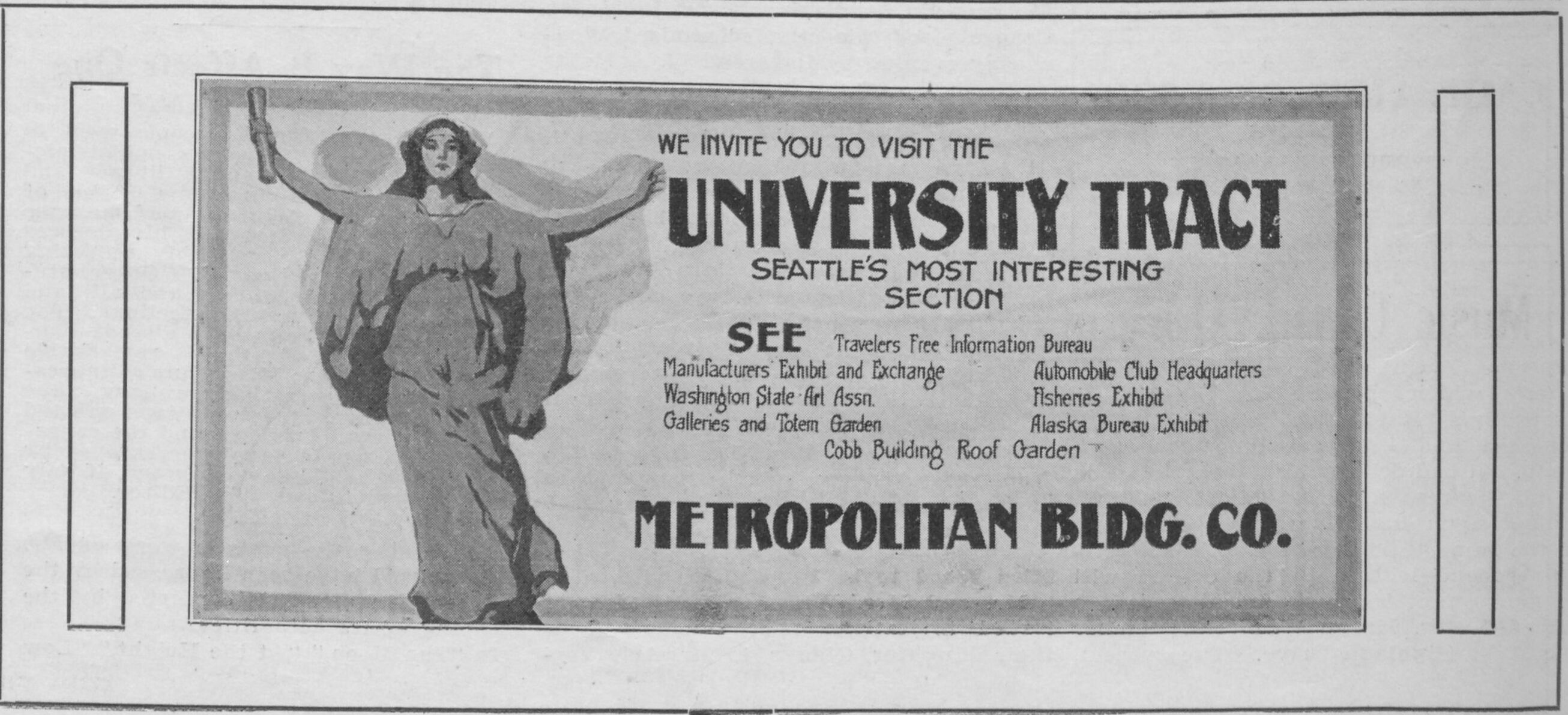
A 1915 advertisement welcoming visitors to what was then known as the "University Tract", but already managed by the Metropolitan Building Company.

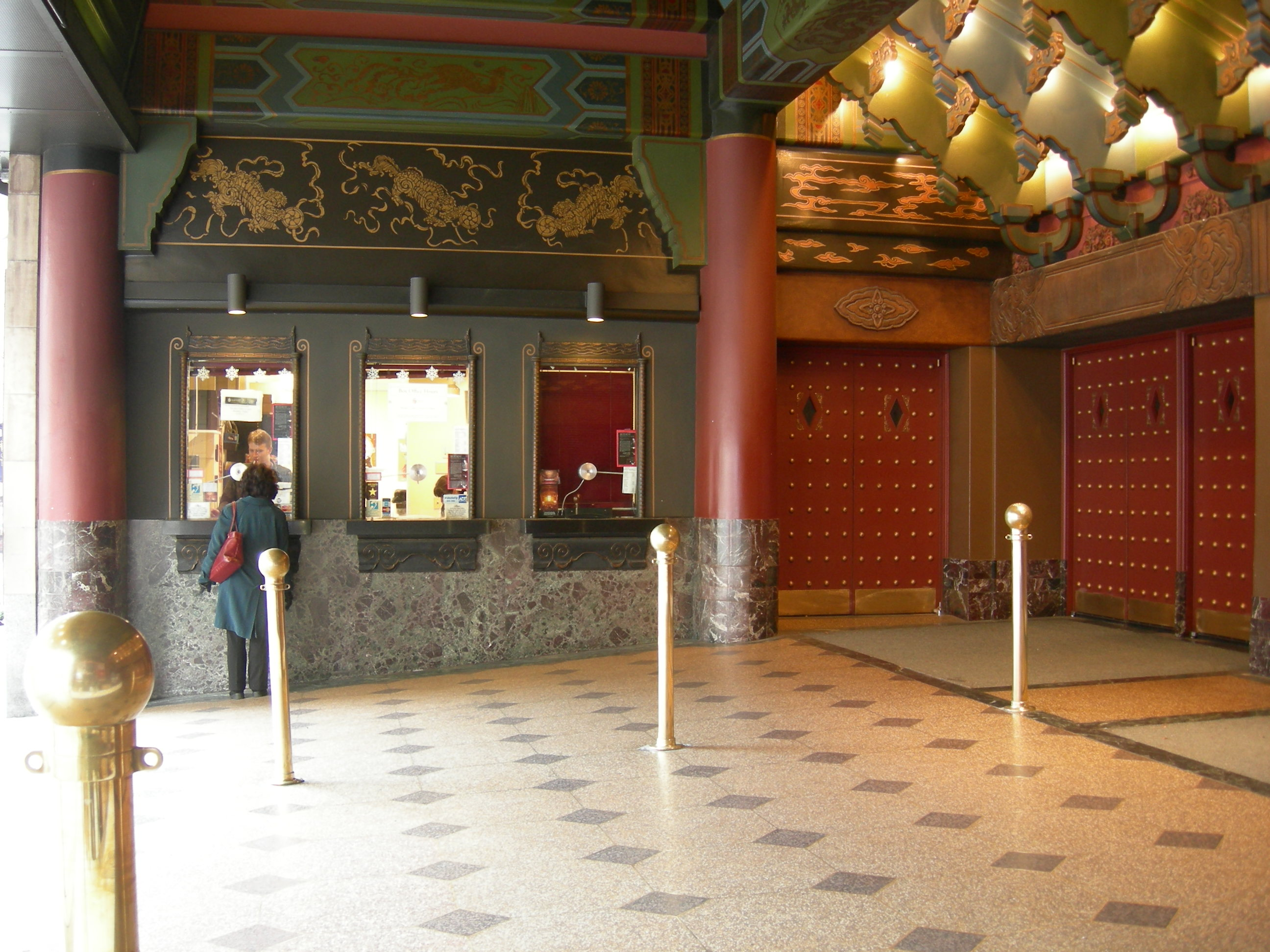
Entryway of Fifth Avenue Theater, in the Metropolitan Tract.

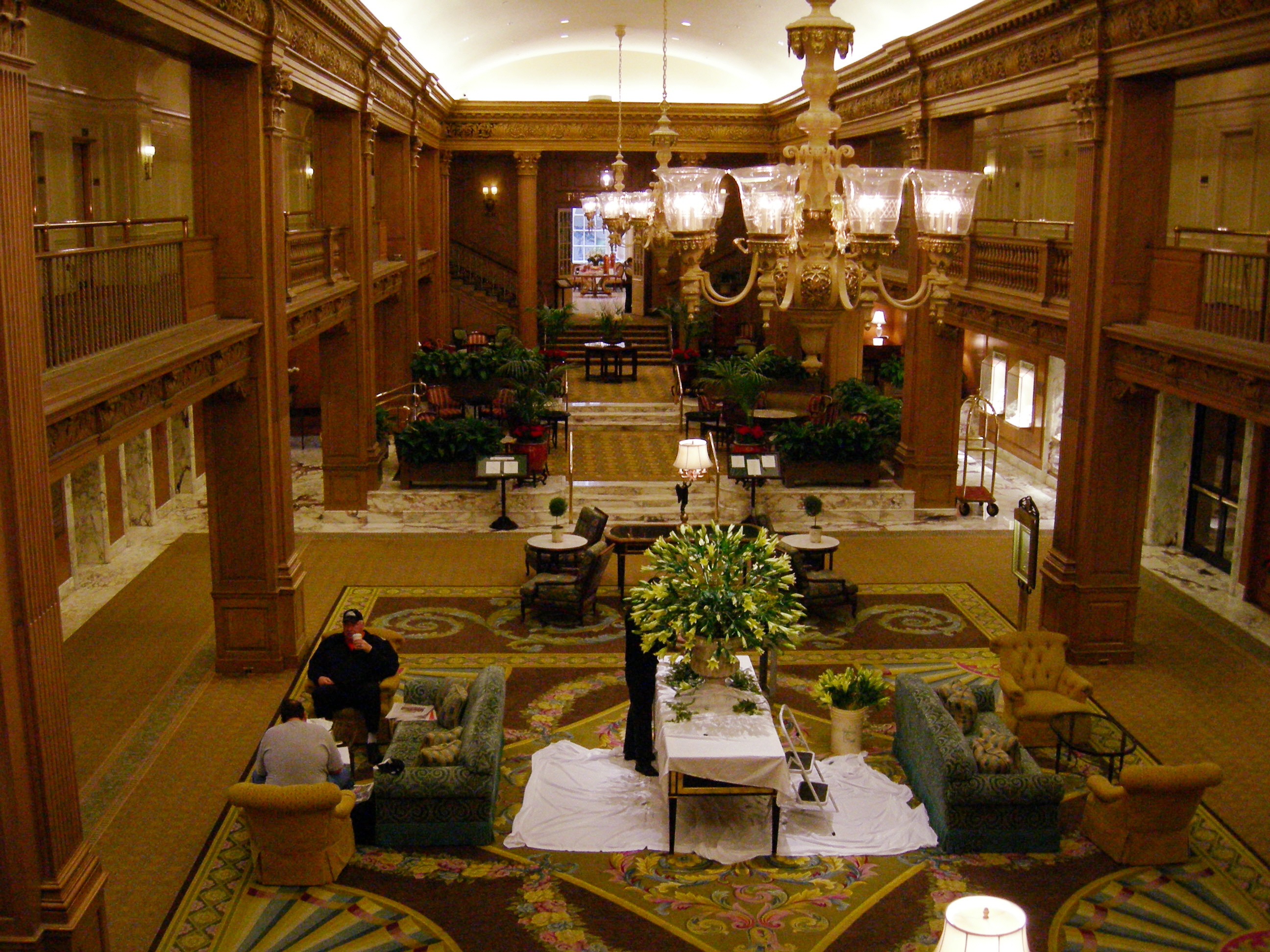
Lobby of the Fairmont Olympic Hotel, in the Metropolitan Tract.

The Metropolitan Tract is an area of land in downtown Seattle owned by the University of Washington. Originally covering 10 acres (40,000 m^{2}), the 1962 purchase of land for a garage for the Olympic Hotel expanded the plot to 11 acres (45,000 m^{2}). The Metropolitan Tract is primarily located in a rectangle formed by Seneca St., Third Ave., Union St., and Sixth Ave.

== History ==
The tract includes the original site of the University of Washington campus. In 1895 the university moved to its present site. Initially, the University's new law school used one of the old university buildings, and the main, original building was leased first to Seattle Public Schools and then to the Seattle Public Library. As the construction of commercial buildings began, this original building was moved a few blocks to a site along Fifth Avenue. However, the building fell into increasing disrepair, and an effort led by Edmond Meany to move it to the new campus and rehabilitate it was unsuccessful.

The state legislature had authorized the university regents to lease or sell the downtown tract. On December 9, 1902, the regents voted to lease rather than sell, although one strip on the northwest corner of the site was sold to the U.S. government for a federal building, on the assumption that this building would increase the value of the rest of the tract.

The initial 1902 lessee, the University Site Improvement Company, began construction on the building for the Seattle Post-Intelligencer, but the lease was soon forfeited. Next, the land was leased on November 1, 1904, by James A. Moore, who completed the P-I building and oversaw the continuation of Fourth Avenue through the old campus. In 1907, the same year he opened the Moore Theatre and Hotel, Moore transferred the remaining 47 years of his lease to the Metropolitan Building Company who engaged the New York firm of Howells & Stokes to assemble a master plan for integrated development. Howells & Stokes intended to create a "city within a city." At the time, it was the largest development of a downtown site undertaken in the United States.

Howells & Stokes' design included a department store, offices, a hotel, housing, and a small plaza, all to be built in a similar style and scale. All buildings in the tract were to be 11 stories tall, with terracotta ornamentation at the top and street levels and brick in between. Their decoration would combine elements of the Beaux Arts and commercial (Chicago school) styles, such as symmetry and a clearly marked storefront. Ten structures were proposed; of these, five were actually built.

Howells & Stokes employed Abraham H. Albertson in Seattle to be their local representative and oversee the construction. After the firm closed in 1917, Albertson and other former employees continued the project under the successor firm Howells & Albertson. As of 2007, the Cobb Building is the only one of the original buildings to survive.

Currently, the Metropolitan Tract contains over 1.4 million square feet (130,000 m^{2}) of rentable office space, over 200,000 square feet (19,000 m^{2}) of rentable commercial space, some 450 hotel rooms, and access to over 2,000 parking spaces. The tract is managed and operated through two long-term leases: one with Legacy Hotels for The Fairmont Olympic Hotel and garage, and the other with UNICO Properties, Inc., for all the other buildings in the Tract.

== Buildings of note in the Metropolitan Tract ==
The following buildings in the Metropolitan Tract are on the National Register of Historic Places

- Cobb Building - 1305 Fourth Avenue, Seattle 98101
- Fairmont Olympic Hotel - 411 University Street, Seattle 98101
- Skinner Building - 1326 Fifth Avenue, Seattle 98101
- 5th Avenue Theatre - 1308 5th Ave, Seattle, WA 98101, in the Skinner Building

Other buildings of note in the Metropolitan Tract are:

- Financial Center - 1215 Fourth Avenue, Seattle 98161
- 1200 Fifth - 1200 Fifth Avenue, Seattle 98101
- Puget Sound Plaza - 1325 Fourth Avenue, Seattle 98101
- Rainier Tower and Rainier Square - 1301 Fifth Avenue, Seattle 98101

Former buildings of the Metropolitan Tract include:

- The Metropolitan Theatre
- Seattle Ice Arena
- White, Henry, Stuart buildings (similar to Cobb Building) - 410 University Street, Seattle (now Rainier Tower)

== Recent development ==
In 2013, the University of Washington announced plans to redevelop the Rainier Square shopping mall, adjacent to the Rainier Tower, at the expiration of the long-term lease signed with Unico Properties in 2014. The resulting project replaced the mall with the Rainier Square Tower, a 58-story mixed-use skyscraper that included 710,000 square feet (66,000 m^{2}) of office space, 220 residential units, and a 165-room hotel. Construction began on the Rainier Square Tower in 2017 and was completed in 2020.

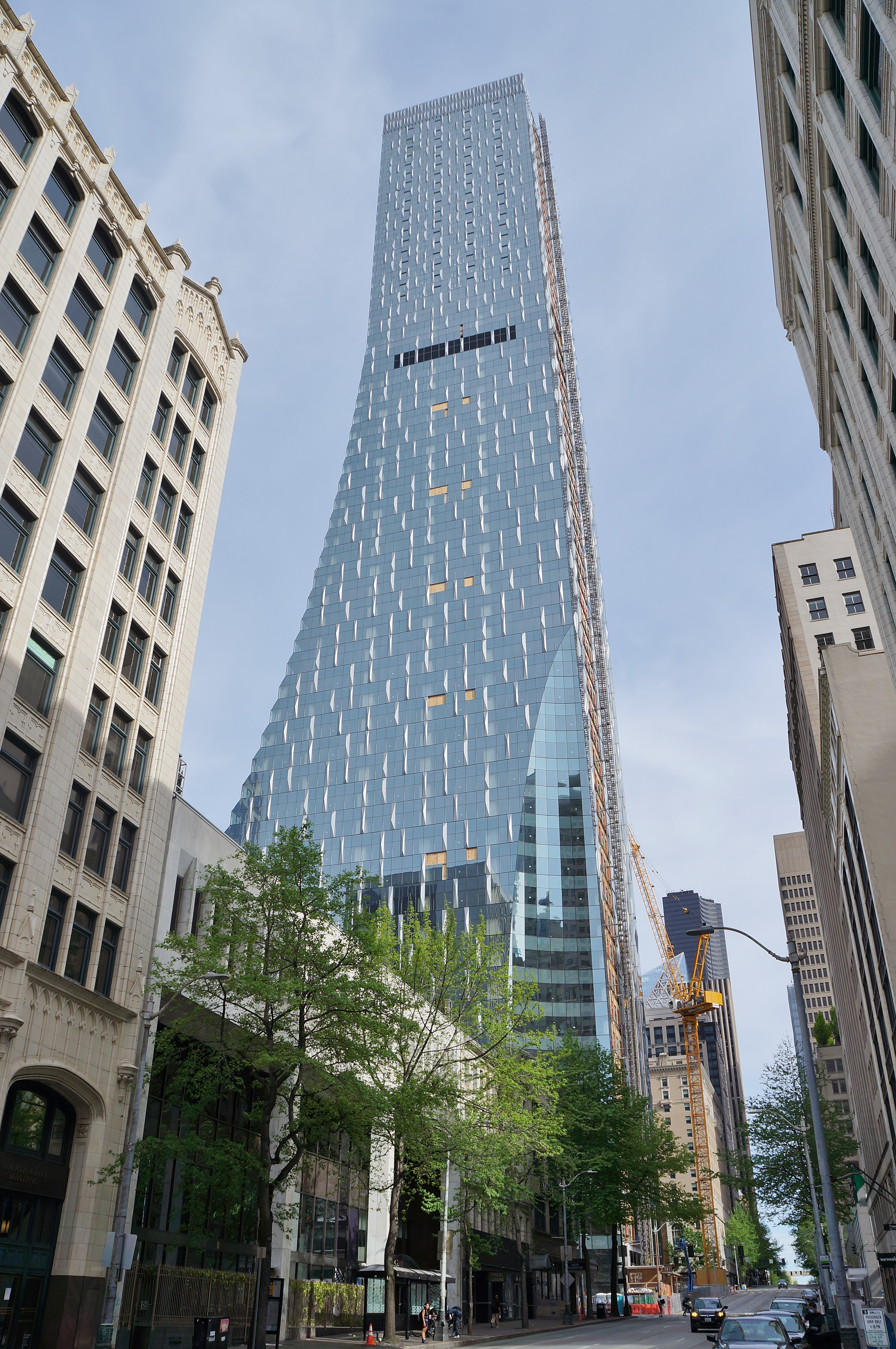
Rainier Square Tower, May 2020 from 4th Avenue and Union Street
