= List of works by Minoru Yamasaki =

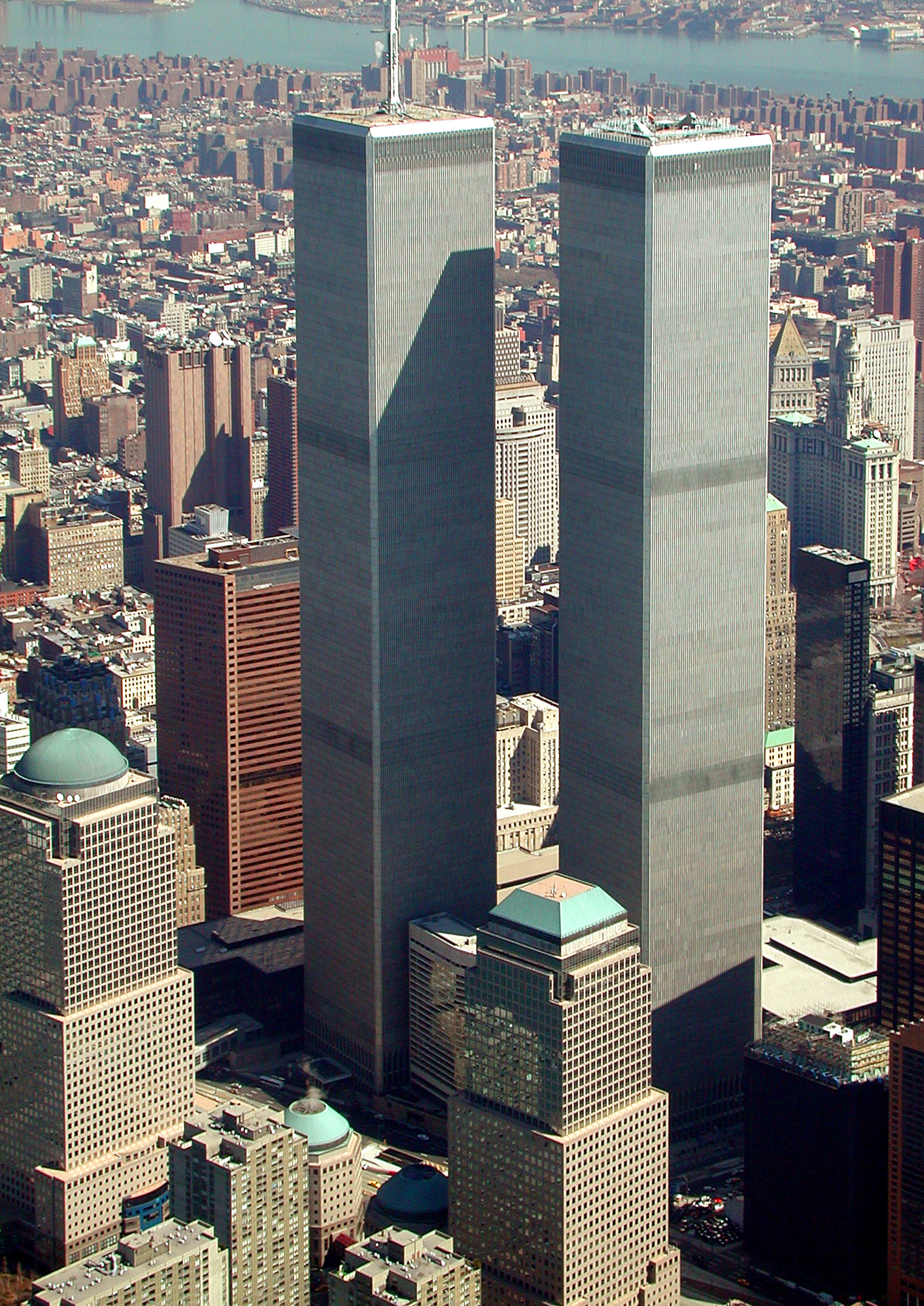
The original World Trade Center in 2001, the most well known buildings designed by Yamasaki.

This is a list of works by architect Minoru Yamasaki.

- Federal Reserve Bank of Chicago Detroit Branch Building annex, Detroit, Michigan, 1951
- Pruitt–Igoe housing project, St. Louis, Missouri, 1954 (demolished in 1972)
- Gratiot Urban Redevelopment Project, Detroit, Michigan, 1954
- University Liggett School, Main Campus, Grosse Pointe, Michigan, 1954
- Military Personnel Records Center, St. Louis, Missouri, 1955
- Land's Pharmacy, Royal Oak, Michigan, 1955
- United States Consulate in Kobe, Japan 1955
- Lambert-St. Louis International Airport main terminal, 1956
- Woodrow Wilson Elementary School Westland, Michigan, 1956 (demolished in August, 1998)
- Birmingham Unitarian Church, Bloomfield Hills, Michigan, 1956
- McGregor Memorial Conference Center, Wayne State University, Detroit, 1957
- College for Creative Studies, Yamasaki Building, Detroit, 1957
- First United Methodist Church, Warren, Michigan, 1957
- Albert Schweitzer Elementary School, Westland, Michigan, 1957
- John Marshall Junior High School, Westland, Michigan, 1958
- Michigan State Medical Society building, East Lansing, Michigan, 1959
- Prentis Building and DeRoy Auditorium Complex, Wayne State University, Detroit, 1959
- Reynolds Metals Regional Sales Office, Southfield, Michigan, 1959
- United States Pavilion, World Agricultural Fair, New Delhi, India, 1959
- Columbia Records Pitman Pressing Plant, Pitman, New Jersey, 1960
- Dhahran International Airport - Civil Air Terminal, Saudi Arabia, 1961
- Carleton College buildings: Olin Hall of Science 1961, Goodhue Dormitory 1962, West Gym 1964, Cowling Rec Center 1965, Watson Hall 1966 and 1961 4th Floor addition to Myers Hall, Northfield, Minnesota
- Master plan for Wascana Centre and buildings for the University of Regina, including the Dr. John Archer Library, Regina, Saskatchewan, 1961–1967
- Pacific Science Center (formerly known as the Federal Science Pavilion for Seattle's Century 21 World's Fair), Seattle, Washington, 1962
- Irwin Library, Butler University, Indianapolis, Indiana, 1963
- Michigan Consolidated Gas Building - (Now One Woodward Avenue), Detroit, Michigan, 1963
- Daniell Heights married student housing, Michigan Technological University, Houghton, Michigan, 1963
- Oberlin Conservatory of Music (photo), Oberlin College, Ohio, 1963
- IBM Building, Seattle, Washington, 1963
- North Shore Congregation Israel, Glencoe, Illinois 1964
- Northwestern National Life Building (now Voya Financial), Minneapolis, Minnesota, 1964
- Queen Emma Gardens (two high-rise towers), Honolulu, Hawaii, 1964
- Engineering Sciences Laboratory, Harvard University, Cambridge, Massachusetts,
- Robertson Hall, Princeton School of Public and International Affairs, Princeton University, Princeton, New Jersey, 1965
- William James Hall Behavioral Sciences Building (William James Hall), Harvard University, Cambridge, Massachusetts, 1965
- Century Plaza Hotel, Los Angeles, California, 1966
- King Building, Oberlin College, 1966
- Peyton Hall, Department of Astrophysical Sciences, Princeton University, Princeton, New Jersey, 1966
- Quo Vadis Entertainment Center, Westland, Michigan, 1966 (demolished in June 2011)
- M&T Bank Center, Buffalo, New York, 1967
- Japan Center, San Francisco, California, 1968
- 1350 Ala Moana, Honolulu, Hawaii, 1968
- Eastern Airlines Terminal, (Logan Airport Terminal A) Boston, Massachusetts, 1969 (demolished in 2002).
- World Trade Center - Tower 1, Tower 2, Building 4, Building 5 and Building 6, 1970–1975, New York City (destroyed on September 11, 2001)
- Montgomery Ward Corporate Headquarters Tower, Chicago, Illinois, 1972 (converted into high-rise residential condominiums in 2005)
- Minoru and Teruko Yamasaki House, Bloomfield Township, Michigan, 1972
- Temple Beth El, Bloomfield Township, Michigan 1974
- Century Plaza Towers, Los Angeles, 1975
- U.S. Bank Tower, Denver, 1975
- Tulsa Performing Arts Center, Tulsa, Oklahoma, 1976
- One Government Center (now Michael DiSalle Government Center), Toledo, Ohio, 1976
- Steinman College Center, Franklin and Marshall College, Lancaster, Pennsylvania, 1976
- Bank of Oklahoma, Tulsa, Oklahoma, 1977
- Rainier Bank Tower, Seattle, Washington, 1977
- Federal Reserve Bank of Richmond, Richmond, Virginia, 1978
- Horace Mann Educators Corporation, Springfield, Illinois, 1979
- Sheraton Miyako Hotel Tokyo, Tokyo, Japan, 1979
- 100 Washington Square, Minneapolis, Minnesota, 1981
- Saudi Arabian Monetary Agency Head Office, Riyadh, Saudi Arabia, 1981
- Founder's Hall, Shinji Shumeikai, Shiga Prefecture, Japan, 1982
- Eastern Province International Airport, Saudi Arabia, 1985
- Istanbul Cevahir, Istanbul, Turkey, designed 1987, constructed 1997-2005
- Torre Picasso, Madrid, Spain, 1988
- Columbia Center, Troy, Michigan, 1989–2000
- Colonnade Plaza (formerly the Mutual of Omaha Bank Building), Miami, Florida
- Lincoln Elementary School, Livonia, Michigan (demolished in mid-1980s)
- Medical College of Ohio Hospital and Medical College of Ohio, now University of Toledo
- Shiraz University in Shiraz, Iran
- Grant Elementary School, Livonia, Michigan, 1956

== Gallery of works ==
Selected works
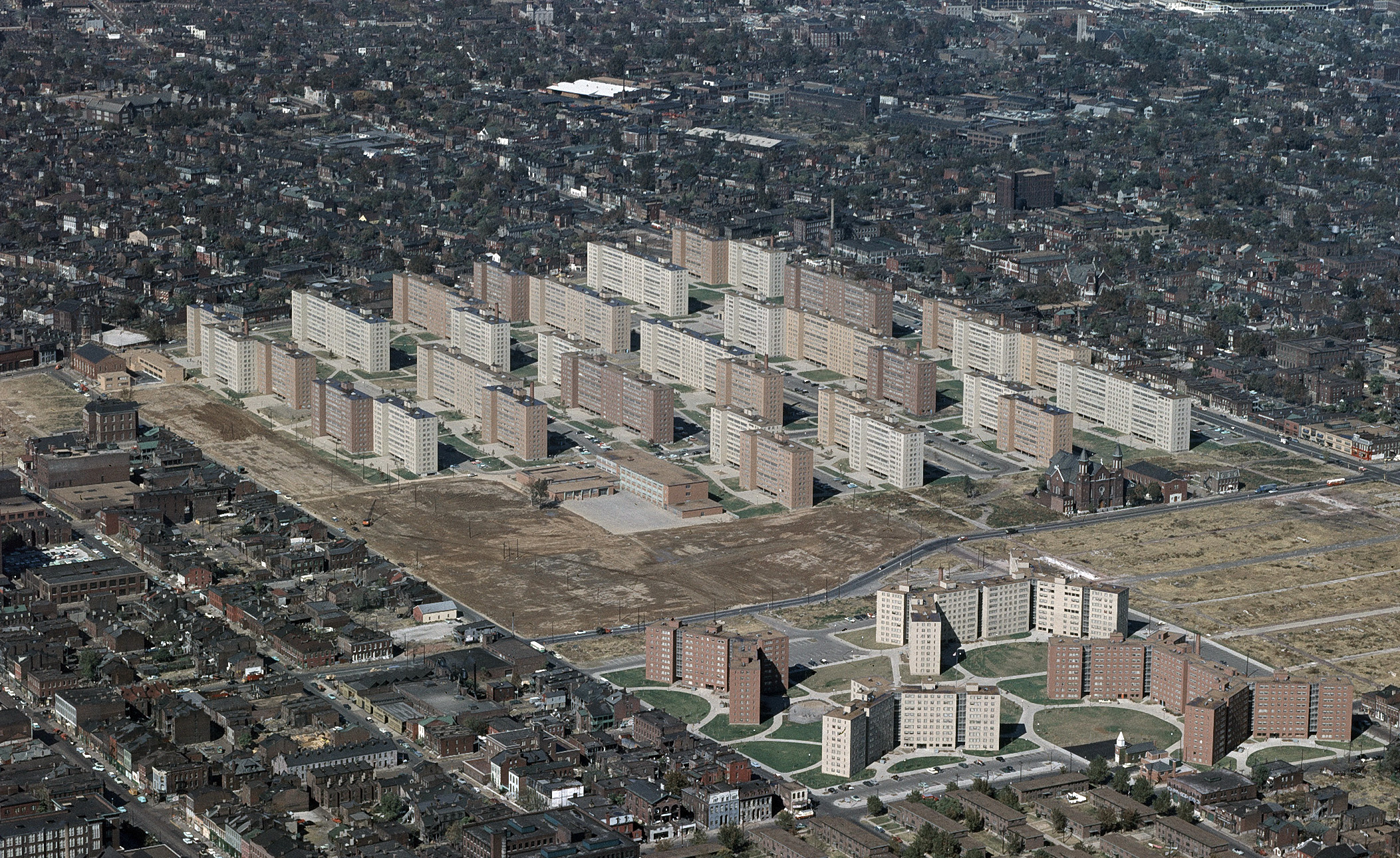
Pruitt–Igoe housing project, St. Louis, 1954 (demolished 1972–1976)

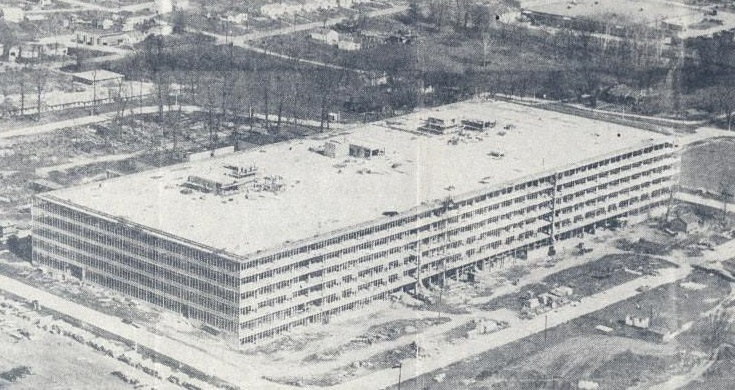
The Military Personnel Records Center, St. Louis, 1955

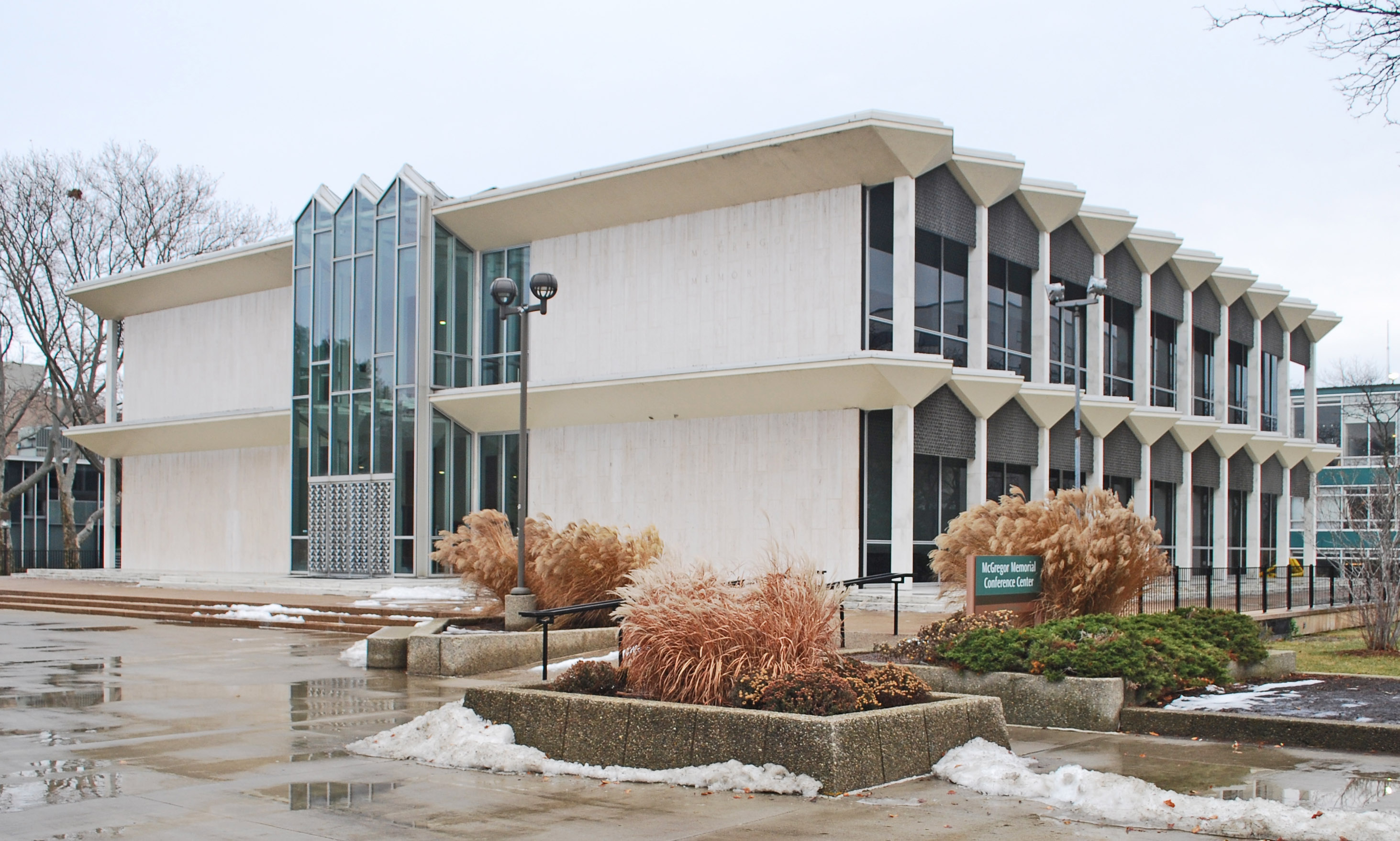
McGregor Memorial Conference Center at Wayne State University, Detroit, 1958

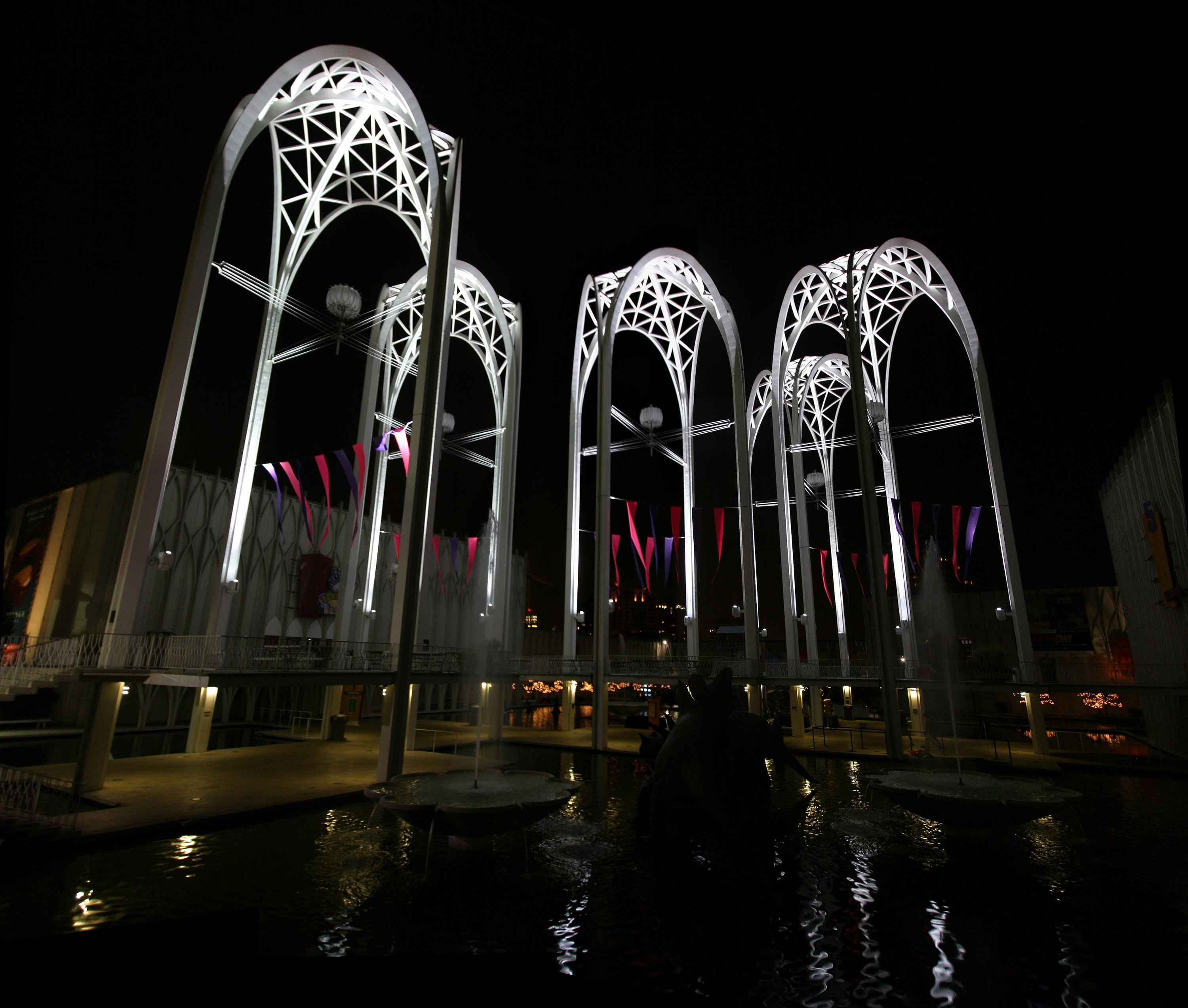
Pacific Science Center, Seattle, 1962

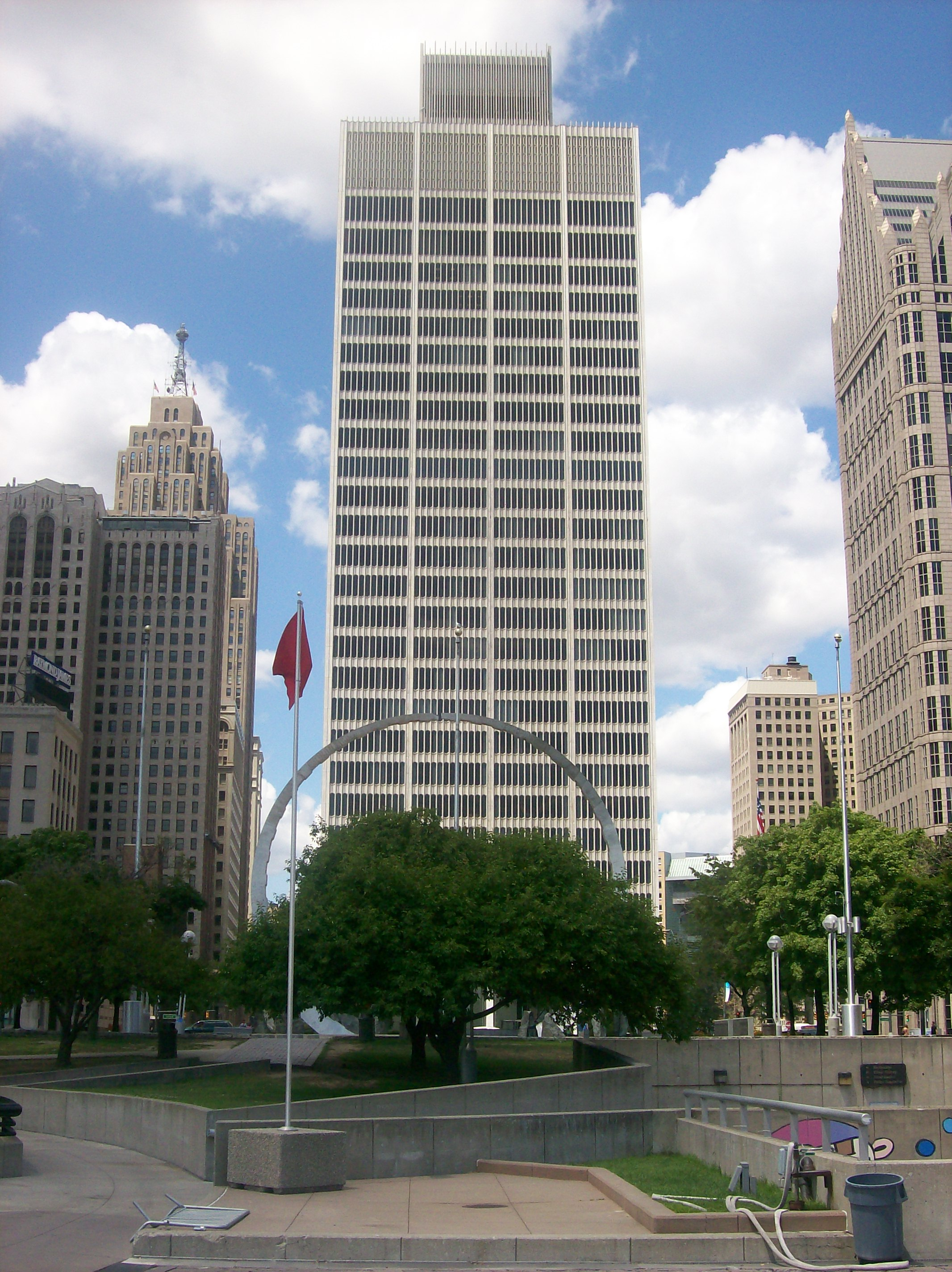
One Woodward Avenue, Detroit, 1962

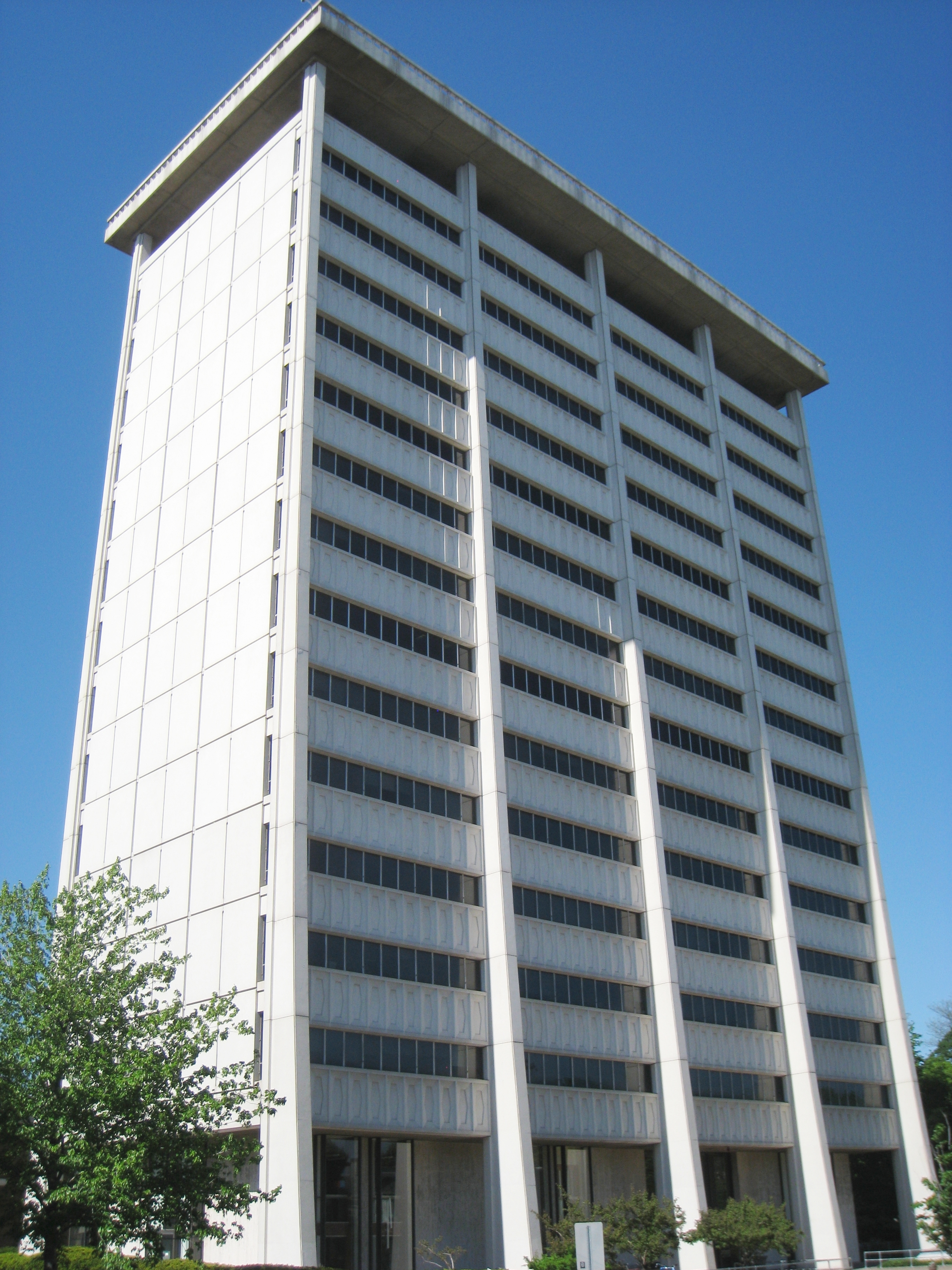
William James Hall at Harvard University, Cambridge, 1963

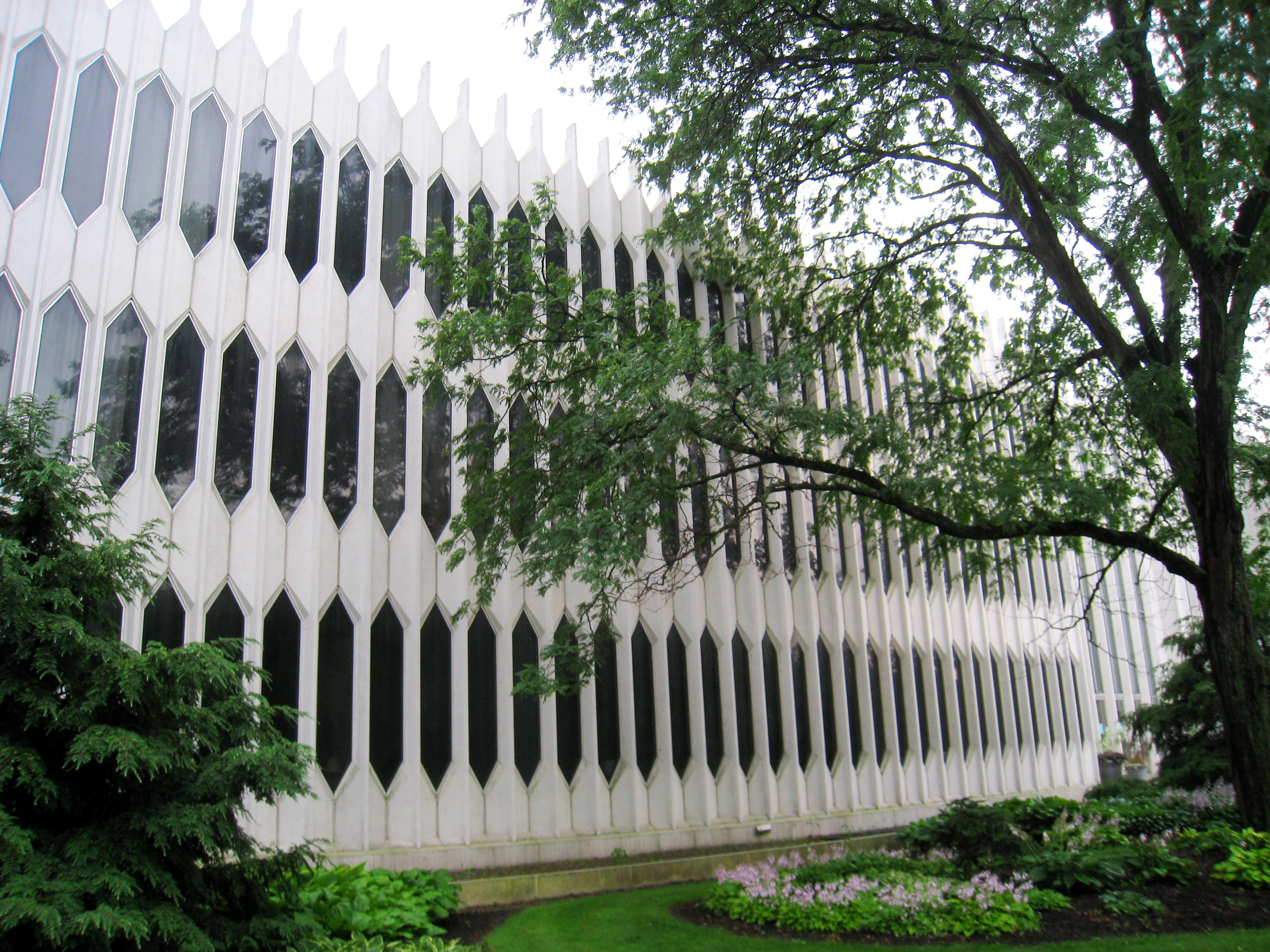
The Conservatory of Music at Oberlin College, Oberlin, Ohio, 1963

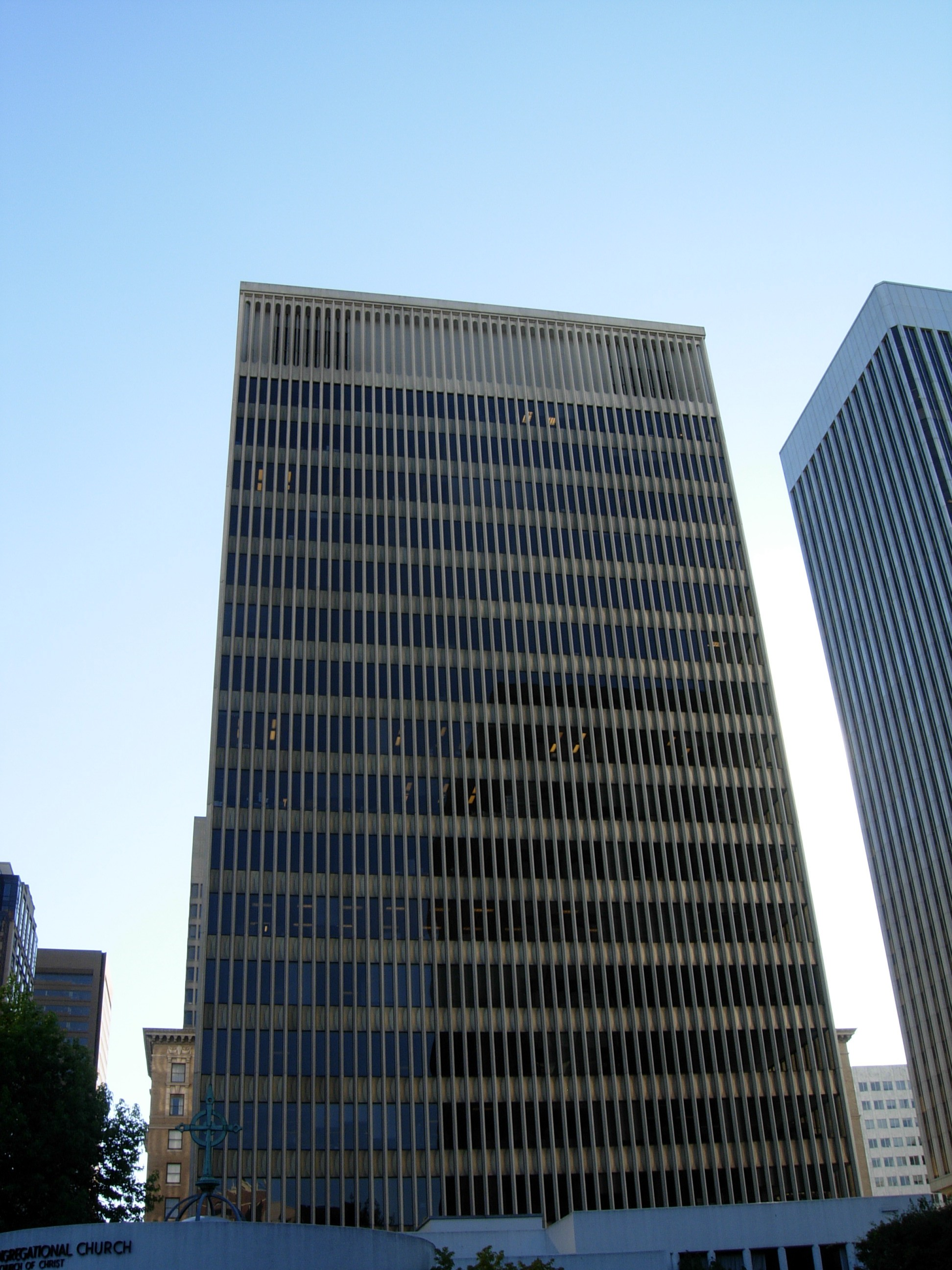
IBM Building, 1200 Fifth Avenue, Seattle, 1964

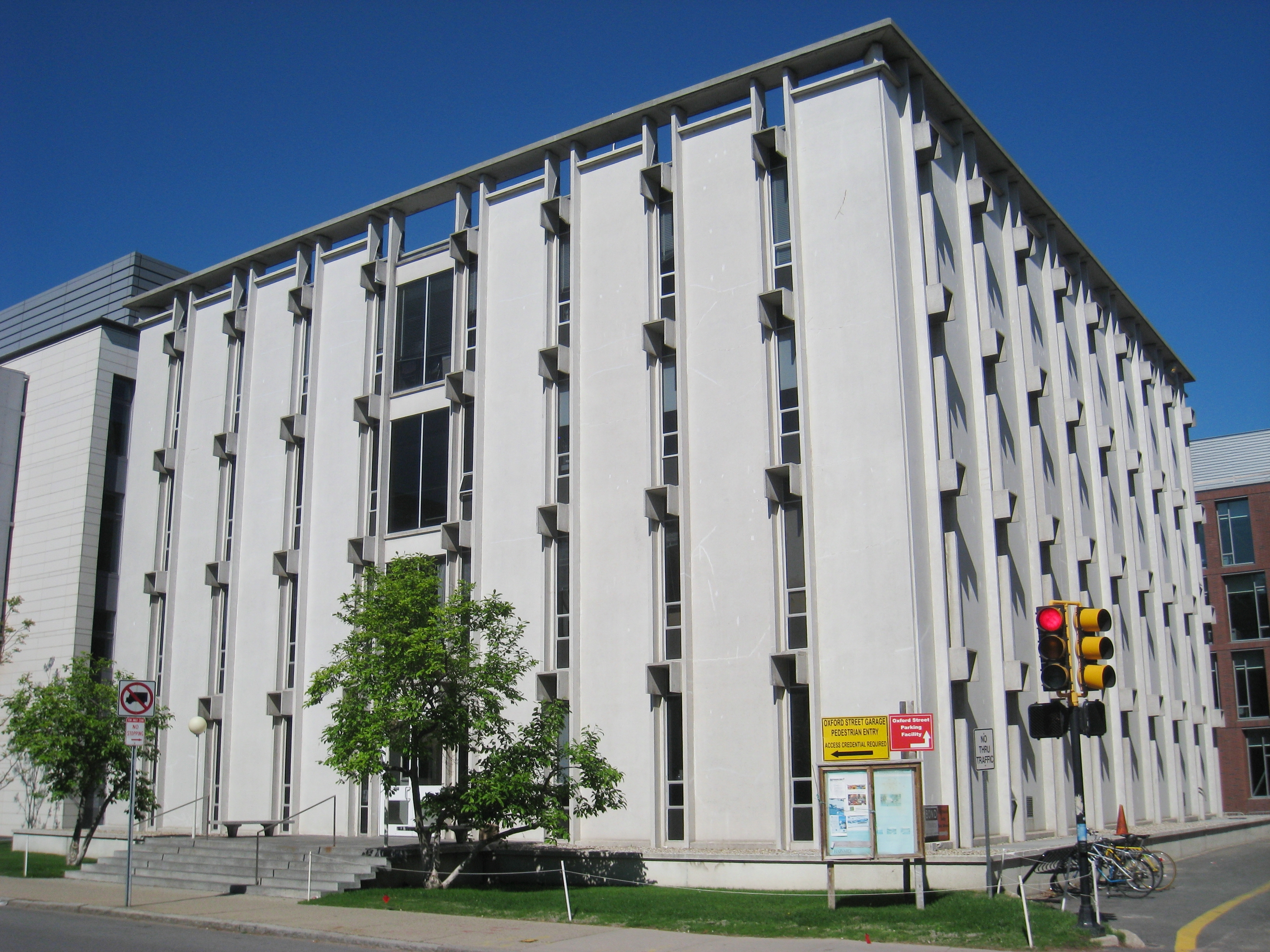
:Engineering Sciences Laboratory at Harvard University, Cambridge, 1964

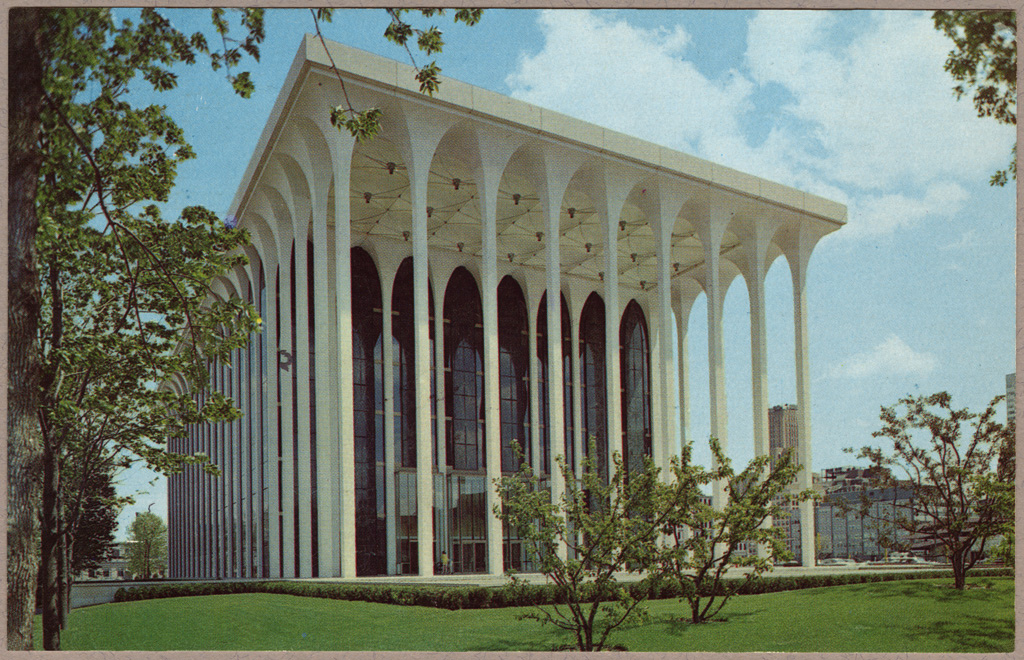
Northwestern National Life Building, Minneapolis, 1965

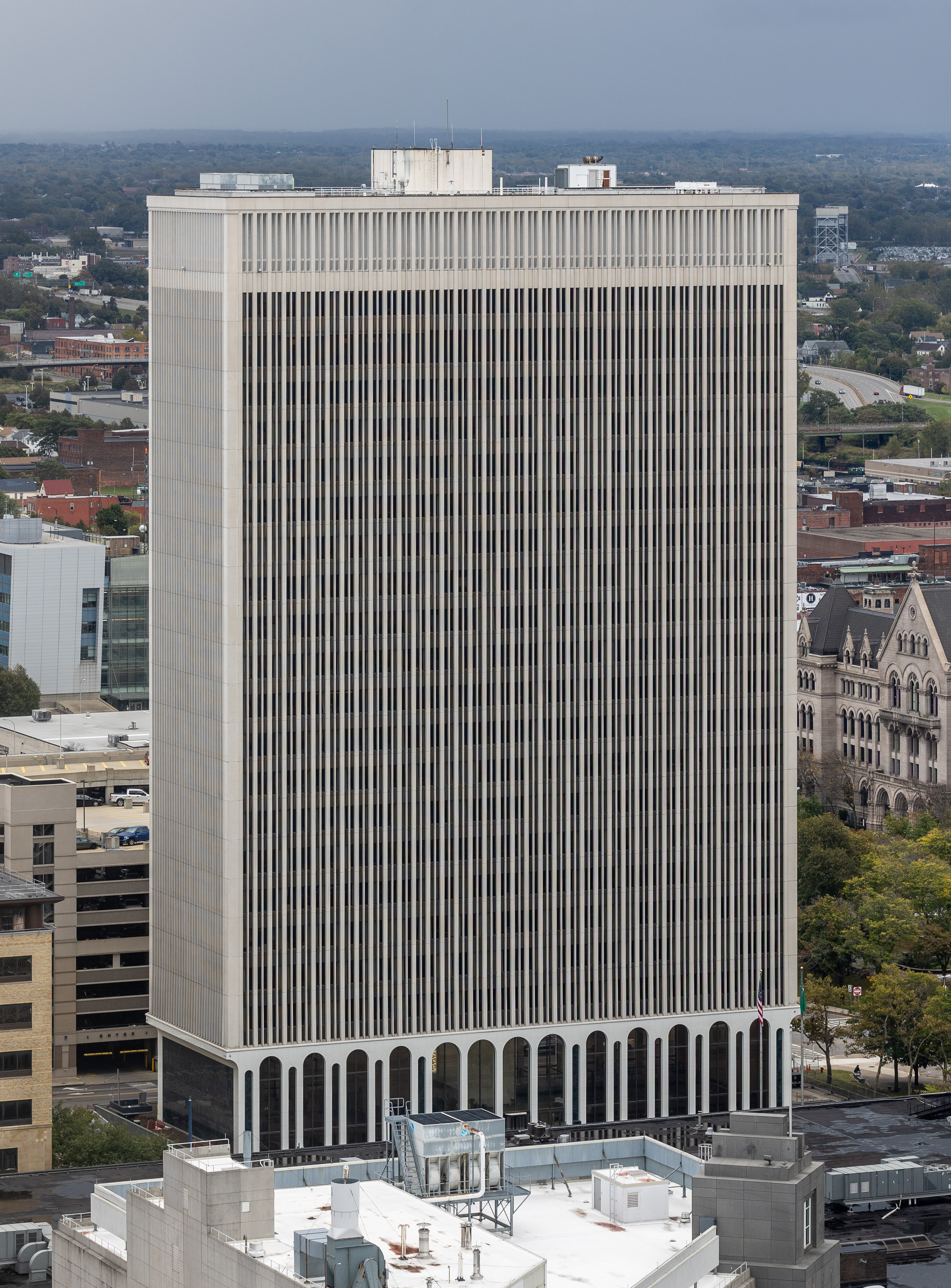
One M&T Plaza, Buffalo, New York, 1966

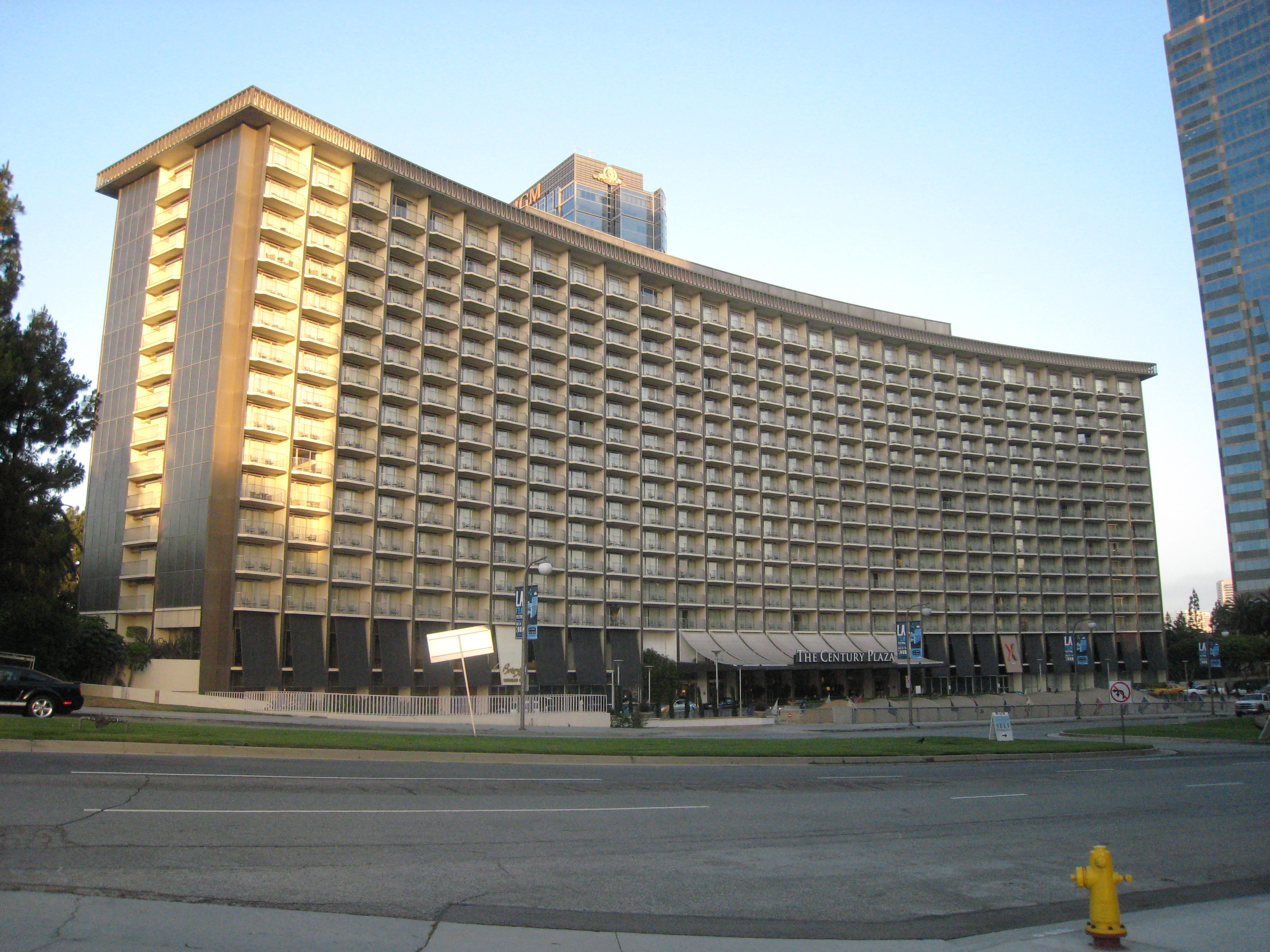
Century Plaza Hotel, Los Angeles, 1966

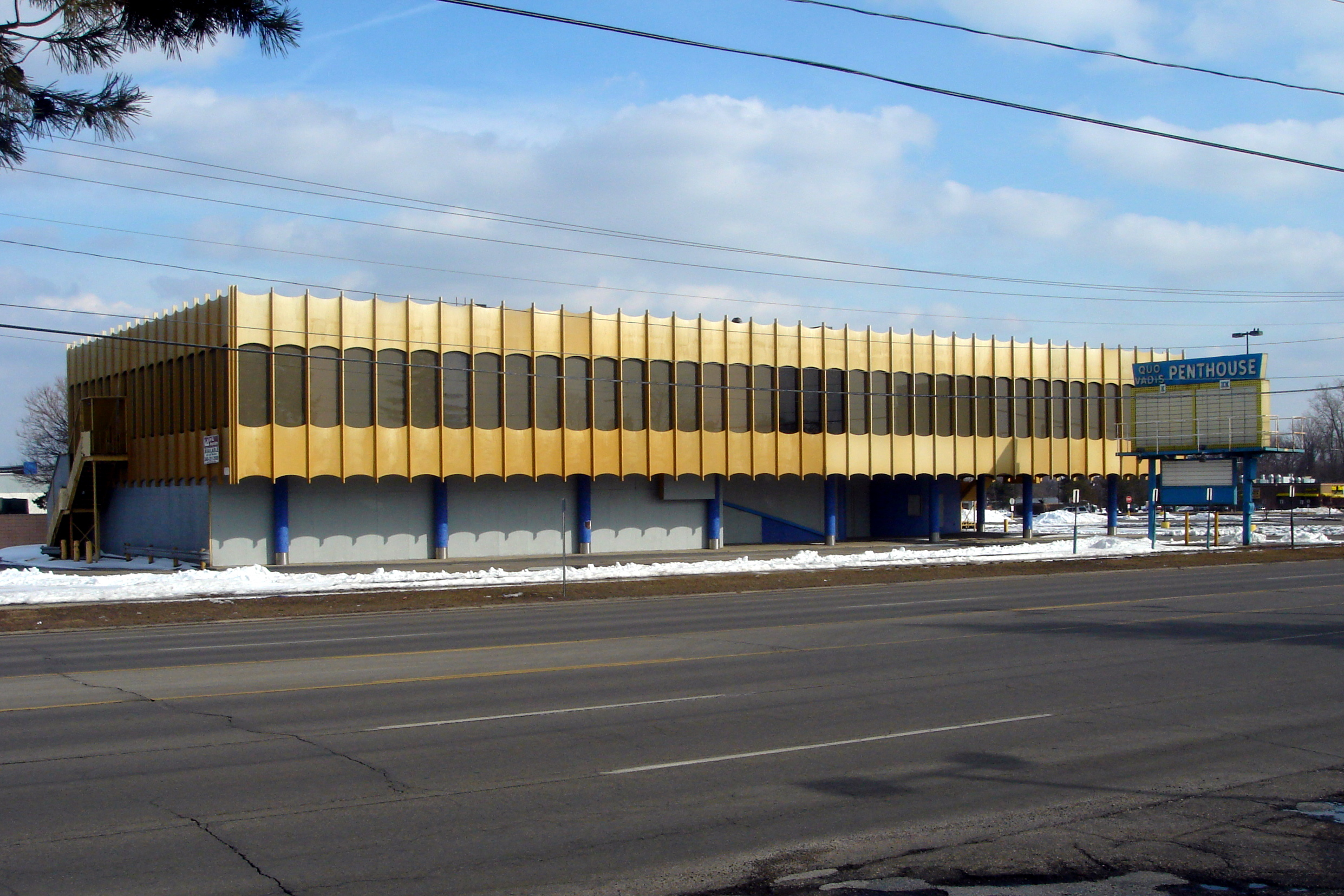
Quo Vadis Entertainment Center, Westland, Michigan, 1966 (demolished in 2011)

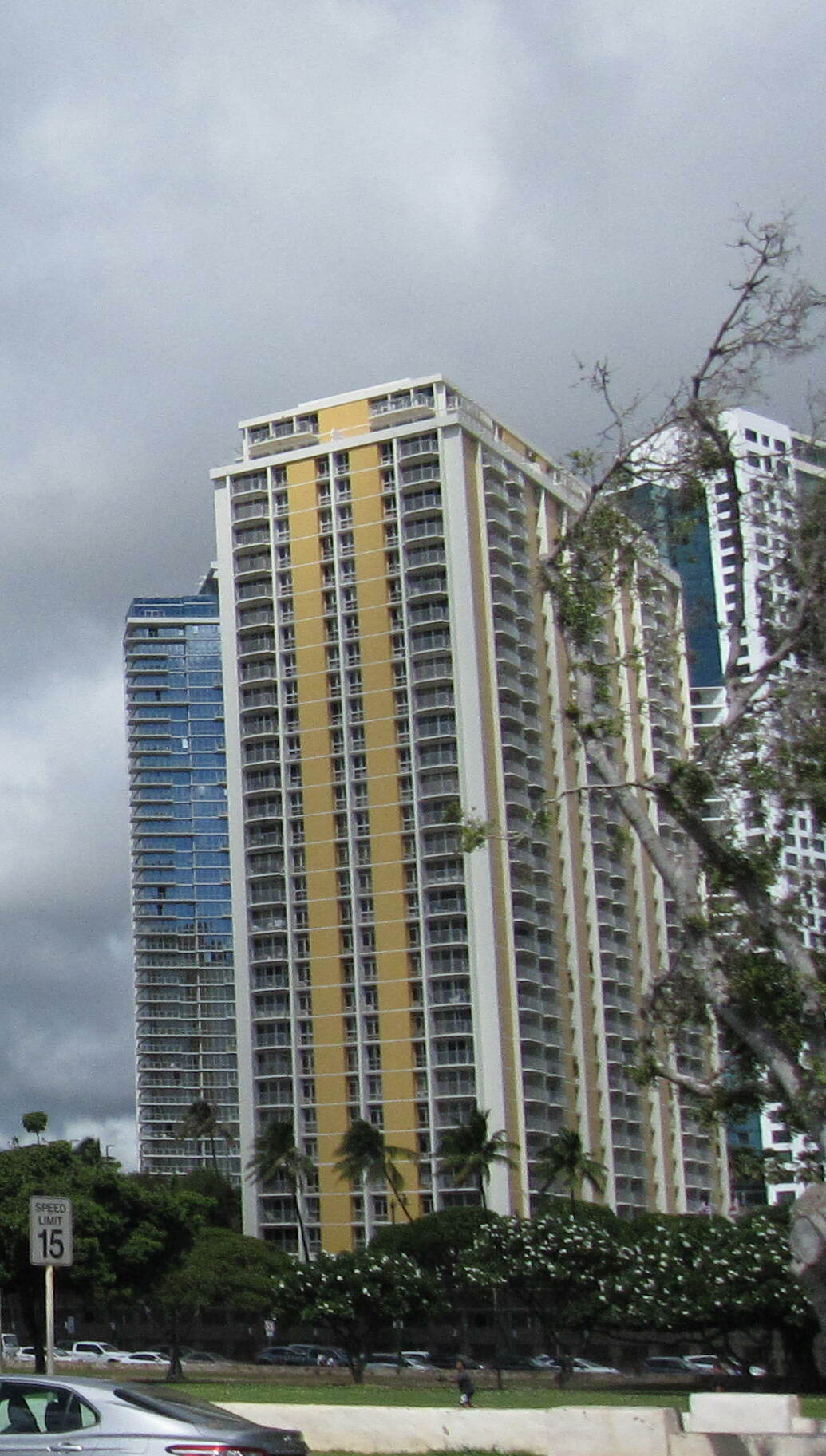
1350 Ala Moana, Honolulu, 1968

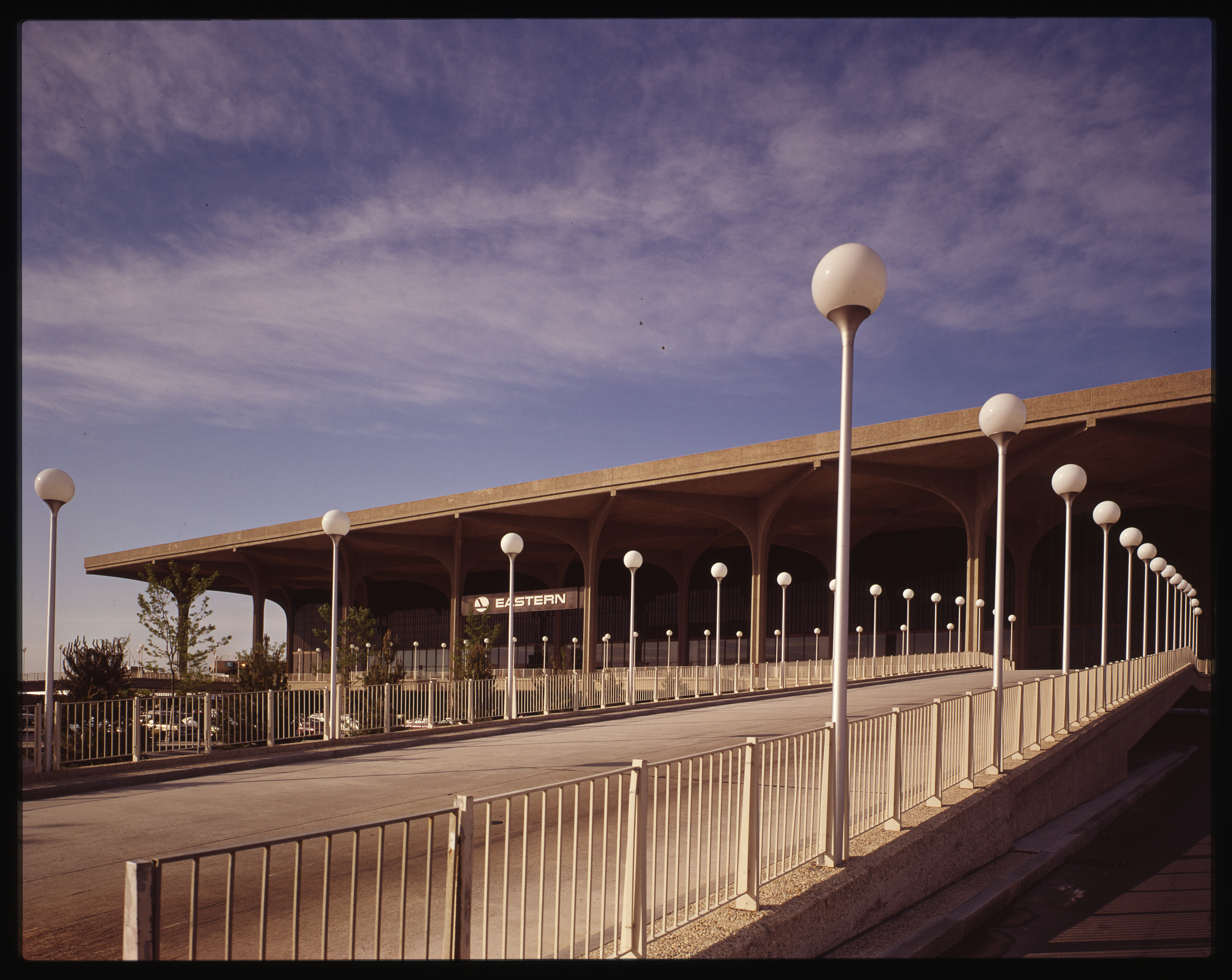
Eastern Airlines Terminal A at Logan Airport, Boston, 1969 (demolished in 2002)

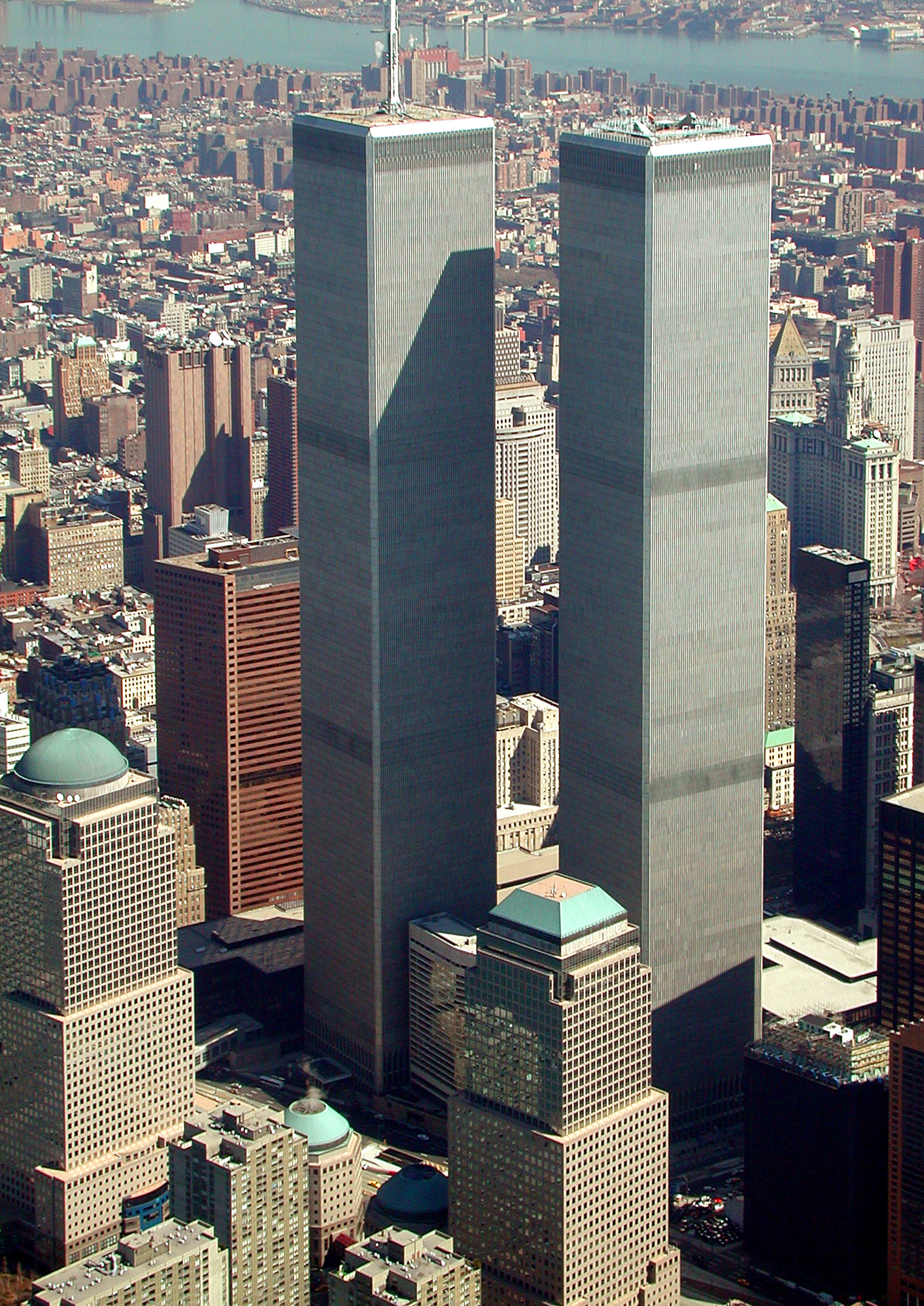
The original World Trade Center, 1970–1971 (destroyed in 2001)

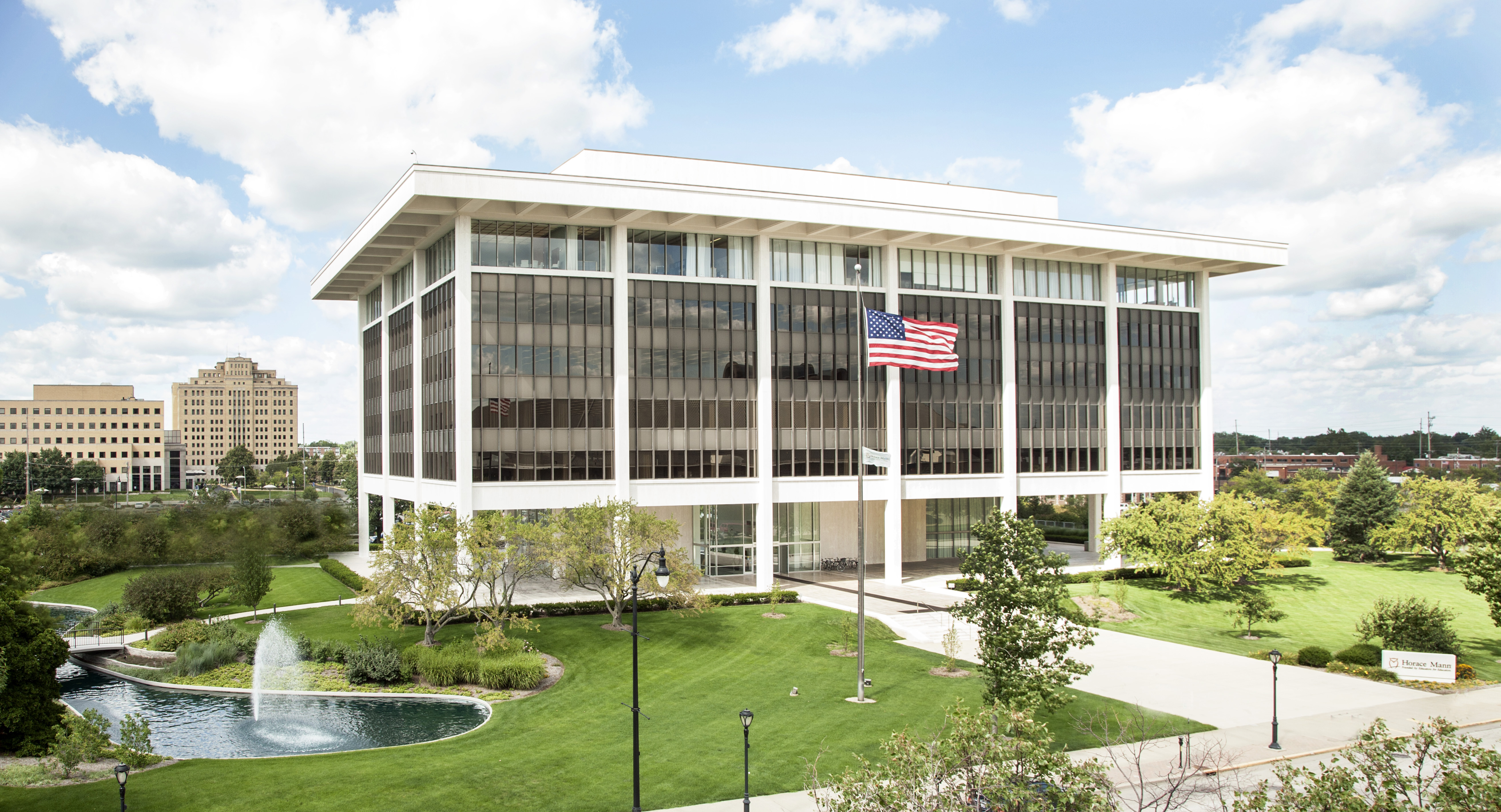
Horace Mann Educators Corporation, Springfield, Illinois, 1972

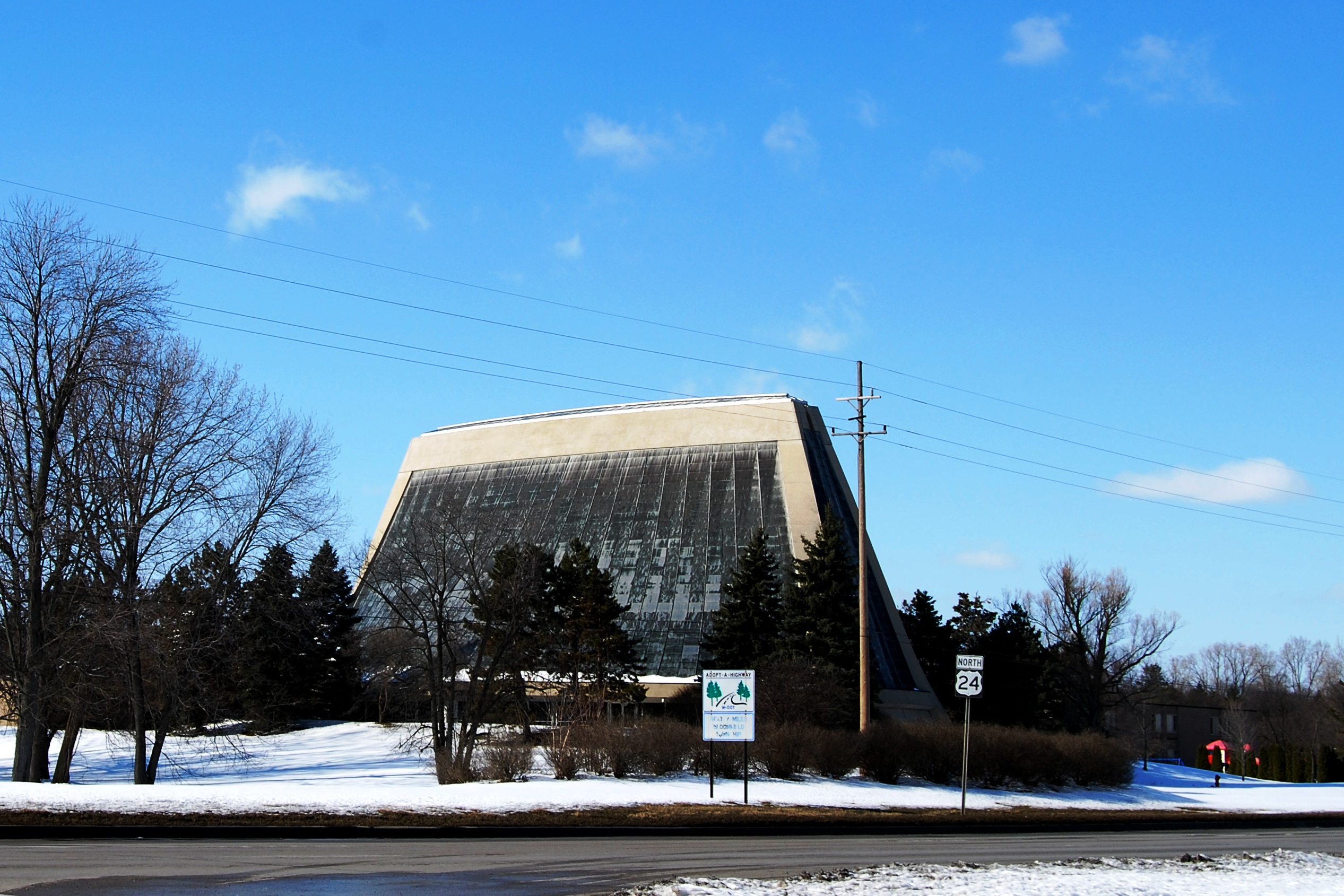
Temple Beth El, Bloomfield Township, Michigan, 1973

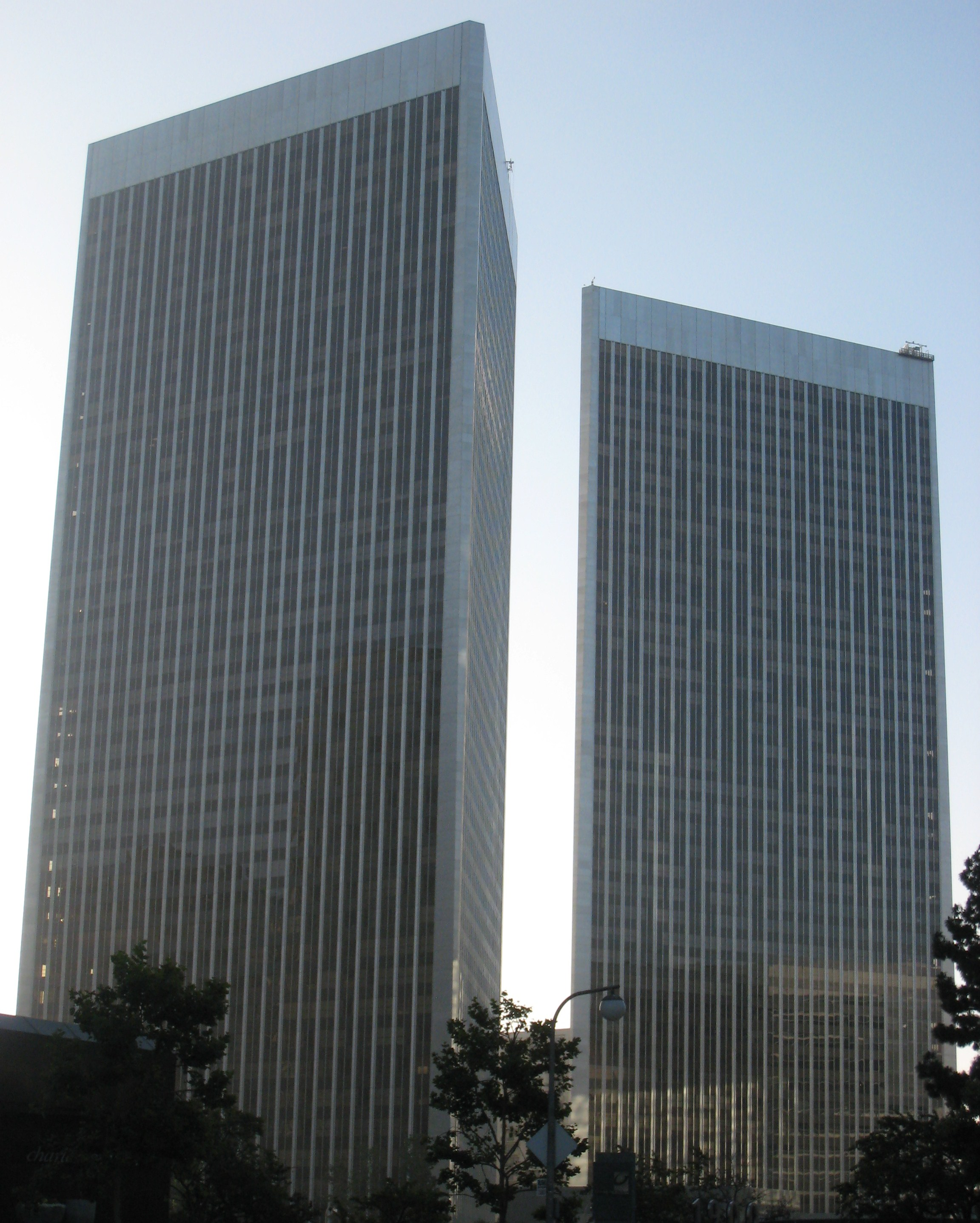
Century Plaza Towers, Los Angeles, 1975

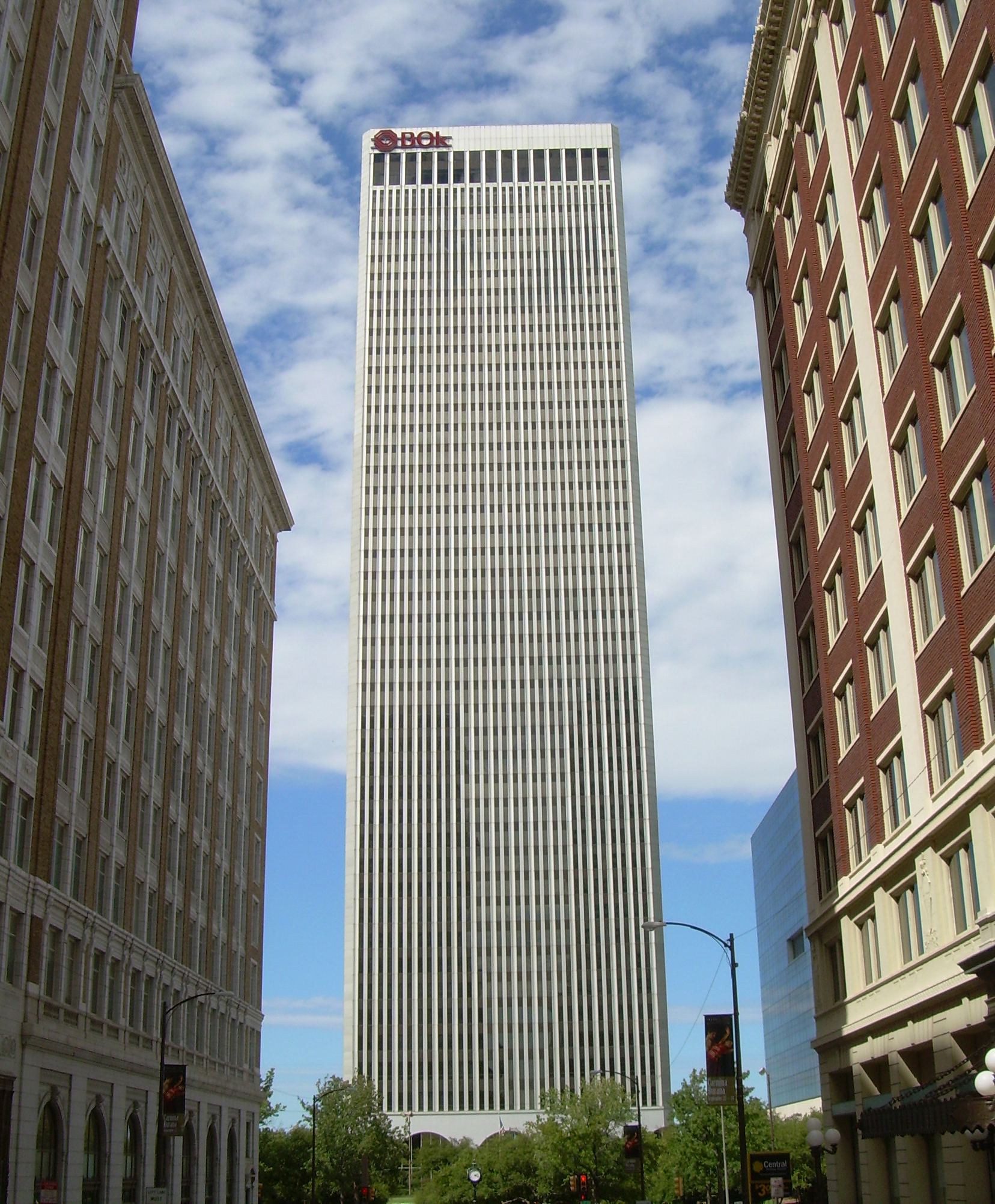
BOK Tower, Tulsa, 1975

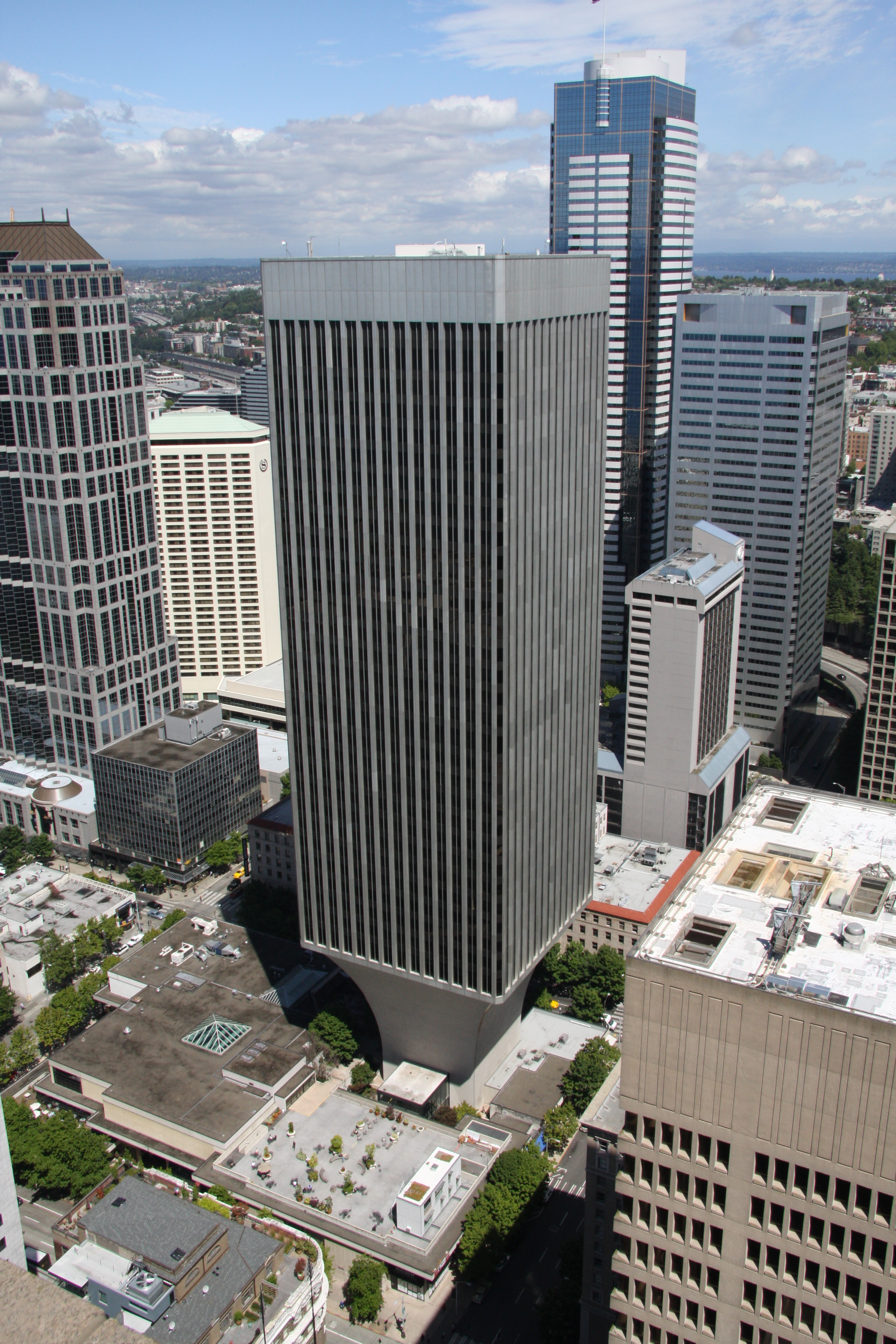
Rainier Tower, Seattle, 1977

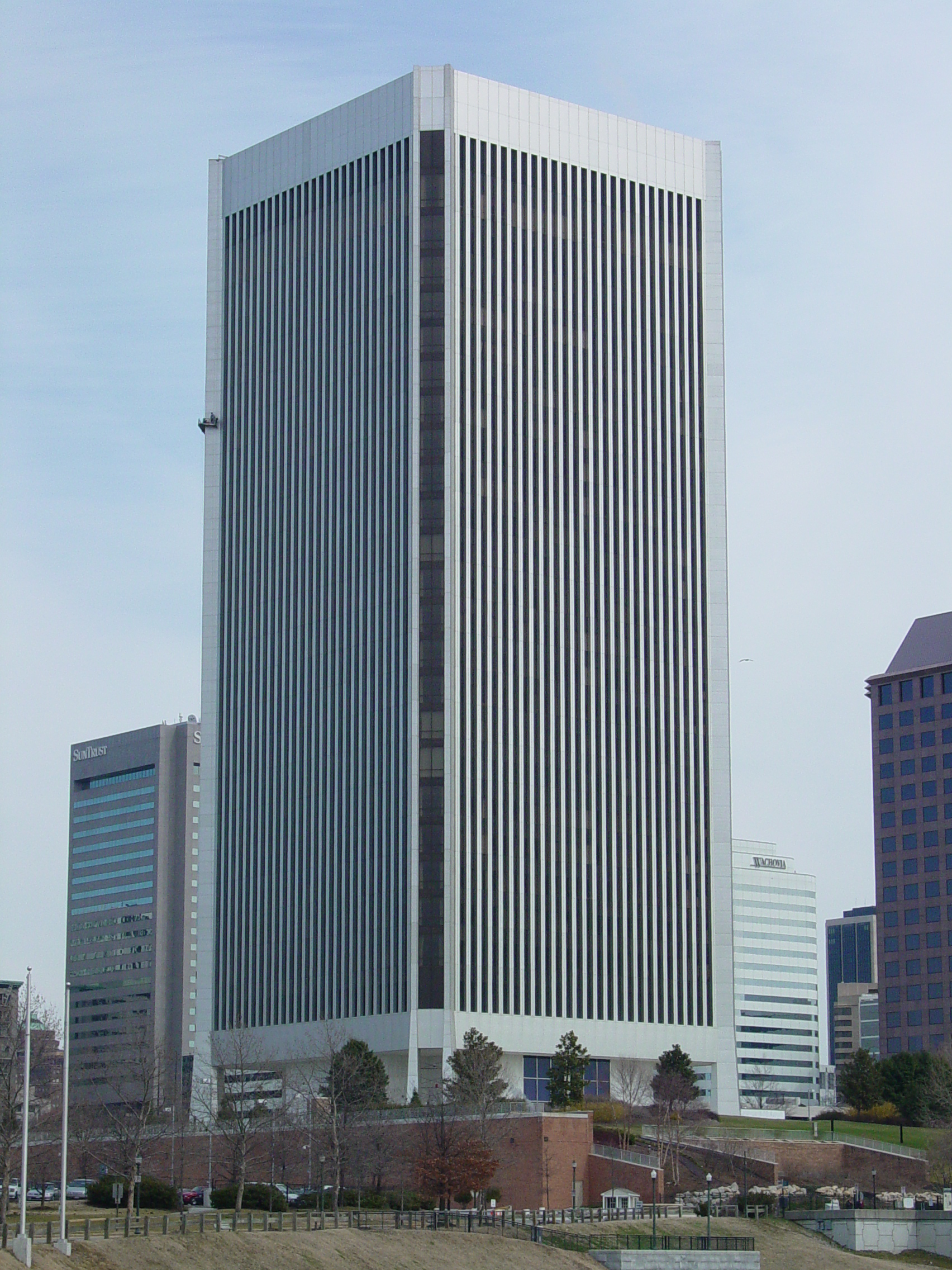
Federal Reserve Bank of Richmond, Richmond, 1978

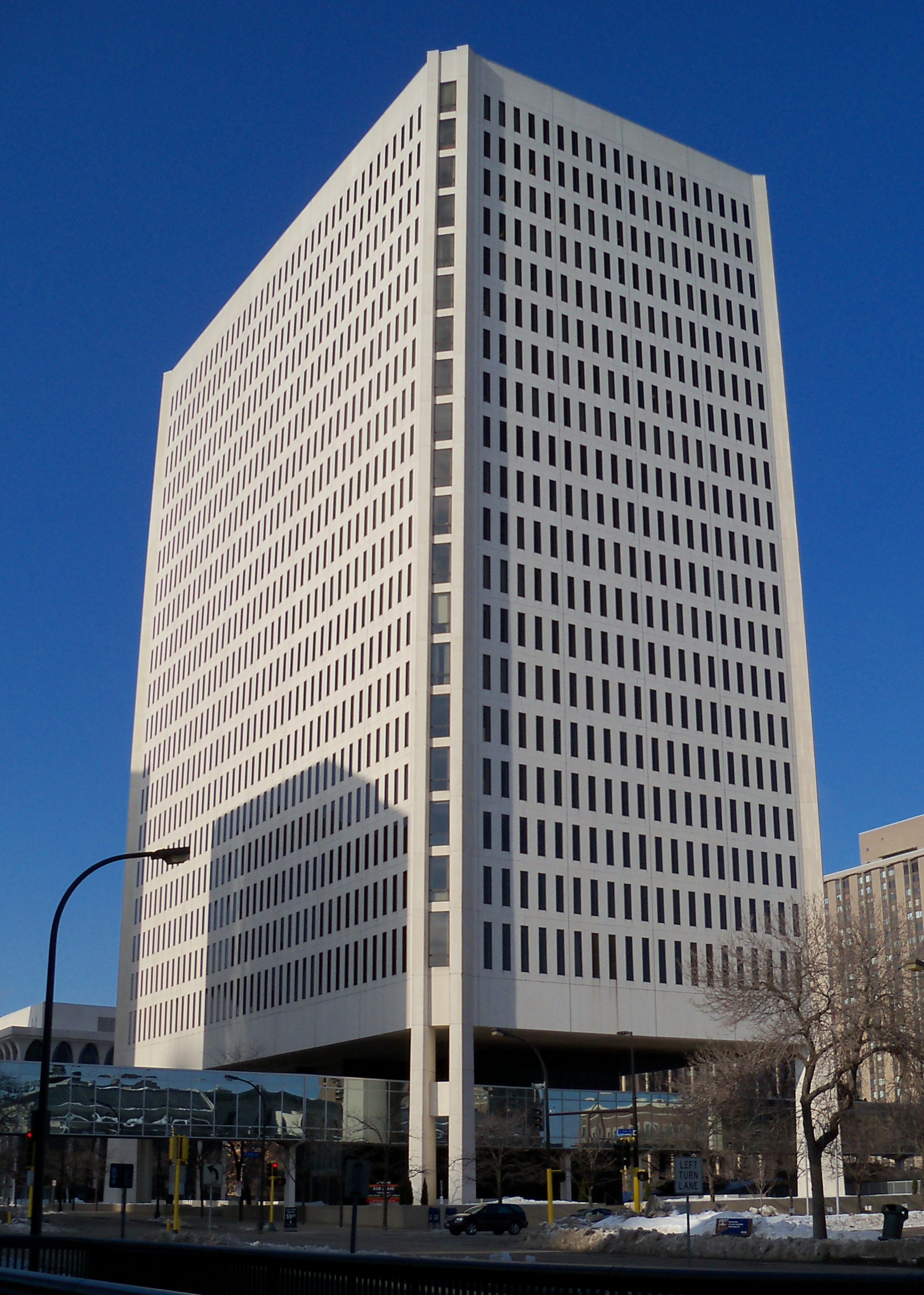
100 Washington Square, Minneapolis, 1982

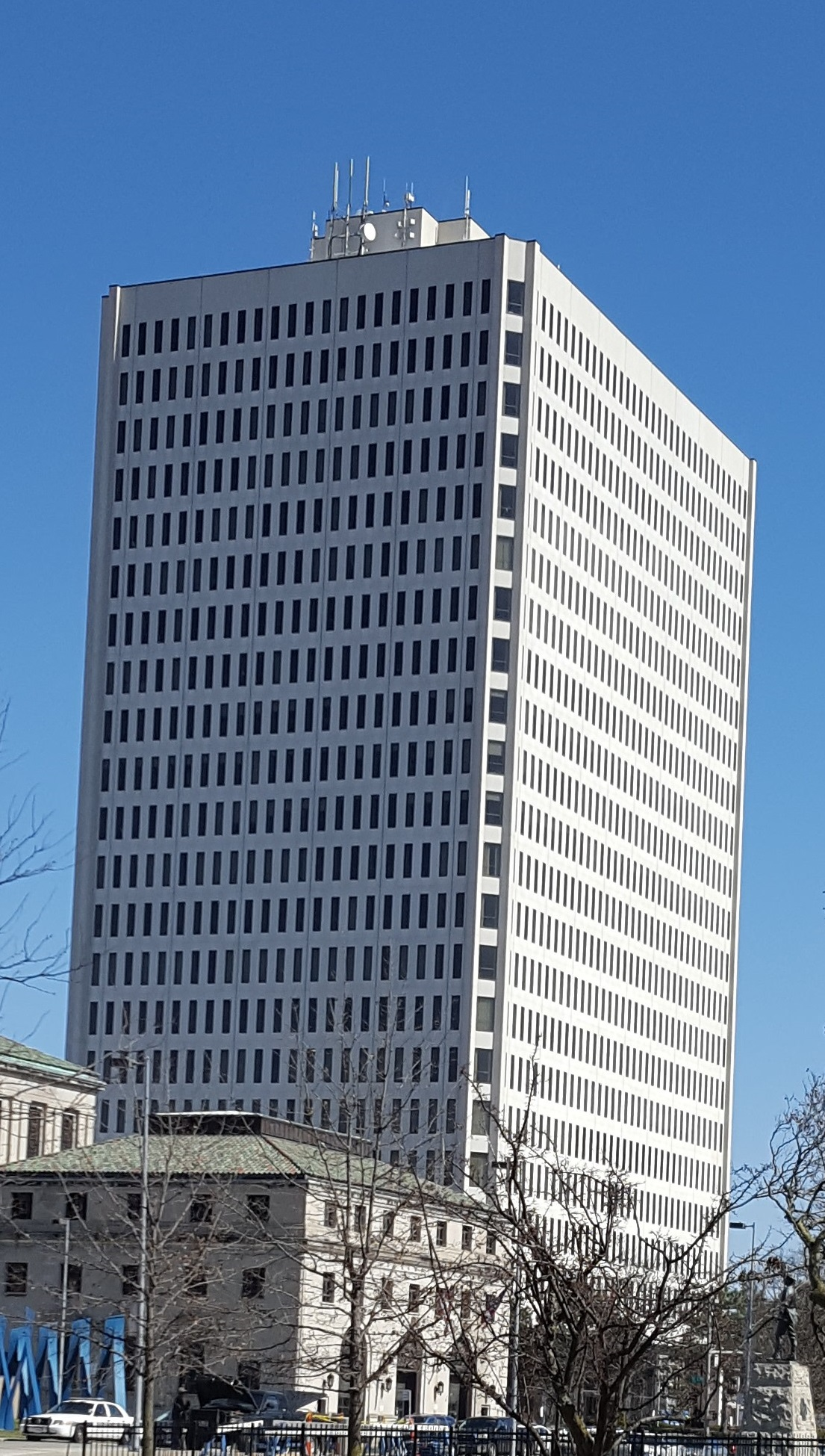
Michael DiSalle Government Center, Toledo, Ohio, 1982

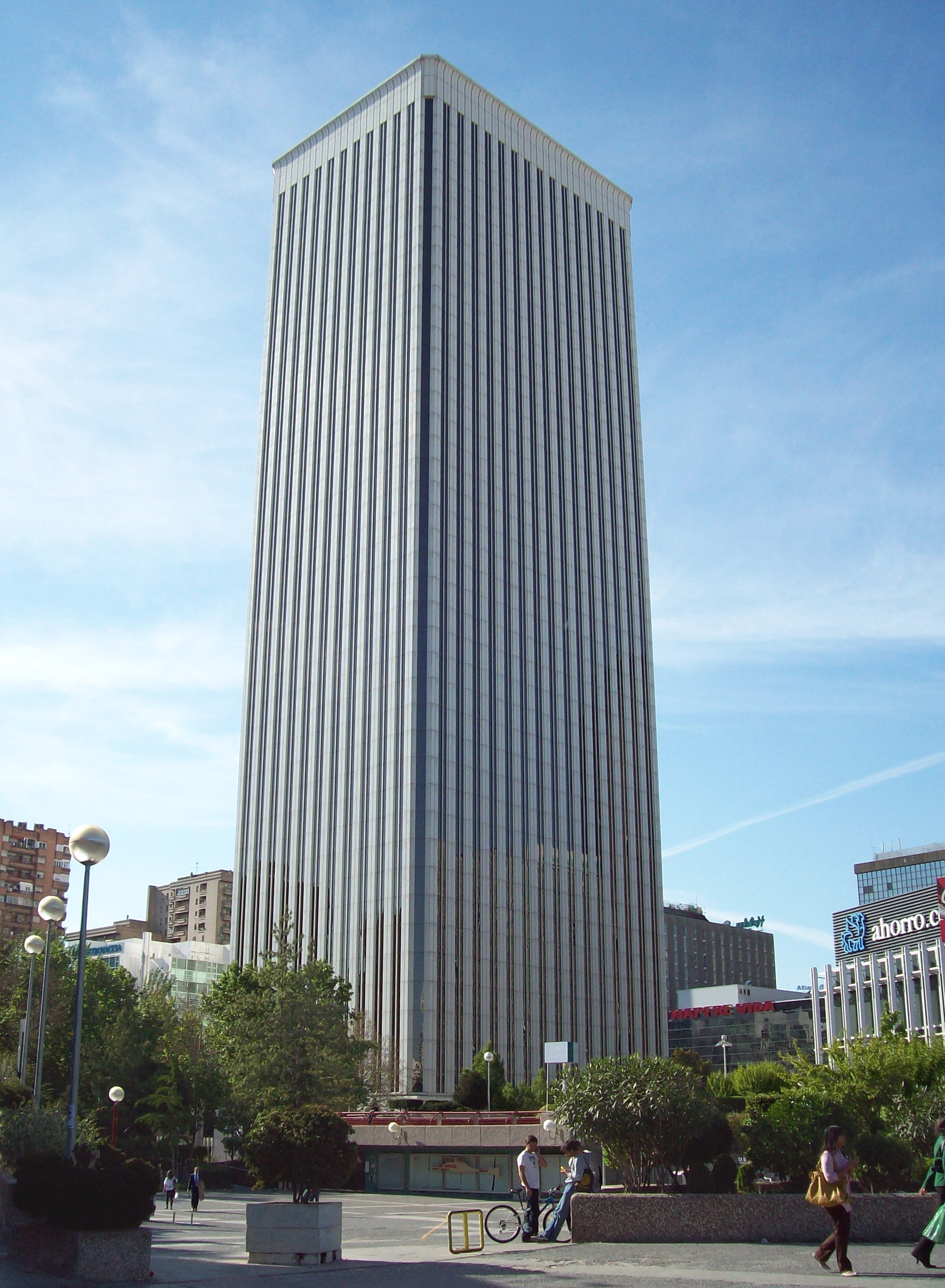
Torre Picasso, Madrid, Spain, 1988

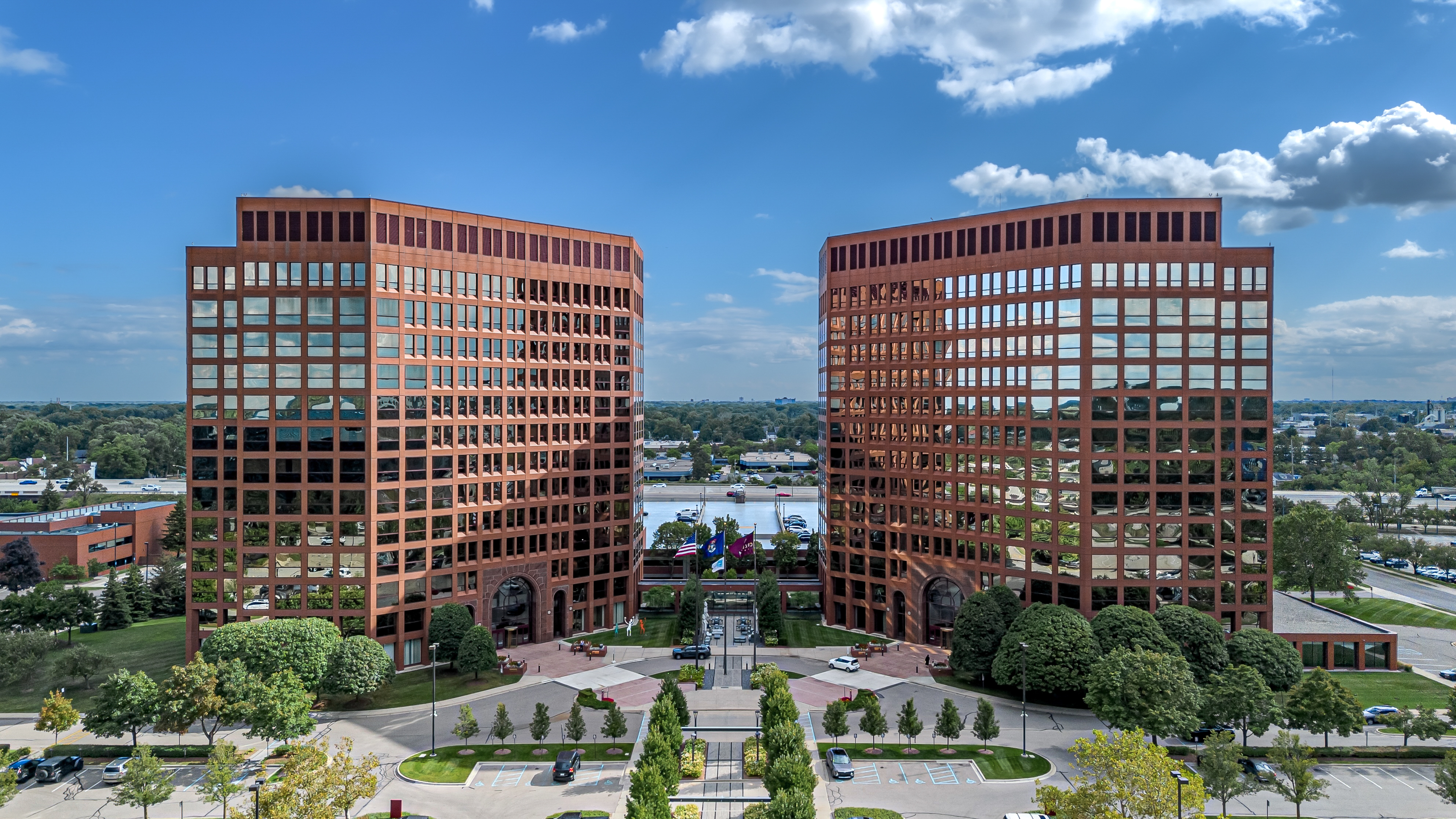
Columbia Center, Troy, Michigan, 1989
