= U.S. Bank Building =

U.S. Bank Building may refer to:

- U.S. Bank Building (Chicago)
- U.S. Bank Building (Sioux Falls)
- U.S. Bank Building (Spokane)

== See also ==
- U.S. Bank Center (disambiguation)
- U.S. Bank Plaza (disambiguation)
- U.S. Bank Tower (disambiguation)
