= U.S. Bank Center =

U.S. Bank Center may refer to:

- U.S. Bank Center (Milwaukee), a skyscraper in downtown Milwaukee, Wisconsin, the tallest building in the state of Wisconsin, and the tallest building between Chicago and Minneapolis
- U.S. Bank Center (Phoenix), a highrise in Phoenix, Arizona
- U.S. Bank Center (Seattle), a high-rise office tower in Seattle, Washington

== See also ==
- U.S. Bank Building (disambiguation)
- U.S. Bank Plaza (disambiguation)
- U.S. Bank Tower (disambiguation)
