= U.S. Bank Tower (disambiguation) =

U.S. Bank Tower may refer to:

- U.S. Bank Tower (Los Angeles), a 1,018-foot (310 m) skyscraper in downtown Los Angeles, California, the third tallest building in California
- U.S. Bank Tower (Sacramento), a 25-story, 404-foot (123 m) building in Sacramento, California
- U.S. Bank Tower (Denver), a 389-foot (119 m) tall high-rise building in Denver, Colorado
- U.S. Bank Tower (Lincoln, Nebraska), a 220 feet (67 m) high-rise building in Lincoln, Nebraska

== See also ==
- U.S. Bank Plaza (disambiguation)
- U.S. Bank Center (disambiguation)
- U.S. Bancorp Tower
