= Quo Vadis Entertainment Center =

Former movie theater in Westland, Michigan, United States

Coordinates: 42°20′28″N 83°23′3″W

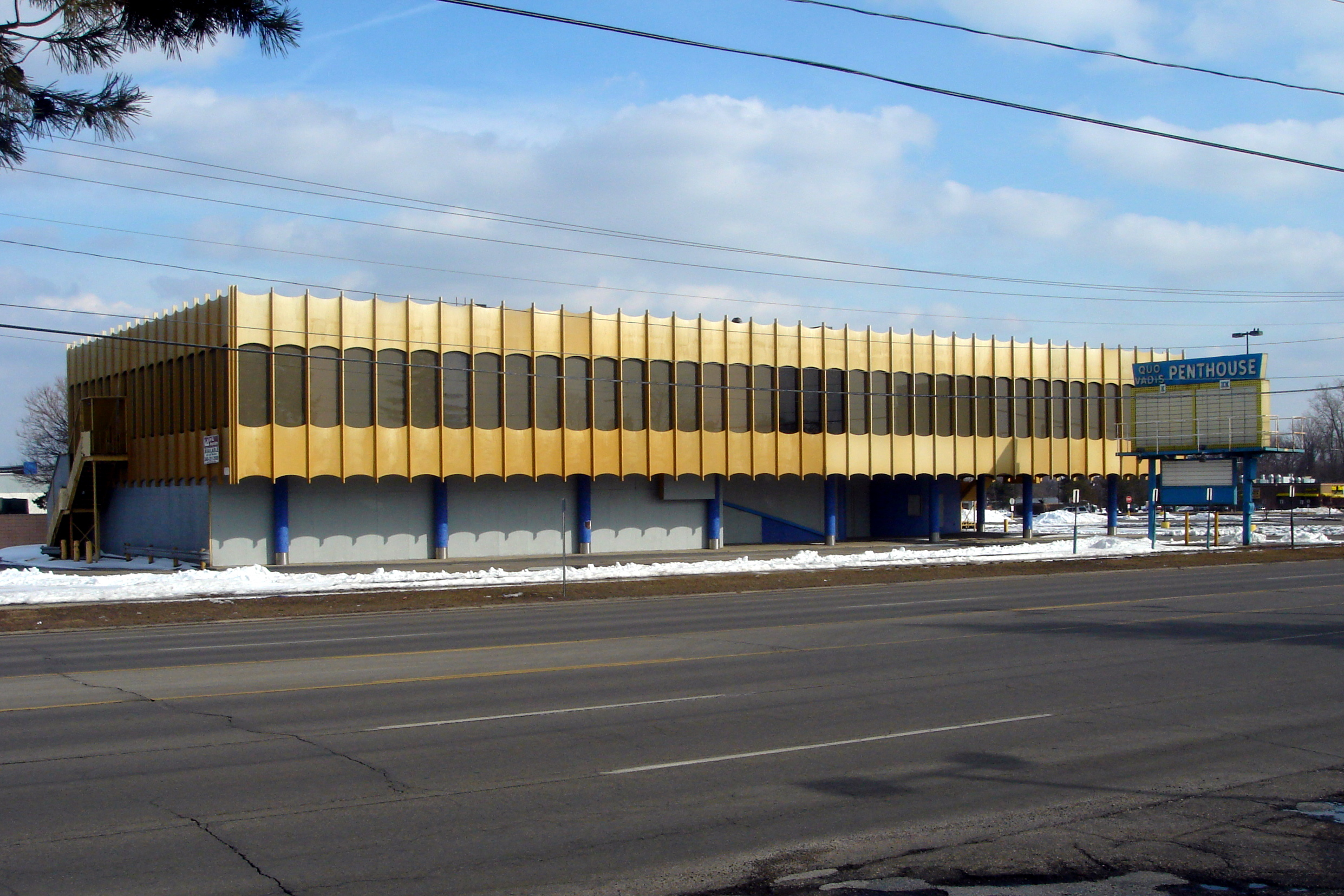
- The theater in 2008
- Interactive map of the Quo Vadis Entertainment Center area
- Alternative names: Penthouse Theater

General information
- Location: Westland, Michigan, 7420 North Wayne Rd
- Opened: 1966
- Closed: 2002
- Demolished: 2011

Design and construction
- Architect: Minoru Yamasaki

The Quo Vadis Entertainment Center (also known as the Quo Vadis or the Penthouse Theater) was a movie theater in Westland, Michigan. Opened in 1966, it closed in 2002 and then remained vacant until it was demolished in 2011. It was noted for its modernist exterior designed by architect Minoru Yamasaki, as well as for being one of the first cinemas to offer cocktail drinks.

== History ==
The Quo Vadis Entertainment Center was the fruit of Martin and Charlie Shafer's hard work and determination to build a movie palace. The structure was designed by Minoru Yamasaki, who had previously completed the designs for the World Trade Center in 1964. The Quo Vadis Entertainment Center opened in 1966. Its exterior is in the Modernist style, while its interior made use of Roman design motifs. The Quo Vadis was regarded as a "movie palace" for its plush environment and cocktail lounge. It was one of the first cinemas to offer cocktail drinks to its patrons and was well known for its "Over 21 Club" cocktail lounge on the second floor. The Quo Vadis also offered patrons of the "Over 21 Club" headphones to watch movies at the adjacent Algiers Drive-In through a "picture window wall". The Algiers Drive-In was demolished in 1985 to make way for a shopping center. The Quo Vadis theater closed in 2002.

National Amusements purchased the property in 1986 and was still the owner as of October 2010. Despite attempts by local groups to preserve the building, demolition began in March 2011 and was completed by June 2011.
