= U.S. Bank Tower (Denver) =

Office skyscraper in Denver, Colorado

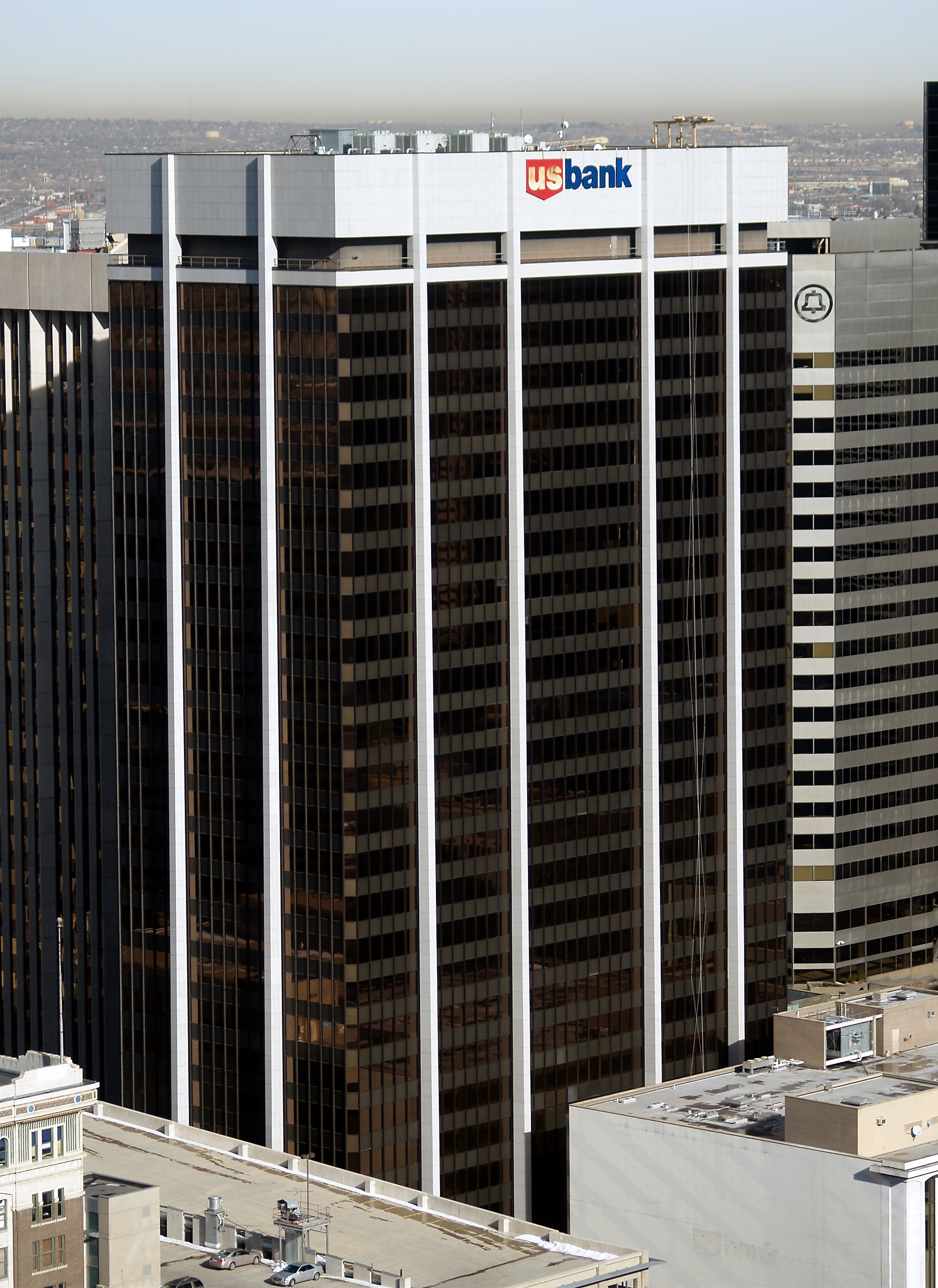
- U.S. Bank Tower, Denver, CO
- Interactive map of the U.S. Bank Tower area

General information
- Status: Completed
- Type: Office
- Location: 950 17th Street, Denver, Colorado
- Coordinates: 39°44′51″N 104°59′38″W
- Completed: 1975

Height
- Roof: 389 ft (119 m)

Technical details
- Floor count: 26

Design and construction
- Architects: Minoru Yamasaki & Associates

The U.S. Bank Tower is a 389 ft (119m) tall office skyscraper in Denver, Colorado. It was completed in 1975 and has 26 floors. Minoru Yamasaki & Associates designed the building and it is currently the 22nd tallest in Denver. Its facade is clad in light colored granite with tinted glass, built in the typical modernist style of its day. The building was formerly clad in white marble, which was replaced with granite due to cladding failure.

== See also ==
- List of tallest buildings in Denver
- List of works by Minoru Yamasaki
