= William James Hall (Harvard University) =

CIA program involving illegal experimentation on human test subjects (1953–1973)

Coordinates: 42.37710°N 71.11345°W

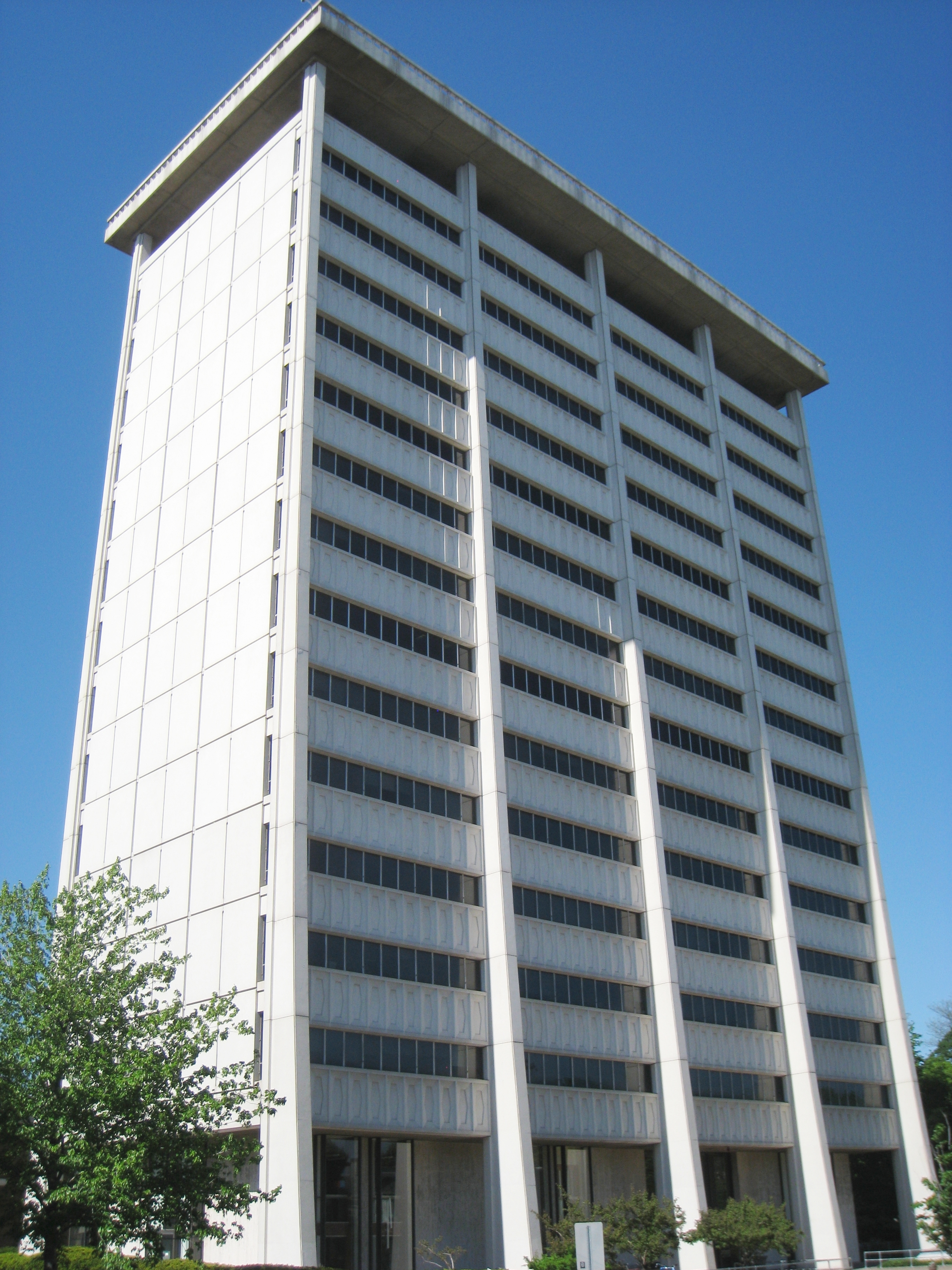
- William James Hall in 2008
- Interactive map of the William James Hall area

General information
- Type: Academic
- Architectural style: New Formalism; Modernism
- Location: 33, Kirkland st. Cambridge, Massachusetts, U.S.
- Completed: 1963
- Cost: 5.8 million (USD, 1961)
- Owner: Harvard University

Built in 1963, William James Hall is a 15-story building on the campus of Harvard University. One of the tallest buildings on Harvard's campus, William James Hall stands at 215 feet tall. The 15-story structure was designed in the New Formalism style which designer Minoru Yamasaki is best known for. Other notable buildings by Yamasaki include Robertson Hall at Princeton University and the former World Trade Center (1973–2001) in New York City. The building is named in honor of William James, who was instrumental in establishing the Harvard Psychology department.

Originally, William James hall was built to house Harvard's growing Department of Social Relations. Randall Hall, built in 1898 was demolished to make way for William James Hall. The department of Social Relations was an interdisciplinary collaboration among three of the social science departments (anthropology, psychology, and sociology). Beginning in 1946 primarily under the supervision of the program's long-time chair and guiding spirit, sociologist Talcott Parsons. The department later became infamous for its unethical human experimentation.

Today, William James Hall houses the Psychology, Sociology, and Social Studies departments.

== History and controversies ==
=== The Department of Social Relations ===
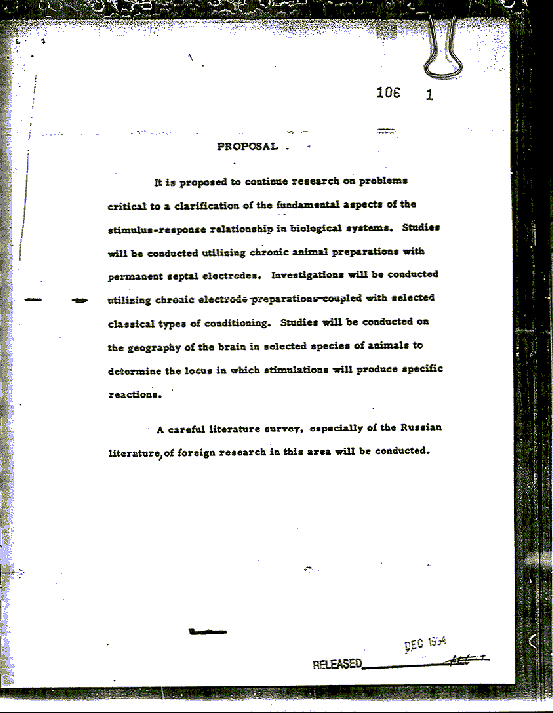
Declassified MKUltra documents

From 1964 to 1986, William James Hall housed Harvard's department of Social Relations. The department was associated with several controversial and unethical experiments during the mid-20th century, including the use of both psychedelic drugs and high levels of stress and distress on students.

Historians have noted possible overlaps between this environment and programs such as Project MKUltra, though the extent of direct involvement by the department remains disputed. In the early 1960s, faculty members Timothy Leary and Richard Alpert conducted experiments involving psychedelic substances with students. The department also operated within a broader Cold War research context in which some scholars maintained connections to U.S. intelligence agencies.

According to Harvard’s Quixotic Pursuit of a New Science, psychologist Henry Murray conducted a series of stress-inducing experiments on undergraduate students that were later criticized for their ethical implications. One participant in these studies was Theodore Kaczynski, though Ted graduated just before the department moved into William James Hall after the building's completion.

=== Jeffrey Epstein ===
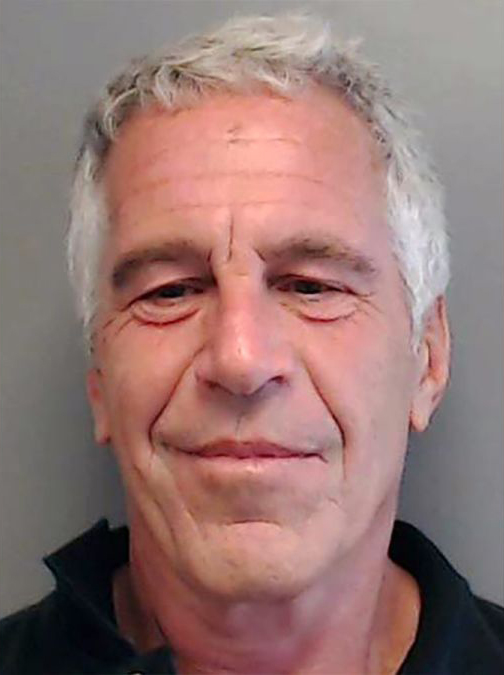
Epstein pictured in 2013, photographed for the sex offender registry

During the 2005-2006 academic year, Jeffrey Epstein was appointment as a Visiting Fellow in the department of psychology. Epstein was entirely unqualified to be a Fellow in the department (a position only open to post-doctoral level researchers). His appointment was approved by then Psychology department chair Stephen Kosslyn, in return for a $200,000 donation to the department. Epstein was allegedly to work under the supervision of Kosslyn and Martin Nowak and also is known to have spent time with psychology professor Steven Pinker.

Epstein was likely granted office space within the William James hall as part of his appointment, but there is no evidence that he actually spent time in the building. When criminal charges against Epstein were dropped in 2006, the university withdrew his upcoming re-appointment as a visiting fellow.

== In popular culture ==
=== Invisible Gorilla Test ===
The best-known study demonstrating inattentional blindness is the Invisible Gorilla Test, conducted by Daniel Simons of the University of Illinois at Urbana–Champaign and Christopher Chabris of Harvard University. This study asked subjects to watch a short video of two groups of people (either wearing black or white T-shirts) passing a basketball around and count the passes made by one of the teams. In different versions of the video a person walks through the scene carrying an umbrella (as discussed above) or wearing a full gorilla suit. Christopher Chabris's famous video (https://www.youtube.com/watch?v=vJG698U2Mvo) was filmed in William James Hall.
