= Columbia Center (Troy) =

Pair of towers in Troy, Michigan, US

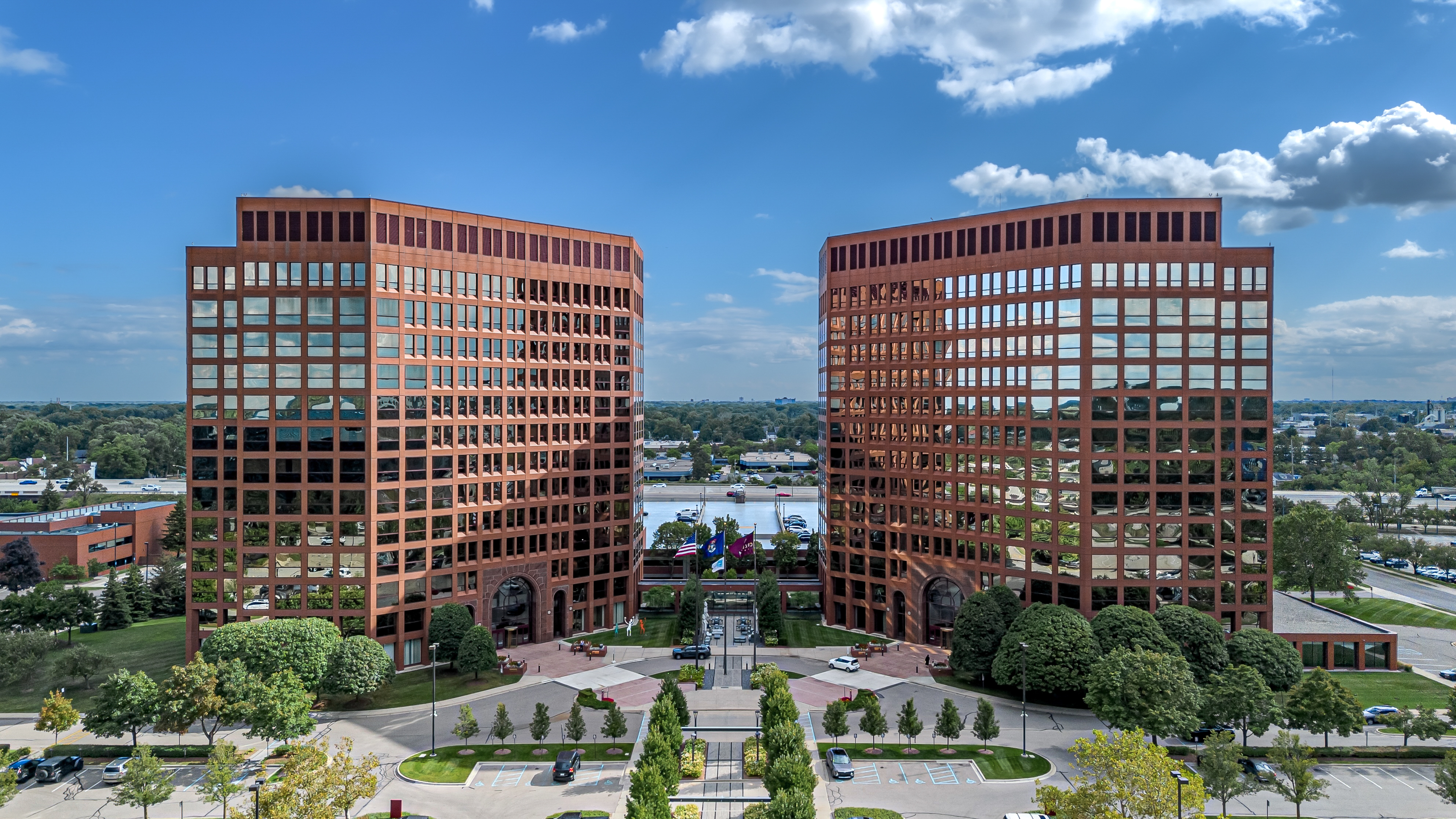
- The Columbia Center in 2025
- Interactive map of the Columbia Center area

General information
- Type: Commercial
- Location: 101 W. Big Beaver Road; Troy, Michigan
- Coordinates: 42.5607°N 83.1504°W
- Completed: 1989 (west tower); 2000 (east tower)

Height
- Height: 193 ft (59 m)

Technical details
- Floor count: 15

Design and construction
- Architect: Minoru Yamasaki & Associates

Website
- columbiacentertroy.com

The Columbia Center is an office complex featuring a pair of twin towers on Big Beaver Road in Troy, Michigan. Both buildings, standing at 14 floors and 193 ft (59m) tall, were designed by Minoru Yamasaki & Associates, designers of One Woodward Avenue and the now-destroyed World Trade Center. The buildings were designed in the modern architectural style, and use mainly brick and glass.

== Layout ==
=== Columbia Center West ===
Columbia Center West is located at 201 W. Big Beaver Road. The building was built in 1989 and stands at 15 floors in height, with 14 above-ground floors, and 1 basement floor. The high-rise is used for offices, restaurants, retail, and includes a fitness center.

=== Columbia Center East ===
Columbia Center East is located at 101 W. Big Beaver Road. The tower was constructed in 1998, and finished in 2000, featuring the same number of floors and basements as its twin. The high-rise is used as offices for a number of local and regional businesses.

=== Other tenants ===
In the 1990s, Northwest Airlines had a ticket office in Suite 115 of the complex. In 2018, a Stoney River Legendary Steaks restaurant open at the complex.

== Troy Traffic Jam ==
The Troy Traffic Jam is an annual auto show that has been held since 2008 and is hosted at the Columbia Center. The show typically includes hundreds of cars on display and occasionally features engineers from the Big Three automobile manufacturers. Hemmings Motor News described the event as "one of the Detroit area’s most diverse and immersive events."
