= U.S. Bank Plaza =

U.S. Bank Plaza may refer to:

- U.S. Bank Plaza (Boise), a high-rise building located in Boise, Idaho, formerly the tallest building in the state
- U.S. Bank Plaza (Minneapolis), a 321-foot (98 m) tall, 23-floor skyscraper
- U.S. Bank Plaza (Sacramento), a 380-foot (120 m) skyscraper in Sacramento, California, completed in 1991

== See also ==
- U.S. Bank Center (disambiguation)
- U.S. Bank Tower (disambiguation)
