= List of tallest buildings in Seattle =

Skyline of Seattle
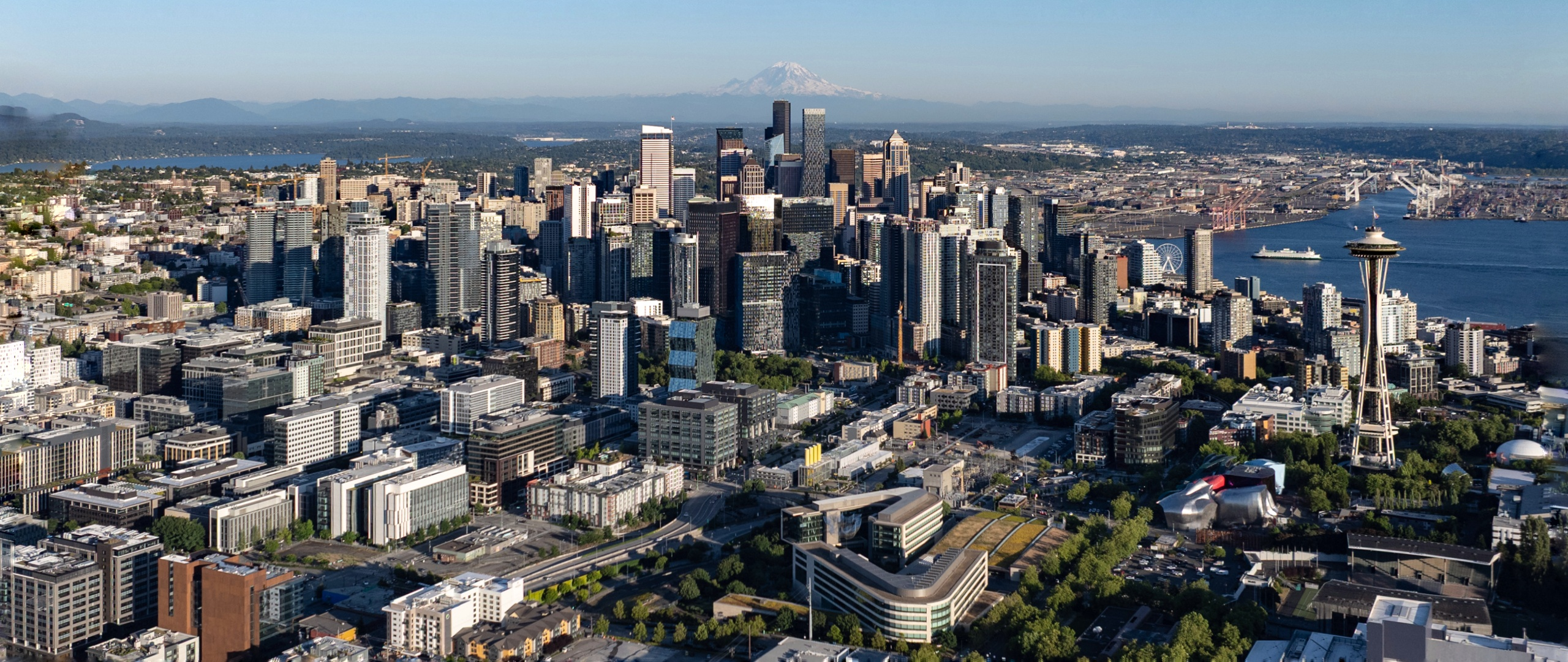
- Seattle's skyline and the Space Needle
- Tallest building: Columbia Center (1985)
- Tallest building height: 937 ft (286 m)

Number of tall buildings (2025)
- Taller than 150 m (492 ft): 22
- Taller than 200 m (656 ft): 5

Number of tall buildings — feet
- Taller than 400 ft (122 m): 54

Seattle is the most populous city in the U.S state of Washington and the Pacific Northwest region of North America, with a metropolitan area population of over 4 million. It is home to 54 completed high-rise buildings over 400 feet (122 meters), of which 21 are over 500 ft (152 m) tall. Seattle's skyline is one of the largest on the West Coast of the United States, and is by far the largest in the Northwestern United States. The tallest building in Seattle is the 76-story Columbia Center, which rises 937 feet (286 m) and was completed in 1985. It is currently the 41st-tallest building in the United States, and the tallest building in the state of Washington.

The history of skyscrapers in Seattle began in the late 19th century, with early construction spurred on by money from the Klondike Gold Rush and the Alaska–Yukon–Pacific Exposition. One noteworthy early skyscraper was the neoclassical Smith Tower, a 38-story, 462 ft (141 m) building completed in 1914. It was the tallest building west of the Mississippi River from its completion until 1931. A building boom in the 1920s was followed by a lull in high-rise development from the 1930s until the late 1950s. Seattle's world's fair, the Century 21 Exposition in 1962, contributed to the revival of the city's downtown. The Space Needle, considered the city's most recognizable landmark, was built for the fair as part of the Seattle Center. A 605 ft (184 m) tall observation tower, it was the tallest structure in the city until 1969, as another construction boom began.

The period between the 1960s and the early 1990s would see the addition of many notable commercial skyscrapers. The rate of development was particularly high during the 1980s, during which the city's third and fourth-tallest buildings, 1201 Third Avenue and Two Union Square, were built. Following another downturn in the 1990s, development resumed with the IDX Tower and WaMu Center in the 2000s. In recent years, Seattle has undergone a significant amount of high-rise development. The neighborhood of Denny Triangle has received an influx of residential towers since Amazon's relocation of their headquarters there in 2012, and the skyline has also expanded northwards to South Lake Union and westwards towards Belltown. Seattle's second tallest building, Rainier Square Tower, was completed in 2021.

The majority of tall buildings in Seattle are located in downtown, with several high-rises extending the skyline towards South Lake Union. There are also a number of towers in the area of First Hill, which is separated from the rest of the downtown skyline by Interstate 5. Additionally, there are a cluster of high-rises in University District to the north, as new residential towers have been built near UW Tower since the late 2010s. The suburban city of Bellevue, east of Seattle across Lake Washington, has a skyline of its own.

== History ==
=== Early high-rises ===
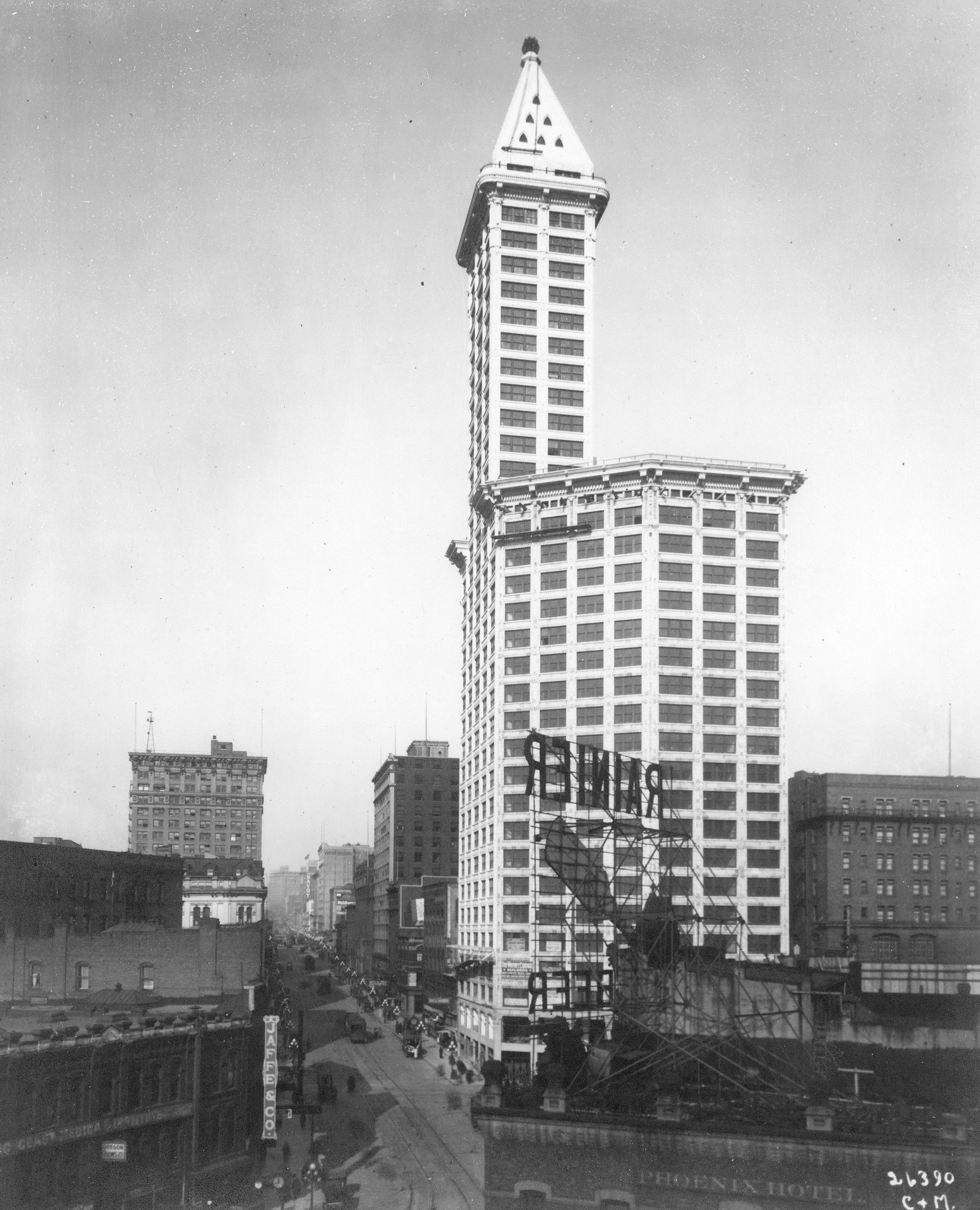
Photograph of the Smith Tower in 1914, the year it was completed

After the Great Seattle Fire of June 6, 1889, Seattle began reconstruction of the city's central business district under a new building code requiring the use of fireproof materials, such as stone and brick. By the end of 1890, 465 buildings had been built, completing the initial phase of reconstruction, and city boosters looked to build modern high-rise buildings after the infusion of new money from the Klondike Gold Rush later that decade. The Pioneer Building, whose observation tower surpassed 110 feet (34 m), was completed in 1892 and is regarded as the city's first modern high-rise building. The Alaska Building, completed in 1904 and rising 203 feet (62 m) above 2nd Avenue in Pioneer Square, is considered to be Seattle's first skyscraper and first steel-framed high-rise building. It held the title of tallest habitable building in the city until the completion of the 205-foot (62 m), 18-story Hoge Building in 1911. Both buildings had been surpassed in height by the clocktower of King Street Station, opened in 1906, which stands 245 feet (75 m) tall.

Seattle's continued growth at the turn of the century, bolstered by the Alaska–Yukon–Pacific Exposition in 1909 and the opening of the Metropolitan Tract to development, led to a building boom north of Yesler Way in the modern-day downtown. On July 4, 1914, firearm and typewriter magnate Lyman Cornelius Smith opened the 484-foot-tall (148 m) Smith Tower, the city's new tallest building. For several years, the 38-story tower would hold the title of tallest west of the Mississippi River, and dominate the Seattle skyline. By the end of the 1920s building boom, several new Art Deco high-rises above 200 feet (61 m) were completed in Seattle, including the Medical Dental Building (1925), Seattle Tower (1930), Roosevelt Hotel (1929), Washington Athletic Club (1930), Textile Tower Building (1930), Harborview Medical Center (1931), and Pacific Tower (1933).

=== Post-war ===
New high-rise construction in Seattle was halted during the Great Depression and World War II, and slowed during the post-war economic boom in the 1950s, as suburbanization took hold in the region. The first new building in downtown to be built after the war was the Norton Building in 1959, a 19-story office building in the International Style with a glass curtain wall and simple exterior features, a departure from the previous Neo-Gothic and Art Deco styles used in high-rises. By 1959, office space occupying downtown buildings had overtaken retail uses, with over 4,987,000 square feet (463,300 m^{2}). Seattle was selected to host the World's Fair in 1962, revitalizing the downtown area and bringing the construction of the fairgrounds' centerpiece, the Space Needle. The 605-foot (184 m) observation tower became the symbol of the fair and a landmark for Seattle, and was the first new structure to surpass the Smith Tower in height.

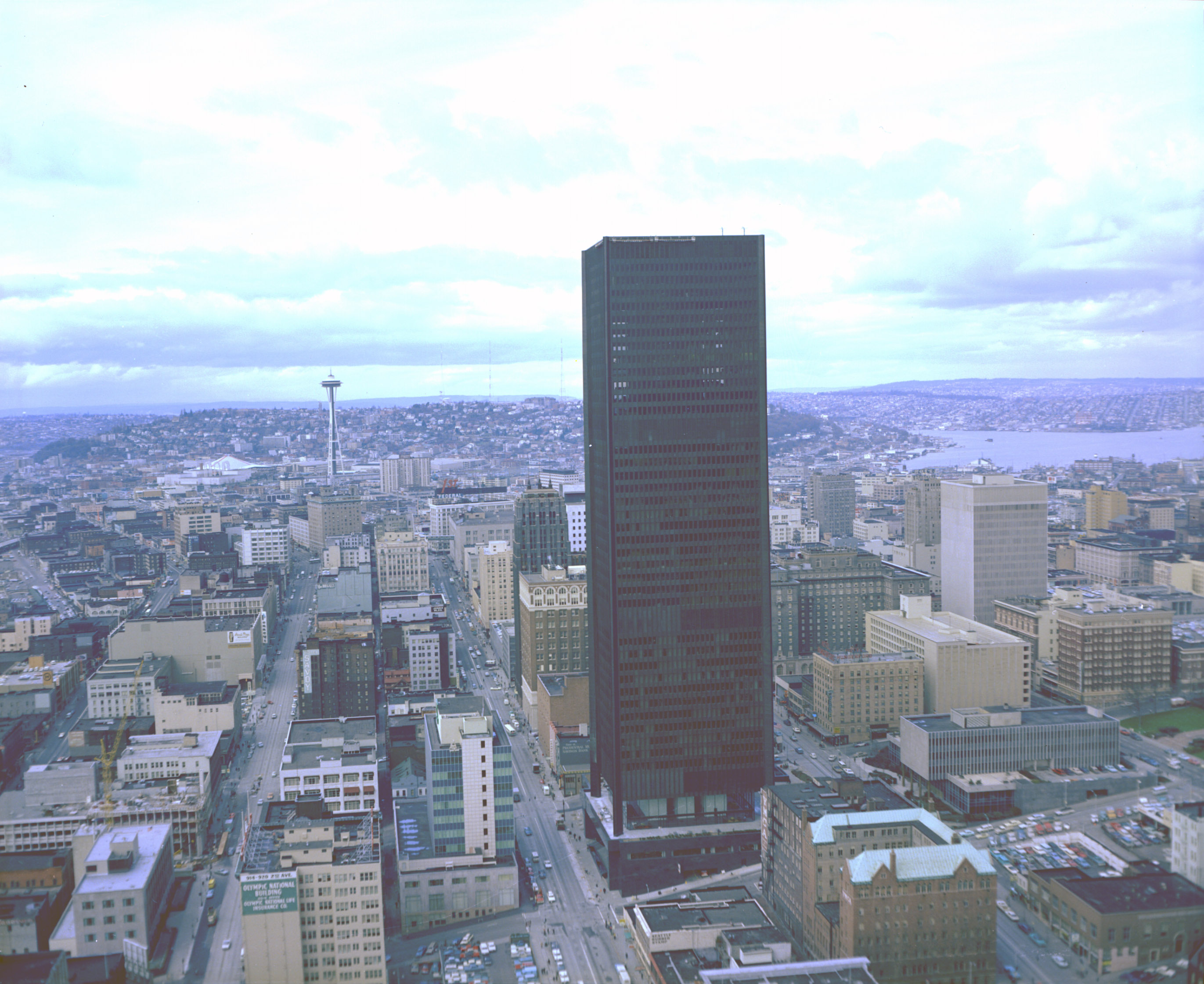
An aerial view of Downtown Seattle looking north in 1969, after the completion of the 50-story Seafirst Building

The 50-story Seafirst Building (now Safeco Plaza) became the city's tallest when it opened in 1969, standing 630 feet (190 m), and signaled the start of a major construction boom in Downtown Seattle. The boom would last well into the 1980s, despite an economic downturn caused by the Boeing bust and 1970s energy crisis, and introduce elements of Modernist and Postmodern architecture to high-rise construction in the city. During this period, 15 skyscrapers taller than 400 feet (122 m) in height were constructed in Seattle, including 901 Fifth Avenue (1973), the Henry M. Jackson Federal Building (1974), 1600 Seventh Avenue (1976), Rainier Tower (1977), 1111 Third Avenue (1980), the Westin Building (1981), 800 Fifth Avenue (1981), Union Square (1981 and 1989), and the First Interstate Center (1983). In total, more than 14 million square feet (1,300,000 m^{2}) of office space was added by new construction in the 1980s. In 1984, the 76-story, 943-foot (287 m) Columbia Center was completed, becoming the tallest building in Seattle and on the West Coast of the United States. During the 1980s, the suburb of Bellevue emerged as an urban center, boasting a skyline of its own that would continue to grow well into the 21st century.

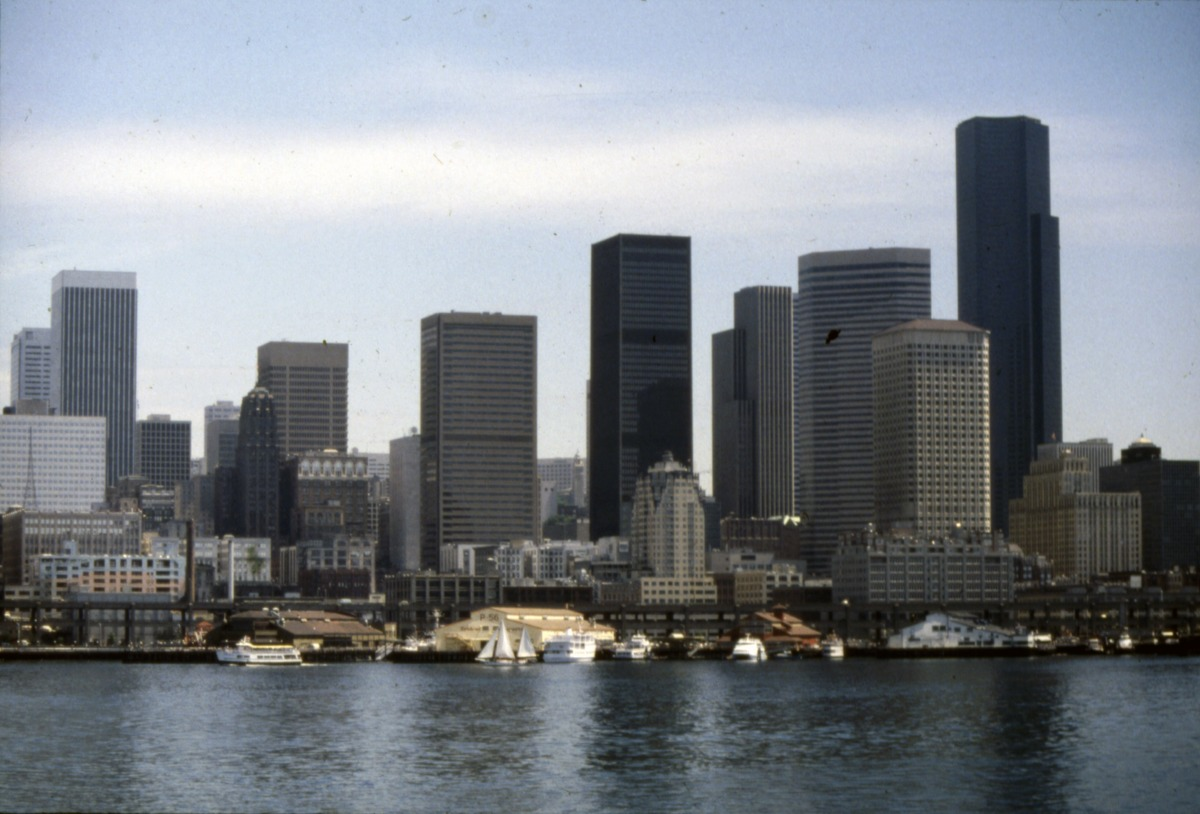
The Downtown Seattle skyline in 1986, viewed from Elliott Bay

The boom of the 1980s was capped by the Columbia Center and other downtown towers such as 1000 Second Avenue (1987), 1201 Third Avenue (1988), the Pacific First Centre (1989) and the Gateway Tower (1990), with new downtown office space in the decade surpassing what had been built over the previous 100 years in Seattle. The new wave of development sparked fears of "Manhattanization" in downtown that would push out lower-income residents and reduce quality of life. A downtown land use plan adopted in 1984 and shelved until 1986 required the addition of public benefits for major construction projects. Opposition to the new downtown plan, which would allow "generous" new construction unhindered by a height limit, led to the creation of the "Citizen's Alternative Plan", which would limit buildings to 450 feet (140 m) and restrict development to an annual limit of 1 million square feet (93,000 m^{2}) of space per year. The plan was approved by voters as a ballot initiative on May 16, 1989, replacing the land use plan and introduced the city's modern design review process for new development.

=== 1990s and 2000s ===
Development of new high-rises slowed down across U.S. cities during the early 1990s recession as demand caught up to an over-built market, with Seattle's 1980s office buildings suffering from a lack of tenants that forced ownership changes or the threat of bankruptcy and foreclosure. By 1992, vacancy rates for office space in Downtown Seattle reached 14.7 percent, while vacancy rates in outlying suburbs remained much lower. The dot-com bubble of the late 1990s, including a local economy boosted by Boeing and Microsoft, led a cut of the vacancy rate to 6 percent by 1997; between 1997 and 1999, new office buildings created an average of 1.5 million square feet (140,000 m^{2}) of additional office space per year. After the burst of the dot-com bubble and the early 2000s recession, downtown office vacancies shot up from 1 percent to 13 percent by the end of 2001.

Two major downtown projects, the IDX Tower (2003) and WaMu Center (2006), were completed during the early 2000s and were the first office buildings to be built since the Key Tower in 1990. By the mid-2000s, office vacancies in Downtown Seattle improved to below 10 percent, but office developers were hesitant to break ground on new projects. A new downtown zoning plan adopted in 2006 effectively repealed the 1989 Citizens' Alternative Plan and its modified 540-foot (160 m) height limit, favoring unlimited heights in downtown and 400-foot (120 m) residential towers on the periphery of downtown. The new zoning plan set off a wave of high-rise residential development in the late 2000s, including the completion of Fifteen Twenty-One Second Avenue (2008), Escala (2009), and Olive 8 (2009), coming at the peak of the United States housing bubble and the demand for downtown luxury condominiums before the Great Recession.

=== Post-recession boom ===
During the Great Recession, downtown office vacancies rose to a record 21 percent by the beginning of 2010, but dropped to 10 percent by 2013; the downturn was partially blamed on the collapse of Washington Mutual, which employed 3,500 in its downtown offices. The surge in demand for office space revived several downtown high-rise office projects, including The Mark and Madison Centre, both exceeding 500 feet (150 m) in height and completed in 2017. Other office and mixed-use buildings in Downtown Seattle include 2&U and the Rainier Square Tower, which became the city's second-tallest building at 850 feet (260 m). Since 2010, developers have also sought to build high-rise residential towers in Downtown Seattle; unfinished proposals include the stalled Civic Square project and a supertall 101-story tower named 4/C, which would become the city's tallest building at 1,029 feet (314 m). Another proposed supertall, the 888 Tower, was later scaled back in height.

Recent high-rise development in Seattle has been concentrated in the Denny Triangle and South Lake Union areas to the north of Downtown Seattle, both rezoned to support development in the 2000s after decades of supporting industrial and low-rise commercial establishments. Office development came first to the Denny Triangle area in the mid-2000s, with the construction of the United States Courthouse (2004) and 1918 Eighth Avenue (2009). In 2012, Amazon.com announced their intention to relocate their South Lake Union headquarters to a complex of high-rises in Denny Triangle; the first towers, the 520-foot (160 m) Doppler and Day 1, opened in 2016, and at least three more towers are in development. The Denny Triangle also hosts the region's largest hotel, the 45-story Hyatt Regency Seattle near the Washington State Convention Center, which was completed in 2018.

Residential developments in the Denny Triangle area above 400 feet (120 m) include Aspira (2010), Premiere on Pine, Cirrus, Kinects, Stratus, McKenzie Apartments, and AMLI Arc. The Denny Way corridor in South Lake Union, upzoned in 2013 by the city council, has at least seven high-rise residential buildings above 400 feet (120 m) in height, including the completed Kiara and 1120 Denny Way. Other parts of downtown Seattle have also been host to recent high-rise residential development, including the twin Insignia Towers in Belltown, Tower 12, Helios, and West Edge Tower near Pike Place Market.

== Cityscape ==
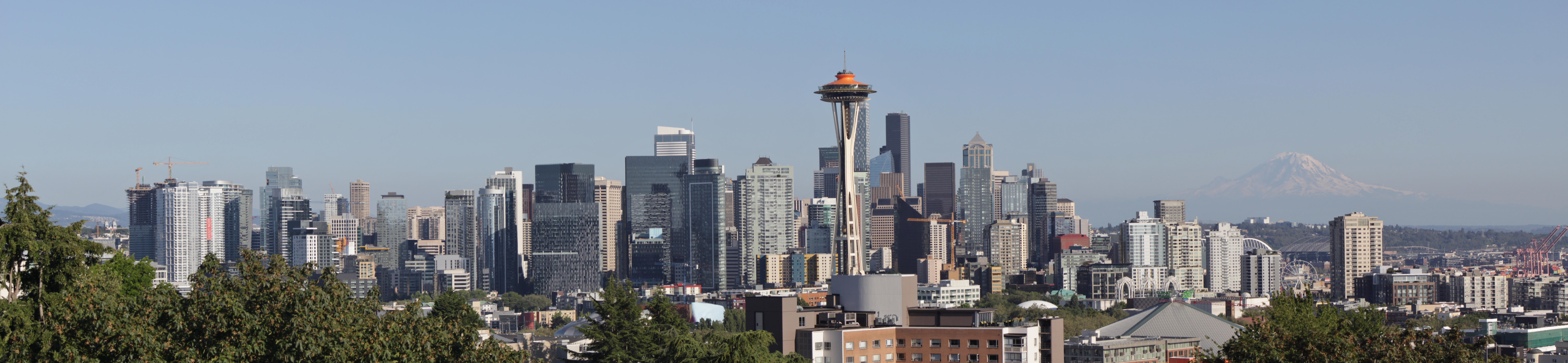
Seattle from Kerry Park in 2022, with Mount Rainier in the background to the right (Hover over image to identify buildings or click to visit the corresponding article)

== Tallest buildings ==
This list ranks Seattle skyscrapers that stand at least 400 feet (122 m) tall, based on standard height measurement. This includes spires and architectural details but does not include antenna masts. The "Year" column indicates the year in which a building was completed. Freestanding observation towers, while not habitable buildings, are included for comparison purposes; however, they are not ranked.

Was the tallest building in Seattle upon completion

Rank	Name	Image	Coordinates	Height ft (m)	Floors	Year	Purpose	Notes
1	Columbia Center		47°36′16.31″N 122°19′50.48″W	937 (286)	76	1984	Office	41st-tallest in the United States; Tallest building in Seattle and the state of Washington since 1985; Tallest building on the West Coast when completed, now the fourth-tallest; More floors than any other building west of the Mississippi River; Formerly known as Bank of America Tower; Originally designed to be 1,005 feet (306 m) tall, but the height was reduced due to concerns of a nearby flight path by the Federal Aviation Administration
2	Rainier Square Tower		47°36′33.12″N 122°20′05.89″W	847 (258)	58	2020	Mixed-use	64th-tallest in the United States; Mixed-use office and residential building
3	1201 Third Avenue		47°36′25.92″N 122°20′09.96″W	772 (235)	55	1988	Office	98th-tallest in the United States
4	Two Union Square		47°36′37.38″N 122°19′55.33″W	740 (230)	56	1989	Office	129th-tallest building in the United States
5	Seattle Municipal Tower		47°36′18.36″N 122°19′47.28″W	722 (220)	57	1990	Office	151st-tallest building in the United States; Tallest building constructed in Seattle in the 1990s
6	F5 Tower		47°36′19.00″N 122°19′52.00″W	646 (197)	41	2017	Mixed-use	Tallest building constructed in Seattle in the 2010s; Mixed-use office and hotel building
7	Safeco Plaza		47°36′21.96″N 122°20′02.76″W	630 (190)	50	1969	Office	Tallest building constructed in Seattle in the 1960s; Tallest building in Seattle from 1969 to 1985; Originally called the Seattle-First National Bank Building
8	U.S. Bank Center		47°36′38.16″N 122°20′04.20″W	606 (185)	44	1989	Office	Formerly known as the Pacific First Centre. Also known as City Center
—	Space Needle^{[C]}		47°37′13.44″N 122°20′56.76″W	605 (184)	5	1962	Observation	Tallest observation tower in Washington; 4th tallest observation tower in the United States
9	JPMorganChase Center		47°36′26.32″N 122°20′13.59″W	598 (182)	42	2006	Office	Tallest building constructed in Seattle in the 2000s; Previously named the Russell Investments Center and WaMu Center
10	Docusign Tower		47°36′18.00″N 122°20′02.76″W	574 (175)	47	1983	Office	Previously named First Interstate Center and Wells Fargo Center
11	Madison Centre		47°36′23.29″N 122°19′52.61″W	560 (170)	36	2017	Office	
12	800 Fifth Avenue		47°36′20.88″N 122°19′48.72″W	543 (166)	42	1981	Office	Formerly known as Bank of America Fifth Avenue Plaza from 1981 to 2014.
13	901 Fifth Avenue		47°36′20.99″N 122°19′55.20″W	536 (163)	41	1973	Office	Tallest building constructed in Seattle in the 1970s
14	Qualtrics Tower		47°36′24.50″N 122°20′13.63″W	527 (161)	36	2019	Office	Formerly known as 2+U and 2&U
15	Doppler		47°36′54.52″N 122°20′18.88″W	524 (160)	37	2016	Office	Also known as Amazon Tower I
16	Day 1		47°36′57.13″N 122°20′23.46″W	521 (159)	37	2017	Office	Also known as Amazon Tower II
17	Hyatt Regency Seattle		47°36′54.00″N 122°20′04.92″W	520 (160)	45	2018	Hotel	Tallest hotel; Largest hotel in the Pacific Northwest
17	re:Invent		47°36′59″N 122°20′20″W	520 (160)	37	2019	Office	Also known as Amazon Tower III
19	Rainier Tower		47°36′32.47″N 122°20′02.58″W	514 (157)	31	1977	Office	
20	Fourth and Madison Building		47°36′19.79″N 122°19′58.91″W	512 (156)	40	2003	Office	
21	1918 Eighth Avenue		47°36′56.52″N 122°20′09.96″W	500 (150)	37	2009	Office	
22	1000 Second Avenue		47°36′16.92″N 122°20′07.80″W	493 (150)	40	1986	Office	
23	Henry M. Jackson Federal Building		47°36′15.84″N 122°20′07.44″W	487 (148)	37	1974	Office	
24	1600 Seventh Avenue		47°36′47.52″N 122°20′03.84″W	484 (148)	33	1976	Office	Formerly known as Pacific Northwest Bell Building,1600 Bell Plaza, Bell Plaza, and Qwest Plaza
24	The Ayer	–	47°37′02″N 122°20′06″W	484 (148)	46	2023	Residential	
24	First Light	—	47°36′46.15″N 122°20′27.65″W	484 (148)	48	2026	Residential	
27	The Ivey on Boren	–	47°37′05″N 122°20′07″W	475 (145)	44	2022	Residential	
28	Smith Tower		47°36′07.53″N 122°19′54.49″W	462 (141)	38	1914	Mixed-use	Tallest building constructed in Seattle in the 1910s; Tallest building west of the Mississippi River until completion of the Kansas City Power & Light Building in 1931; Tallest building in Seattle from 1914 to 1969; Mixed-use office and residential building
29	One Union Square		47°36′34.89″N 122°19′55.52″W	456 (139)	36	1981	Office	
30	Olive 8		47°36′48.96″N 122°20′02.76″W	455 (139)	39	2009	Mixed-use	Mixed-use hotel and residential building
31	1111 Third Avenue		47°36′24.00″N 122°20′06.00″W	454 (138)	34	1980	Office	
32	Westin Seattle North Tower		47°36′49.50″N 122°20′19.52″W	449 (137)	47	1982	Hotel	
33	Premiere on Pine		47°36′47.53″N 122°19′55.91″W	444 (135)	39	2015	Residential	
34	AMLI Arc		47°36′59.55″N 122°19′53.28″W	442 (135)	37	2017	Mixed-use	Mixed-use office and residential building
34	Nexus		47°37′01.90″N 122°19′50.10″W	442 (135)	41	2020	Residential	
36	Fifteen Twenty-One Second Avenue		47°36′33.48″N 122°20′22.20″W	440 (130)	38	2008	Residential	
36	Cirrus		47°36′59.46″N 122°20′14.64″W	440 (130)	41	2015	Residential	
36	Kiara		47°37′08.85″N 122°20′15.38″W	440 (130)	40	2018	Residential	
36	Stratus		47°37′01.55″N 122°20′15.22″W	440 (130)	41	2018	Residential	Contains retail units on lower floors
36	West Edge Tower		47°36′32.82″N 122°20′18.04″W	440 (130)	39	2018	Residential	Contains retail units on lower floors
36	Arrivé		47°36′51.91″N 122°20′30.24″W	440 (130)	41	2019	Mixed-use	Mixed-use hotel and residential building
36	Modern		47°36′46.1″N 122°20′31.6″W	440 (130)	36	2020	Mixed-use	Mixed-use office and residential building; Formerly known as 3rd & Lenora
36	Spire		47°37′06.12″N 122°20′40.35″W	440 (130)	41	2021	Residential	
36	Ren		47°36′11.63″N 122°19′49.01″W	440 (130)	41	2022	Residential	
36	Insignia South Tower		47°36′59.50″N 122°20′35.53″W	440 (130)	41	2015	Residential	
36	Insignia North Tower		47°37′01.29″N 122°20′37.36″W	440 (130)	41	2016	Residential	
36	Helios		47°36′38.38″N 122°20′22.95″W	440 (130)	40	2017	Residential	Also known as 2nd and Pine
36	Kinects		47°37′01.39″N 122°19′53.44″W	440 (130)	40	2017	Residential	
49	The Emerald		47°36′37.57″N 122°20′25.75″W	439 (134)	40	2020	Residential	
50	McKenzie Apartments		47°37′03.68″N 122°20′21.50″W	434 (132)	41	2018	Residential	
51	OSLU North Tower		47°37′7.1″N 122°20′7.2″W	426 (130)	43	2022	Residential	
52	OSLU South Tower		47°37′7.1″N 122°20′7.2″W	414 (126)	43	2022	Residential	
53	Westin Building		47°36′51.48″N 122°20′18.60″W	409 (125)	34	1981	Office	
54	Aspira		47°36′57.77″N 122°20′00.50″W	407 (124)	37	2010	Residential	

== Tallest under construction ==
There are ten skyscrapers that are under construction in Seattle that are expected to rise over 400 feet (122 m), but are not yet completed structures.

Name	Coordinates	Estimated height ft (m)	Estimated floors	Began construction	Estimated year of completion (est.)	Purpose	Notes
3rd & Cherry	47°36′12.24″N 122°19′52.32″W	629 (192)	57	2022	On hold	Residential	Developed by Bosa; Construction paused since July 2022
121 Boren Avenue	47°37′10.17″N 122°20′10.40″W	624 (190)	48	2025	2027	Residential	Proposed by Onni Group
Aero1200 East Tower	47°37′05.80″N 122°19′54.16″W	484 (148)	48	2018	2027	Residential	Developed by OPTrust; Formerly developed by Westbank Projects
Aero1200 West Tower	47°37′05.76″N 122°19′56.53″W	484 (148)	48	2018	2027	Residential	Developed by OPTrust; Formerly developed by Westbank Projects
Sloane	47°37′05″N 122°20′36″W	494 (151)	45	2024	2027	Residential	Developed by Holland Partner Group; Former site of Elephant Car Wash
Block V North Tower	47°37′03.2″N 122°20′32.2″W	476 (145)	42	2019	On hold	Residential	Proposed by Clise Properties on Antioch University campus; Clise Properties sold the site to Onni Group.
Block V South Tower	47°37′03.2″N 122°20′32.2″W	476 (145)	42	2019	On hold	Residential	Proposed by Clise Properties on Antioch University campus; Clise Properties sold the site to Onni Group.
Seattle House Tower 1	47°37′01.8″N 122°20′31.6″W	440 (134)	45	2019	2026	Residential	Developed by HB Management and Concord Pacific
Seattle House Tower 2	47°37′01.8″N 122°20′31.6″W	440 (134)	45	2019	2026	Residential	Developed by HB Management and Concord Pacific

== Timeline of tallest buildings ==
This lists buildings that once held the title of tallest building in Seattle. The Space Needle is not a building, and is thus not included in this list; the 605-foot (184 m) tower was the tallest structure in the city from 1961 to 1969.

Name	Image	Street address	Years as tallest	Height ft (m)	Floors	Reference
Pioneer Building		612 1st Avenue	1892–1904 (12 years)	110 (34)^{[D]}	6	
Alaska Building		618 2nd Avenue	1904–1906 (2 years)	203 (62)	14	
King Street Station Tower		303 South Jackson Street	1906–1914 (8 years)	245 (75)	8	
Smith Tower		506 2nd Avenue	1914–1969 (55 years)	489 (149)	38	
Safeco Plaza		1001 4th Avenue	1969–1985 (16 years)	630 (192)	50	
Columbia Center		701 5th Avenue	1985–present	937 (286)	76	

== Notes ==
C. The Space Needle is not a habitable building, but is included in this list for comparative purposes. Per a ruling by the Council on Tall Buildings and Urban Habitat, freestanding observation towers are not considered to be buildings, as they are not fully habitable structures.
D. The height of the Pioneer Building was reduced to 92 feet (28 m) after the 1949 Olympia earthquake.
