= Aspira =

Aspira may refer to:

- ASPIRA Association - an American educational organization.
- Aspira (building) - a building in Seattle, Washington.
