= West Edge Tower =

440-foot-tall residential skyscraper in Seattle, Washington

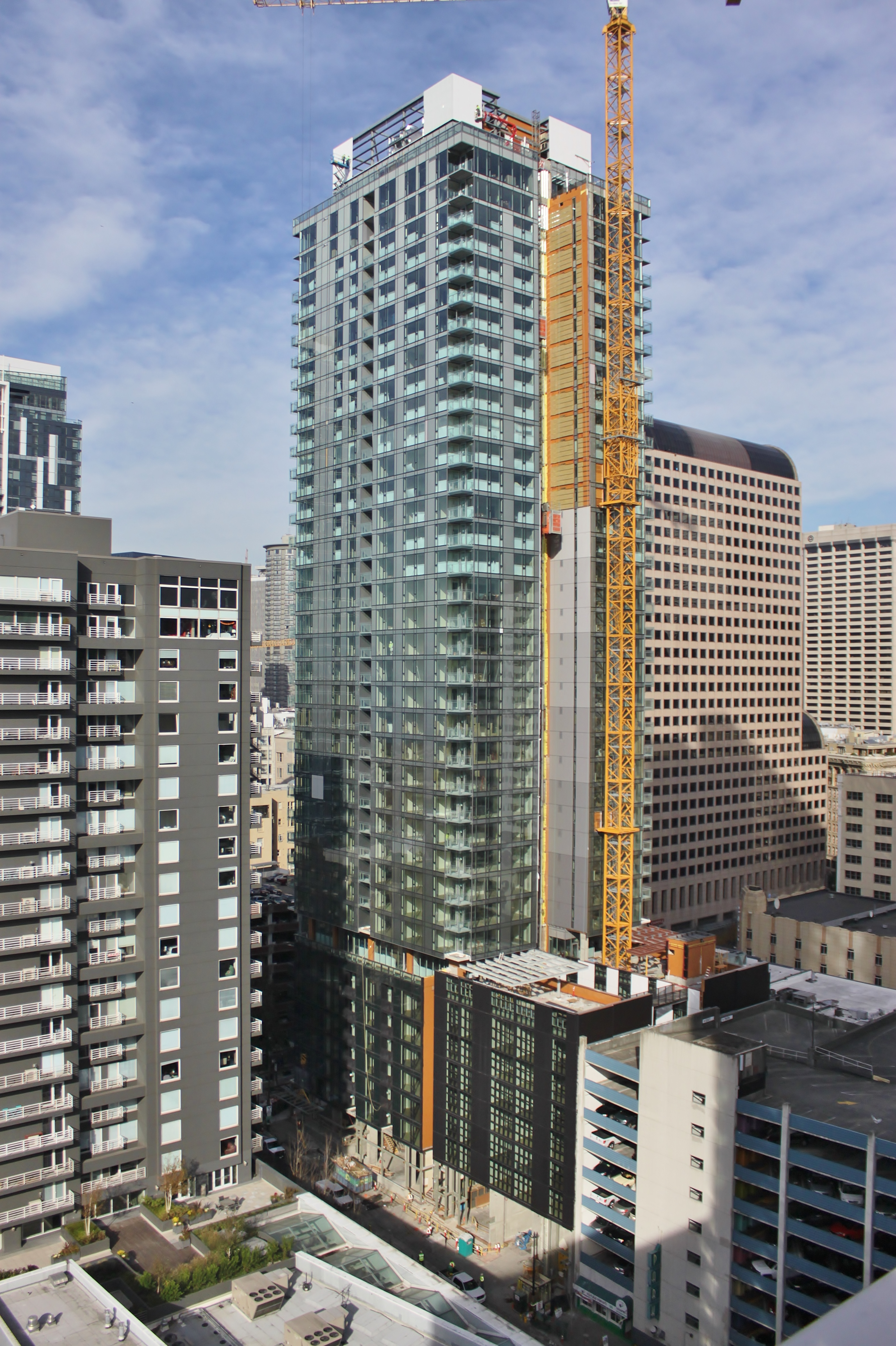
- Tower under construction in October 2017, as seen from the Russell Investments Center

- Location within downtown Seattle
- Former names: Candela Hotel & Residences
- Alternative names: 2nd & Pike

General information
- Status: Completed
- Location: 1430 2nd Avenue; Seattle, Washington
- Coordinates: 47°36′33.00″N 122°20′19.00″W
- Construction started: July 23, 2015
- Topped-out: August 2017
- Opened: 2018

Height
- Height: 440 ft (130 m)

Technical details
- Floor count: 39
- Floor area: 567,403 sq ft (52,713.5 m^{2})
- Grounds: 19,069 sq ft (1,771.6 m^{2})

Design and construction
- Architect: Tom Kundig
- Architecture firm: Olson Kundig Architects
- Developer: Urban Visions
- Structural engineer: Magnusson Klemencic Associates
- Services engineer: MacDonald-Miller Facility Solutions
- Other designers: Ankrom Moisan Architects
- Main contractor: Sellen Construction

Other information
- Number of units: 339 apartments
- Parking: 244 spaces in underground garage

2nd & Pike, also known as the West Edge Tower, is a 440-foot-tall (130 m) residential skyscraper in Seattle, Washington. The 39-story tower, developed by Urban Visions and designed by Tom Kundig of Olson Kundig Architects, has 339 luxury apartments and several ground-level retail spaces. The 8th floor includes a Medical One primary care clinic.

The project was also known as the Candela Hotel & Residences from 2007 to 2009 and was planned to include a hotel in addition to luxury condominiums. After Candela was removed from the project, the revised skyscraper proposal was approved in 2011 but would later undergo further changes in 2013. Construction did not begin until July 2015 due to financing issues that were later resolved. The building topped out in August 2017 and was completed in March 2018.

== History ==
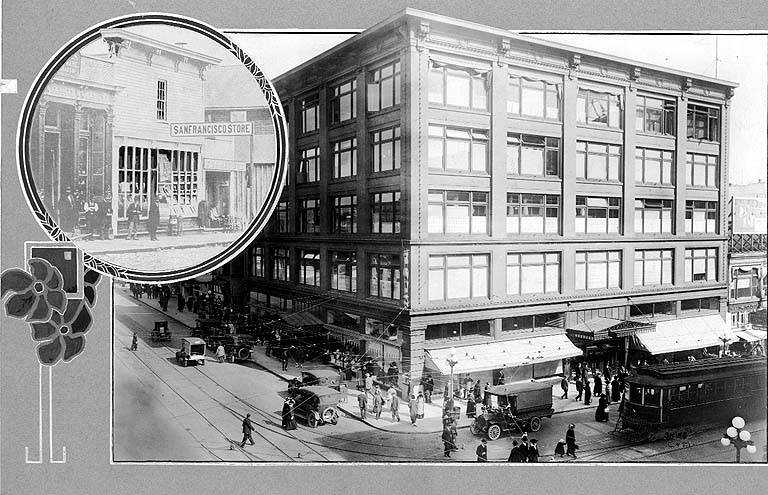
The MacDougall & Southwick department store, located at the southeast corner of 2nd Avenue & Pike Street until 1971.

The site, located at the southeast corner of 2nd Avenue and Pike Street in downtown Seattle, was home to the MacDougall & Southwick department store until the store closed in 1966. The five-story building was later demolished in 1971 and replaced with a surface parking lot.

Planning for a skyscraper at the site began in 2004, with developer Greg Smith of Urban Visions proposing a 27-story residential tower on the parking lot, which was zoned for an 11-story height limit. In 2006, the design was revised in response to major revisions to the downtown zoning code by the Seattle City Council.

The following year, luxury hotel company Candela Hotels announced plans to build its flagship hotel inside of the building at 2nd & Pike in addition to luxury condominiums planned by Urban Visions, planned to open in 2010. The proposed design from Tom Kundig featured a glass tower that narrowed in the middle, with the top 13 floors cantilevered out from the rest of the building. Candela was later removed from the building's plans and the project was resubmitted as a 340-apartment tower by the developer in December 2009.

The revised proposal was approved by the Seattle Department of Planning and Development on October 3, 2011.

In January 2013, amid a growing number of similar apartment projects in the city, Urban Visions announced that the proposed building's height would be downsized to 325 feet (99 m) and converted to mixed-use by incorporating office space. The planned downsizing was later scrapped in favor of a 27-story, mixed-use proposal announced the following month. The mixed-use proposal, designed by Zimmer Gunsul Frasca Partnership, featured a viewing terrace facing towards the Pike Place Market and a design that was dubbed a "tree tower". The design was dropped in favor of a more conventional design from Tom Kundig of Olson Kundig Architects; Urban Visions later secured funding from Japanese real estate developer Mitsui Fudosan's American office in December 2014, allowing the project to move forward.

Construction on the site began on July 23, 2015, under general contractor Sellen Construction. The building was topped out in August 2017, with the completion of the 39th floor. The building opened in March 2018.

The construction staging area for the project necessitated the closure of a protected bike lane on 2nd Avenue that was replaced with a covered lane separated from the street by water-filled plastic jersey barriers.

== Gallery ==
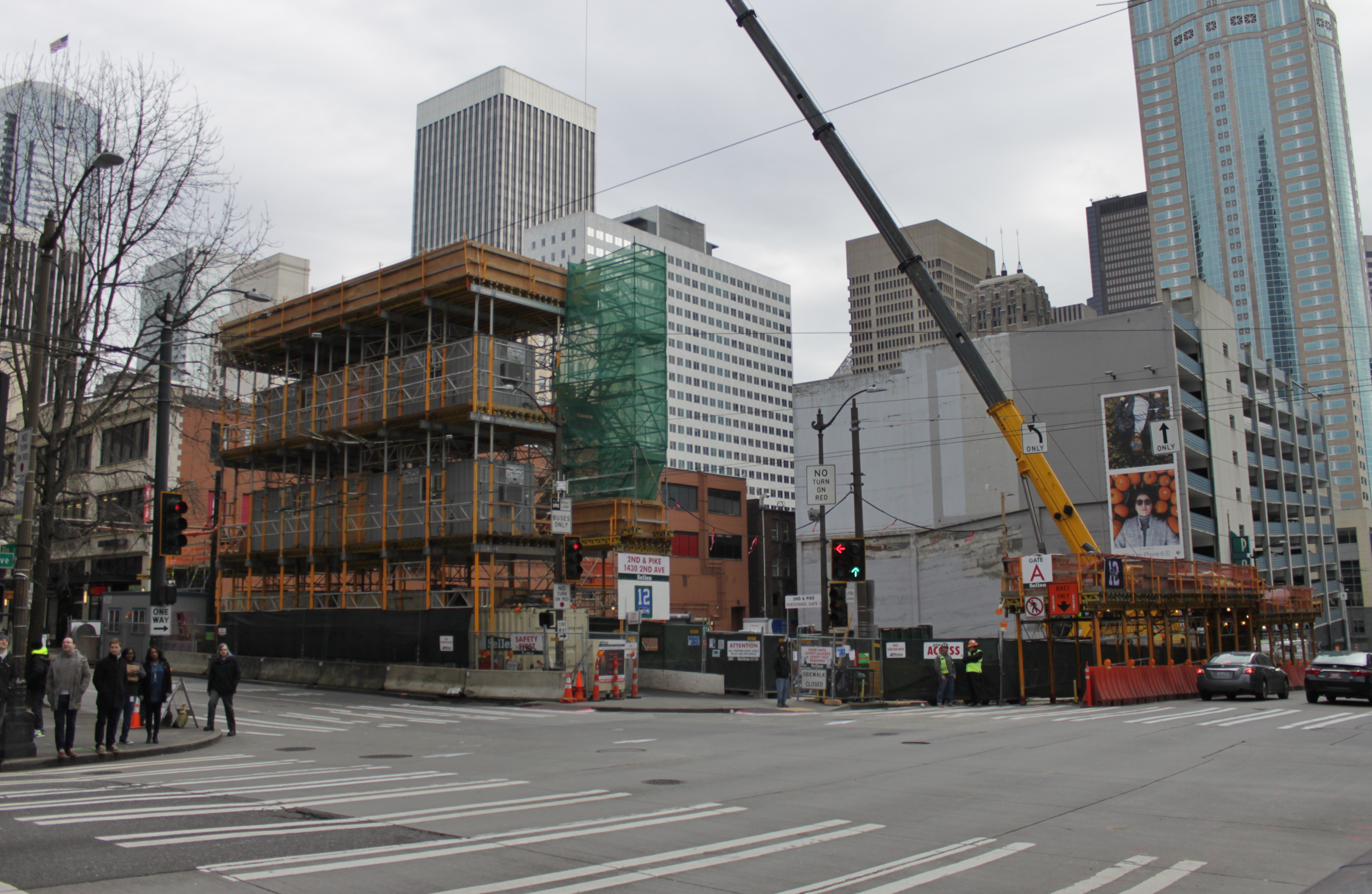
February 2016

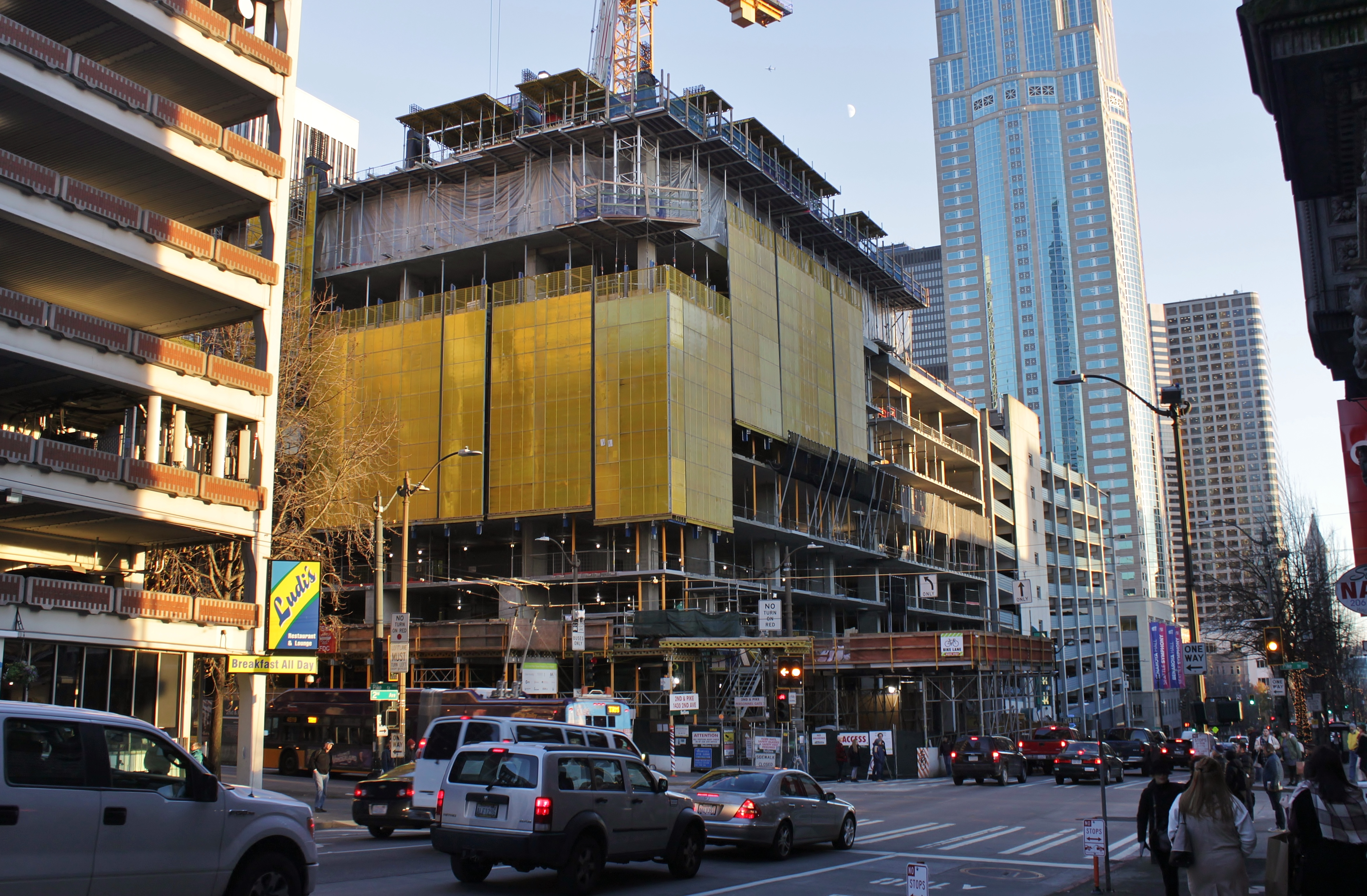
December 2016

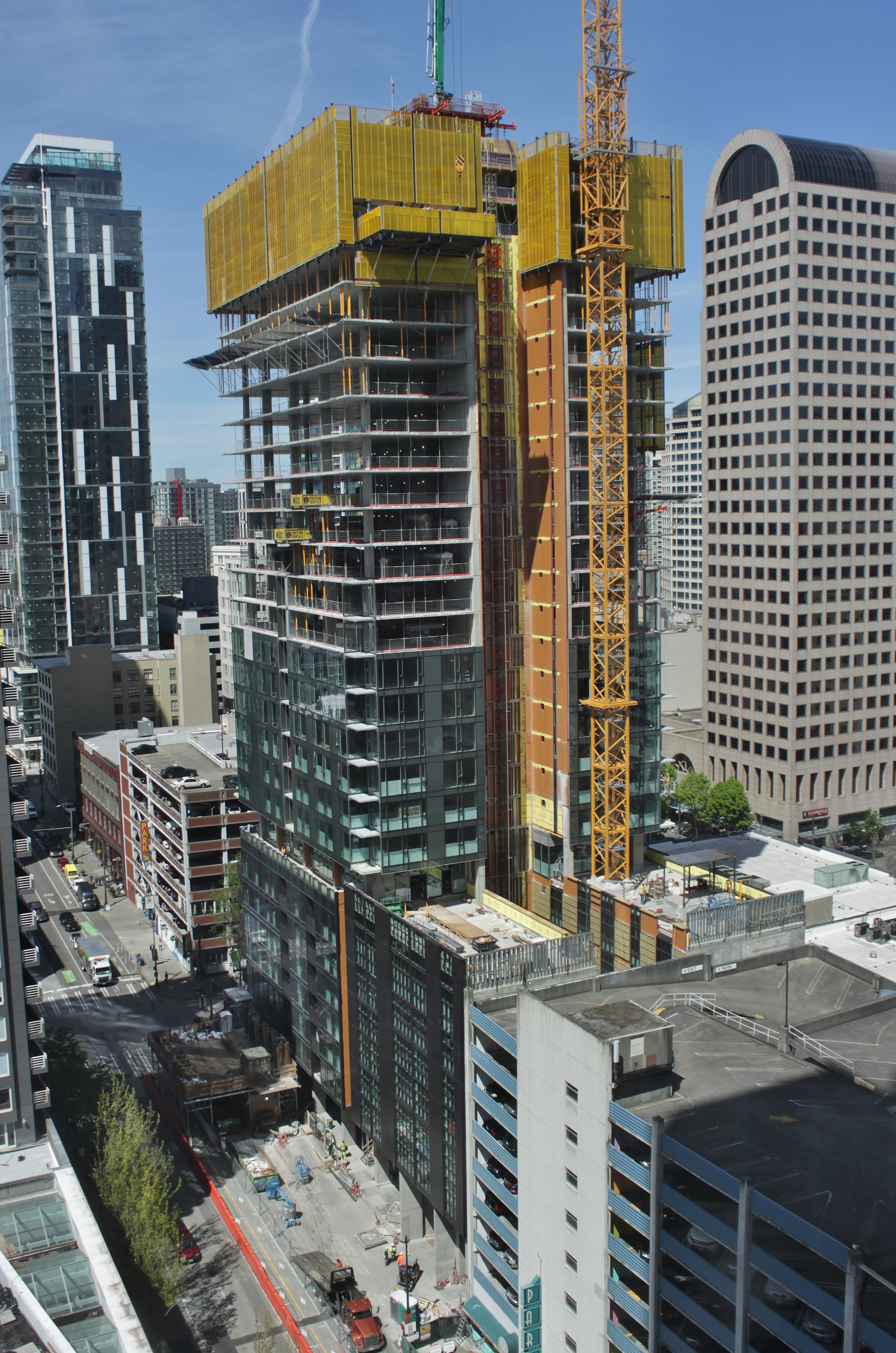
May 2017
