= 901 Fifth Avenue =

Skyscraper in downtown Seattle, Washington

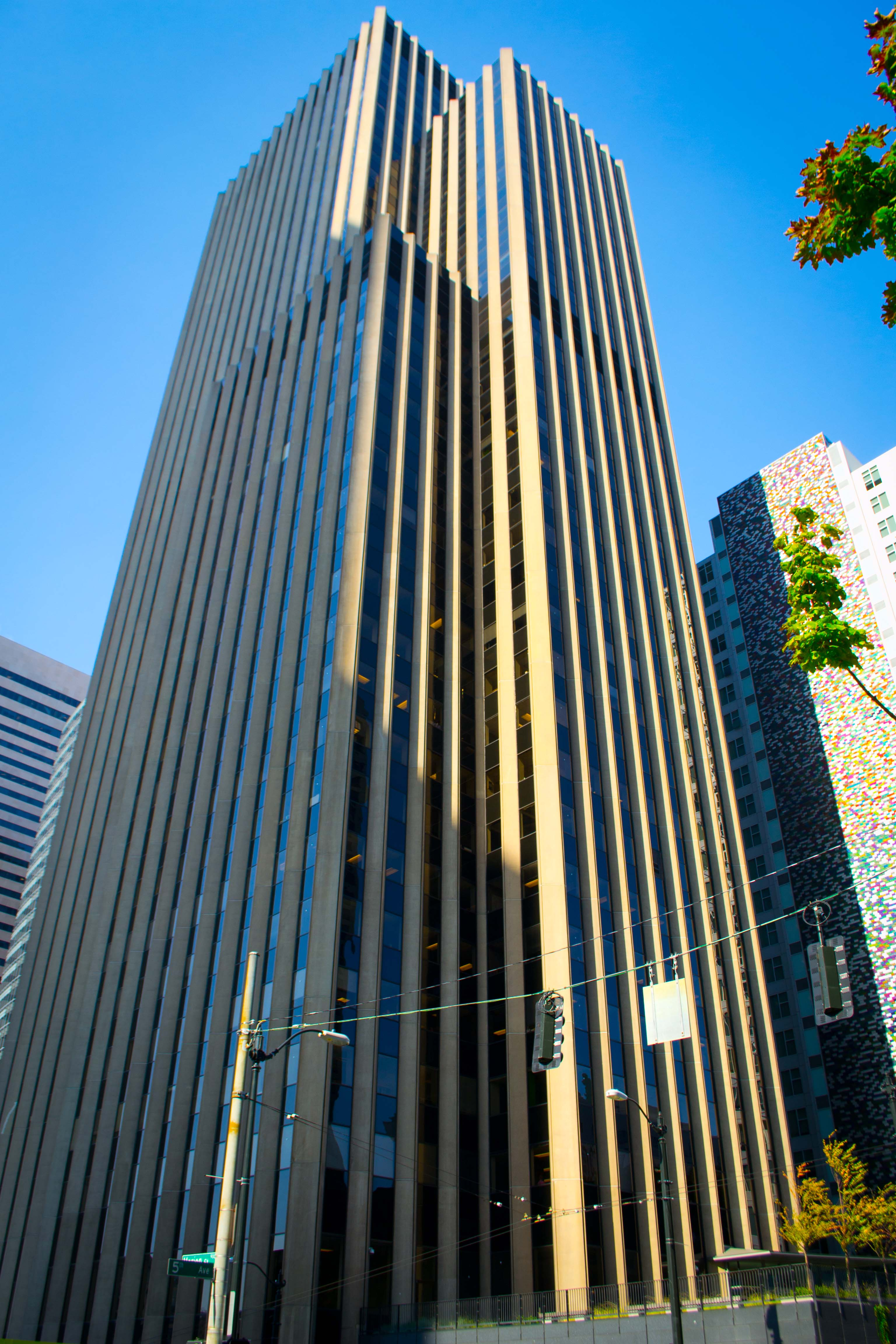

- Location within Downtown Seattle
- Former names: Union Bank of California Building
- Alternative names: Bank of California Building

General information
- Type: Commercial offices
- Architectural style: Modernism
- Location: 901 Fifth Avenue; Seattle, Washington
- Coordinates: 47.60583°N 122.3320°W
- Construction started: 1970
- Completed: 1973
- Owner: 901 Fifth Avenue Acquisitions LLC

Height
- Roof: 163.38 m (536.0 ft)

Technical details
- Floor count: 42; 3 below ground
- Floor area: 49,106 m^{2} (528,570 sq ft)
- Lifts/elevators: 10

Design and construction
- Architect: John Graham & Company
- Main contractor: Howard S. Wright Construction

901 Fifth Avenue is a 163.38 m (536.0 ft) skyscraper in downtown Seattle, Washington. It was completed in 1973 and has 42 floors. It is the 11th tallest building in Seattle, and was designed by John Graham and Associates. The building was opened as the Bank of California Building. Flood lights illuminate all sides of the tower at night. It was renovated in 2007 and achieved LEED Certified Silver status, which is rare for preexisting buildings.

Formerly the Union Bank of California Building, the name was changed to 901 Fifth Avenue following the sale by Beacon Capital Partners to Kennedy Wilson Inc. of Beverly Hills. From its opening in 1973 to July 2007 the building address was 900 Fourth Avenue.

In 2016, the building was purchased by Schnitzer West, developer of the nearby Madison Centre, and Investcorp for $223.3 million. The lobby was renovated in 2017 at a cost of $4.6 million to prepare for another sale. The Vanbarton Group purchased the building for $305 million in 2019. The company sold the building to 901 Fifth Avenue Acquisitions LLC, a group of local investors led by Chris Langer, Joe Razore, and Larry Benaroya, for $48.3 million in 2026.

The building's largest tenants are Cray and PitchBook Data. A flagship Bartell Drugs store opened at the base on the west side in 2003 and closed in 2023 after Rite Aid acquired the company.

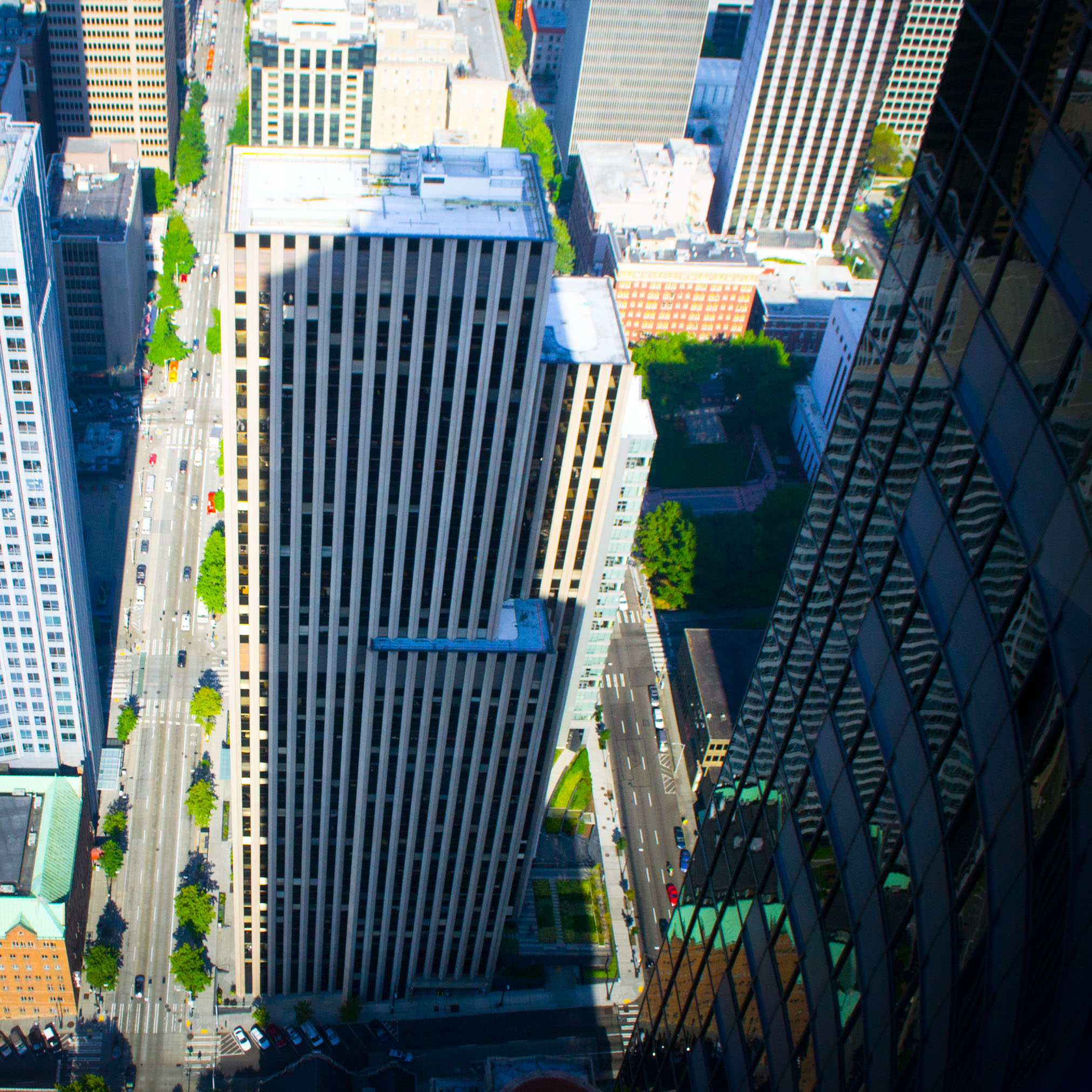
Viewed from the Columbia Center Sky View deck

== See also ==
- List of tallest buildings in Seattle
