= 1600 Seventh Avenue =

32-story skyscraper in Seattle, Washington

1600 Seventh
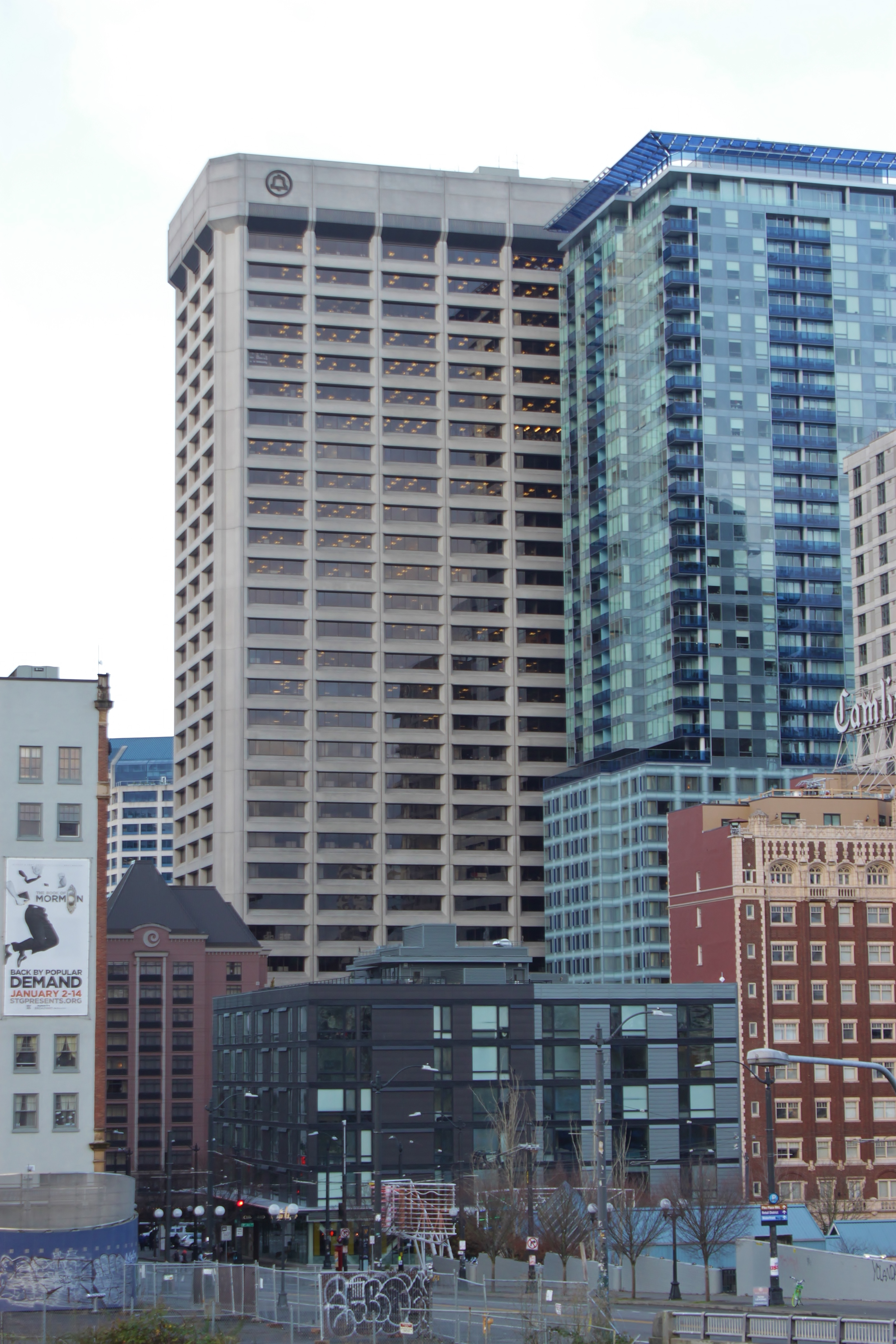

- Location within Downtown Seattle
- Alternative names: 1600 Bell Plaza; Pacific Northwest Bell Building; US West Communications; 1600 Qwest Plaza

General information
- Type: Commercial offices
- Architectural style: International
- Location: 1600 7th Avenue; Seattle, Washington
- Coordinates: 47.6132°N 122.3344°W
- Construction started: 1973
- Completed: 1976

Height
- Roof: 498.01 ft (151.79 m)

Technical details
- Floor count: 32
- Floor area: 766,800 sq ft (71,240 m^{2})

Design and construction
- Architect: John Graham & Company
- Main contractor: Hoffman Construction Co. of Washington

1600 Seventh is a 32-story, 498 ft (152 m) skyscraper in downtown Seattle, Washington, United States. Designed by John Graham & Company, it was completed in 1976; as of 2022, it is the 22nd-tallest building in the city. Originally built as the headquarters of Pacific Northwest Bell, it was first known as the Pacific Northwest Bell Building during construction and subsequently as 1600 Bell Plaza upon opening; it was later known as Bell Plaza and Qwest Plaza under US West and Qwest ownership.

== History ==
Pacific Northwest Bell had used as many as 12 buildings in Seattle to serve the city and its surrounding area since the 1920s. Owing to the rapid growth in the region, the company elected to consolidate its headquarters in one location. In the wake of the 1973–1975 recession, the main architects, John Graham & Company, elected to design the building with an emphasis on utilitarianism; it stood in stark contrast to the nearby Seafirst Building, which was built during the previous decade.

The Hoffman Construction Company of Portland, Oregon was the general contractor for the building.

The building was topped off in July 1975; however, the company elected to forgo a ceremony due to perception concerns in light of a then-recent rate increase proposal that was to add $64 million in revenue.

The building was dedicated on November 22, 1976, in a ceremony featuring then-Governor Dan Evans and various politicians and business leaders as well as Don Ameche, the actor who portrayed Alexander Graham Bell in the 1939 biographical film about him; the total cost of construction was estimated at $40 million. A naming contest for the building resulted in the selection of "1600 Bell Plaza", proposed by company employee Bev Ardueser, from 2,000 entries.

Qwest reduced its presence in the building to half-occupancy in 2008 as part of consolidation plans. That same year, the company listed the property for sale; a tentative deal with an unknown buyer fell through amid the Great Recession.

In April 2012, a year after acquiring Qwest Communications, CenturyLink sold the building to New York real estate investment firm Clarion Partners for $137 million. Clarion is now leasing lower-level floors to CenturyLink and WeWork. Floors 4-6 and 16–32 are occupied by Nordstrom, and the ground floor holds retail establishments.

== See also ==
- List of tallest buildings in Seattle
