= 800 Fifth Avenue =

Skyscraper in Seattle

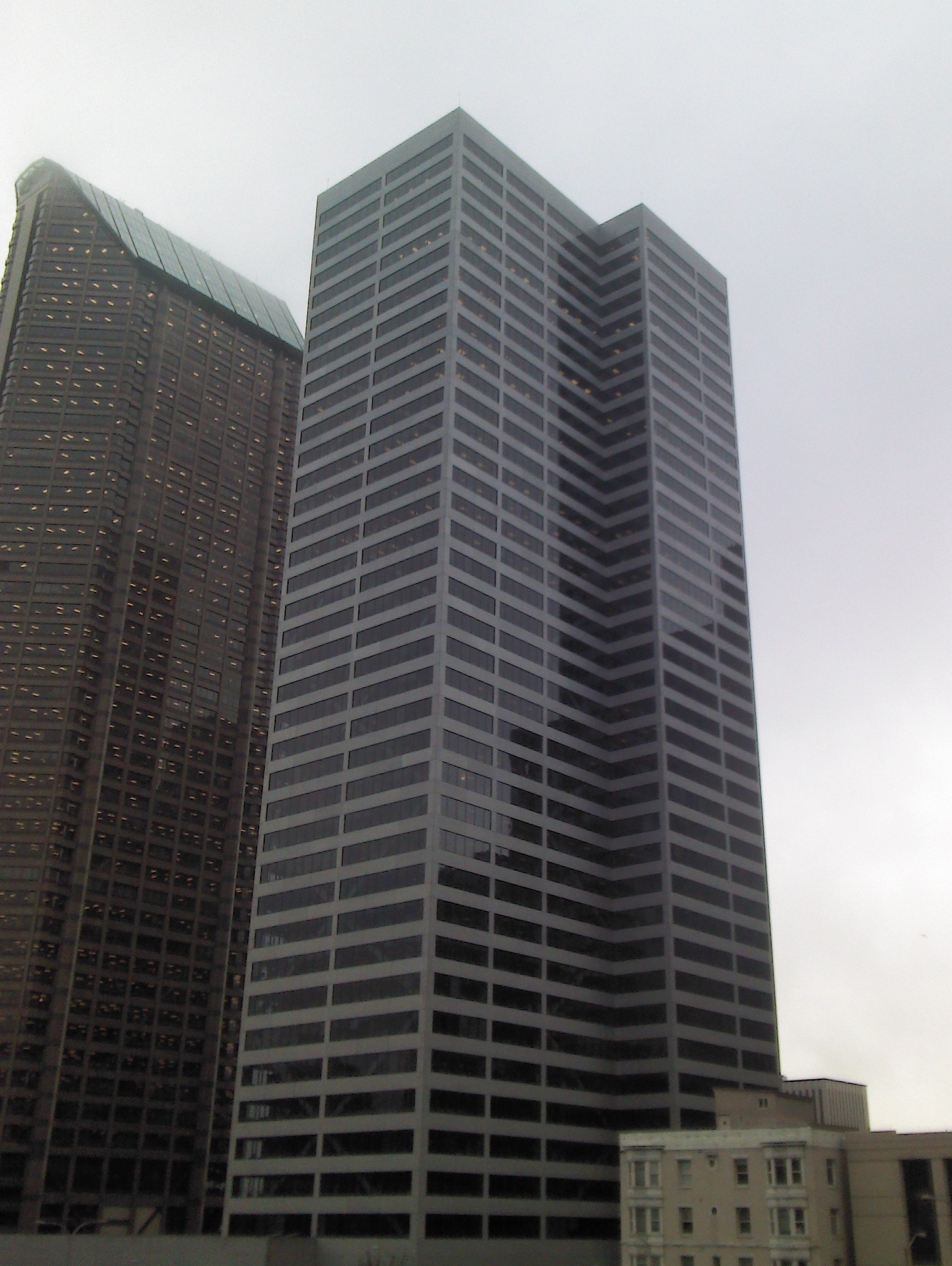

- Location within downtown Seattle
- Alternative names: 800 Fifth Avenue Plaza

General information
- Type: Commercial offices
- Location: 800 5th Avenue; Seattle, Washington, U.S.
- Coordinates: 47.6058°N 122.3302°W
- Construction started: 1979
- Completed: 1981
- Owner: BPP 800 Fifth Property Owner LLC
- Management: EQ Office

Height
- Roof: 165.51 m (543.0 ft)

Technical details
- Floor count: 42
- Floor area: 934,000 sq ft (86,800 m^{2})

Design and construction
- Architect: 3DI/International
- Developer: Hines
- Structural engineer: Magnusson Klemencic Associates (formerly Skilling, Helle, Christiansen, Robertson)
- Main contractor: J.A. Jones Construction

800 Fifth Avenue is a 166-meter (545 ft) skyscraper in Seattle, in the U.S. state of Washington. It was constructed from 1979 to 1981 and has 42 floors. It is the tenth-tallest building in Seattle and was designed by 3D/International.

The building was previously known as Bank of America Fifth Avenue Plaza when its naming rights were held by the Bank of America. It was originally built for Seafirst Bank, which was acquired by the Bank of America. In April 2014, its name was changed to 800 Fifth Avenue. The building was acquired by EQ Office in 2019. It underwent an interior renovation in 2022 that was designed by Olson Kundig to create more lobby space and a public garden.

== Major tenants ==
- Allstate
- Bank of America
- BDO
- Electronic Arts
- Office of the Attorney General of Washington
- Parametric Portfolio Associates
- Providence Health & Services
- Sonos

== See also ==
- List of tallest buildings in Seattle
