= The Net (building) =

Planned high-rise office building in Downtown Seattle, Washington

- Location within downtown Seattle
- Former names: 888 Second Avenue, The Marion
- Alternative names: 801 Third Avenue

General information
- Status: Proposed
- Type: Mixed-use
- Location: 801 3rd Avenue; Seattle, Washington, U.S.
- Coordinates: 47°36′16″N 122°20′00″W

Height
- Roof: 542 feet (165 m)

Technical details
- Floor count: 36
- Floor area: 850,000 square feet (79,000 m^{2})

Design and construction
- Architecture firm: NBBJ
- Developer: Urban Visions
- Structural engineer: Magnusson Klemencic Associates

Website
- www.thenetseattle.com

The Net, formerly known as The Marion, is a planned high-rise office building in Downtown Seattle, Washington, United States. In its current iteration, it is planned to be 36 stories tall and include 850,000 square feet (79,000 m^{2}) of office and retail space. The project is being developed by Urban Visions, which previously proposed a 77-story tower on the site that would have become the tallest building in the city. It was later downsized to 60 stories after a design competition and 36 stories after further refinement. Demolition of an existing building on the site was completed in 2021, but the project did not begin construction.

== Earlier proposals ==
Urban Visions filed preliminary plans in 2013 to build a 77-story supertall skyscraper on property it owned between Marion and Columbia streets in Downtown Seattle. The 1,200-foot-tall (370 m) tower, named the 888 Tower, would have eclipsed the Columbia Center as the tallest building in Seattle. A competition was held in 2014 to select a design for the supertall tower, resulting in Urban Visions favoring NBBJ's 60-story proposal over a 77-story proposal from Gensler.

The NBBJ proposal featured a 65-foot-wide (20 m) atrium in the middle of the tower that would function like a skylight; the 60-story tower also incorporated floor layouts that would have allowed for 10 to 15 more people per floor despite the loss of a central core, allowing for the height to be reduced. It would have been mixed-use, consisting of retail space on the ground floor, and offices and condominiums on higher floors. The tower would have occupied the full city block between 2nd and 3rd Avenues and Columbia and Marion streets. When completed, it would have become the second-tallest building in Seattle and the fifth-tallest on the West Coast of the United States.

== New proposal ==
In October 2017, Urban Visions announced that it would scale back its plans and build a 28-story tower on the eastern half of the block with 600,000 square feet (56,000 m^{2}) of office space. The project was renamed The Net and given a new design by NBBJ, featuring a steel exoskeleton that wrapped around the building. Another design revision in early 2018 increased the height of the building to 36 stories and added a marketspace at street level with 15,000 square feet (1,400 m^{2}) of public space. A prominent glass staircase would connect all floors of the building. The top three stories of the building would have an outdoor terrace that sloped downwards from the 36th floor.

Urban Visions announced a joint venture with Japanese developer Mitsui Fudosan America in September 2020 to finance the project at a cost of $127.7 million. Demolition of two buildings on the block's east side began in March 2021, while the project was planned to begin construction after an anchor tenant is signed. The building was originally planned to open no sooner than early 2027. On July 17, 2021, one of the partially-demolished buildings on the site collapsed onto 3rd Avenue, forcing a shutdown of the street for two days. As of 2024, the site remains an empty lot.

== See also ==
- List of tallest buildings in Seattle
