= Ren (building) =

High-rise building in Seattle, Washington

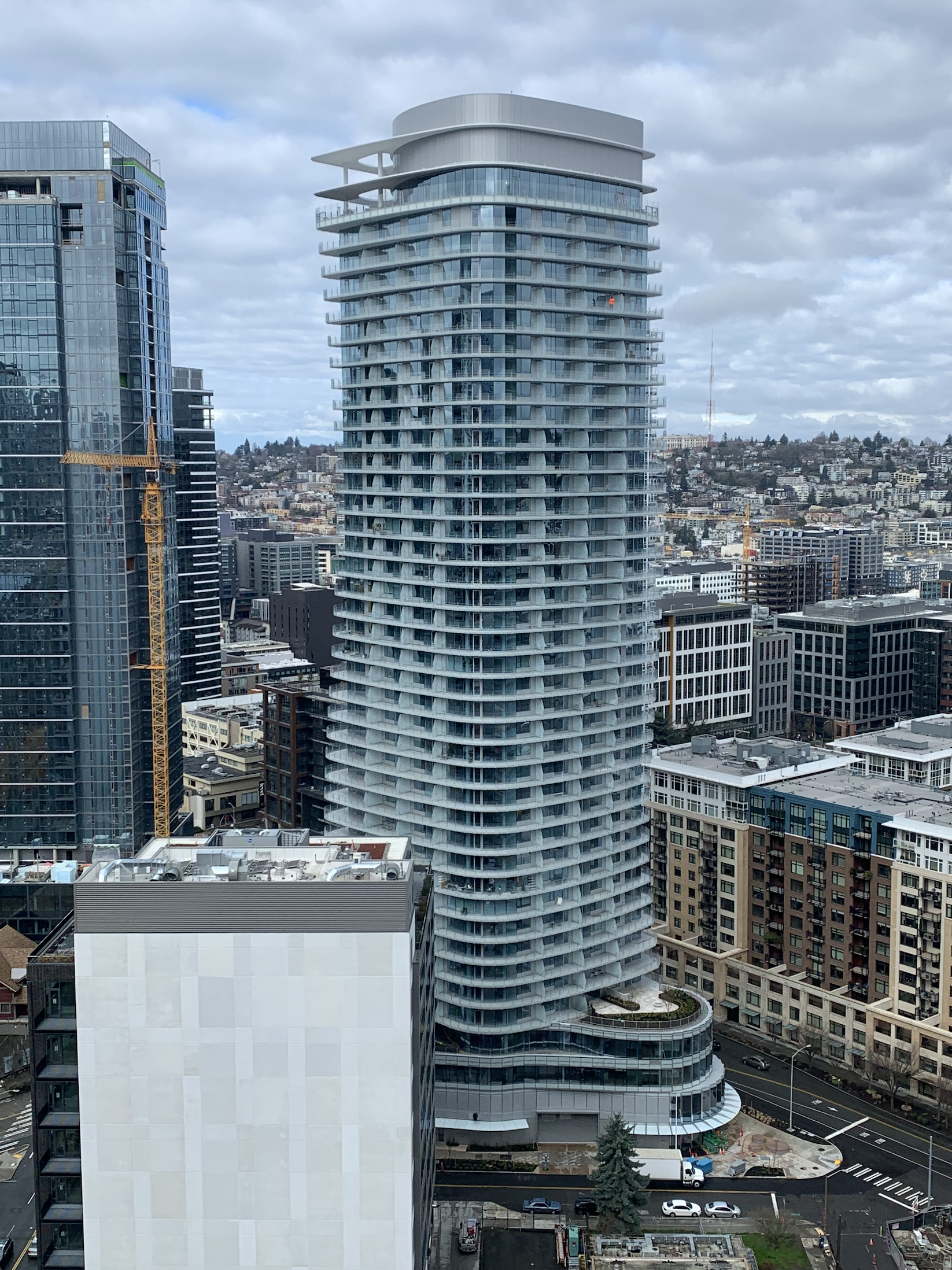
- View from the southeast
- Interactive map of the Ren area
- Alternative names: Denny Centre

General information
- Status: Completed
- Type: Residential and retail
- Location: 2014 Fairview Avenue; Seattle, Washington, U.S.
- Coordinates: 47°37′06″N 122°20′02″W
- Construction started: August 2018
- Opened: January 2022

Height
- Architectural: 440 ft (130 m)

Technical details
- Floor count: 42

Design and construction
- Architecture firm: ZGF Architects, Cotter Architects
- Developer: Bosa Properties

Other information
- Number of units: 457 apartments
- Parking: 308 spaces

Website
- renseattle.com

Ren, stylized as REN and also known as Denny Centre, is a residential skyscraper in the Denny Triangle neighborhood of Seattle, Washington, United States. The 42-story tower has 440 apartments and is located on a triangular lot at the intersection of Denny Way and Fairview Avenue. Construction began in 2018 and was completed in early 2022.

== History ==
The triangular lot on the southeast side of Denny Way and Fairview Avenue was home to a two-story office and retail building named the Denny Center, which was built in 1937. The lot was purchased by Vancouver-based Bosa Properties for $8 million in May 2007, with plans to not redevelop the building immediately. The firm filed plans to build a 450-unit residential tower on the property with the city government in September 2015. Bosa Properties, owned by Robert Bosa, was joined in the Denny Triangle neighborhood by Bosa Development (owned by his brother, Nat Bosa), who developed the Insignia Towers complex.

A preliminary design for the 41-story tower by ZGF Architects and Cotter Architects was unveiled in November 2015, featuring rounded edges to contrast with the "sharp, rectangular" designs of nearby high-rises. The tower's design underwent six revisions through consultations with the city government by the time its final environmental impact statement was released in February 2017. The project, renamed the Denny Centre, began construction in August 2018, a few months after the existing building had been demolished. To replace construction site visits during the COVID-19 pandemic, which restricted cross-border travel for the developers and architects based in Canada, remote tours via 360-degree video were used by the contractors on the project. The tower was branded as "Ren" and began pre-leasing in October 2021. It was opened to its first residents in January 2022 and was 60 percent leased by June.

In March 2023, Seattle-based pizzeria Tutta Bella announced that they would be opening a restaurant, cafe, marketplace, and bar at Ren. The company was awarded the sole rights to the building's hospitality and restaurant spaces, which comprise a total of 6,932 square feet (644.0 m^{2}). The Lobby Bar on the ground floor opened in May 2023.

== Design ==
Ren is a 42-story high-rise with 457 apartment units and a three-story podium with 10,000 square feet (930 m^{2}) of retail space. The tower has 308 parking stalls in a five-story underground garage accessed from Virginia Street. The tower has an undulating façade with softened edges, inspired by the "collision between two city grids". It has 23,000 square feet (2,100 m^{2}) of amenity space, including a rooftop terrace, gym, co-working spaces, and a dog spa. The Seattle Daily Journal of Commerce named Ren the 2022 Building of the Year, with voters praising its curves and unique design. The building also won the Best Tall Building in the Americas by the Council on Tall Buildings and Urban Habitat during their 2023 awards.
