= 1111 Third Avenue =

454 ft high-rise office building located in downtown Seattle, Washington

Coordinates: 47°36′24″N 122°20′6″W

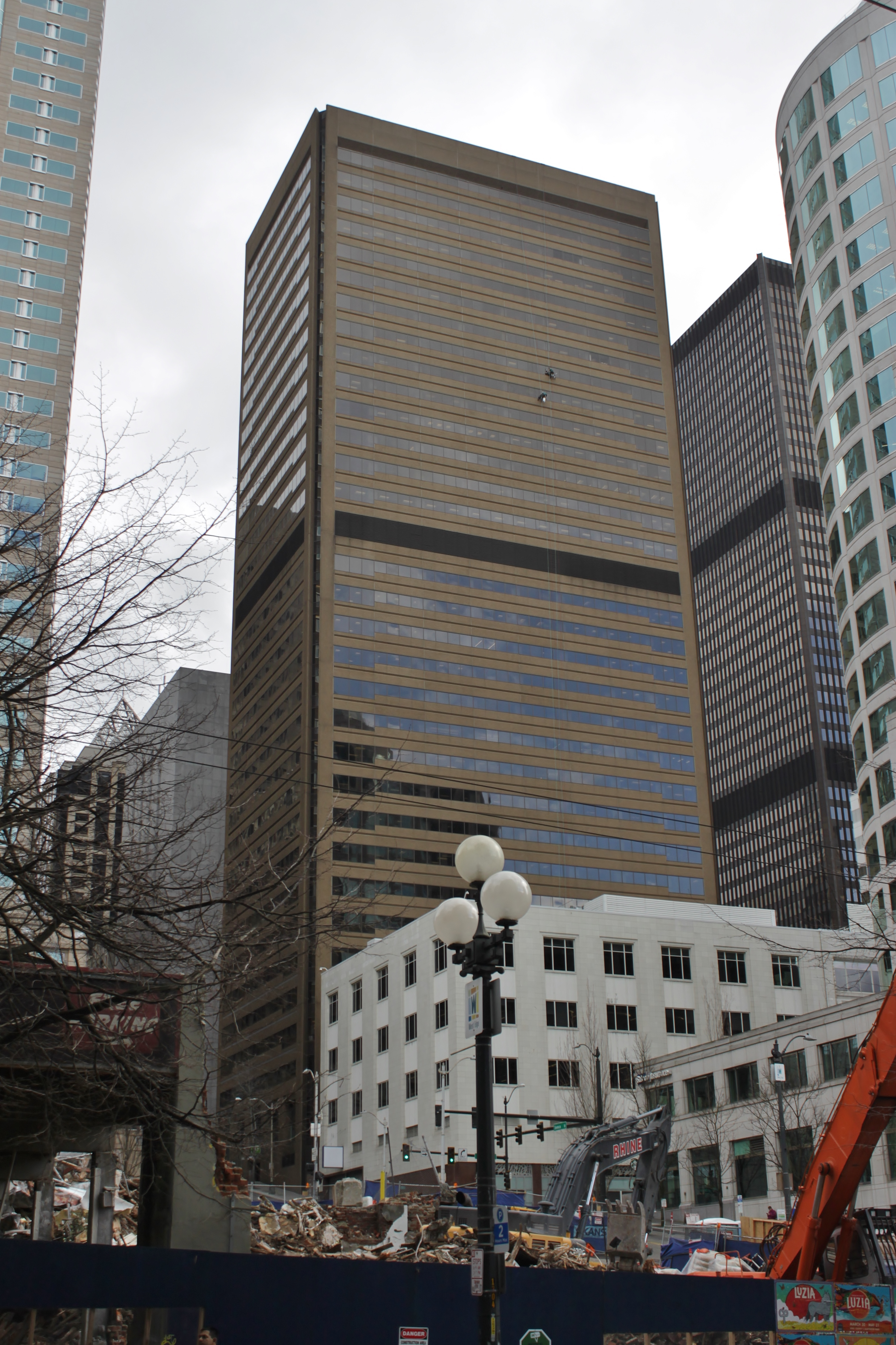

- Location within downtown Seattle

General information
- Type: Office
- Location: 1111 3rd Avenue, Seattle, Washington
- Completed: 1980
- Owner: Unico Properties
- Management: Unico Properties

Height
- Roof: 454 ft (138 m)

Technical details
- Floor count: 34

1111 Third Avenue is a 454 ft (138 m) high-rise office building located in downtown Seattle, Washington. It was completed in 1980 and has 34 floors. At the time of the completion, it became the 8th tallest building in Seattle. It is owned and operated by Unico Properties. It has an outdoor landscaped area with seating and tables accented by bronze statues by sculptor Robert Graham, and floor to ceiling windows. The exterior of the building is composed of precast concrete with exposed aggregate surfaces and dual-glazed, solar bronze glass.

== Major tenants ==
=== Law ===
- Lewis Brisbois Bisgaard & Smith

== See also ==
- List of tallest buildings in Seattle
