= Madison Centre =

530-foot-tall skyscraper in Downtown Seattle, Washington

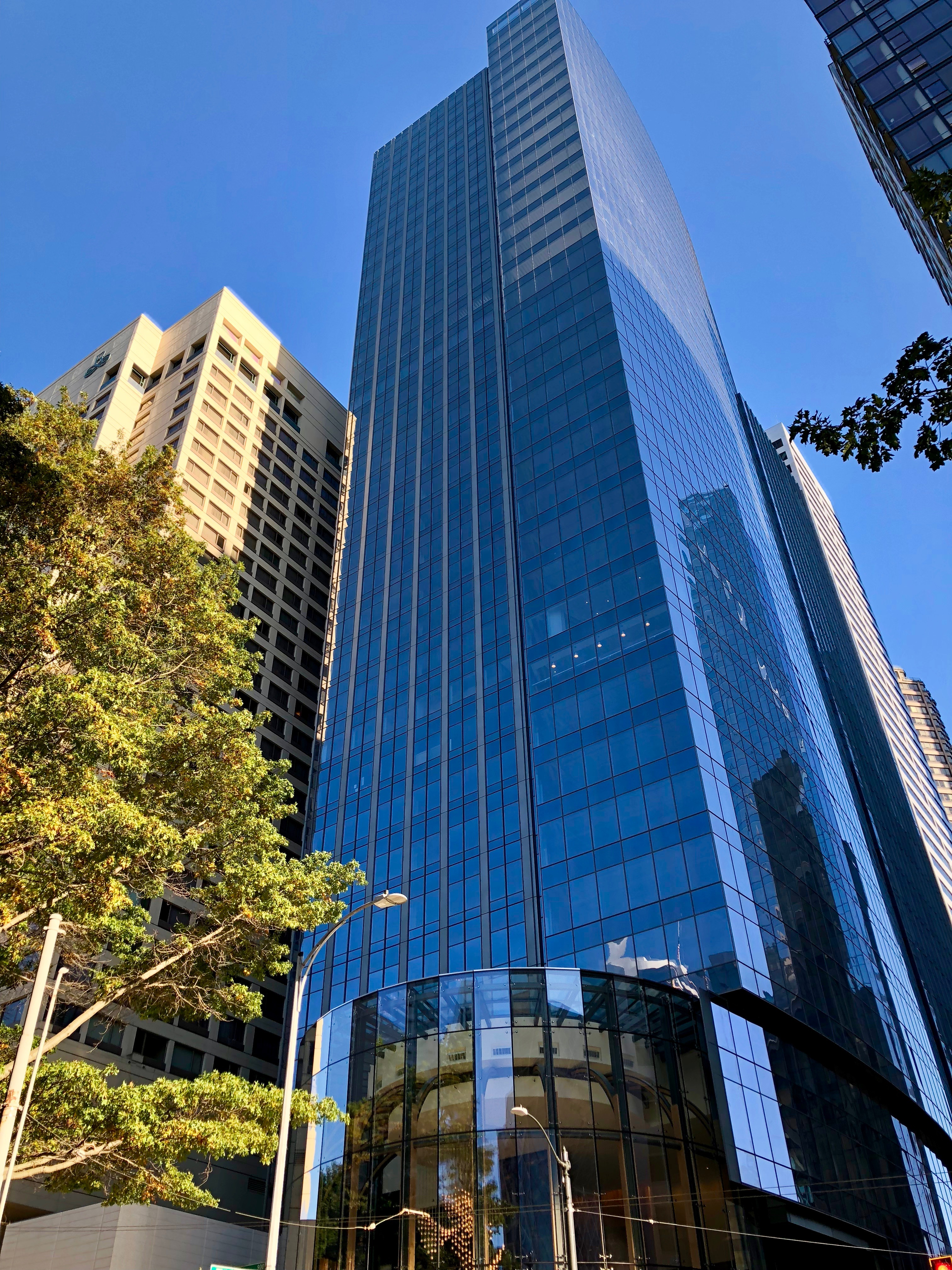
- Madison Centre in October 2017

- Location within Downtown Seattle
- Former names: M5 Commerce Centre, 505 Madison

General information
- Type: Office
- Location: 920 5th Avenue, Seattle, Washington 98104
- Coordinates: 47.606468°N 122.331282°W
- Construction started: 2014
- Opened: October 2017
- Cost: $157 million
- Owner: Boston Properties

Height
- Roof: 530 ft (160 m)
- Top floor: 37

Technical details
- Floor count: 37
- Floor area: 754,184 sq ft (70,066.0 m^{2})
- Lifts/elevators: 20

Design and construction
- Architect: NBBJ
- Developer: Schnitzer West
- Structural engineer: DCI Engineers
- Main contractor: Sellen Construction

Other information
- Parking: 480 spaces

Website
- www.madisoncentre.com/home

Madison Centre (formerly known as M5 Commerce Centre and 505 Madison) is a 530-foot-tall (160 m) skyscraper in Downtown Seattle, Washington. It was completed in October 2017 and has 37 floors of office space totaling 746,000 square feet (69,300 m^{2}) of gross leasable area. It is the thirteenth-tallest building in Seattle. It is located at the intersection of 5th Avenue and Madison Street in Downtown Seattle, adjacent to the Seattle Central Library and William Kenzo Nakamura United States Courthouse.

== History ==
Schnitzer West bought the existing property from the College Club of Seattle in 2007 and hoped to begin construction of a skyscraper as early as 2008. In the meantime, however, the late-2000s recession struck the economy and consequently the fate of many commercial real estate projects came under doubt, including 505 Madison. Further development of the project hinged on securing a sufficient number of preleases by 2009, which did not occur.

In 2012, the project was revived and the developer began seeking permits to start construction. Demolition of the pre-existing buildings on the site began in early September 2014. In February 2016, Cornerstone Real Estate Advisers (now merged into Barings) announced that it would enter a joint venture with Schnitzer West to develop Madison Centre. Construction on the tower topped out in October 2016, and the tower opened for occupancy in October 2017.

Madison Centre was sold in May 2022 to Boston Properties for $730 million.

== Tenants ==
The retail space facing Marion Street was leased to Amazon Go, the second store for the cashier-less convenience store. It opened on August 27, 2018. Hulu signed a major lease for 67,400 square feet (6,260 m^{2}) within the building in April 2019. Amazon Go closed in June 2023 and is planned to be replaced in 2024 by a small delicatessen and market.

== See also ==
- List of tallest buildings in Seattle
