= 1918 Eighth Avenue =

500-foot skyscraper in the Denny Regrade neighborhood of Seattle, Washington

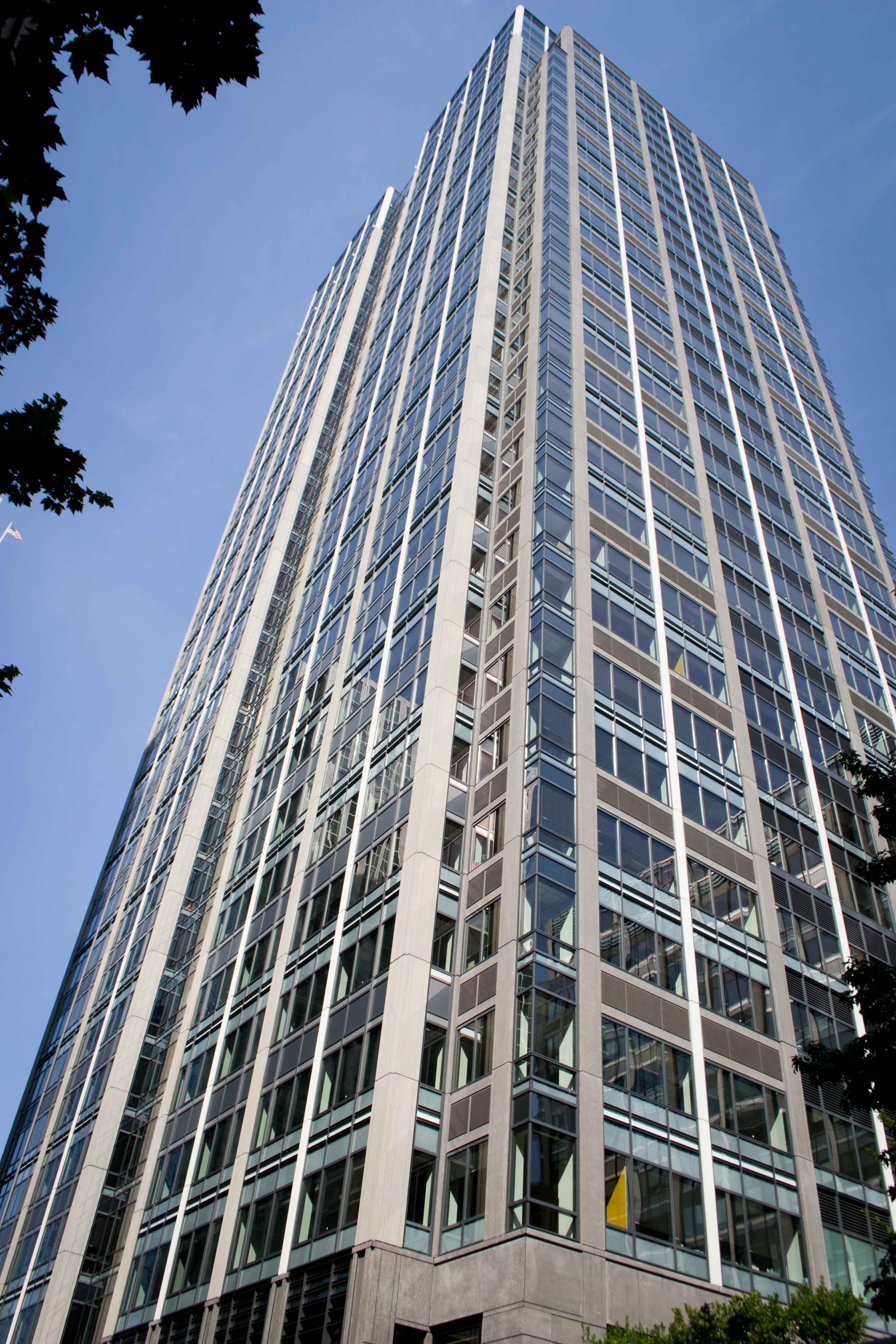

- Location within Downtown Seattle

General information
- Status: Completed
- Type: office
- Location: 1918 8th Ave, Seattle, Washington 98101, United States
- Coordinates: 47.6157°N 122.3361°W
- Completed: 2009
- Owner: JPMorgan Chase

Height
- Roof: 500 ft (150 m)

Technical details
- Floor count: 36
- Floor area: 658,744 sq ft (61,199.3 m^{2})

Design and construction
- Architect: NBBJ
- Main contractor: Sellen Construction

1918 Eighth Avenue is a 500-foot-tall (150 m) skyscraper in the Denny Regrade neighborhood of Seattle, in the U.S. state of Washington. It was completed in 2009 and has 36 floors, consisting mostly of office space. On August 25, 2008, the tower gained its first tenant, law firm Hagens Berman Sobol Shapiro. The firm leased 21,000 square feet (2,000 m^{2}) of the building. The 658,744-square-foot (61,199.3 m^{2}) building was developed by Schnitzer West, LLC and is now owned by an affiliate of JPMorgan Chase, which purchased it for $350 million after Schnitzer put it up for sale in May 2011, shortly after Amazon.com signed a long-term lease for more than two thirds of the office space.

== See also ==
- List of tallest buildings in Seattle
