= Aero1200 =

Future twin skyscraper complex in Seattle, Washington

- Rendering of the planned Aero1200 project
- Alternative names: 1200 Stewart; WB1200

General information
- Status: Under construction
- Type: Residential, hotel, and retail
- Location: 1200 Stewart Street; Seattle, Washington, U.S.
- Coordinates: 47°37′06″N 122°19′54″W
- Construction started: May 2018
- Estimated completion: 2027
- Cost: $381 million

Height
- Architectural: 484 ft (148 m)

Technical details
- Floor count: 48
- Floor area: 1,400,000 square feet (130,000 m^{2})

Design and construction
- Architecture firm: Henriquez Partners Architects Architect of Record: Ankrom Moisan
- Developer: OPTrust
- Main contractor: Graham Construction; Icon West Construction; JTM Construction

Other information
- Number of units: 927 apartments 121 hotel rooms
- Parking: 613 spaces

Website
- henriquezpartners.com/projects/wb-1200/

Aero1200, also known as 1200 Stewart and WB1200, is a future twin skyscraper complex in the Denny Triangle neighborhood of Seattle, Washington, United States. The project is located at the intersection of Stewart Street and Denny Way and comprises 927 apartments, a hotel, and retail space in two 48-story buildings. The retail space is planned to feature a music venue and is part of a three-story podium with an indoor galleria and a Boeing 747-400 fuselage. It began construction in 2018 and is scheduled to be completed in 2027—six years later than originally planned. The project was originally developed by the Westbank Corporation and later acquired by OPTrust.

== History ==
=== Planning ===
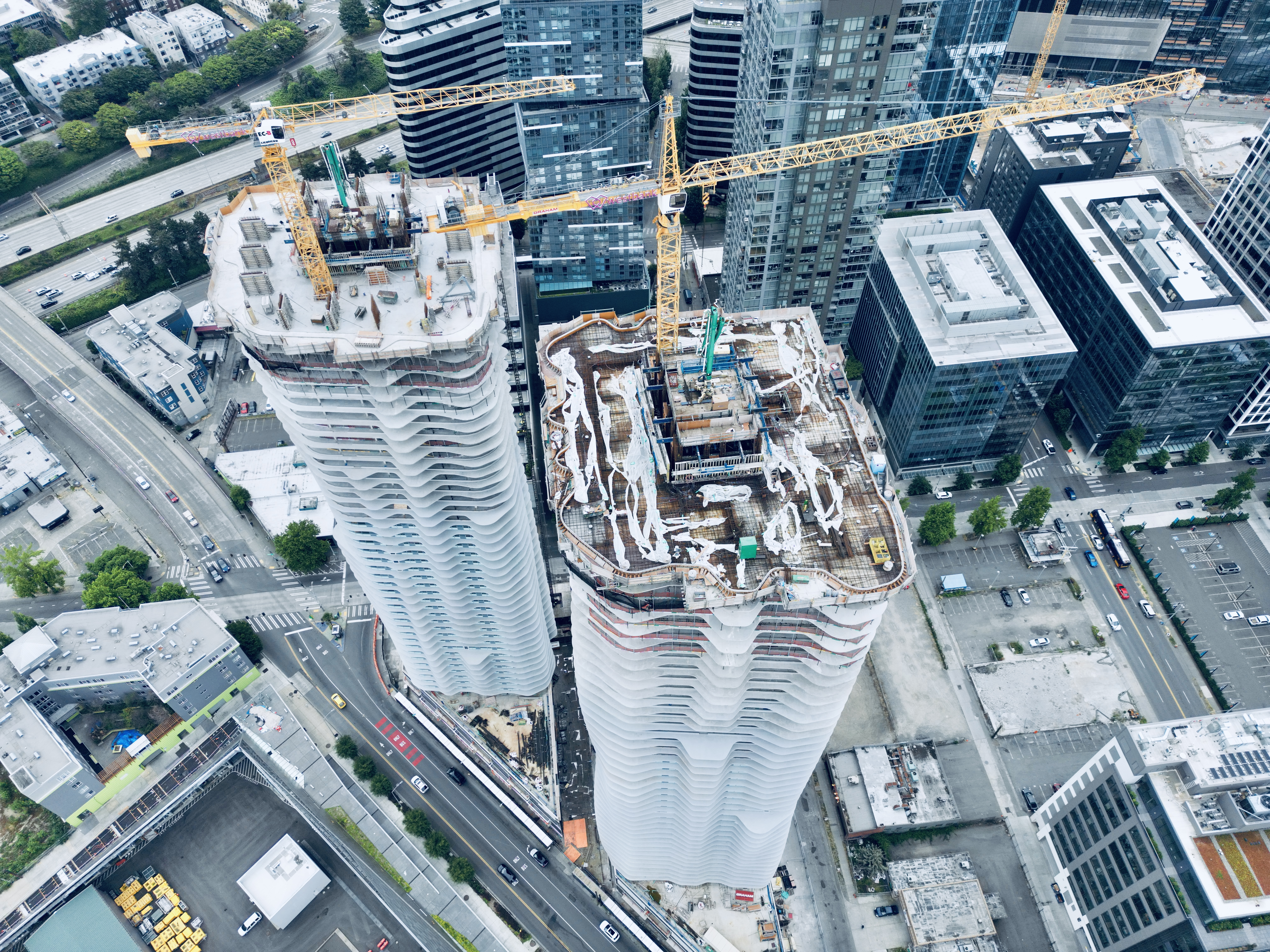
Aerial view of Aero1200 during construction in July 2022

The triangular site at 1200 Stewart Street, occupied by a mix of single-story businesses and parking lots also facing Denny Way and Minor Avenue, has been proposed as the site of a residential high-rise since the late 2000s by several developers. Lexas Companies submitted a proposal in 2007 to build a pair of 36-story mixed-use towers with condominiums and a hotel over a retail podium. The project, designed by architect Paul Thoryk, was to include 300 condominiums ranging from studio units to three-bedroom residences, a 250-room hotel, and a large fitness club. The tower was also proposed as the home of the College Club of Seattle, which had vacated its former building in Downtown Seattle, but negotiations later fell through.

Lexas had planned to begin construction in 2010, but progress was hindered by the search for a major financial investor amid the economic recession. The city government granted a master-use permit to Lexas for the project in 2012 with a four-year expiration date. The Westbank Corporation of Vancouver submitted a revised design to the city in September 2015, proposing a pair of 38-story towers with 892 residential units without a hotel. The company purchased the triangular project site for $52.8 million in October and unveiled a "wave-like design" by Henriquez Partners Architects a month later. An additional $297 million in financing from an unnamed pension fund was also announced in 2019 by DSC Capital. The project is expected to cost $381 million in total to construct.

=== Construction ===
In September 2016, the city government approved a revised master-use permit for the project, which would comprise two 45-story towers with 1,050 total residential units above a retail podium and 736 parking stalls in an underground garage. The permit was later modified to add four stories of residential units with a $10 million fee paid into the city's mandatory housing affordability fund. Construction began in May 2018 under general contractor Graham Construction; the project was planned to be completed in 2021. Graham and Westbank were later accused by subcontractors of failure to pay for labor or supplies; the dispute, along with the COVID-19 pandemic and a regional concrete workers strike, contributed to delays for the project.

Graham stepped down from the project in late 2022 and filed a $50.1 million lien against Westbank. Several subcontractors also filed liens against Westbank and Graham for alleged failures to pay for work between 2018 and 2022. Icon West Construction replaced Graham as the main contractor, with construction managed by JTM Construction beginning in early 2023. The framework for the Boeing 747 fuselage in the galleria was erected in late 2024. Phased occupancy was scheduled to start in 2025, but was delayed to 2026.

The construction loans that were used to finance the WB1200 project in 2019, originally set at $297 million and later expanded to $420 million were consolidated in August 2025. Westbank lost control of the project, which remains with the same limited liability company but under new ownership. OPTrust, a Toronto-based developer and pension funds manager, took ownership and has planned to announce a rebranding of the project. The Boeing 747 fuselage was cut into 39 sections and trucked form California; installation of the fuselage sections began in January 2026. The project was renamed to Aero1200 in May 2026 by OPTrust and a 121-room hotel named Aerolux was added; it is scheduled to open in 2027.

== Design ==
Aero1200 occupies a triangular lot bound to the north by Denny Way, to the east by Yale Avenue, to the south by Stewart Street, and to the west by Minor Avenue. It is located adjacent to Interstate 5 in the northeast corner of the Denny Triangle neighborhood. It consists of two 48-story towers with 927 residential units above an eight-story podium with 148,700 square feet (13,810 m^{2}) of retail space and amenities. A hotel, Aerolux, will have 121 rooms in the western tower.

The podium is planned to have a two-story music venue operated by Live Nation with 2,300 seats and 40,000 square feet (3,700 m^{2}) of space. The retail portion will have a Trader Joe's grocery store and other stores. An indoor galleria within the podium connecting Denny Way and Stewart Street will include a decommissioned Boeing 747-400 fuselage to hang 14 feet (4.3 m) above the walkway and serve as office space for Westbank. The fuselage was purchased from a scrapyard in Victorville, California, and was formerly part of the United Airlines fleet from 1990 to 2017.

The residential towers, designed by Henriquez Partners Architects, will have sculpted balconies that are shaped into a "wave-like" facade inspired by the Aqua skyscraper in Chicago. The balconies, mainly concentrated on the north side of the towers, will have gardens and trees to create a "sensual form". The residential towers will also have a rooftop patio, a dog park, and a swimming pool. The complex will have 613 total parking stalls in a four-story underground garage accessed from Minor Avenue, with commercial and retail spaces separate from those for residential use.
