= Fourth and Madison Building =

40-story skyscraper in downtown Seattle, Washington

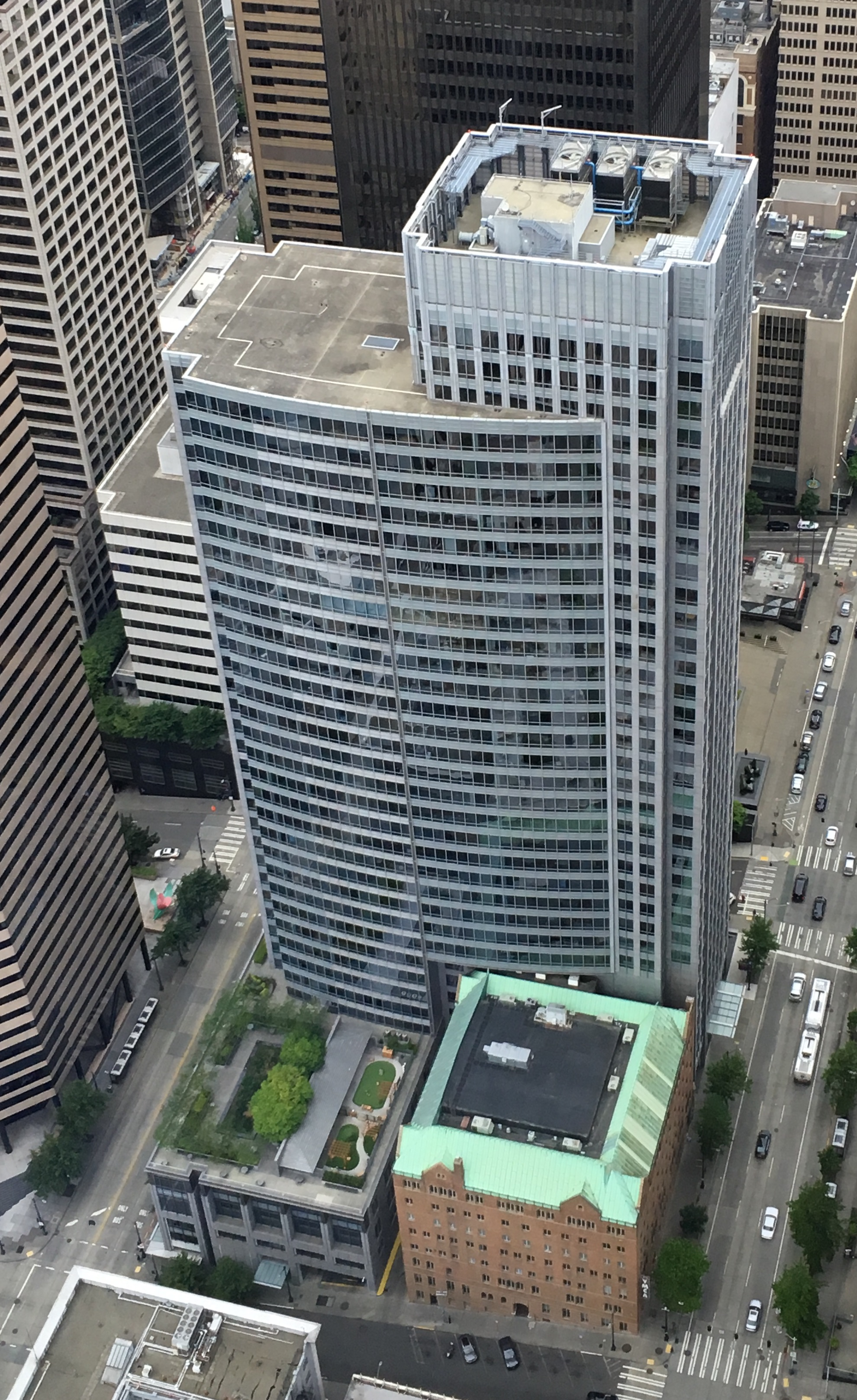

- Location within Downtown Seattle
- Former names: IDX Tower

General information
- Type: Commercial offices
- Location: 925 Fourth Avenue; Seattle, Washington
- Coordinates: 47.605498°N 122.333032°W
- Construction started: 2000
- Completed: 2002
- Owner: TIAA-CREF

Height
- Roof: 156.06 m (512.0 ft)

Technical details
- Floor count: Above ground: 40; Below ground: 2
- Floor area: 845,000 sq ft (78,500 m^{2})
- Lifts/elevators: 22

Design and construction
- Architects: Zimmer Gunsul Frasca Partnership; Kendall/Heaton
- Developer: Hines Interests Limited Partnership
- Structural engineer: Magnusson Klemencic Associates
- Main contractor: PCL Construction

Website
- fourthandmadison.com

The Fourth and Madison Building (formerly the IDX Tower) is a 40-story skyscraper in downtown Seattle, Washington. The building is located at 925 Fourth Avenue, at the intersection with Madison Street. Upon its completion in 2002, the late-modernist highrise was Seattle's first building to exceed 500 ft (150 m) in over a decade.

In 2007, Fourth and Madison was awarded the BOMA International Office Building of the Year Award in the 500,000–1,000,000 sq ft (46,000–93,000 m^{2}) category.

The rooftop garden on the seventh floor is a privately owned public space (POPS).

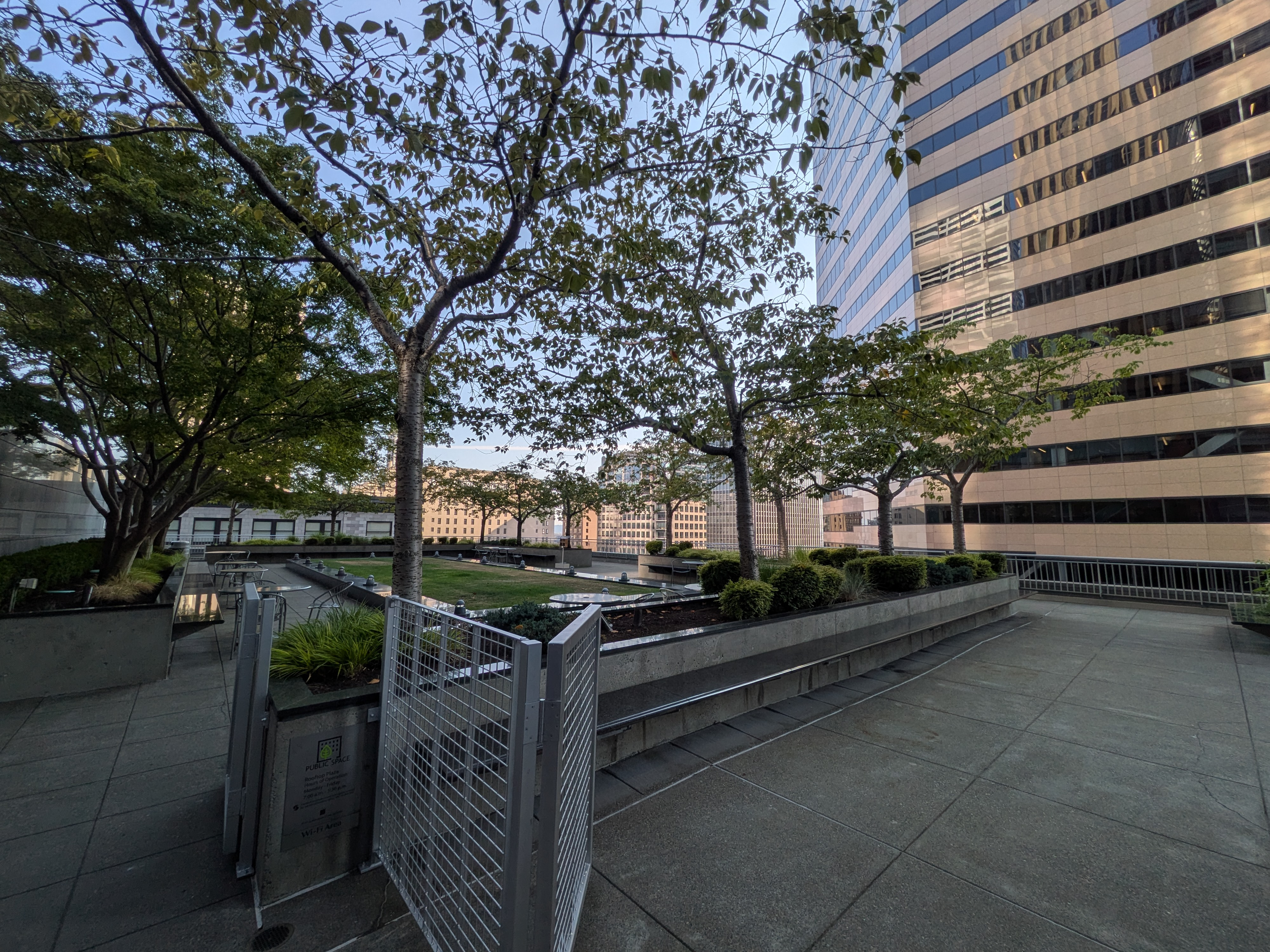
The 7th floor courtyard, viewed from the entrance

Construction of the foundation required shoring around the Great Northern Tunnel and Downtown Seattle Transit Tunnel. The tower also cantilevers 12 feet (3.7 m) over the Downtown YMCA.
