= Onni South Lake Union =

Residential buildings in Lake Union, Seattle

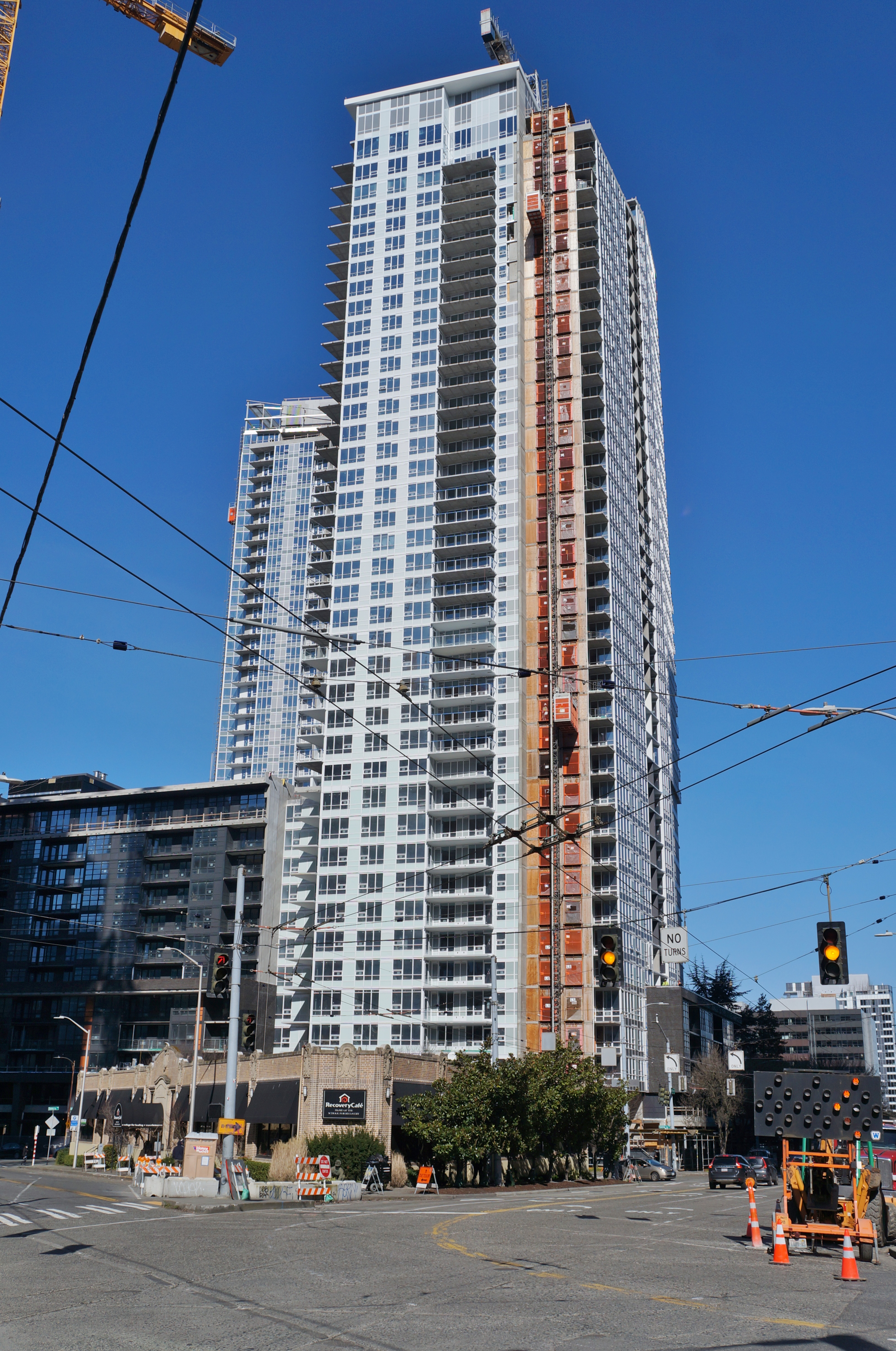
- Under construction, March 2021
- Interactive map of the Onni South Lake Union area
- Alternative names: 1120 Denny Way

General information
- Status: Completed
- Type: Residential
- Location: 1120 Denny Way; Seattle, Washington, US
- Coordinates: 47°37′08″N 122°20′06″W
- Construction started: 2017
- Opened: May 2022
- Owner: Onni Group

Height
- Architectural: Boren Tower: 425 ft (130 m); Fairview Tower: 415 ft (126 m)
- Top floor: Boren Tower: 400 ft (120 m); Fairview Tower: 400 ft (120 m)

Technical details
- Floor count: Boren Tower: 41; Fairview Tower: 41

Design and construction
- Architecture firm: Chris Dikeakos Architects
- Developer: Onni Group
- Structural engineer: Glotman Simpson Consulting Engineers

Other information
- Number of units: 827 apartments 272 hotel rooms
- Parking: 1,461 spaces

Onni South Lake Union (Onni SLU), also known as 1120 Denny Way, is a complex of two high-rise residential buildings and a hotel in South Lake Union, Seattle, Washington, United States. The residential buildings—both be 41 stories tall—comprise a total of 827 apartments. They are connected by a 12-story hotel with retail and amenity space. 1120 Denny Way was developed by Onni Group, which is also redeveloping the adjacent Seattle Times Building site. The project began construction in 2017 and was completed in 2022.

== History ==
The Seattle Times Company acquired much of its property in the late 1920s, prior to the construction of its headquarters building in 1931. The lot immediately south of the headquarters, facing Denny Way, was converted into a parking lot with a small park at its northeast corner. The company sought to redevelop the lot into a new office building in the 1990s, as part of a cancelled expansion project. The Times Company put the parking lot up for sale in 2011, as part of its plans to sell its headquarters to private developers.

In July 2013, The Times Company announced that it had sold the block, along with the adjoining headquarters, to Onni Group for $62.5 million. The following year, Onni submitted designs for a four-tower project with 1,950 residential units on the two blocks, including a pair of 40-story towers on the Denny block. The proposal included removal of the Seattle Times Park, which sparked outcry from nearby residents and local preservationist Peter Steinbrueck. A revised plan to preserve the park was approved in July 2014, in exchange for raised building heights on the north block. The project was approved in 2016 and began construction in early 2017. It was scheduled to be completed in 2020. By May 2020, the project was 15 months behind schedule due to a reconfiguration of the penthouses and the effects of the COVID-19 pandemic.

The residential portion opened in May 2022 as Onni South Lake Union. The hotel portion, named Level South Lake Union, opened a month later with 272 rooms furnished similar to apartments for extended stays. The complex also has three swimming pools, a fitness center, and space for a grocery store and restaurants. By October 2023, 95% of units in the residential portion were leased with monthly rents that ranged from $2,450 to $40,058.

The rooftop deck was the venue for a party with DJ Paris Hilton in September 2025 that generated noise and light complaints from the surrounding area.

== Design ==
Onni SLU is one of the largest residential projects to be constructed in the city's history. The complex includes a 41-story, 425-foot-tall (130 m) tower on the northwest corner of the block, facing Boren Avenue and John Street; a 41-story, 415-foot-tall (126 m) tower on the southeast corner, facing Denny Way and Fairview Avenue; and a 12-story hotel podium on the southwest corner, facing Denny Way and Boren Avenue. The northeast corner is the historic Seattle Times Park, which was expanded to accommodate new public spaces around the project.

The three buildings comprise a total of 827 apartments and 272 hotel units; they were designed to be convertible into condominiums. The complex also has 28,000 square feet (2,600 m^{2}) of retail space and 1,461 underground parking spaces. The podium includes multiple landscaped rooftop decks, as well as two outdoor swimming pools, garden spaces, a solarium, and a children's play area. The podium's exterior incorporates historic headlines from The Seattle Times etched into the façade between floors. Early proposals for the complex included the use of a district heating system to save energy.
