= Aspira (building) =

400-foot-tall skyscraper in the Denny Triangle neighborhood of Seattle, Washington

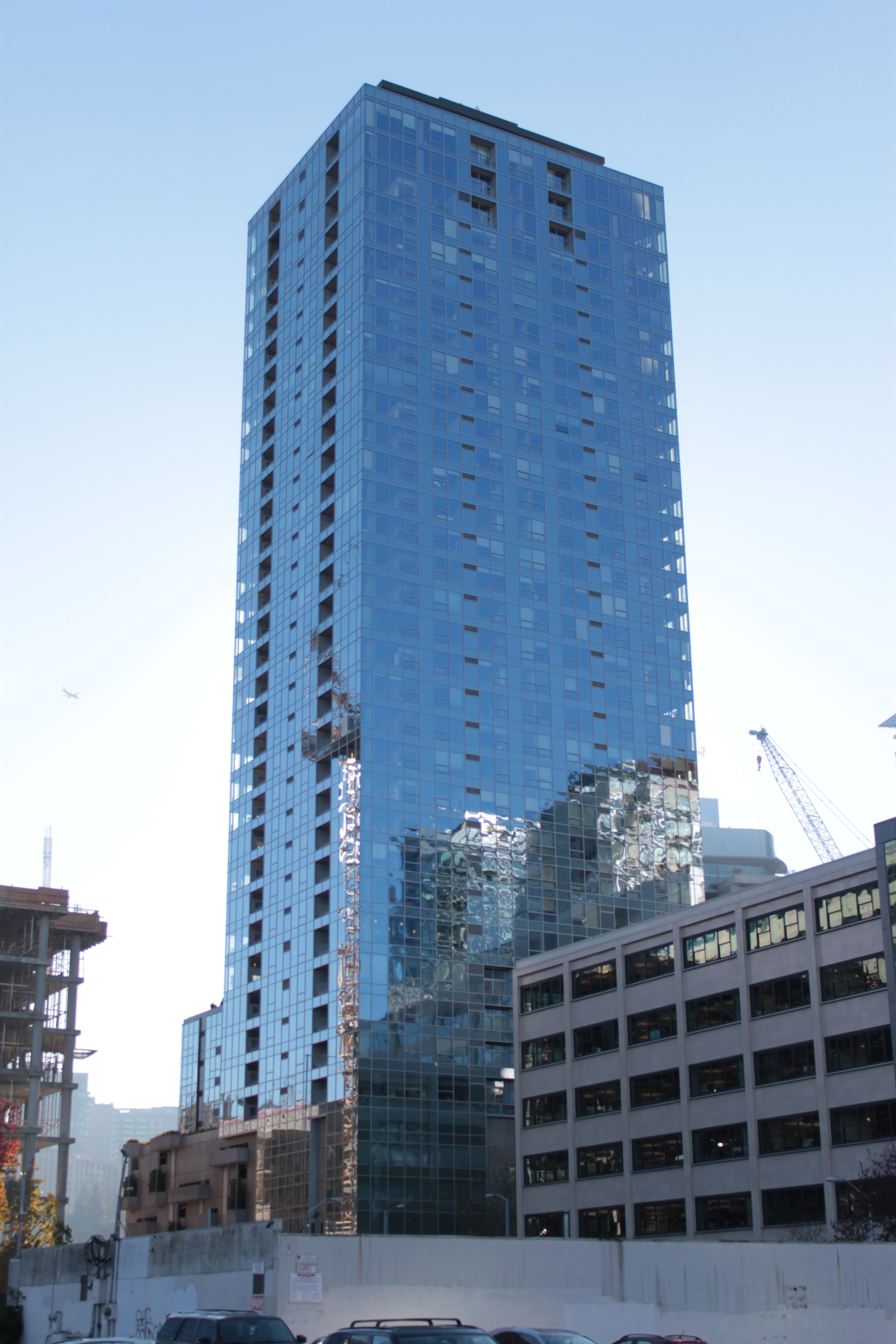
- Viewed from Virginia Street and Boren Avenue

- Location within downtown Seattle

General information
- Status: Completed
- Type: Retail/Residential
- Location: Seattle, Washington, 1823 Terry Avenue
- Coordinates: 47.616047°N 122.333473°W
- Construction started: 2007
- Completed: 2009
- Opening: March 2010
- Owner: TIAA

Height
- Roof: 400 ft (122 m)

Technical details
- Floor count: 37
- Floor area: 346,000 sq ft (32,100 m^{2})
- Lifts/elevators: 3

Design and construction
- Architect: LMN Architects
- Developer: Urban Partners
- Main contractor: Turner Construction

Other information
- Number of units: 325

Aspira is a 400-foot-tall (122 m) skyscraper in the Denny Triangle neighborhood of Seattle, Washington. It has 37 floors, and mostly consists of apartments, of which there are 325 units. Parking spaces total 355. Construction began in 2007 and was completed in late 2009. The building is located on Stewart Street at Terry Avenue.

== History ==
Urban Partners first proposed a 37-story residential and retail tower on the parking lot of the Gethsemane Lutheran Church, located south of the intersection of Stewart Street and Terry Avenue, in July 2006.

Construction on the tower began in 2007. The project was completed in late 2009 and opened to tenants in March 2010.

Aspira was originally intended to be a luxury condo building, but it was changed into an apartment rental building due to market conditions in 2009. At launch, the apartments in Aspira were significantly better than average Seattle apartments at the time, featuring concrete floors, air conditioning, private balconies, and large panoramic windows.

In November 2012, the tower was sold to TIAA-CREF for $165.7 million, setting a new regional record with a per-unit price of $509,760.

== See also ==
- List of tallest buildings in Seattle
