= JPMorganChase Center =

42-floor skyscraper in Seattle, Washington

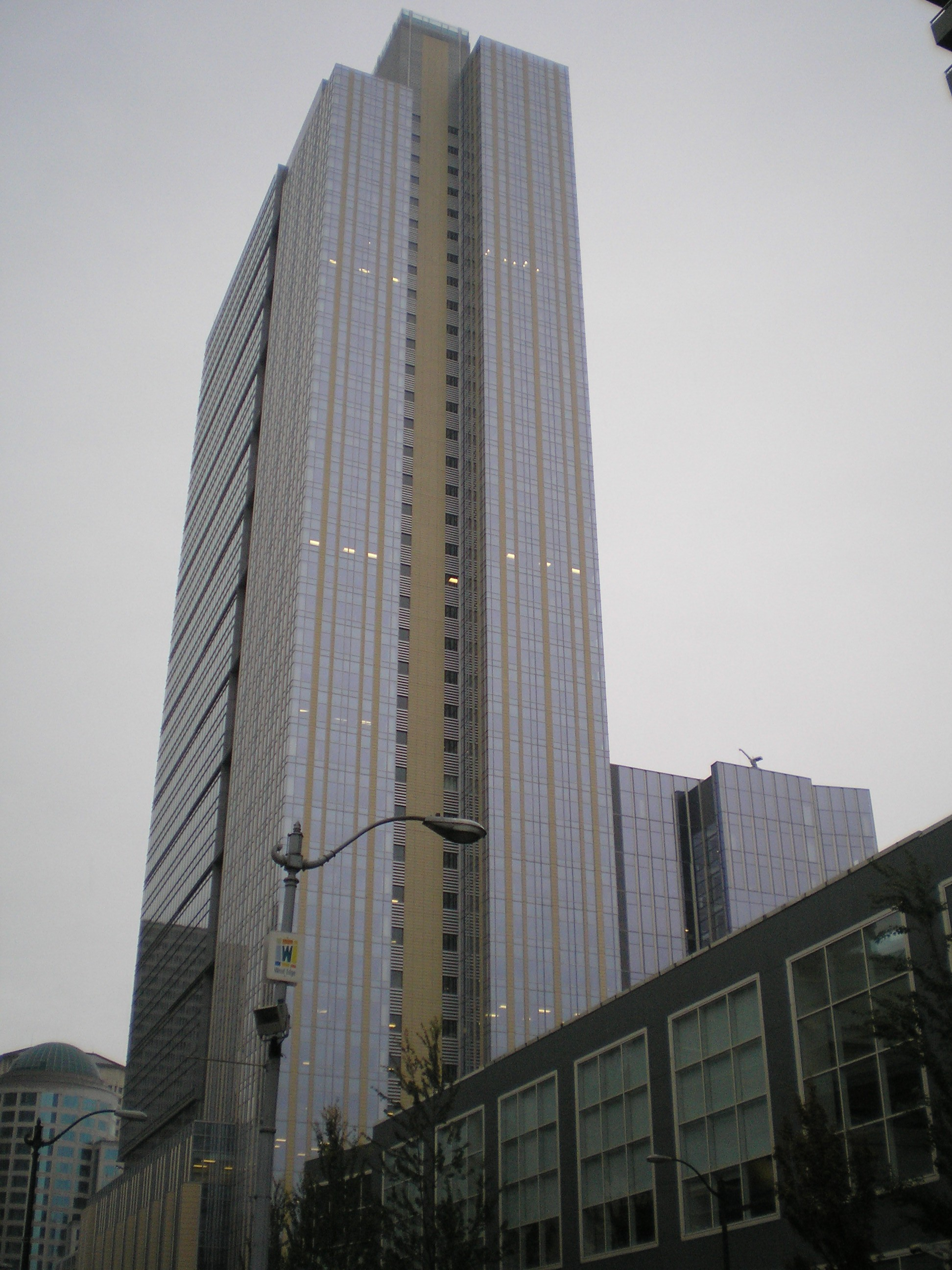
- JPMorganChase Center (then WaMu Center) in 2006

- Location within Downtown Seattle
- Former names: Russell Investments Center; Chase Center; WaMu Center; Washington Mutual Center

General information
- Type: Commercial offices
- Location: 1301 Second Avenue; Seattle, Washington, U.S.
- Coordinates: 47.607311°N 122.337109°W
- Construction started: 2004
- Completed: 2006
- Cost: US$370 million
- Owner: CommonWealth Partners, CalPERS
- Operator: CommonWealth Partners

Height
- Roof: 182.18 m (597.7 ft)

Technical details
- Floor count: 42
- Floor area: 87,300 m^{2} (940,000 sq ft)
- Lifts/elevators: 35

Design and construction
- Architect: NBBJ
- Developer: Pine Street Group LLC
- Structural engineer: Magnusson Klemencic Associates
- Main contractor: Sellen Construction

JPMorganChase Center is a 42-floor skyscraper in Seattle, Washington, United States. It is the ninth tallest building in Seattle at 182.18 m (597.7 ft), and on completion was the largest skyscraper to mark the downtown skyline in nearly 15 years.

The skyscraper was originally named WaMu Center because it was built to become the new headquarters for Washington Mutual (WaMu), which intended to move most of its many Seattle-area workers into one tower, streamline operations, and encourage worker interaction, with a reinvention of the workplace. Major construction ended in early 2006, with minor construction continuing into the fall. Tenants from Washington Mutual began to move into the tower in March that year. On September 25, 2008, Washington Mutual failed, and its assets and accounts were sold to JPMorgan Chase by the Federal Deposit Insurance Corporation. On June 1, 2009, the building was renamed Chase Center. On September 9, 2009, the building was purchased by Northwestern Mutual of Milwaukee. Russell Investments, a Northwestern Mutual subsidiary, made the building its corporate headquarters upon relocation from Tacoma, Washington, and renamed the building the Russell Investments Center.

The architect for the tower was NBBJ, which also designed nearby Two Union Square and other notable buildings in downtown Seattle. Sellen Construction was the general contractor for the project. The tower is located at 1301 Second Avenue, on the opposite corner from 1201 Third Avenue that was previously named Washington Mutual Tower. It includes the Seattle Art Museum (SAM) on the first four floors of the west half of the building, and connects to the museum's existing building on the southern portion of the block. WaMu and SAM made an agreement where the museum may expand in two-floor increments up to the 12th floor over the next 20 years as needed.

The building also features a private 20,000 sq ft (1,900 m^{2}) rooftop patio on the west half of the 17th floor for workers of the tower to take walks along the several walking paths. The west facade of the Russell Investments Center displays a "12" during Seattle Seahawks games—a reference to the team's 12th man—by opening certain window shades. The display was first used in 2006 prior to Super Bowl XL and became a regular feature in 2014, shortly before the team's Super Bowl XLVIII title.

In July 2024, Russell Investments confirmed their plans to move their headquarters to the Rainier Square Tower. A naming rights agreement was signed with JPMorgan Chase concurrent with an expansion of their leased space in the building by 40,000 square feet (3,700 m^{2}), to 128,000 square feet (11,900 m^{2}) across five floors. Signage began to be installed in January 2026.

== Tenants ==
- Seattle Art Museum
- Nordstrom
- Oracle
- Zillow (HQ)
- Indeed, Inc.
- JPMorgan Chase & Co.
- Perkins Coie (subleased from Zillow beginning in 2025)
- Ballard Spahr (merged with Lane Powell in 2025)
The 17th floor garden roof viewed from the 43rd floor roof.
