= Sellen Construction =

Seattle, Washington-based construction firm

- Type: Private
- Industry: Construction
- Founded: 1944; 82 years ago, Seattle, Washington
- Headquarters: Seattle, Washington, U.S.
- Website: www.sellen.com

Sellen Construction is a Seattle, Washington-based construction firm. Its clients have included Microsoft, Amazon.com, AT&T, Russell Investments, The Bill and Melinda Gates Foundation, Seattle Children's Hospital, and Vulcan Inc.

== History ==
Sellen has operated continuously as a general contractor since its founding in 1944 in the South Lake Union neighborhood of Seattle by John H. Sellen. Today, Sellen Construction is one of the largest commercial builders in the Pacific Northwest building projects in commercial office, healthcare, life science, and arts and non-profit sectors.

== Notable projects ==
- Amazon.com Headquarters - Denny Triangle Seattle
- Amazon.com Bellevue 600
- Seattle Spheres
- Microsoft Campus Renovation
- Seattle Children's Hospital - Additions and Renovations
- MOHAI Renovation
- The Bill and Melinda Gates Foundation Campus
- WaMu Tower/Seattle Art Museum Expansion (Russell Investments Center)
- Pike Place Market, MarketFront Expansion
- 1918 Eighth Avenue
- Russell Investment Headquarters
- Seattle Art Museum's Olympic Sculpture Park
- Seattle Children's Hospital
- 2201 Westlake/ Enso
- International Fountain at Seattle Center
- Red Square Quadrangle - University of Washington
- Fairmont Olympic Hotel
- Century Square
- U.S. Bank Center (Pacific First Center)
- Microsoft Redmond West
- ACT Theater (Seattle)
- Swedish Medical Center, First Hill, Cherry Hill
- Pacific Place
- Key Center, Bellevue
- Fisher Plaza
- Watermark Tower
