= Insignia Towers =

Residential buildings in Washington state, US

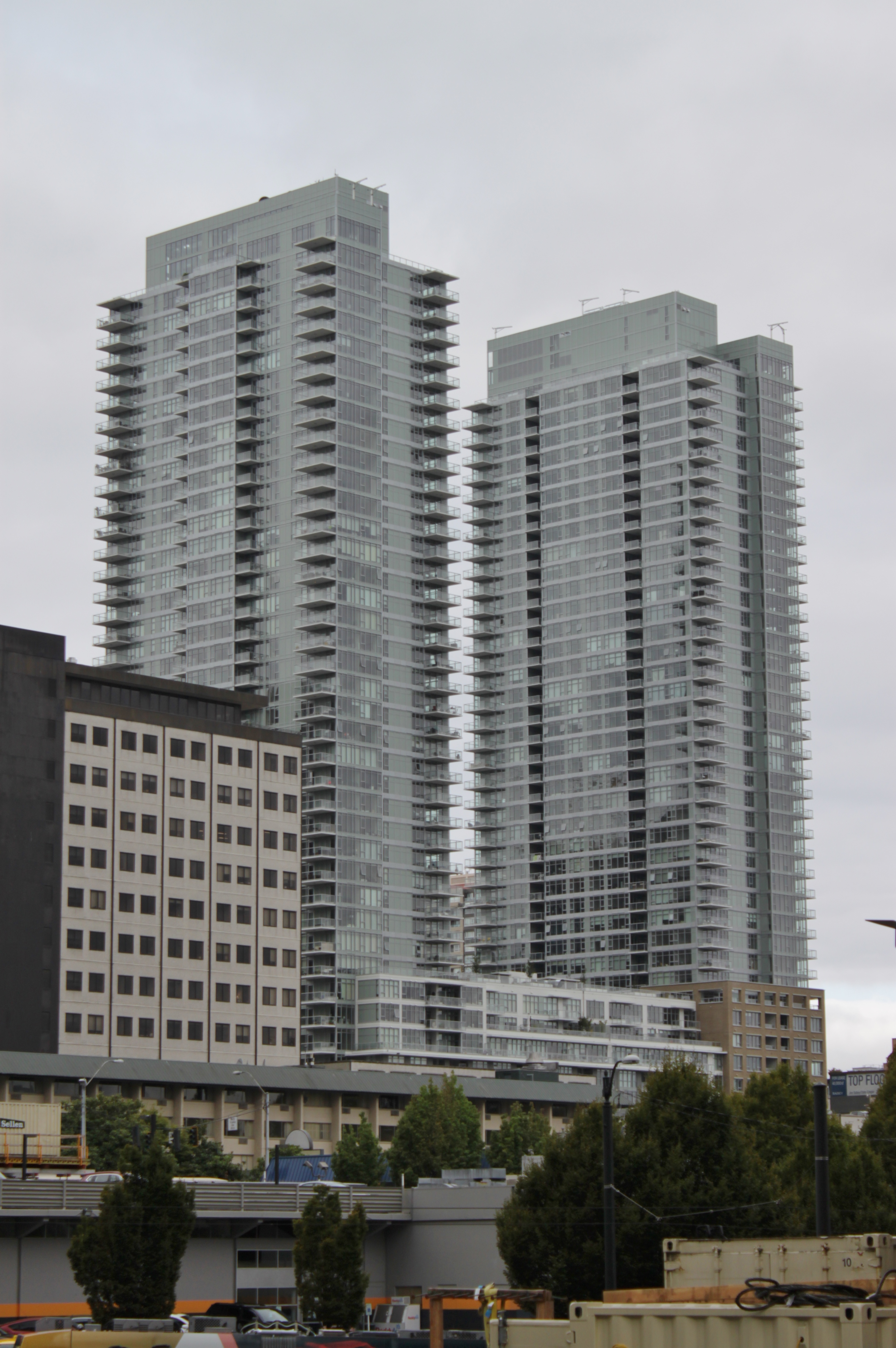
- Insignia Towers seen in August 2016

- Location within downtown Seattle
- Former names: Embassy Development Project
- Alternative names: 2301 6th Avenue

General information
- Status: Completed
- Location: 588 Bell Street; Seattle, Washington
- Coordinates: 47°37′01″N 122°20′36″W
- Construction started: 2012
- Completed: 2015–2016

Height
- Roof: 441 feet (134 m)
- Top floor: 400 feet (120 m)

Technical details
- Floor count: 41

Other information
- Number of units: 698 condominiums

Website
- insigniacondos.com

The Insignia Towers are a pair of 41-story residential skyscrapers on a shared podium in the Denny Regrade neighborhood of Seattle, Washington, United States. The towers have a combined 698 condominiums and were developed by Canadian firm Bosa Development. The complex includes 36,000 square feet (3,300 m^{2}) of retail space, an underground parking garage with 900 stalls, and amenity areas for residents in both towers.

The Insignia project was announced by another developer, Vancouver-based Embassy Development, in 2006 with a design of two towers by Perkins & Company. The full city block was acquired in 2007 from Clise Properties for $49.9 million. The 440-foot (130 m) condominium towers were planned to include sustainable features, such as heat pumps, and received planning approval from the city government and planned to begin construction in 2008. Embassy paused work on Insignia due to the late-2000s recession and later sold its stake in the project to Bosa Development, which announced plans to restart work in 2012 after market conditions had improved. Amazon had begun construction of their new headquarters campus nearby, which triggered new interest in condominium development in the Denny Regrade.

The project was the largest post-recession residential development in Seattle and cost an estimated $450 million. Construction of the complex's south tower began in June 2012, with plans to complete the foundation and underground portions for both towers but leave the north tower for a later phase. Preliminary work on the north tower began in September 2013. The south tower topped out in August 2014 and was finished in July 2015. The north tower was completed in 2016, with three units in the entire complex still for sale. The final unit, a two-bedroom penthouse, was sold in March 2017.
