= The Ayer =

Residential high-rise building in Seattle, Washington

- Location within Downtown Seattle

General information
- Status: Completed
- Type: Residential, Retail
- Location: 2010 Terry Avenue; 1000 Virginia Street; Seattle, Washington, United States
- Coordinates: 47°37′02″N 122°20′07″W
- Groundbreaking: Summer 2020
- Construction started: 2020
- Completed: 2023
- Opened: December 2023
- Owner: Holland Partner Group; North America Sekisui House

Height
- Height: 484 feet (148 m)

Technical details
- Floor count: 45
- Floor area: 575,380 sq ft (53,455 m^{2})

Design and construction
- Architecture firm: Weber Thompson
- Developer: Holland Partner Group; North America Sekisui House
- Awards: 2024 NAIOP High-Rise Residential Development of the Year

Other information
- Number of units: 454 apartments
- Parking: 245 parking stalls (6 levels underground)

Website
- www.hollandresidential.com/wa/seattle/the-ayer/

The Ayer is a residential high-rise building in Seattle, Washington. The 45-story skyscraper, located in the Denny Triangle neighborhood, was completed in 2023 with 454 luxury apartments and ground-floor retail space. The building is named after Elizabeth Ayer (1897–1987), the first woman to graduate from the University of Washington architecture program and the first woman licensed as an architect in Washington State.

The Ayer shares a city block with its sister building, The Ivey on Boren, another Holland Partner Group development. Both projects were designed by Weber Thompson to support Cornish College of the Arts while providing luxury urban living in Seattle's rapidly growing South Lake Union area.

== History ==
Holland Partner Group, in partnership with North America Sekisui House (NASH), purchased the 14,400-square-foot (1,340 m^{2}) property at 1000 Virginia Street from Cornish College of the Arts in 2019 for $22 million. The site previously housed Cornish's Centennial Labs building, a small college facility that was removed for the development.

Construction began in summer 2020. A related NASH entity provided a $205 million construction loan for the project.

The city issued a temporary certificate of occupancy at the end of December 2023, initially covering the garage and levels one through 30. Leasing began in early January 2024, with the building opening to residents in February 2024.

== Design ==
The Ayer was designed by Weber Thompson, the same Seattle architecture firm that designed its sister building The Ivey on Boren, as well as nearby towers Stratus and Cirrus. The 484-foot (148 m) tower features 45 stories above ground and six levels of subterranean parking.

=== Architectural concept ===
The design was inspired by the natural tectonics of the Pacific Northwest, where geological forces have sheered and fractured rock formations. The façade features geometric patterning and interlocking cubes creating a "jenga shape" that gives the tower visual energy. The seams of the tower contrast its reflective glass shell, revealing what appears as the pure, unweathered interior similar to natural stone formations.

At grade level, the building features an urban reinterpretation of a traditional porch, set far back from the street The landscaping draws on Pacific Northwest native forests with dark green tones, copper accents, and curved linear benches creating a pocket park with natural stone, wood, precast concrete, and polished bronze accents.

=== Structural engineering ===
The Ayer's structure consists of cast-in-place concrete with post-tensioned floor slabs and a shear wall core for seismic and wind resistance. Cary Kopczynski & Co. used non-linear analysis and Performance Based Design to develop a seismic system with a single concrete shear wall core throughout the building's height. The coupling beams utilize innovative steel fiber reinforcing, eliminating the need for diagonal reinforcing and accelerating construction while reducing costs.

The gravity system utilizes long-span, 8-inch-thick post-tensioned flat plate slabs with perimeter cantilevers extending up to 12 feet (3.7 m) on the east side. This resulted in only 16 columns with zero transfer conditions, allowing for fewer columns, optimized slab-bending moments, and reduced floor-to-floor heights. The structure uses 15,000 psi (100,000 kPa) concrete in the columns to maximize unit space and layout flexibility.

=== Public art ===
The Ayer features a neon artwork titled "Nocturnal Flight" by Seattle artist Yale Wolf, commissioned by Holland Partner Group in collaboration with Urban ArtWorks. The piece honors Weber Thompson founding partner Blaine Weber (1952–2023), reflecting his "night owl spirit" and love for Seattle. Blaine Weber retired in March 2022 after 35 years with the firm and The Ayer was his final Seattle high-rise project.

== Facilities ==
=== Residential ===
The Ayer contains 454 apartment units ranging from studios to three-bedroom layouts, with penthouse units on the upper floors. Units range from 457 to 2,471 sq ft (42.5 to 229.6 m^{2}). The residential portion comprises 359,412 sq ft (33,390.5 m^{2}) of the building's total 575,380 sq ft (53,455 m^{2}).

Amenities include a rooftop deck on the 46th level with an adjoining sky lounge, fitness center, private work pods and conference rooms, pet spa and dog park, and multiple game rooms and lounges. Rooftop amenities are surrounded by custom-built walls clad in natural stone, providing protection from the elements while continuing the forest-inspired materials palette from the ground level.

=== Retail ===
The building includes approximately 1,000 sq ft (93 m^{2}) of ground-floor retail space. A retail bay on the corner offers 1,035 sq ft (96.2 m^{2}). Voxx Coffee occupies space adjoining the lobby.

=== Parking ===
The building has six levels of underground parking with approximately 245–261 stalls, some equipped with electric vehicle charging stations.

== Awards ==
The Ayer received the 2024 NAIOP Washington State Night of the Stars award for High-Rise Residential Development of the Year.

== See also ==
- List of tallest buildings in Seattle
- The Ivey on Boren
- Cornish College of the Arts
