= The Ivey on Boren =

Residential high-rise building in Seattle, Washington

- Location within Downtown Seattle

General information
- Status: Completed
- Type: Residential, Office, Arts facilities
- Location: 2019 Boren Avenue; Seattle, Washington, United States
- Coordinates: 47°37′05″N 122°20′07″W
- Groundbreaking: September 2019
- Construction started: 2019
- Completed: 2022
- Opened: October 2022
- Owner: Sekisui House REIT

Height
- Height: 475 feet (145 m)

Technical details
- Floor count: 44
- Floor area: 643,350 sq ft (59,769 m^{2})

Design and construction
- Architecture firm: Weber Thompson
- Developer: Holland Partner Group; North America Sekisui House
- Awards: 2023 NAIOP High-Rise Residential Development of the Year

Other information
- Number of units: 406 apartments
- Parking: 370 parking stalls

Website
- https://www.hollandresidential.com/wa/seattle/the-ivey-on-boren

The Ivey on Boren is a residential high-rise building in Seattle, Washington. The 44-story skyscraper, located in the Denny Triangle neighborhood at the border of South Lake Union, was completed in 2022. The building contains 406 luxury apartments, 53,567 sq ft (4,976.5 m^{2}) of office space, and 7,785 sq ft (723.3 m^{2}) of arts facilities operated by Cornish College of the Arts.

The building is named after William Ivey (1919–1992), a celebrated Seattle abstract expressionist painter and alumnus of Cornish College of the Arts. The design emphasizes wellness and incorporates organic themes throughout, with ground-level art galleries and performance spaces that serve as a public-facing arts hub for Cornish.

== History ==
Holland Partner Group, in partnership with North America Sekisui House (NASH), acquired the site at 2019 Boren Avenue from Cornish College of the Arts. The developers broke ground on the 44-story residential tower in September 2019.

Construction was completed in 2022, with the building receiving its temporary certificate of occupancy in August 2022. Leasing began in fall 2022.

In May 2024, the property was sold to Sekisui House REIT for $328 million, marking the REIT's first property acquisition outside of Japan.

== Design ==
The Ivey on Boren was designed by Weber Thompson, the same architecture firm that designed the neighboring Stratus and Cirrus buildings, as well as the adjacent Ayer tower. The 475-foot (145 m) tower features vertically oriented extrusions and window wall glazing with mixed patterns and materials creating visual movement in the building's massing.

The building's design philosophy emphasizes the fluidity of art and nature, with organic themes incorporated throughout the interior and exterior spaces. The design team set the podium back from the property line to minimize impact on Cornish's historic Raisbeck Performance Hall, which sits adjacent to the site.

=== Namesake ===
The building is named after William Ivey (1919–1992), a prominent Seattle abstract expressionist painter associated with the Northwest School. Ivey studied drawing at Cornish School (now Cornish College of the Arts) in the 1930s before serving in World War II. He later studied under Clyfford Still and Mark Rothko at the California School of Fine Arts and became known for his lush, color-focused abstract paintings. Seattle Times critic Deloris Tarzan Ament described him as "the Dean of Northwest Painters."

== Facilities ==
=== Residential ===
The Ivey on Boren offers 406 apartment units ranging from studios to three-bedroom layouts, including penthouse units on the upper floors. Units range in size from 520 to 2,342 sq ft (48.3 to 217.6 m^{2}). The residential portion comprises 344,372 sq ft (31,993.2 m^{2}) of the building's total 643,350 sq ft (59,769 m^{2}).

Resident amenities include an entire wellness floor featuring a pool, hot tub, and fitness center. The podium terrace includes two soaking pools—a cold plunge and hot tub—designed to provide contrast therapy. The rooftop terrace features a sky lounge and grilling stations with views of Lake Union, the Space Needle, Elliott Bay, and downtown Seattle. Additional amenities include a lobby with concierge service and coffee bar.

=== Cornish College of the Arts facilities ===
The ground floor contains 7,785 sq ft (723.3 m^{2}) of arts facilities for Cornish College of the Arts, including a 177-seat auditorium equipped with a Meyer Sound Constellation acoustic system, digital cinema projector, and streaming capabilities for global broadcasts. An adjacent street-level art gallery provides exhibition space for student, faculty, and alumni work.

The building features an exterior art wall along Lenora Street, integrated into the building's façade using matching materials and patterns. This flexible installation space is set back behind a landscaped terrace that can accommodate public gatherings and outdoor performances by Cornish students. These facilities are referred to as the "Boren + Lenora Project" by Cornish and represent the college's first major public-facing performance and gallery space in the South Lake Union area.

=== Office space ===
The building includes 53,567 sq ft (4,976.5 m^{2}) of commercial office space on multiple floors.

== Sustainability ==
The Ivey on Boren achieved LEED Gold certification and Fitwel 1-Star certification for health and wellness.

The building treats over 374,000 gallons of stormwater annually through 1,100 sq ft (100 m^{2}) of bioretention planters that filter water through transpiration and filtration. This system reduces pollution, heavy metals, and stormwater volume entering municipal systems while improving water quality in local salmon habitats.

== Awards ==
The Ivey on Boren received the 2023 NAIOP Washington State Night of the Stars award for High-Rise Residential Development of the Year.

== See also ==
- List of tallest buildings in Seattle
- Cornish College of the Arts
