= Eitel Building =

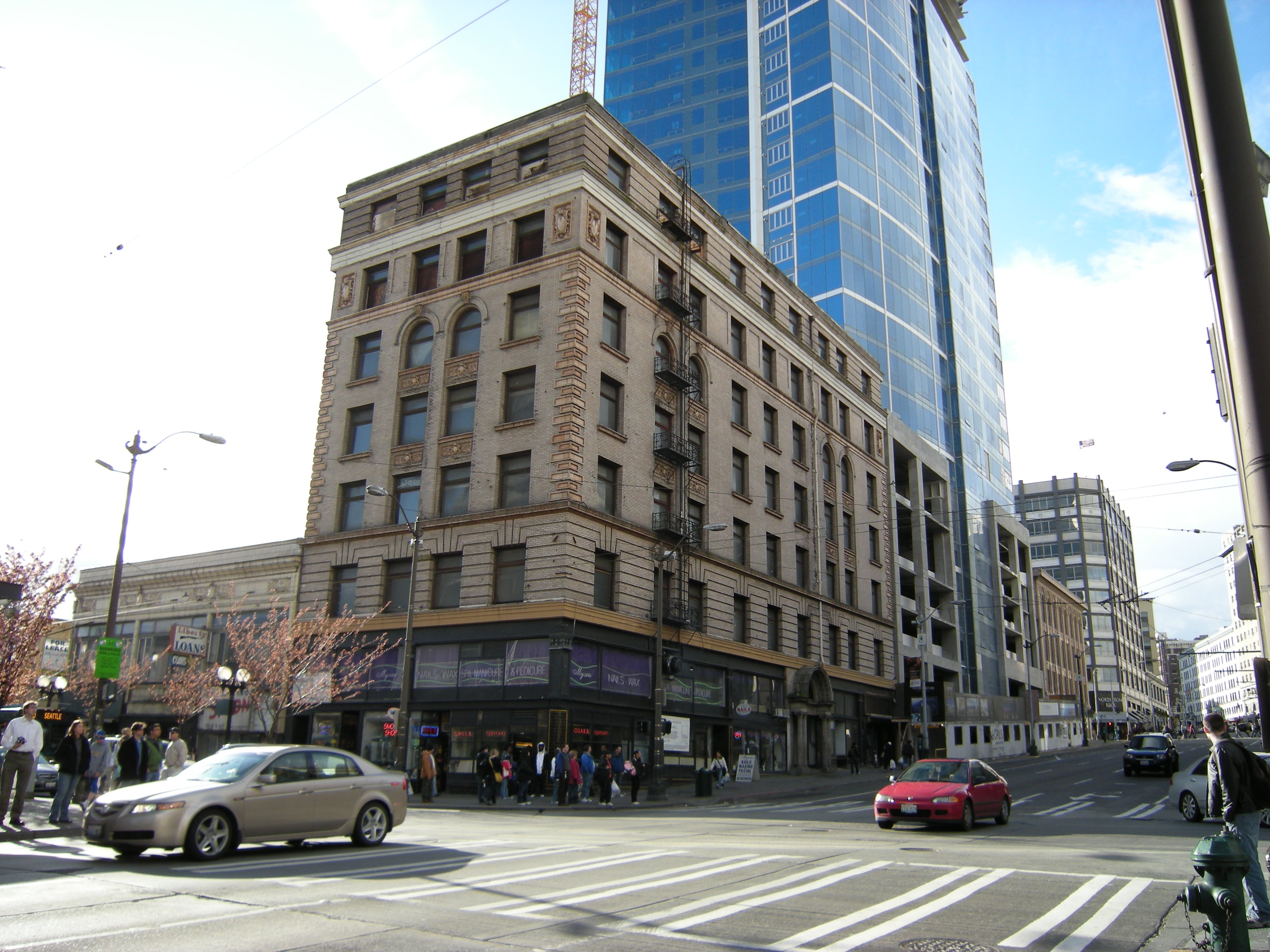
- The Eitel Building, in 2008
- Interactive map of the Eitel Building area

General information
- Status: Completed
- Location: 1501 2nd Avenue; Seattle, Washington
- Coordinates: 47°36′34″N 122°20′22″W
- Construction started: 1904
- Completed: 1905
- Renovated: 2017–2019
- Renovation cost: $16 million

Height
- Height: 90 feet (27 m)

Technical details
- Floor count: 8
- Floor area: 45,000 square feet (4,200 m^{2})

Design and construction
- Architect: William Doty van Siclen
- Developer: David and Fred Eitel

Renovating team
- Renovating firm: Weinstein A+U
- Structural engineer: Coughlin Porter Lundeen
- Main contractor: Exxel Pacific

Other information
- Number of rooms: 90

Seattle Landmark
- Designated: January 31, 2011

The Eitel Building is an eight-story hotel building at the corner of Pike Street and 2nd Avenue in Downtown Seattle, Washington, United States. Originally built by the Eitel Brothers in 1904 to house medical offices, the building had been mostly vacant since the 1970s and described as an eyesore. In 2016, after several attempted purchases by local developers, the Eitel Building was sold to a development company that announced its intent to convert the building into a boutique hotel. The hotel renovation, which also added the eighth floor, cost $16 million and was completed in early 2019.

== History ==
In February 1904, developers David and Fred Eitel announced their intention to build a six-story, steel framed building at the intersection of 2nd Avenue and Pike Street in Seattle's then-developing northern business district. The building's upper floors would house 95 offices for medical practitioners and pharmacists, while the ground floor would be divided into two retail stores. Construction began in April 1904, and was completed in January 1905, at a cost of $80,000. The Eitel Building's terra cotta exterior, designed by architect William Doty van Siclen, was hailed as the centerpiece of one of the city's finest buildings; the building also boasted modern features such as concrete flooring and the largest passenger elevator in the Pacific Northwest. The Eitel Brothers sold the building to the J. A. Livesley Company on March 7, 1906, who added a seventh floor to the building later that year.

As the 1st Avenue area declined in the 1940s and 1950s, the Eitel Building lost its ground-level retail tenants and was sold to various investment groups. The building's office tenants slowly left, leaving the upper floors completely unoccupied by 1978, as renovation to modern building code standards became too costly for landlords. Real estate investor Richard Nimmer bought the property in 1975, and pursued several unsuccessful attempts at renovating and selling the Eitel Building for various uses, including apartments, offices, and a hotel. The Eitel Building became regarded as an "eyesore", owing to its highly trafficked location near Pike Place Market, with boarded windows, a rotting roof, and a pigeon infestation. At one point, the city of Seattle threatened to condemn the property as part of their efforts to clean up the area. The building also suffered damage during the 2001 Nisqually earthquake, including the separation of a brick wall from the roof, which was repaired but dissuaded potential buyers.

After the rezoning of the downtown area and development of the 400-foot (120 m) Fifteen Twenty-One Second Avenue to the immediate north of the Eitel Building in 2006, Nimmer sought to build a 22-story tower on top of the existing building. The proposal drew the ire of condominium owners in Fifteen Twenty-One Second Avenue, who would lose their views if the tower was built, and preservationist groups that sought a landmark designation for the building. The landmark designation was granted by the Landmarks Preservation Board in 2006, but not approved by the Seattle City Council until the dispute between Nimmer and the condominium owners was settled in 2011.

The Eitel Building was put up for sale in 2011, with an asking price of $4.85 million. The following year, Ariel Development agreed to buy the building and announced plants to convert it into an 80-room boutique hotel. The firm backed out of the contract in late 2012, citing the high cost of the property and renovations. In 2013, developer Greg Smith of Urban Visions signed a contract to buy the building, but also backed out over the property's cost. The building was sold to Lake Union Partners for $5.35 million in November 2015, ending Nimmer's ownership, and plans for a $25 million boutique hotel renovation were announced. The renovation will convert the building into a 90-room hotel, adding an eighth floor, completing seismic upgrades, and refinishing the terra cotta exterior. The hotel, branded as the State Hotel and operated by Columbia Hospitality, opened in early 2019. The State Hotel also has a ground-floor bar named for sportsman and former tenant Ben Paris.
