= William Charlie Horton =

United States Marine Corps Medal of Honor recipient

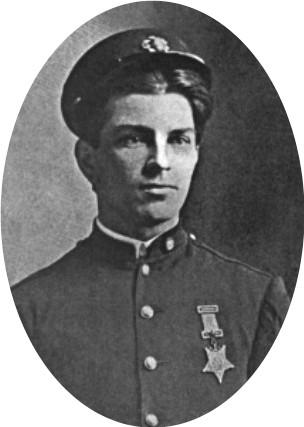
- William Horton wearing his Medal of Honor
- Born: July 21, 1876; Chicago, Illinois, US
- Died: February 14, 1969 (aged 92); Seattle, Washington, US
- Burial place: Evergreen-Washelli Cemetery; Seattle, Washington
- Military career
- Allegiance: United States
- Branch: United States Marine Corps
- Rank: Private
- Conflicts: Boxer Rebellion; Siege of the International Legations
- Awards: Medal of Honor

William Charlie Horton (July 21, 1876 – February 14, 1969) was a United States Marine and a recipient of the United States military's highest decoration, the Medal of Honor, for his actions during the Boxer Rebellion.

Horton served in the American Chinese Relief Expedition during the Boxer Rebellion as a private in the U.S. Marine Corps. He was awarded the Medal of Honor for his actions at Peking, China.

His Medal was issued on July 19, 1901. He is buried at Evergreen-Washelli Cemetery in Seattle, Washington.

== Medal of Honor citation ==
Rank and organization: Private, U.S. Marine Corps. Place and date: Peking, China, July 21, to August 17, 1900. Entered service at: Pennsylvania. Born: July 21, 1876, Chicago, Ill. G.O. No.: 55, July 19, 1901.

Citation:

In action against the enemy at Peking, China, July 21, to August 17, 1900. Although under heavy fire from the enemy, Horton assisted in the erection of barricades.

== See also ==
- List of Medal of Honor recipients
- List of Medal of Honor recipients for the Boxer Rebellion
