= Ben Paris =

Ben Paris Restaurant storefront

Benjamin M. Paris (July 15, 1884 – January 8, 1950) was an American sportsman, entrepreneur, conservationist, and owner of a landmark restaurant in Seattle, Washington. Paris founded the Seattle Ben Paris Salmon Derby. He is inurned at the columbarium at Evergreen Washelli Memorial Park.

== Life ==
Benjamin Paris was born in Birmingham, Alabama, on July 15, 1884. As a youth, he moved with his family to Texas, where he grew up with his four brothers and five sisters. His formal education ended when he completed third grade. His father died when Paris was fourteen or fifteen and his mother passed two years later. At the age of seventeen, Paris went to Mexico to work on a railroad construction project, which later brought him to Port Hope, Alaska. He came to Seattle for eighteen months before moving to Missouri, where he worked as an ironworker. In 1906, he was injured on the job, and thus prompted a permanent return to Seattle.

== Business ==
Paris received a $600 loan to start a five-table billiard parlor on Admiral Way in West Seattle. In 1912, he incorporated as the Ben Paris Terminal Concessions Company, of which he was president and general manager. By 1922, he owned four first-class billiard parlors, one at 912 1/2 First Avenue, one at 120 1/2 Pike Street, and one each in Bremerton and Mt. Vernon, totaling $80,000 in value; he also owned Ben Paris Cigars, Lunch & Cards in the Eitel Building at 1501 2nd Avenue. His establishments had the most modern equipment available at the time and catered to the upper-class men of the area, and the managers of his businesses each owned an interest in his company.

In the late 1920s, his company, along with Bartell Drugs, established a seventy-six year lease of the Eitel Building.

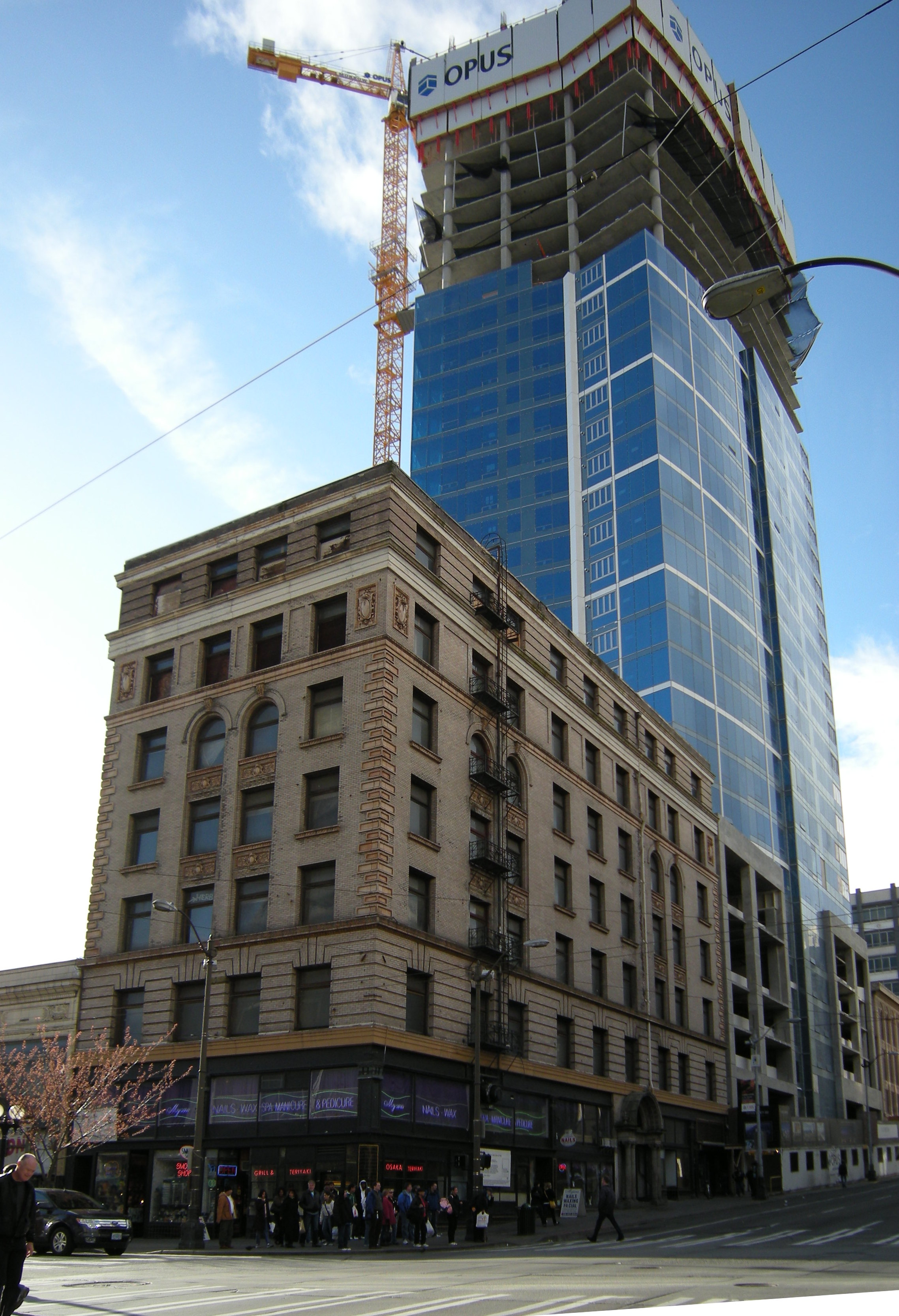
The Eitel Building, April 2008

In 1930, he established the Ben Paris Restaurant at 1609 Westlake Avenue. It featured more than food, with a barber shop and various shops catering to men where they could get clothes, fishing tackle and hunting rifles and more.

== Sportsmanship and conservation ==
Paris, who was an avid sportsman, also sold sporting goods at some of his establishments. In particular, he was an advocate for fishing and installed a large circular fish tank containing live bass in the lobby of at least one of his downtown Seattle restaurants. To help boost sales of his fishing rods, he started Seattle's first fishing derby in 1931. That year, the Washington Conservation League was formed to try to change the county-controlled gambling commission to one that was state-controlled. Paris was elected president of that committee. In less than eighteen months, Paris made two hundred and eleven appearances in support of Initiative 62, which voters passed in November 1932. He was subsequently appointed to the newly formed state game commission, but resigned after three months concentrate on his businesses. When Paris complained that commercial salmon traps were snaring all the fish before they could even reach Puget Sound or its tributaries, the state legislature took notice and, in 1935, outlawed commercial salmon traps in Puget Sound. As a bar owner, he didn't think that selling beer on Sundays should be illegal and in 1934, he took his argument to the Supreme Court and lost. In 1935, Paris began publishing the now-iconic Fishing (and Hunting) Guide to the Northwest which ran from 1935 to 1980. Paris was head of the Gander Club and was involved in several other conservation organizations, such as the Western Bass Club. He also was active in the Eagles, Knights, and Shriners, and sponsored semi-pro baseball teams.
