= Ben Fey =

Benjiman I. William Fey (June 4, 1874 – December 7, 1938) was an American movie theatre owner.

== Life ==
Benjiman Fey was born in Cincinnati, Ohio, where he later worked as a barkeeper and stock keeper. He married Lillie Huppert, who gave birth to their son, Erwin J. Fey, on August 13, 1900. By 1920, the family was living in Seattle, Washington and Fey was managing the Madison Theatre in the Capitol Hill, Seattle district at Madison and Broadway, where Erwin Fey also worked as a helper.

== Roxy Theatre ==
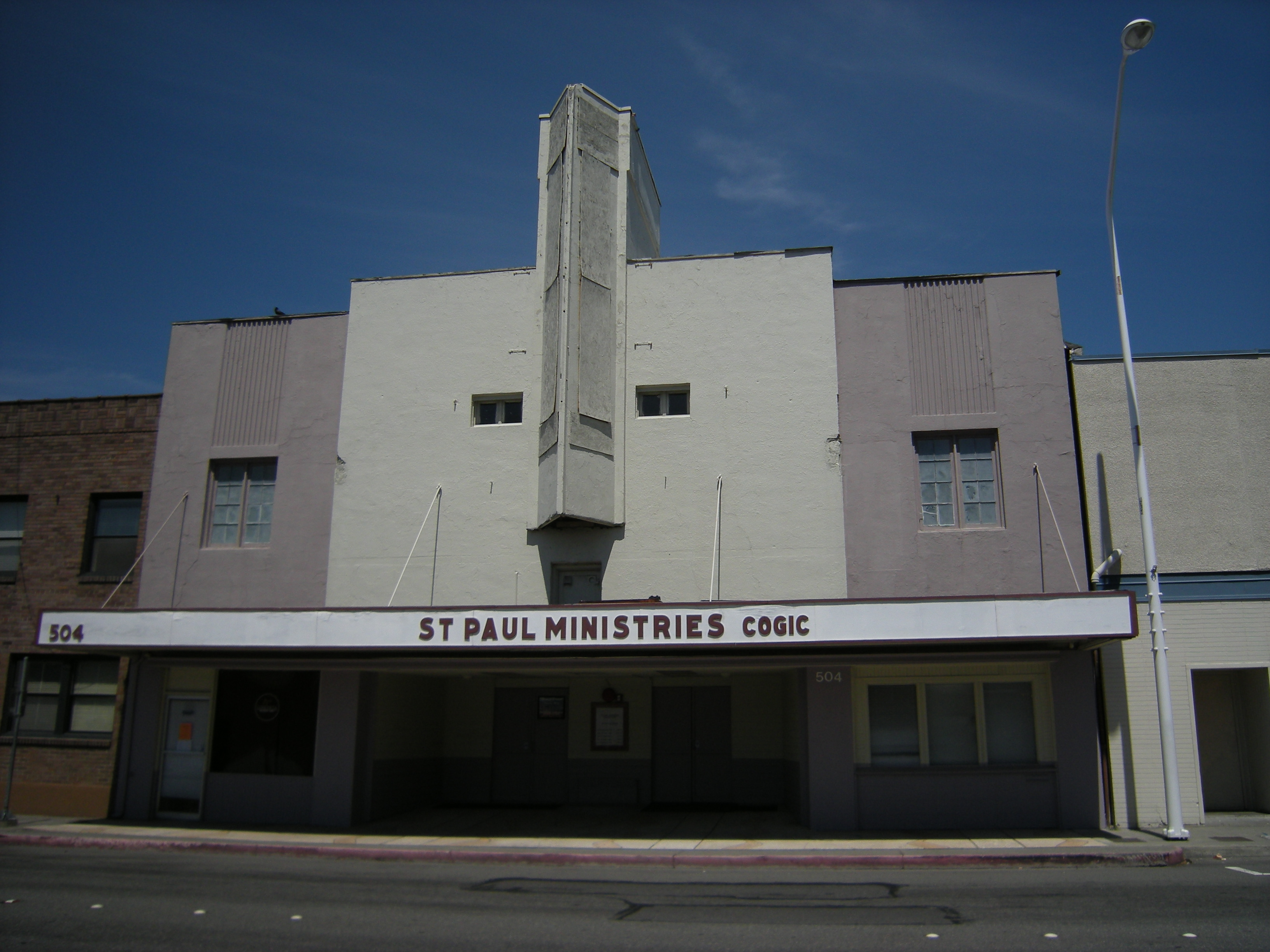
Roxy Theatre

In 1924, he sold his interest in the Madison and bought two theatres in Renton. The Roxy Theatre, located at 504 S. 3rd Street, was an art-deco landmark, with an eight-sided dome in the ceiling and staircases with sweeping chrome railings. Inside the auditorium were art-deco light fixtures in the shape of four-pointed stars, which were able to be dimmed and yet leave enough of a glow to outline the chrome stars on the ceiling. In the stairwells there were chandeliers of slim, stately milk glass columns with stacks of little chrome trumpets on top. In more recent years, the Roxy was reopened to run East Indian Cinema, and later, as a church and rental hall.

== Renton Theatre ==
Fey also owned the Renton Theatre, located across S. 3rd Street in the Argano building. The Renton is now the Renton Civic Theater, a local playhouse. Fey, who also built the Roxy Apartments, and his son operated the two theatres from 1924 until Fey's death in 1938. Ben Fey's remains are inurned at the Washelli columbarium at Evergreen Washelli Memorial Park.
