= Leo Lassen =

American baseball announcer (1899–1975)

Leo Lassen, Seattle sportscaster and writer.

Leo Lassen (July 5, 1899 – December 5, 1975) was an American baseball announcer in Seattle, Washington.

== Early life ==
Leo H. Lassen was born in Marathon County, Wisconsin, in 1899. Leo Lassen moved to Seattle with his German immigrant parents and two older brothers when he was a child. He grew up in the north end and attended Lincoln High School. Lassen worked as an office boy at the Post-Intelligencer and in 1918 began reporting for the Seattle Star, where he later became sports editor and managing editor. As a sports writer, Lassen would sit in the press box at the home games of Seattle's professional baseball team - then a Coast League team called the Indians. The press box was a cramped, rickety cage suspended from the rafters above the spectators, where Lassen would sit with two other sports writers, and the radio announcer. By 1930, Lassen was still single and his widowed mother was living with him in his two-story Wallingford home (valued at $6,500) at 4517 Latona Ave. NE.

== Sports announcing ==
In 1931, when the broadcasting position became open, Lassen moved from the sports writer's chair to the announcer's chair with ease. Lassen once told an interviewer, “Baseball is the greatest sport ever devised by man.” His lightning-fast and incredibly accurate descriptions of the action was legendary. Seattle Times reporter Don Duncan wrote, “The lag time between the voice and the double play, the throw to first, or the long fly ball could be measured in fractions of a second.” Lassen's intricate knowledge of the game and all of its players even allowed him to effectively “re-create” away games for his listening audience. For this, he would sit at his microphone while a telegraph operator sent the barest of details, such as the batter's name and the ball-to-strike count, with Lassen filling in all the details using only his extensive knowledge and imagination. He was so compelling in his recounts, the majority of fans had no idea he wasn't actually at the games watching the action unfold. In 1938, the struggling Seattle Indians were purchased and became the more successful Rainiers. With this success came more Seattle fans and more Lassen admirers. One man is said to have claimed that Lassen's explanation of the infield-fly rule was so good, “even my wife understands it.” People started calling him, “Mr. Baseball,” or "The Great Gabbo," and often entertained themselves by trying to imitate his famous nasal twang, known as “The Voice.” He endeared fans with his famous phrases, still known as “Lassenisms,” like when he told listeners during close games, “Hang on to those rocking chairs!”

== Later years ==
In 1960, the Rainiers were purchased again, and a salary dispute ensued. Unable to reach an agreement, Lassen walked out at the end of the 1960 baseball season, after almost thirty years with the club. Dejected, the normally happy and outgoing lifelong bachelor became a recluse who continued to care for his aged and near blind mother in his same home on Latona Ave. until her death in 1968, at the age of ninety-eight. In 1975, Lassen endured several hospitalizations for lung congestion and in 1975, “The Voice” was forever silenced, leaving only his friend and housemate, Edward Egerdahl, to make his final arrangements. He is inurned at the Washelli Columbarium at Evergreen Washelli Memorial Park. For twenty-nine seasons, Seattle's beloved baseball announcer signed off by saying, “Uh, this is Leo Lassen speaking. I hope you enjoyed it.” Lassen was inducted into the Washington Sports Hall of Fame in 1974.
