= Evergreen Washelli Memorial Park =

Cemetery in King County, Washington

- Judge Thomas Burke Monument at Evergreen Washelli Memorial Park
- Interactive map of Evergreen Washelli Memorial Park

Details
- Established: 1885
- Location: Seattle, Washington
- Country: USA
- Coordinates: 47°42′36″N 122°20′45″W
- Size: 144 acres
- No. of interments: 160,000 (est)
- Find a Grave: Evergreen Washelli Memorial Park

Evergreen Washelli Memorial Park originated in 1885. It is located on both sides of Aurora Avenue in Seattle, Washington, and occupies roughly 144 acres (58 ha). It is the largest cemetery in Seattle.

== History ==
At the time of its inception, the area was known as Oak Lake, a full day's carriage ride from downtown via Ballard, Seattle, Washington. David Denny owned land by the lake, and when the old Seattle Cemetery was to become Denny Park he moved the remains of his infant son from there to his property at Oak Lake.

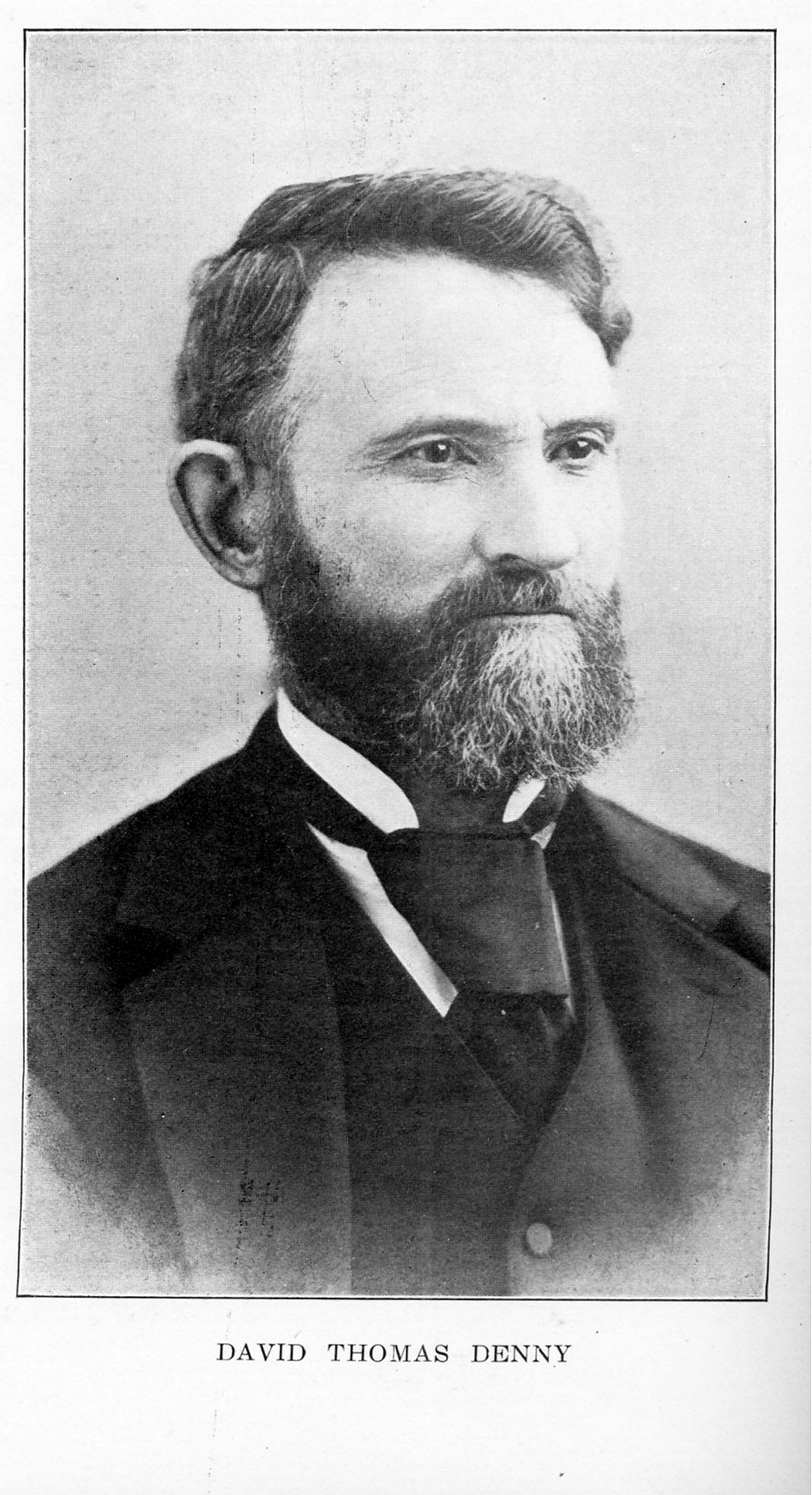
David Denny, one of the founders of Seattle

In 1887, David's cousin Henry Levi Denny moved his family's plot from Capitol Hill to the new burial ground, and over time the number of burials increased, usually by family members and associates of the Denny Party.

In 1903, the property, known as Oaklake Cemetery, was inherited by David's son, Victor Denny. Victor sold the property in 1914 to the American Necropolis Association, a St. Louis-based company that owned cemetery properties in several states. The ANA gave the cemetery the name "Washelli" (a Makah word meaning "westerly wind"), which had been the name of a central Seattle cemetery disestablished in 1887. In 1919, the Evergreen Cemetery Company started a competing cemetery on the western side of Aurora Avenue, directly opposite Washelli Cemetery. In 1922, Evergreen Cemetery purchased Washelli from the ANA, although the merger did not become final until 1928. By 1952, Evergreen had taken over the mausolea, crematory and columbarium. The cemetery changed its name to Evergreen Washelli in 1962.

The Evergreen Washelli cemetery was started as an "endowment care" cemetery, therefore a portion of the cost of a grave is designated into a trust fund for maintenance of the grounds. This allows for a cemetery to remain as a perpetual landmark. The Evergreen Washelli funeral home was started in 1972 in response to public demand. It quickly outgrew its offices on the eastern side of Washelli, and in 1994, moved into larger premises on the Evergreen side of the property, west of Aurora Avenue. Evergreen Washelli Memorial Park consists of the Evergreen–Washelli Cemetery, Evergreen Washelli Funeral Home, Crematory, and Cemetery, Veterans Memorial Cemetery, Bothell Funeral Home, and Abbey View Cemetery in Brier, Washington.

== Veterans Memorial Cemetery ==
The Veterans Memorial Cemetery was started in 1927, and contains over 5,000 white marble headstones. It also hosts two carronades from the frigate USS Constitution (known as "Old Ironsides"), and a 65-foot-tall (20 m) Chimes Tower.

Construction of the Chimes Tower began in 1950 and the tower was built in part with contributions from local veterans groups. The octagonal tower of amber glass and concrete bears the emblems of the contributing veterans organizations on many of its windows. The chimes carillon, which was installed in 1965, used to play patriotic tunes every hour, but was later silenced and remained still for many years. Today, the chimes sound at noon and 4:30 p.m. daily, in addition to special occasions such as Memorial Day and Veterans Day. It stands as a permanent memorial to veterans who were buried elsewhere, but who are remembered by friends and relatives.

Buried here are several Medal of Honor recipients.

== Doughboy statue ==
The Doughboy Statue at the Veterans Memorial Cemetery

In 1921, famous Seattle sculptor Alonzo Victor Lewis was commissioned to create a temporary plaster figure to commemorate the Seattle reunion of the 91st Division. Working mainly from his modest studio on Eastlake Avenue, Lewis used three soldiers from Fort Lawton as models and cast his plaster soldier to portray American patriotism, later stating that he envisioned the young soldier as "just returning from a victory — mud-covered and with a grim smile on his face."

In 1998, the "Doughboy" statue (cast in 1928) was moved from the Seattle Center to the Veterans Cemetery, and was re-dedicated there on November 11, 1998. Memorial Day Services have been held in the cemetery annually since 1927. Despite the record in the Smithsonian Inventory of American Sculpture listing other titles of this statue as Spirit of the American Doughboy, this work has nothing to do with E. M. Viquesney's creation bearing that title, and is of a completely different design and pose.

== Washelli Columbarium ==
East of Aurora Avenue stands the Washelli columbarium, which holds the cremated remains of approximately 30,000 persons. Among these persons are the notable individuals Ben Fey, Leo Lassen, Ben Paris, and Stephen B. Packard.

== Totem pole ==
The totem pole which weighs 800 pounds (360 kg) and stands 16 feet (4.9 m) high, had been carved by Luke Watson in the Queen Charlotte Islands in British Columbia and was shipped across Puget Sound to Thomas Kelley on Bainbridge Island. In the early 1930s, Kelley gave the pole to his next-door neighbor Clinton S. Harley, then General Manager of Evergreen Washelli, who had the indigenous art erected in the cemetery.

Haida Totem Pole

According to Haida legend, the totem tells the story of Genanasimgat and his wife, who was the daughter of a powerful chief. Having heard that some hunters had spotted a rare white sea-otter, the mother of his bride asked Genanasimgat to kill the otter for its beautiful white fur, which he did. While the mother was skinning the otter, some blood got on the fur, so she asked her daughter to wash it in the sea, which her dutiful daughter did, but somehow the fur escaped her grasp and drifted into deeper water. During her pursuit of the fur, two orca whales kidnapped her. Genanasimgat, who loved his wife with all his heart, followed her to the bottom of the sea, where he met a crane, who hid him from the orcas under her breast feathers. After a number of other suspenseful adventures, Genanasimgat finally rescued his beloved wife and escaped home with her.

== Bothell Funeral Home and Abbey View Memorial Park ==
Abbey View Memorial Park in Brier, Washington was founded by the Evergreen Washelli Memorial Park in 1953 and covers 85 acres (34 ha). The Evergreen Washelli Funeral Home at Bothell, Washington was purchased in 1999, and provides preparation, cremation, memorialization, as well as chapel services.

== Notable burials ==
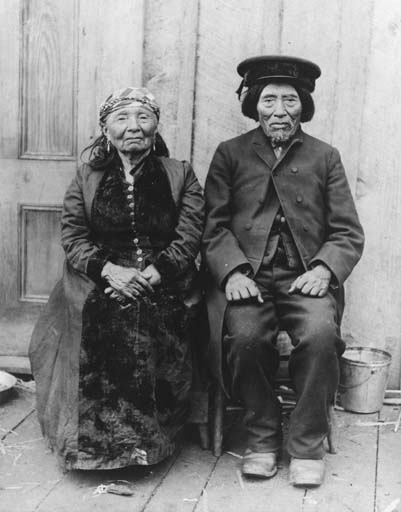
Tleboletsa (aka Mrs. Madeline Chesshiahud) and her husband, Lake John Cheshiahud, at their home on Portage Bay north of Seattle, Washington

- Medal of Honor recipients
  - Lewis Albanese (1946–1966) – United States Army Private First Class during the Vietnam War, posthumously awarded for his actions during a fire fight where he freed his platoon from sniper fire.
  - Orville Emil Bloch (1915–1983) – United States Army officer, awarded for his actions in World War II.
  - Harry Delmar Fadden (1882–1955) – United States Navy sailor, received peacetime medal.
  - Emil Fredericksen (1867–1950) – United States Navy sailor, received peacetime medal.
  - William Charlie Horton (1876–1969) – United States Marine, awarded for his actions during the Boxer Rebellion.
  - Robert Ronald Leisy (1945–1969) – United States Army officer, awarded for his actions in the Vietnam War.
  - William K. Nakamura (1922–1944) – United States Army soldier, awarded for his actions in World War II.
- Other notables
  - Joe Abreu (1913–1993) – A former professional baseball player, and a member of the United States Navy during World War II.
  - John Barnes (1855–1929) – A Minor League Baseball manager and organizer of the Pacific Northwest League in 1890.
  - C. Louise Boehringer (1878–1956), first female Superintendent of Schools, Yuma County and the first female to be elected to office in Arizona.
  - Dorothy Bullitt (1892–1989) – A radio and television pioneer who founded King Broadcasting Company, a major owner of broadcast stations in Seattle.
  - Thomas Burke (1849–1925) – Lawyer, railroad builder, and judge who made his career in Seattle, Washington.
  - George Carmack (1860–1922) – prospector in the Yukon credited by some with starting the Yukon Gold Rush.
  - Cheshiahud (1820–1910) – A Duwamish chief who was a friend of the Denny Party and one of the few Native Americans to own property in Seattle. Buried beside his first wife, Lucy.
  - G. Kenneth Davidson (1919-2002) - Actor who played "Old Guy at Hap's" in David Lynch's "Twin Peaks: Fire Walk With Me." (1992)
  - Demetrius DuBose (1971–1999) – National Football League player with the Tampa Bay Buccaneers.
  - Ben Fey (1874–1938) – Movie theatre owner.
  - Brenden Foster (1997–2008) – A boy from Bothell, Washington, diagnosed with acute lymphoblastic leukemia in 2005. KOMO, a local broadcasting station, reported the story of Brenden's last wish, which was to feed the homeless, sparking international media attention.
  - Frank Foyston (1891–1966) – A Canadian professional ice hockey forward, three-time Stanley Cup Champion and Seattle Metropolitan from 1915 to 1924.
  - Hiram C. Gill (1866–1919) – Lawyer and two-time Seattle mayor, identified with the "open city" politics that advocated toleration of prostitution, alcohol, and gambling.
  - Roger Sherman Greene (1840–1930) – Lawyer, judge, politician and military officer.
  - John Philo Hoyt (1841–1926) – Politician and jurist.
  - Gary Kildall (1942–1994) – Computer scientist and microcomputer entrepreneur who created the CP/M operating system and founded Digital Research.
  - Bertha Knight Landes (1868–1943) – The first female mayor of a major American city. Landes served as mayor of Seattle, Washington from 1926 to 1928.
  - Leo Lassen (1899–1975) – Baseball announcer in Seattle, Washington.
  - Lawrence Denny Lindsley (1879–1974) – Photographer and also a miner, hunter, and guide. Lindsley was a grandson of Seattle pioneer, David Thomas Denny, a member of the Denny Party.
  - Alfred Lueben (1859–1932) – A German-born music professor and conductor in Seattle, Washington.
  - Godfrey Lundberg (1879–1933) – An accomplished engraver during the early part of the twentieth century.
  - Donald H. Magnuson (1911–1979) – A U.S. Representative from Washington.
  - Henry McBride (1856–1937) – The fourth governor of Washington state; he was also a teacher, telegraph operator, and Superior Court judge.
  - John Okada (1923–1971) – A Japanese-American writer and author of the novel No-No Boy.
  - Stephen B. Packard (1839–1922) – A carpetbagger from Maine who emerged as an important Republican politician in Louisiana during the era of Reconstruction. He was the unsuccessful Republican gubernatorial nominee in 1876.
  - Ben Paris (1884–1950) – Sportsman, entrepreneur, conservationist, and owner of a landmark restaurant in Seattle, Washington. Paris founded the Seattle Ben Paris Salmon Derby.
  - Thomas Pelly (1902–1973) – Politician, served as a member of the United States House of Representatives.
  - Lewis B. Schwellenbach (1894–1948) – Lawyer, politician, and judge.
  - Bell M. Shimada (1922–1958) – Fisheries scientist who pioneered the study of the tuna fishery in the tropical Pacific Ocean.
  - Watson Carvosso Squire (1838–1926) – A United States Senator from Washington.
  - Donald S. Voorhees (1916–1989) – A United States federal judge and civic activist.
  - Betty Taylor (1919–2011) – Entertainer
  - Roy William Wier (1888–1963) – A U.S. Representative from Minnesota.
  - Cully Wilson (1892–1962) – A professional ice hockey player. The right winger played in the National Hockey League for the Toronto St. Pats, Montreal Canadiens, Hamilton Tigers, and Chicago Black Hawks between 1919 and 1927.
  - Marion Zioncheck (1901–1936) – Politician, served as a member of the United States House of Representatives from 1933 until his death in 1936. He represented Washington's 1st congressional district as a Democrat.
  - Masaki Nakamura (1908-1945) - U.S. Army Soldier posthumously awarded the Purple Heart for his service during World War II.
