= Kiara (building) =

Residential skyscraper in Seattle, Washington

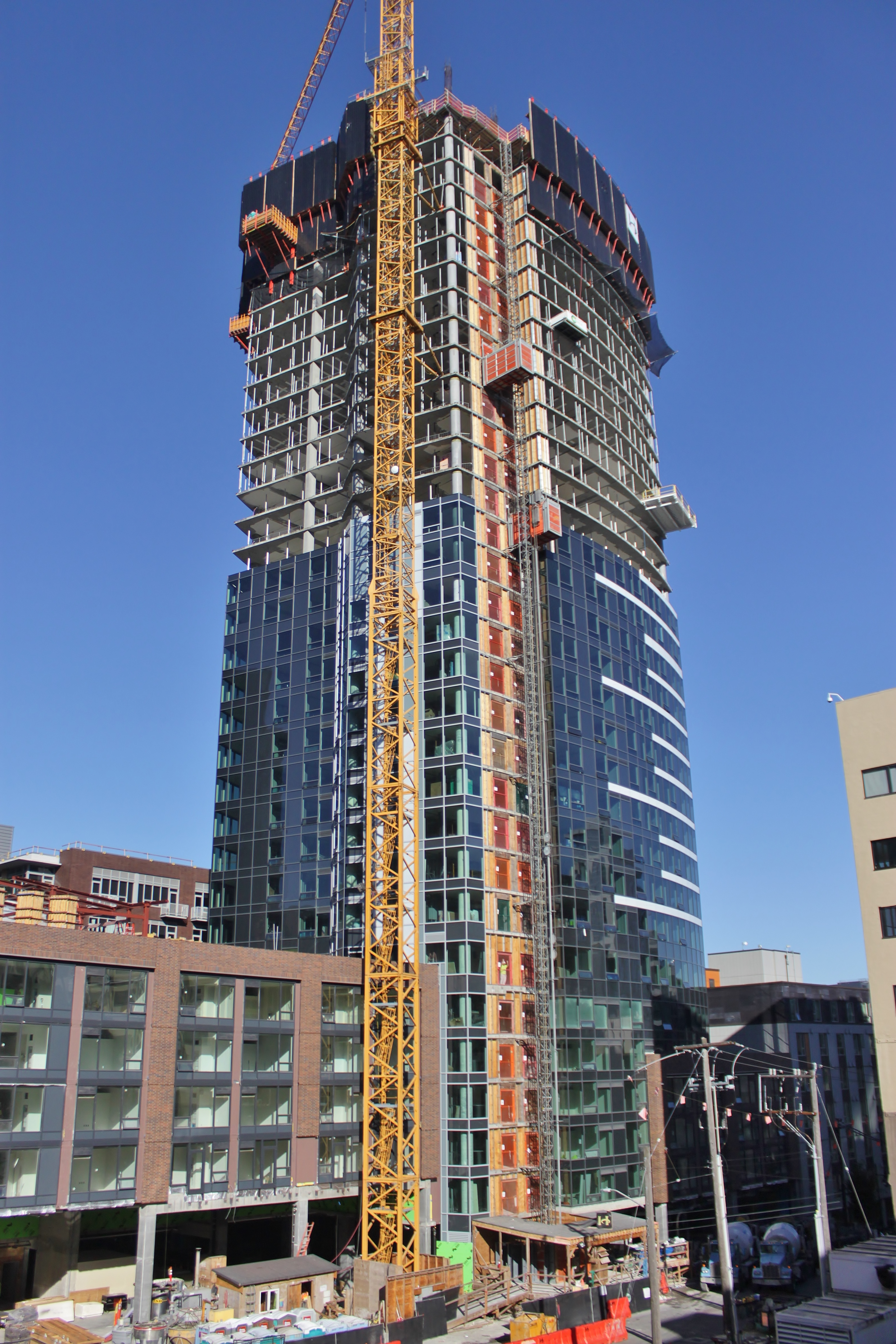
- Under construction in September 2017
- Interactive map of the Kiara area

General information
- Status: Completed
- Type: Residential
- Location: 970 Denny Way; Seattle, Washington
- Coordinates: 47°37′08.85″N 122°20′15.38″W
- Construction started: 2016
- Opened: September 2018
- Cost: $94 million
- Owner: Pontegadea

Height
- Architectural: 435 feet (133 m)
- Roof: 400 feet (120 m)

Technical details
- Floor count: 40

Design and construction
- Architecture firm: Weber Thompson
- Developer: Holland Partner Group

Other information
- Number of units: 461 apartments
- Parking: 374 parking stalls

Kiara (also known as 970 Denny Way) is a residential skyscraper in Seattle, Washington. The 40-story, 435-foot-tall (133 m) tower has 461 apartments and was completed in 2018. It is first skyscraper in the South Lake Union neighborhood and is one of the few highrise buildings outside the traditional boundaries of Downtown Seattle. The building is located at the intersection of Denny Way and Terry Avenue, near the headquarters of The Seattle Times and the Cornish College of the Arts. Kiara is owned by Pontegadea, who acquired the building in 2022.

== Design and features ==
Developer Holland Partner Group contracted architecture firm Weber Thompson to design a building that reflected both the industrial origins of the neighborhood (as seen in the six-story brick podium) as well as the high-tech future (as seen in the tower's glass exterior). The building will feature a 374-stall parking garage, as well as 188 bike spaces, and amenity spaces such as an outdoor porch and rooftop deck. The podium will house 15,100 square feet (1,400 m^{2}) of retail space.

The building's penthouse is 3,000 square feet (280 m^{2}) and has a monthly lease of $19,265.

== History ==
Holland Partner Group announced plans for a 40-story residential skyscraper on the site in December 2014, and purchased the site in March 2015 for $20.1 million. The design was approved by the city of Seattle in December 2015, allowing for construction to begin in January 2016 with the demolition of a three-story warehouse on the project site that was built in 1927. The building was opened on September 1, 2018.

Kiara was sold by Holland in 2020 to Oxford Properties, a Canadian real estate investor, for approximately $320 million. Spanish investment firm Pontegadea, owned by Amancio Ortega, acquired the building in December 2022 for $322.2 million. Oxford stated to the Seattle Daily Journal of Commerce that they intended to invest the proceeds in other types of properties, including those in the Seattle area.
