= The Terry Thomas Building =

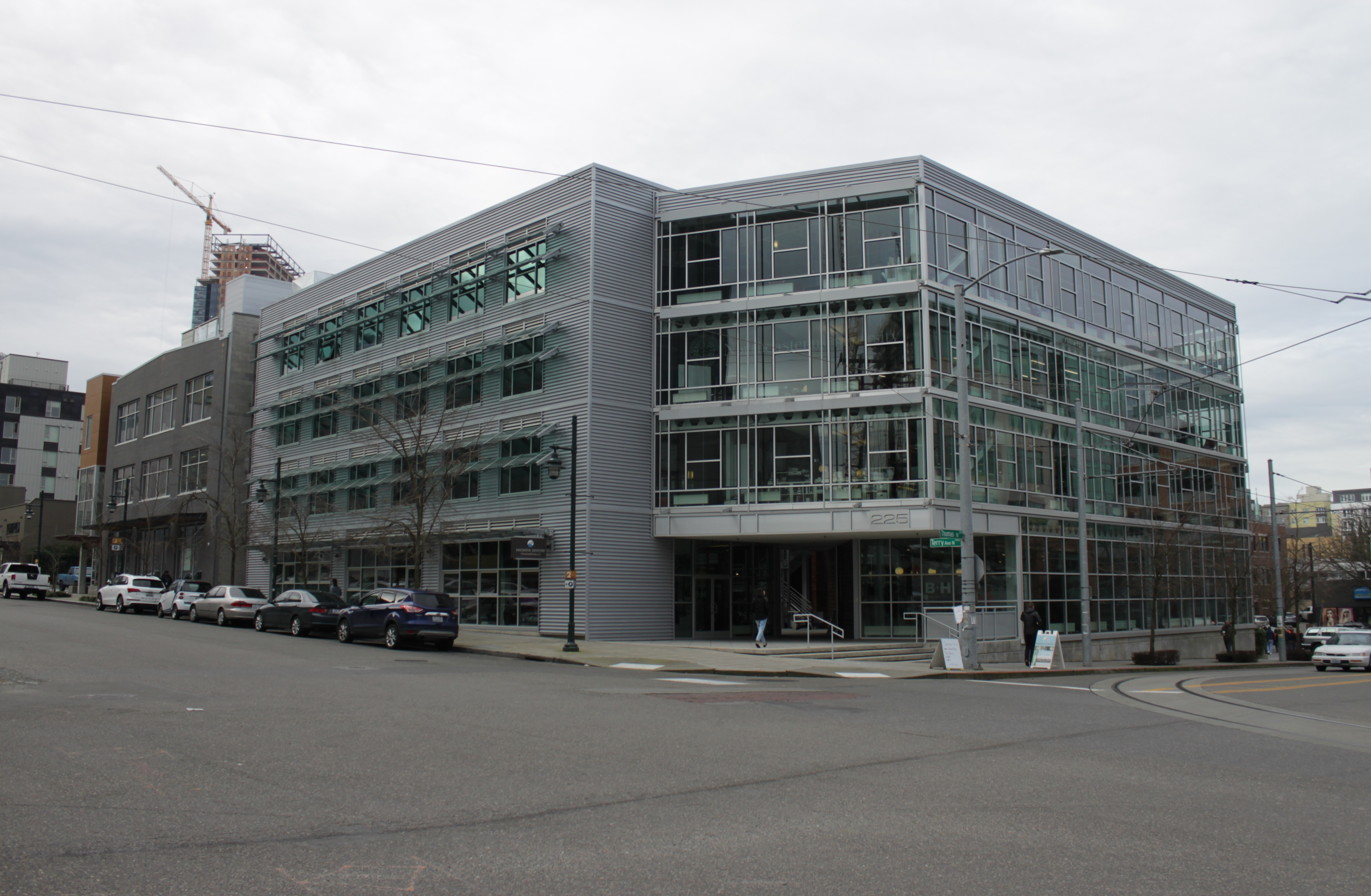

General information
- Status: Completed
- Type: Office building
- Location: 225 Terry Avenue N Seattle, Washington
- Coordinates: 47°37′14″N 122°20′15″W
- Current tenants: Weber Thompson
- Construction started: February 2007
- Completed: April 2008
- Cost: $9.7 million
- Client: Weber Thompson

Technical details
- Floor count: 4
- Floor area: 40,000 sq ft (3,700 m^{2})

Design and construction
- Architecture firm: Weber Thompson
- Developer: Terry & Thomas LLC
- Awards: LEED Gold and Platinum, 2009

The Terry Thomas Building, located in the South Lake Union neighborhood of Seattle, Washington is a sustainable, LEED-certified office building completed in 2008. The Terry Thomas is Seattle's first commercial office building structure developed in decades without central air conditioning. It was designed by Seattle-based architectural firm Weber Thompson, who also designed the interiors of the building and use it as their headquarters.

== History ==
The former building – a light industrial warehouse from the 1920s – was once used as a practice space for one of Seattle's best known bands, Pearl Jam. Most of the existing, two-story building was salvaged for reusable building materials and components, in particular, the brick and heavy timber. 93% of the materials reclaimed during demolition were recycled and 94% of construction waste was recycled.

== Design and features ==
The Terry Thomas was designed to provide a healthy and creative work environment and to illustrate the possibilities of sustainable design. The project was driven by Weber Thompson, who was looking for space to accommodate their expanding architectural practice. The firm wanted to stay in the neighborhood in a building that reinforced their commitment to sustainable design.

The building is a redevelopment of an urban site in the Seattle neighborhood of South Lake Union. The mixed-use neighborhood, formerly a light-industrial zone, includes parks, multi-family residences, offices (including the Amazon.com campus) and light-industrial buildings. It is also located on the South Lake Union Streetcar line.

The project goals for the building were to develop a sustainable building without air conditioning. Sustainable strategies incorporated into the design include shallow floor plates, operable windows, a central open-air courtyard, different treatments on the façades to minimize heat retention, and floor-to-ceiling glass at optimal height-to-depth ratios and open floor plans to maximize daylight.

The building is constructed out of recycled steel, aluminum, and fly-ash concrete. Interior finish materials were produced using sustainable methods with high recycled content. The windows and storefront are locally manufactured, as is the metal exterior cladding. The exterior cladding of the building also includes FSC-Certified ipe wood. The interior minimizes the use of additional finish materials.

Materials were chosen for their ability to serve multiple functions. Castellated beams were integrated into the structure to reduce the weight of steel used and to encourage air movement. The exposed concrete slab was polished and used as the finish floor surface. The castellated steel beam structure, chosen for strength, lower cost, and reduced material, was left exposed and painted white, allowing light, air, and services to circulate. The metal cable-tray system corrals electrical and data cabling also serves as the support for the light fixtures. Ceiling-mounted acoustical panels double as light reflectors. Acoustical wall panels provide additional noise damping and a place to pin up sketches.

The courtyard doughnut shape is critical to the two main design priorities: daylighting and natural ventilation. Natural daylighting was achieved through the shallow floor-plate depths and high ceilings, allowing for light to penetrate the interior of the offices from both the exterior of the building and the core open-air courtyard. Daylighting models were tested at the University of Washington's Integrated Design Lab to ensure even lighting and minimizing glare to users working on computers. Within the bulk of the building, daylight sensors are on all lighting within 15 feet of the windows, and Energy Star equipment is provided to reduce the plug load. Automated blinds are installed on specific windows that modeling predicted would receive the most sun. These "smart blinds" automatically adjust depending on the sunlight levels and orientation. On the roof, sensors with hemispherical lens acts as photocells, monitoring the intensity of lights. A wind sensor causes the blinds to retract into their housings when the wind exceeds 40 miles per hour (64 km/h). Interior controllers on the ceiling are programmed based on the blinds' orientation towards the sun, building latitude, and an astronomical clock that tracks the seasons.

Passive cooling is achieved through multiple design strategies, the most significant being operable windows. The windows are enhanced by automated louvers, high ceilings, a shallow floor plate, and a central court that acts as a chimney, drawing the warmer air out of the windows and up through the courtyard. Exterior shading devices protect occupants from significant solar heat gains, and a white roof keeps the upper floors cool while reducing the urban heat island effect. Every exterior façade is treated differently, according to its micro-climate and sun exposure.

Good indoor air quality was of paramount importance in the design of the building. Low-emitting materials such as low-VOC paints, adhesives, and carpets were specified to minimize the impact of offgassing on the air quality. CO_{2} sensors throughout the building control exterior louvers that deliver fresh air into the space. Operationally, a recycling program is mandatory and tenants are committed to use recycled and environmentally-friendly products in their daily operations and cleaning. A green-building operations manual and a tenant manual were developed for all tenants.

Lighting is controlled by several methods. Photoelectric eyes measure the amount of sun coming into the space and increase or decrease the fluorescent lighting to balance the light levels in the office. Occupancy/motion sensors turn lights on and off in conference spaces and the lights are programmed to turn off automatically at night and on weekends. These strategies reduce the wattage per square foot to 35% below the baseline of one watt per square foot.

Only one elevator was integrated into the building, an energy-efficient but slow model. Use of the stairs by employees is encouraged by a prominent and accessible outdoor staircase in the courtyard, while the elevator is located towards the back of the building. In order to accurately measure the energy consumption and gauge the effectiveness of the design strategies, sub-metering was installed for all tenants.

The Terry Thomas was also designed to conserve as much water as possible. A stormwater drainage system was designed to detain runoff into an on-site tank, and then slowly release it to the city stormwater system. Low-flow fixtures, dual-flush toilets, and waterless urinals were installed in order to save approximately 50% of the water during everyday operation as compared to a typical office building.

== Energy performance ==
The Terry Thomas was originally modeled to reduce its energy use by 30% to 40% from that of a typical office building with conventional air conditioning. Eliminating a traditional HVAC system contributes significantly to energy savings. As part of this energy reduction, the designers increased thermal insulation. Heating is provided by highly efficient hydronic radiators placed along exterior walls; this allows for individual temperature control. Based upon the Department of Energy's National Action Plan for Energy Efficiency metric, The Terry Thomas consumes 56% less energy than a typical class A office building.

== Awards ==
- 2008 AIA Seattle Honor Award Commendation
- 2009 AIA NW & Pacific Region Design Honor Award
- 2009 AIA COTE Top Ten Green Projects Award
- 2009 AIA Seattle What Makes It Green? Award Recipient
- 2008 Sustainable Development of the Year, Washington State, NAIOP
- 2008 Third Place, Evergreen Awards, Ecommercial Category, Eco-Structure Magazine
- 2009 First Place, ASHRAE Society level Technology Award, Commercial Buildings
- 2010 First Place, New Commercial Buildings – ASHRAE Technology Award

== Certification ==
Building: LEED Gold certified for Core and Shell

Weber Thompson Office Tenant Improvement: LEED Platinum certified for commercial interiors
