= Ava (building) =

Proposed residential skyscraper in Seattle, Washington

Ava Hotel & Residences
- Location within downtown Seattle

General information
- Status: Proposed
- Type: Residential, hotel
- Location: Seattle, Washington, United States
- Coordinates: 47.613030°N 122.332561°W

Technical details
- Floor count: 48

Design and construction
- Architect: Weber Thompson
- Developer: Fana Group

Ava (stylized as AVA) is a proposed residential skyscraper in Seattle, Washington, United States. The 48-story mixed-use building would have 395 residential units, 178 hotel rooms, ground level retail, and underground parking for 375 vehicles. It would be located at Pine Street and 8th Avenue in Downtown Seattle.

The building was initially proposed in 2007 by the Fana Group of Companies as a 39-story, 445-foot (136 m) hotel and condominium tower. The plan, designed by Weber Thompson, called for a luxury hotel on floors 10 through 17, with 200 condominiums comprising the upper floors. The project was approved by the city in 2008, but construction was cancelled during the late-2000s recession as the developer waited on an improved market. The master unit permit for the project expired in 2013, requiring the revived plan to re-apply for approval.
