= Godfrey Lundberg =

Godfrey Emanuel Lundberg (May 4, 1879 – January 8, 1933) was an accomplished engraver during the early part of the 20th century. He is most noted for his hand engraving of the Lord's Prayer on the tiny head of a gold pin that was displayed at the 1915 Panama–Pacific Exposition in San Francisco and won a gold medal in engraving. He engraved the pin in Spokane, Washington between 1913 and 1915.

== Early life and military service ==
Gottfrid Emanuel Lundberg was born in Västervik, Kalmar County, Sweden on May 4, 1879. He was the second child of Isak and Edla Maria Lundberg. In 1891 when Lundberg was 12 years old his parents and their five children moved to the United States and settled in Spokane, Washington. Lundberg entered the Spokane public schools and excelled in art and music. As a 14-year-old, one of his pen and ink drawings was good enough to be chosen for exhibit at the Chicago World's Fair in 1893. Music was a large part of the Lundberg family and all the children were musical. Godfrey Lundberg played the cornet locally in Spokane. He was also a cornet player in the military during the Spanish–American War from 1898 to 1899. He was in the First Washington Infantry Band that saw duty in the Philippines.

Following his service in the military, Lundberg returned to Spokane. Few details are available about his life during the first decade of the twentieth century. It is, however, known that two times during that period he studied in Europe under Herberich, a German government engraver, and also, in Germany, engraved banknotes for the German Government. By 1911 he was an established engraver in Spokane working for the E. J. Hyde Jewelry Company.

== The Lord's Prayer on the head of a pin ==
In 1907, Paul P. Wentz engraved the Lord's Prayer on a brass pin head with a diameter of 2 mm or .079 inch. Wentz's pin is in the Historical Society of Pennsylvania in Philadelphia. Lundberg became aware of this pin in 1912 and was convinced that he could do a much more difficult piece of work, namely engrave the Lord's Prayer on a pin head with a much smaller area. He chose a gold pin with a head diameter of .047 inch, about 1/3 the area of the Wentz pin head. He preferred gold, as it is very stable and does not corrode, rust, or become negatively affected by age. Before commencing the work, Lundberg realized that he needed to be in top physical shape to undergo the rigors of such a long, nerve-racking endeavor. According to a Spokesman-Review article in 1915:

"First, he went into training. The steadiness of nerve that would be required could come only as the result of a conditioning process stricter than that of the highly trained athlete. Tobacco, coffee and like indulgences were out of the question. Fresh air and exercise were necessary. Complete rest for the eyes had to be assured. When he felt himself 'fit' Lundberg started the next stage, which was the manufacture of a special engraving tool, which had to be of a degree of fineness beyond that attempted by the makers of the most minute instruments. It took six months to perfect the graver. The point had to be of steel and the steel had to be specially tempered so that it would hold an unprecedentedly fine point that would cut and that would not be brittle. The process by which he tempered his steel is one of Lundberg's secrets. When he finished he had a point so fine that it was hardly visible to the naked eye, and yet had sufficient tensile strength to last through the whole long-drawn, nerve-straining process."

To keep his arm, hand, fingers, microscope, graver (burin), and pin steady enough for this most delicate job of engraving, Lundberg assembled an original piece of equipment that clamped everything rigid except the tips of his fingers. Alvin H. Hankins, a jeweler and lens grinder that knew Lundberg and eventually was his employer in Seattle, was present during most of the engraving. In the early 1930s he wrote to Ripley's Believe It or Not in response to one of their cartoons (Dec. 16, 1929) that wrongly credited a Mr. Charles Baker with engraving the pin.

In Julie Mooney's book The World of Ripley's Believe It or Not it is stated: "Shortly after the cartoon was published, Ripley's received a letter from Alvin H. Hankins of Seattle, Washington, who claimed that Baker was a fraud. Hankins insisted that Charles Edward Baker didn't make the pin – the late Godfrey E. Lundberg did, before Hankins' eyes. Hankins, a lens grinder, had been present during the entire time Lundberg worked on the pin. He told of the grueling conditions Lundberg imposed upon himself to complete the work. Lundberg worked from a barber's chair, strapping his hands to an iron bar to keep them from shaking. He also bound his wrists tightly with leather straps, because the rhythm of his pulse caused the engraving tool to skip. Lundberg could only work on the pin in the evenings, when the rumbling trolley cars that passed by his shop had stopped running for the day. He destroyed more than two hundred pins in his attempt to create one perfect engraving."

Lundberg only worked on the pin for a short period of time in the late hours of the night or early hours of the morning because there was too much vibration from activity in the area at other times. Even with this professional prudence a tragic setback tested Lundberg's will and determination.

"In spite of all precautions there were several setbacks, one of them particularly disheartening. Two or three pins Lundberg had started, only to have some unexpected minute jar deflect the needle and spoil the letters that had been drawn. But finally eight of the 12 lines had been completed and the end was in sight. Starting early one morning on the ninth line Lundberg saw through the microscope the graving tool swerve and cut through the completed part. He had felt no jar, but he knew there must have been one. He ran out of the shop, could see no vehicle on the deserted streets, but heard the rumble of a heavy truck. It was two blocks away, but its effect had been as destructive as if it had been in the same room. The work had to be begun all over. 'I came near giving up the job', says Lundberg when he tells about this tragic event. But he started out, a few strokes a night, reaching his home early every morning with each individual nerve on edge and with eyes aching from the strain. He has calculated that 1863 strokes of the graver went into the task."

After finishing engraving the Lord's Prayer, Lundberg engraved on the point of a fine gold needle the letters IHS for "Iesus Hominum Salvator" or "Jesus, Savior of Men". Nervous strain caused Lundberg to lose weight and culminated in a nervous breakdown after he had finished the pin. He declared, "I wouldn't undertake a feat like that again for any amount of money."

Being exhausted with nervous prostration and in desperate need of total rest, Lundberg entrusted the task of revealing the pin to the public to his brothers Carl and Mauritz. Spokane dignitaries were the first to see the engravings and official letters of appreciation and authentication were received from the Spokane County Commissioners, Spokane County Prosecuting Attorney and the Spokane County Superior Court.

== Panama–Pacific Exposition and tour of country ==
Brothers Carl and Mauritz exhibited Lundberg's pin at the 1915 Panama–Pacific Exposition in San Francisco. Along with the pin was a gold needle on the point of which Lundberg had engraved the letters US to honor his adopted country. These two engravings were displayed in the Palace of Liberal Arts. The pin was awarded a gold medal in engraving.

Following the exposition in 1915 brother Mauritz Lundberg (with brother Carl occasionally joining) toured the country for two years displaying the engravings in forty-three states and parts of Canada. In 1916, while on tour, the pin was photographed through a microscope by scholars at a Texas university.

== Moves to Seattle ==
In 1919 Lundberg, his wife Anna, and son Edris moved to Seattle, Washington where he was employed by his longtime friend Alvin H. Hankins, who owned a jewelry business. Not long after moving to Seattle, Lundberg and his wife Anna purchased a home in the Roanoke Park neighborhood of Seattle.

Lundberg died in 1933 at the Naval Hospital in Bremerton, Washington. He was 53 years old. He is buried at Evergreen-Washelli Memorial Park in Seattle.
