= Helios (building) =

Residential skyscraper in downtown Seattle, Washington

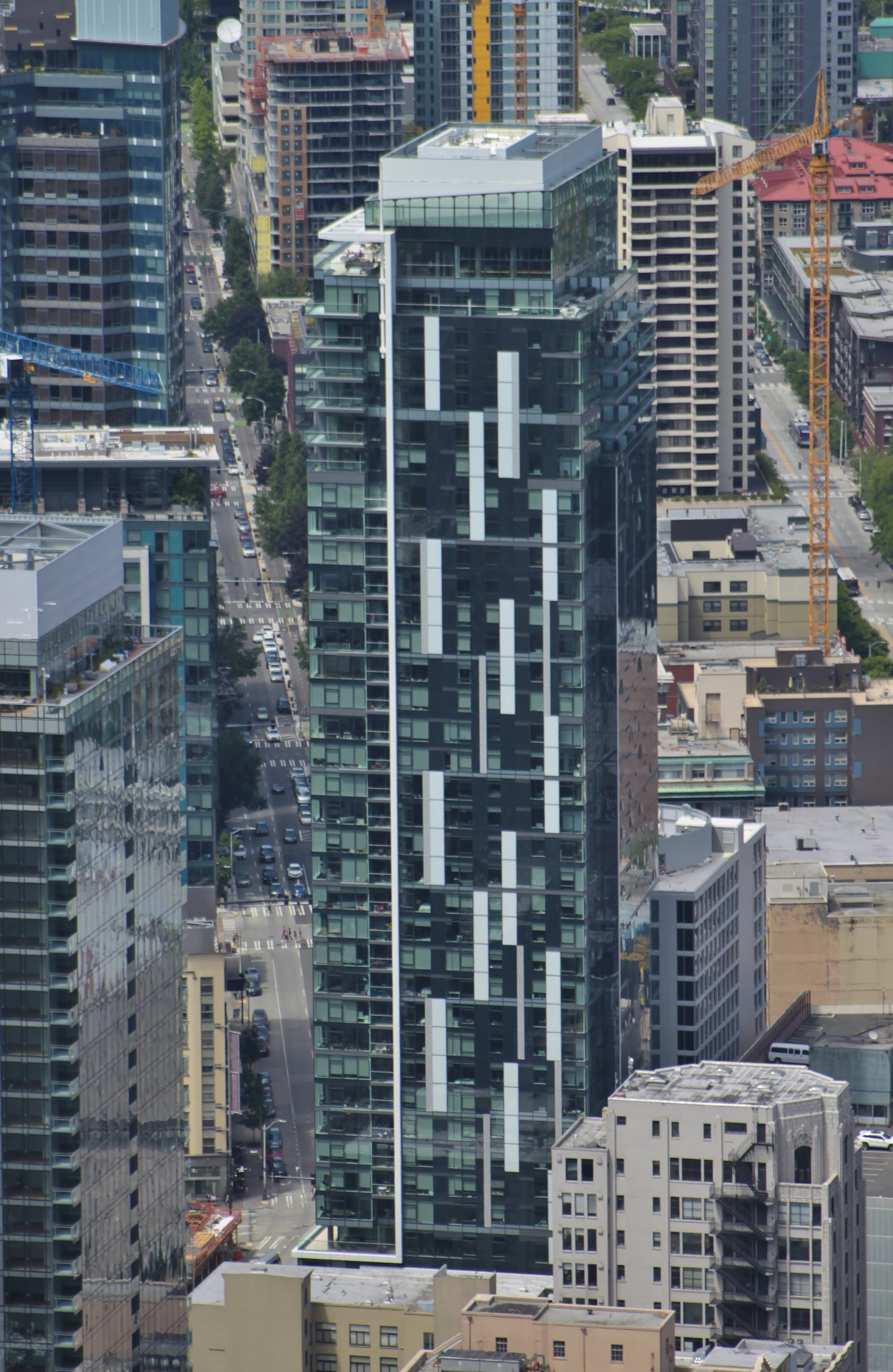

- Location within Downtown Seattle

General information
- Status: Completed
- Type: Residential
- Location: 204 Pine Street; Seattle, Washington
- Coordinates: 47.6108°N 122.3398°W
- Construction started: 2014
- Completed: 2017
- Cost: $78 million

Height
- Height: 440 feet (130 m)

Technical details
- Floor count: 40

Design and construction
- Architecture firm: Weber Thompson; GBD Architects
- Developer: Equity Residential
- Structural engineer: Magnusson Klemencic Associates

Other information
- Number of units: 398 apartments
- Parking: 217 parking stalls

Helios, also known as 2nd & Pine, is a residential skyscraper in downtown Seattle, Washington. The 40-story tower is 440 feet (130 m) tall with 398 luxury apartments. Plans for the project were first proposed in 2013 and construction began in late 2014. It is located at the intersection of 2nd Avenue and Pine Street near the Pike Place Market and the city's retail core.

Architects Weber Thompson and GBD Architects, working on the project in a joint venture, described the tower's design as "slender and sculpted". It sits atop a podium, housing 3,000 square feet (280 m^{2}) of retail space, with a terra-cotta facade. The building also includes Zipcar parking spaces, electric vehicle charging stations, bicycle parking, low-energy appliances, and other environmentally-friendly features in a bid to earn a LEED rating.

The five-story, 217-stall underground parking garage extends north from the tower's lot to a site that is occupied by a 16-story hotel that opened in 2018.

== History ==
The site at 2nd Avenue and Pine Street was originally proposed for a 240-foot-tall (73 m) residential tower developed by Paul Brenneke and planned to break ground in 2006. The tower would include a five-story hotel, an upscale athletic club, or a Saks Fifth Avenue department store.

Brenneke's plans were scrapped after a new downtown zoning ordinance was approved in 2006, and a new, 23-story, $200 million mixed-use highrise named "1 Hotel & Residences" was proposed by Brenneke and Starwood Capital Group. The proposed building would have 98 luxury condominiums and a 110-room hotel as well as four floors of retail at ground level and a luxury gym. The project broke ground in 2007 and was expected to be completed in 2009, but construction was halted in September 2007 because of the 2008 financial crisis, and designs were revised to eliminate over 100 proposed condominium units after only 20 of them had been sold. Brenneke sold his stake in the project to Starwood in June 2008, citing the project's financial difficulties. The excavated hole was later filled in 2009 and paved over with a parking lot.

The half-block property was bought by Chicago-based Equity Residential in 2012 for $22 million, and the company announced its plans for a 39-story apartment building in January 2013. Construction of the building, led by Turner Construction, began in October 2014 and was completed in 2017.

A 16-story, 229-room hotel on the north side of the lot, facing Stewart Street, was proposed by Widewaters Group and began construction in 2016. It opened in 2018 under Hilton's Charter Hotel brand and includes a rooftop bar. It was sold in 2022 for $107.8 million to a Utah-based company.
