= Arrivé =

High-rise hotel and residences in Seattle, Washington, US

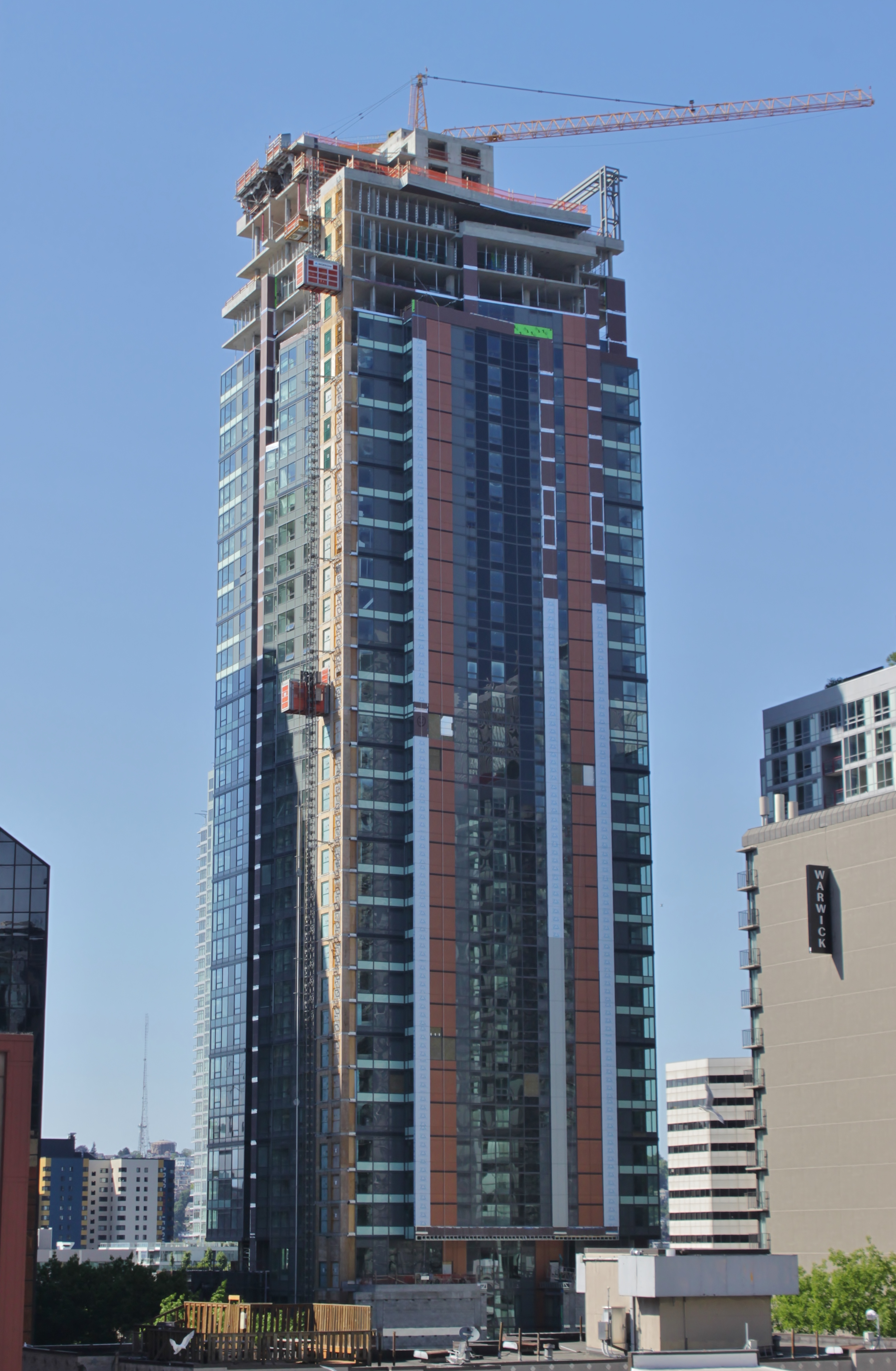
- Under construction in May 2018

- Location within downtown Seattle
- Former names: Potala Tower, Cinema Tower

General information
- Status: Completed
- Type: Residential and hotel
- Location: 2116 4th Avenue; Seattle, Washington
- Coordinates: 47°36′51.91″N 122°20′30.24″W
- Groundbreaking: August 28, 2014
- Construction started: April 2015
- Construction stopped: August 2015 – October 2016
- Topped-out: May 2018
- Opened: February 12, 2019
- Cost: $190 million

Height
- Roof: 440 ft (130 m)

Technical details
- Floor count: 41
- Floor area: 530,000 sq ft (49,000 m^{2})

Design and construction
- Architecture firm: Weber Thompson
- Developer: Binjiang Tower Corp and Molasky Group
- Main contractor: PCL Construction

Other information
- Number of units: 344 apartments, 142 hotel rooms
- Parking: 174 stalls

Website
- Arrivé Seattle

Arrivé (/ɑːriːˈveɪ/ ah-ree-VAY) is a 440-foot (130 m), 41-story skyscraper in the Belltown neighborhood of Seattle, Washington. The $190 million project, originally named Potala Tower after the Potala Palace in Tibet, was designed by Weber Thompson and consists of 344 apartments and a 142-room hotel. It was financed partially by Chinese nationals through the EB-5 visa program and began construction in April 2015.

Construction was put on hold in August 2015, when the assets of project developer Lobsang Dargey were frozen by a court order after a civil fraud suit by the U.S. Securities and Exchange Commission (SEC). The SEC alleges that Dargey diverted funds from the project for his own personal uses, including the purchase of his Bellevue home and gambling. The project was then transferred to a court-appointed receiver and later stripped of its EB-5 eligibility. In May 2016, the presiding judge approved a plan by two firms to buy out Dargey's share of the project and restart construction, pending approval from EB-5 investors; in October, the two companies signed an agreement to restart construction and re-brand the project. The tower was completed and opened in February 2019.

== Design and architecture ==
Arrivé was designed by Seattle architecture firm Weber Thompson with elements referencing the Seattle Cinerama movie theater, located adjacent to the property. The project was originally called "Cinema Tower", prior to its transfer to Dargey Development.

The tower itself is 41 stories, including 2,743 square feet (254.8 m^{2}) of retail space at ground level, 329 parking spaces, 142 hotel rooms, and 344 apartments comprising floors 11 through 41. Amenities include a 7th floor deck for the hotel and a rooftop terrace for apartment residents; the original design for the rooftop deck included an outdoor movie theater. The Sound Hotel operates within the tower, occupying floors 2 through 10, and includes a lounge, meeting spaces, a fitness center, and a bistro. The apartments range from 520-square-foot (48 m^{2}) studio to a 1,869-square-foot (173.6 m^{2}) penthouse.

As of 2016, the project was seeking a LEED Silver certification.

== History ==
=== Planning and construction ===
The 1/3-acre (0.13 ha) site, facing 4th Avenue between Blanchard and Lenora streets and located adjacent to the Seattle Cinerama theater in Belltown, was bought by HAL Real Estate Investments in 2008 for $5 million. HAL applied for permits to build a 38-story building with 365 apartments, called the "Cinema Tower".

In 2013, developer Lobsang Dargey bought the property from HAL for $11.5 million, and announced his intention to build a mixed-use tower on the site. Dargey, a former Tibetan Buddhist monk who immigrated to Seattle in 1997, planned to finance the project with EB-5 visas through his company, Path America. The project's approach to EB-5 financing was also promoted by Lieutenant Governor Brad Owen during a state trip to Shanghai in 2014. The proposed tower, renamed "Potala Tower" after the Potala Palace in Lhasa, Tibet, was unveiled in July 2014; Hotel Indigo was identified as the operator of the 142-hotel in the tower. Construction on the project was scheduled to begin later that year and end by 2017.

Dargey was joined by Mayor Ed Murray and actor Tom Skerritt, a personal friend of his, at a groundbreaking ceremony for the project on August 28, 2014. The ceremony, which included a blessing from Buddhist monks and participants wearing traditional khatas (a type of ceremonial Buddhist scarf), marked the beginning of demolition for the Dean Transmissions building on the site. Site excavation, marking the actual start of construction, began the following April under the direction of PCL Construction. A construction permit to build the tower was issued on August 17, 2015.

=== Halt in construction ===
On August 24, 2015, the U.S. Securities and Exchange Commission (SEC) filed in a civil securities fraud complaint in the U.S. District Court against Dargey and Path America, the company managing the EB-5 financing of the Potala Tower project and several others in the region. The following day, Dargey's assets were seized, forcing construction on the tower to halt; by then, excavation had reached a depth of 60 feet (18 m) and PCL announced that it would stop construction. The SEC alleged that Dargey diverted $17.6 million of at least $125 million raised through the EB-5 program and misused them on himself, including the purchase of his Bellevue home, transfers between projects, and gambling at casinos as far away as Las Vegas.

In October, U.S. District Court Judge James Robart ordered that Path America and its assets be removed from Dargey's control and placed into receivership, including the Potala Tower project. A recovery plan was filed in January by the court receiver, proposing to sell all of Path America's projects, which Dargey and several investors opposed on the grounds of possible loss of EB-5 eligibility. United States Citizenship and Immigration Services instead revoked the Potala Tower project of EB-5 eligibility in March 2016, closing the possibility of granting green cards for project investors. The receiver was granted partial approval to sell the project in April; 13 bids were received for the property and/or project, including from local firm Vulcan Real Estate, Las Vegas-based Molasky Group, and Chinese developer Binjiang Tower Corporation (an original investor in the project). On May 20, 2016, Judge James Robart approved a plan submitted by the receiver on behalf of Molasky and Binjiang, committing $30 million to the project and allowing for construction to resume pending final approval by foreign investors; Dargey approved the plan after a deal was struck with the new developers to pay $1.8 million of the attorney fees he had accrued during the trial.

=== Resumption of construction ===
On October 6, Molasky and Binjiang signed an agreement to restart construction of the project, which would be renamed and rebranded. Work on the project resumed later that month, and is scheduled to be completed in January 2019. In February 2017, Molasky and Binjiang announced that the project had raised $325 million in funds to continue work on the project. The project was rebranded as "Arrivé" in May 2017 and was topped out the following year. The hotel portion, operated by Hilton Worldwide under their Tapestry Collection brand as The Sound Hotel, opened on February 12, 2019. The project's construction loan was retired in September 2021 and allowed to regain its EB-5 eligibility under a new financing agreement for $102.7 million by Gantry.
