= Nexus (building) =

High-rise residential building in Seattle, Washington

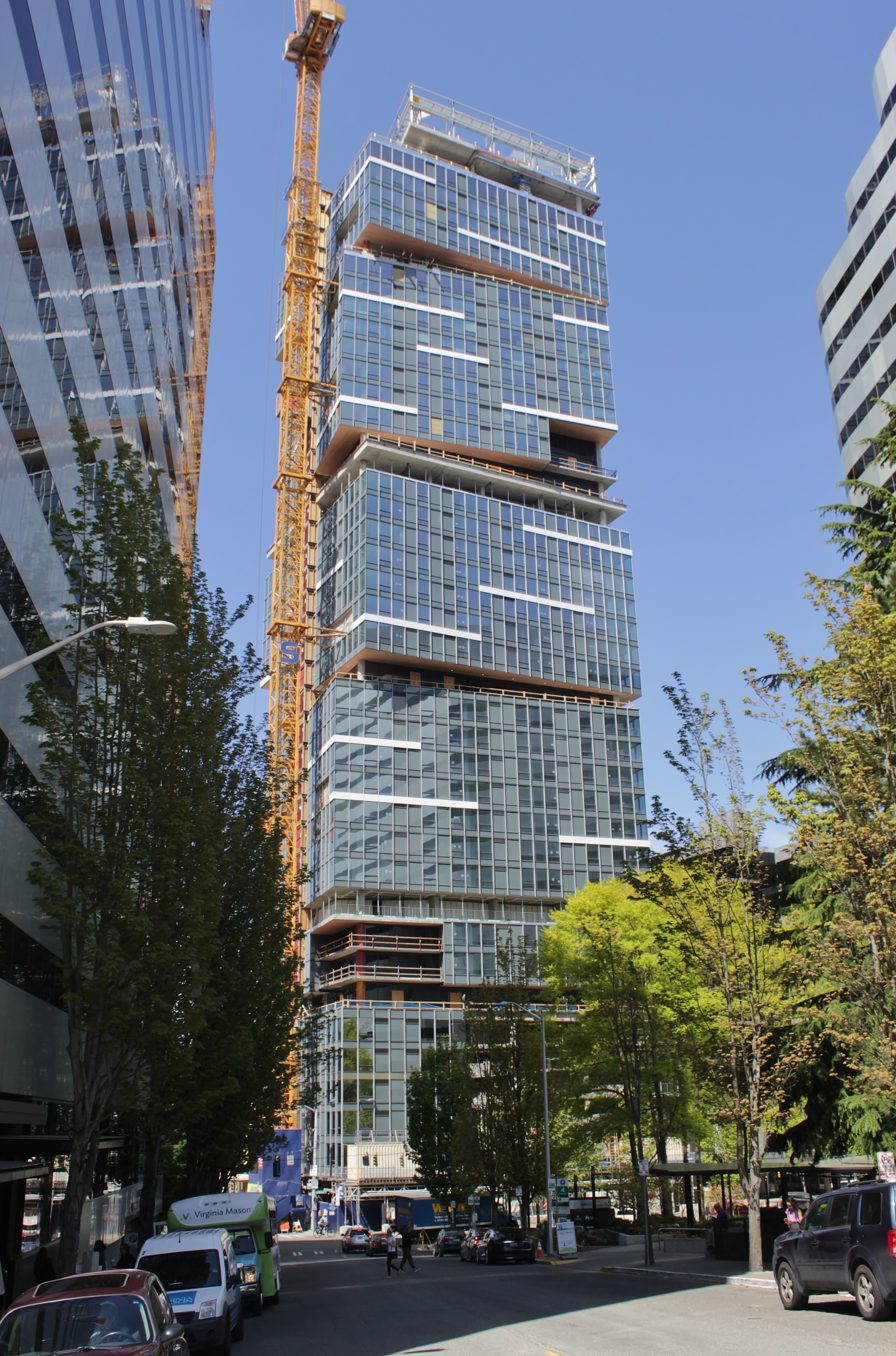
- Under construction in May 2019

- Location within Downtown Seattle

General information
- Status: Completed
- Type: Residential
- Location: 1200 Howell Street; Seattle, Washington, U.S.
- Coordinates: 47°37′02″N 122°19′50″W
- Construction started: March 14, 2017
- Opened: February 2020
- Cost: $151.6 million

Height
- Roof: 440 feet (130 m)

Technical details
- Floor count: 40

Design and construction
- Architecture firm: Weber Thompson
- Developer: Burrard Group
- Structural engineer: KPFF
- Main contractor: Skanska

Other information
- Number of units: 389 condominiums
- Parking: 316 parking stalls

Website
- nexusseattle.com

Nexus is a high-rise residential building in Seattle, Washington, United States. The 40-story, 440-foot (130 m) tower has 389 condominiums, retail space, and a parking garage for 316 vehicles. Nexus is located at 1200 Howell Street in the Denny Triangle neighborhood, adjacent to Interstate 5. The project, developed by Burrard Group, was announced in 2015 and began construction in early 2017. It opened in February 2020.

== History ==
Vancouver-based developer Burrard Group announced its intention to build a 41-story condominium tower at 1200 Howell Street, its first project in Seattle, in late 2015. The project was named "Nexus", referencing the tower's design as well as its location between South Lake Union, Downtown Seattle, and Capitol Hill. Burrard purchased the project site, a quarter-block surface parking lot, for $14.95 million in May 2016. Reservations and deposits for units began selling on June 7, with buyers camping out overnight and forming long lines at the sales office.

Construction was approved in December 2016, and a ceremonial groundbreaking was held on March 14, 2017. Sales for units in the building began the following week, resulting in 75 percent of units sold within the first few days. The building opened in February 2020 for the first set of new residents.

A temporary certificate of occupancy was issued by the city government in January 2020, with the remaining work later delayed by the COVID-19 pandemic and a statewide construction stoppage. Burrard filed a court complaint against Skanska and its subcontractors for late delivery of the project, valued at $4.7 million, as well as unresolved change orders and water damage during construction. Skanska filed suit against Burrard Group's 1200 Howell Street LLC for $20 million in damages and were awarded $19.2 million by a King County Superior Court jury in March 2022, pending a further ruling by the trial judge.

== Design ==
Nexus's design consists of a series of stacked boxes that are rotated in 8-degree offsets to create a "twisted" look. The tower, designed by Weber Thompson, uses the areas under the boxes for open-air terraces, as well as amenity spaces. Some corners of the tower are "eroded" and form two-story penthouse units that are located throughout the building. The rooftop has a lounge and view terrace for residents, as well as a private bar and restaurant.

The tower also includes retail space in its podium, as well as twelve stories of parking in below- and above-ground garages.
