= Weber Thompson =

Architecture firm based in Seattle, Washington

Practice information
- Partners: Scott Thompson (retired); Blaine Weber (retired); Kristen Scott; Amanda Keating; Jeff Reibman; Elizabeth Holland
- Founders: Scott Thompson; Blaine Weber; Jeffrey Hamlett
- Founded: 1987
- No. of employees: 70
- Location: Seattle, Washington, U.S.
- Coordinates: 47°37′14″N 122°20′15″W

Significant works and honors
- Buildings: Cirrus, Fifteen Twenty-One Second Avenue, Premiere on Pine

Website
- weberthompson.com

Weber Thompson is an architecture firm based in Seattle, Washington, United States. The firm employs over 70 architects and primarily focuses on high-rise buildings, interior design, and landscape architecture, also specializing in commercial office space, affordable housing and sustainable design. 17 of the firm's projects have earned LEED certification.

== History ==
The firm was founded by Scott Thompson, Blaine Weber, and Jeffrey Hamlett in 1987 as Weber Thompson Hamlett Architects.

In April 2008, Weber Thompson moved its headquarters to The Terry Thomas Building in Seattle's South Lake Union neighborhood;

During the late-2000s recession, the number of employees at Weber Thompson dropped from 94 in early 2007 to 54 by late 2008.

Scott Thompson retired in 2015, and was replaced by new promoted partners, Amanda Keating, Jeff Reibman, and Elizabeth Holland.

== Notable projects ==
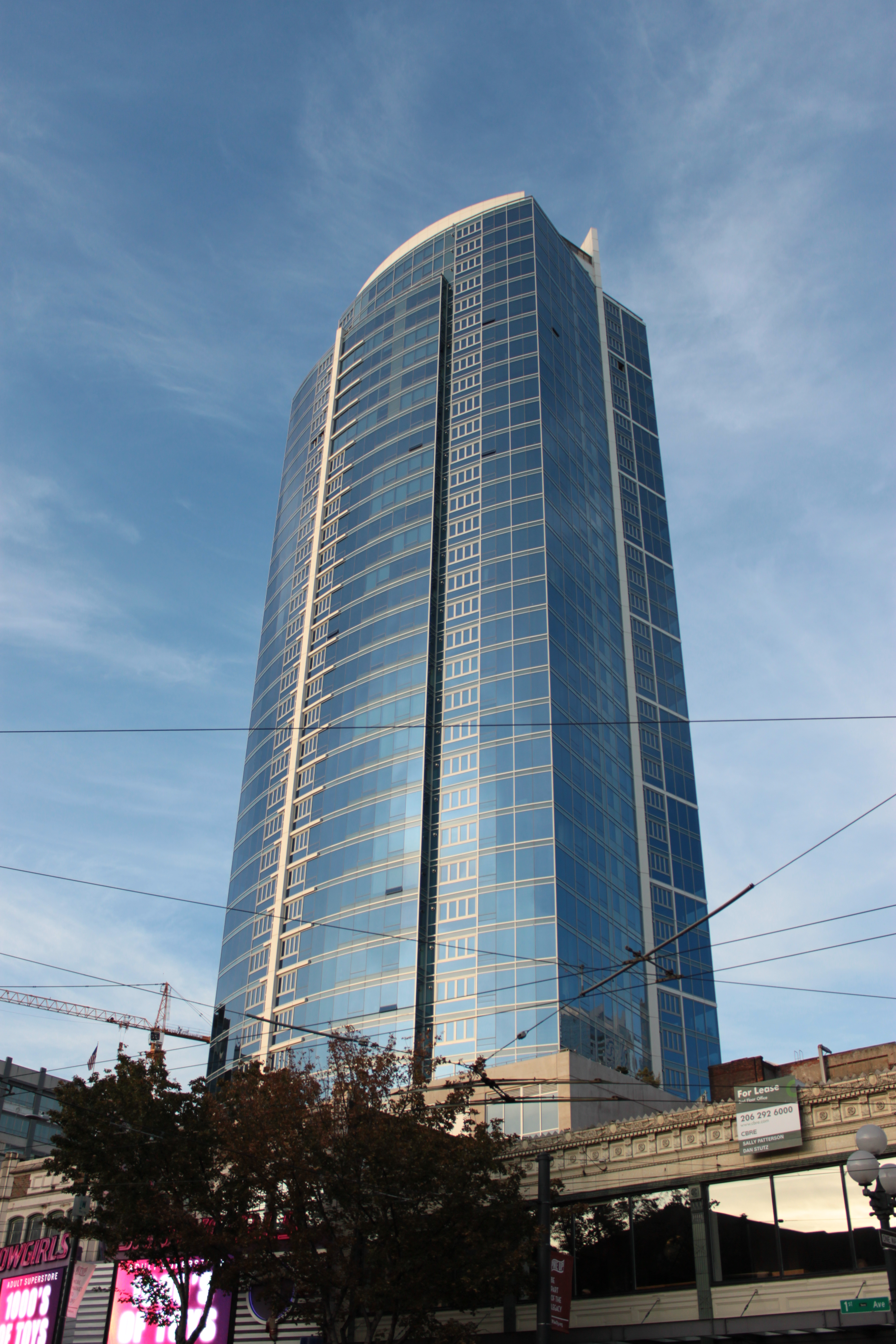
Fifteen Twenty-One Second Avenue, a residential skyscraper in Seattle designed by Weber Thompson

Completed high-rise buildings

- The Ayer (completed 2023)
- The Ivey on Boren (completed 2022)
- Nexus (completed 2020)
- Arrivé (formerly Cinema Tower and Potala Tower; completed 2019)
- Kiara (completed 2018)
- Stratus (completed 2018)
- Helios (completed 2017)
- LUMA (completed 2016)
- Cirrus (completed 2015)
- Premiere on Pine (completed 2014)
- Fifteen Twenty-One Second Avenue (completed 2008)

Other competed projects

- Raven Terrace at Yesler Terrace (Part of the redevelopment with Seattle Housing Authority) (completed 2016)
- The Terry Thomas Building (completed 2008)

Under construction, planned or proposed projects

- 8th & Pine

== Awards and recognition ==
Weber Thompson was named one of the top 100 U.S. firms designing residential projects in 2015 by Interior Design magazine.

Weber Thompson ranks 16th in the 2016 Building Design + Construction's Top 110 Multifamily Architects List.

Weber Thompson has been listed in the 2016 PSMJ Circle of Excellence, earning the firm a Platinum Award.

Weber Thompson listed among Architect Magazine's 2016 Top 50 firms in the nation.
