= Lawrence Denny Lindsley =

Lawrence Denny Lindsley (March 18, 1878 – January 3, 1975) was an American scenic photographer and also worked as a miner, hunter, and guide. Lindsley was a grandson of Seattle pioneer David Thomas Denny (1832–1903).

== Personal life ==
He was born Lawrence Denny Lindsley in a cabin at the south end of Lake Union in Seattle, Washington. His father, Edward L. Lindsley (1853–1933) came to Seattle via Panama in 1873. His mother, Abbie Lena Denny (August 29, 1858 – October 6, 1915) was born in her family's log cabin home in Seattle. His parents married on May 4, 1876. Lindsley had five siblings: Mabel Madge Lindsley (September 24, 1879 – December 26, 1919), Sarah Winola Lindsley (July 16, 1881 – ?), Annie Irene Lindsley (December 1, 1882 – ?), Norman David Lindsley (January 2, 1884 – ?), and Harold Denny Lindsley (1887–1887). His parents built a home at 25 Mile Creek on Lake Chelan in Washington.

Lindsley married his first wife, Pearl A. Miller, on September 20, 1918. They had one child, Abbie Lindsley, who was born and died in June 1920. Pearl also died in June 1920.

Lindsley married his second wife, Sarah Sonju, a color artist, on December 14, 1944. They worked out of a studio in their home until Sonju died in 1960. Lindsley continued to photograph into his 90s. He died in 1975 and is interred at Evergreen Washelli Memorial Park.

== Working life ==
In the spring of 1889, at the age of 11, Lindsley helped with the construction of his father's log cabin, known as the Denny Cabin. This cabin was built at the foot of Queen Anne Hill at the intersection of Temperance (renamed to Queen Anne Avenue North) and Republican Streets, and later relocated to the city of Federal Way. On June 6, 1889, just five weeks after this cabin was completed, he stood with one of his sisters on a hill overlooking Seattle and watched the city burn in the Great Fire.

In 1895, Lindsley went to work at the Esther Mines, near Gold Creek, Kittitas County and later worked on the first road along Lake Keechelus.

In 1903, he went to work as a photo processor and photographer for the W. P. Romans Photographic Company in Seattle. Lindsley owned part interest in the studio when it was bought by Asahel Curtis in 1910. This association led him to work for Edward S. Curtis, where Lindsley developed some of the color negatives (orotones), known as the "gold tones", for Curtis’ famous "Indians of North America" series.

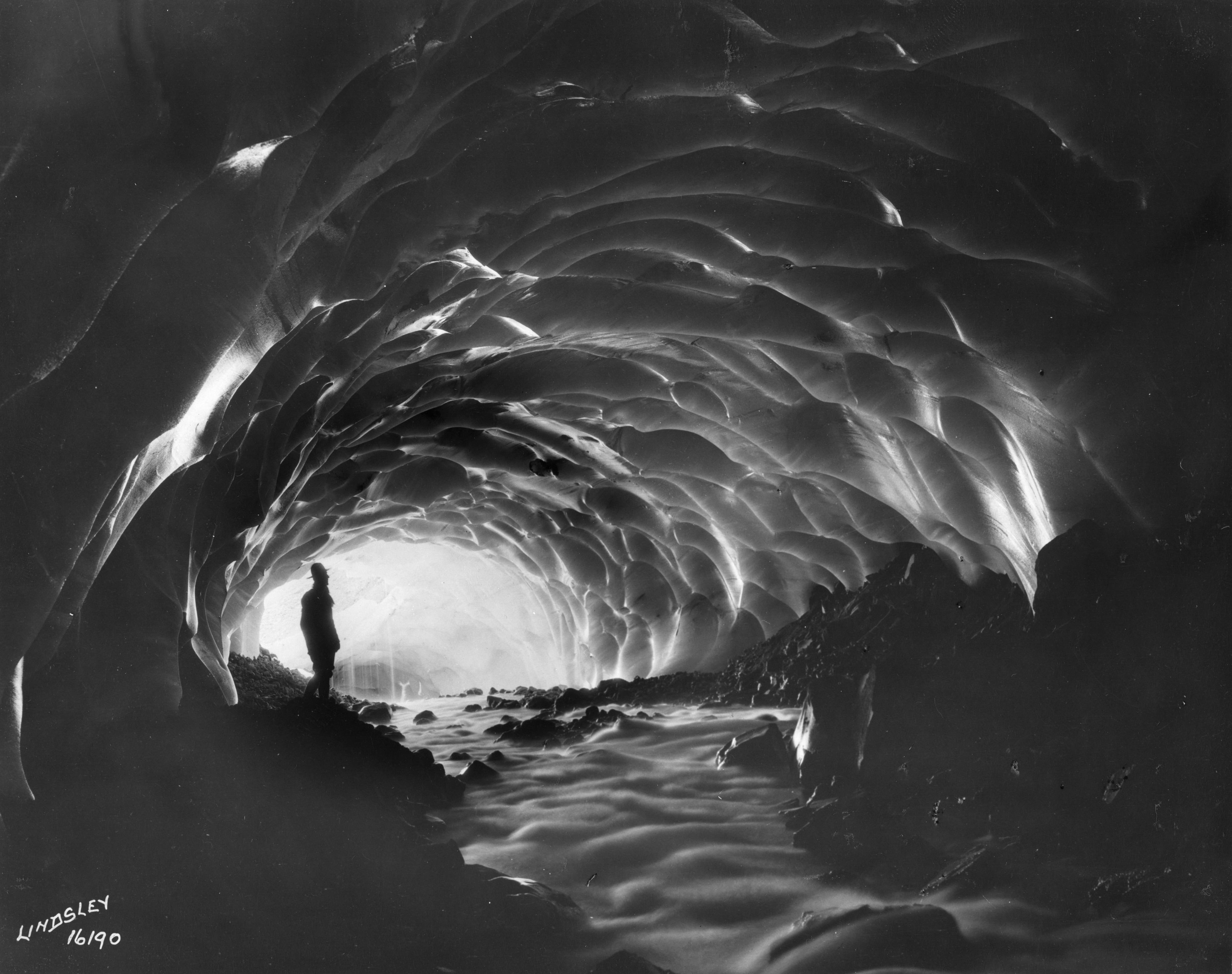
Exploring ice caves by Lindsley (Paradise Glacier, Mount Rainier, October 13, 1923)

As an early-day explorer of the North Cascades, Lindsley became a charter member of the Mountaineers club in 1907. He was honored in the June 1974 issue of the club's newsletter, The Mountaineer, in the article "The Club Salutes Lawrence Denny Lindsley".

In about 1907, Lindsley moved to Lake Chelan and lived at his parents' ranch. During this time, he was employed by the Great Northern Railway to photograph Glacier National Park for the railroad's tourist literature. In September 1916, Lindsley was hired by the Great Northern Railway as a guide for the party of author Mary Roberts Rinehart through the North Cascades. Lindsley figured prominently as "Silent Lawrie," a character in her account of the expedition, in a Cosmopolitan magazine article entitled, "A Pack Train in the Cascades," and later in her 1918 novel, Tenting To-Night.

When Lindsley returned to Seattle in 1916 he resumed working at the Asahel Curtis Studio. As he worked at the Curtis Studio, he continued his own landscape and nature photography throughout the 1920s, perfecting his technique of lantern slide photography.

== Bibliography ==
Lindsley, Lawrence Denny Papers 1870–1973, University of Washington Libraries.
