= Harry Delmar Fadden =

United States Navy Medal of Honor recipient

- Medal of Honor recipient
- Born: September 17, 1882; The Dalles, Oregon, US
- Died: February 2, 1955 (aged 72); Seattle, Washington, US
- Burial place: Evergreen-Washelli Memorial Park and Funeral Home Seattle Washington
- Military career
- Allegiance: United States
- Branch: United States Navy
- Rank: Coxswain
- Unit: USS Adams
- Conflicts: Spanish–American War; Philippine–American War; Boxer Rebellion
- Awards: Medal of Honor

Harry Delmar Fadden (September 17, 1882 – February 2, 1955) (a.k.a. Henry Delmar Fadden) was a sailor in the United States Navy who received the United States military's highest award for bravery, the Medal of Honor.

When he was nine Fadden traveled alone for 2000 miles to be with his father after his parents divorced. He later joined the U.S Navy and before turning 18 had fought in three wars and received the Medal of Honor for saving a shipmate from drowning.

== Early life ==
Fadden was born in The Dalles, Oregon September 17, 1882, but moved with his mother to Chicago, Illinois at an early age after his parents divorced. At age nine, he traveled 2000 miles by himself to live with his father in Sumas, Washington. His father had been a drummer boy during the Civil War.

== Military service ==
In 1898, Fadden joined the U.S. Navy and before his 18th birthday had served in the Spanish–American War, Philippine–American War, and Boxer Rebellion. While in the Navy, Fadden's commanding officers noticed that he wanted to read and encouraged him to learn how.

=== Medal of Honor action ===
When the USS Adams was sent on a training cruise off the coast of California Fadden was aboard as a member of the crew. By June 30, 1903, they had been at sea for two days and Landsman O.C. Hawthorne was a newcomer to the ship. Fadden was standing on the deck and had watched Hawthorne as he climbed a ladder to his station above. When the ship suddenly lurched as it was about to make a turn, Hawthorne was thrown from his position and hit his head on the railing before landing unconscious in the shark-infested water. Upon seeing his crewmate fall overboard, Fadden immediately jumped in after him. He swam to Hawthorne and held his head above water since he still had not regained consciousness. Fadden continued holding the unconscious sailor until the Adams was able to turn back for them.

For his actions in saving the life of his fellow sailor Fadden received the Medal of Honor one month later on July 31, 1903.

== Post military ==
After being discharged from the Navy on September 16, 1903, having reached his 21st birthday, Fadden lived in Seattle, Washington where he worked as a traffic analyst for the Port of Seattle. He was married and had four children.

Harry Fadden died February 2, 1955, in Seattle. He is buried in Evergreen-Washelli Memorial Park in Seattle.

== Medal of Honor citation ==
Citation:

On board the U.S.S. Adams, for gallantry, rescuing O.C. Hawthorne, landsman for training, from drowning at sea, 30 June 1903.

== See also ==
- List of Medal of Honor recipients
- List of Medal of Honor recipients during Peacetime
