= Alfred Lueben =

Alfred Bruno Lueben
- Born: December 31, 1859
- Died: December 19, 1932
- Known for: Conductor of the "Lueben Orchester" and Metropolitan Theatre Orchestra

Alfred Lueben (December 31, 1859 – December 19, 1932) was a German-born music professor and conductor in Seattle,.

Around 1889, Lueben immigrated to San Francisco with his wife Sabine, daughter Lillian, and son Alfred. He was active from 1890 to 1932 as a music teacher, church organist, choir conductor, director of his own concert band (the Lueben Orchester), retailer, and as a prominent Seattle citizen who helped lead the local German community.

A notable figure in Seattle's German community, Professor Lueben lead the Lueben Orchester in shows and dances. He directed his Seattle Liederkranz in a “Grosses Konzert, Oper und Ball” at Turn-Halle (Turner Hall) and “Grand Concert, Opera & Ball” was held at the Germania Hall.

Alfred Lueben was featured in a locally published 1906 book titled Men Behind the Seattle Spirit. When planning began for Seattle’s first world’s fair, Alaska–Yukon–Pacific Exposition, he helped organize the musical entertainment that would be performed for fairgoers on German Day, August 18, 1909.

In 1910 the Lueben began a costume retail shop in the Clemmer Theater building, and went on to rent tuxedos and dress suits. He and his son Alfred ran the store for many years.

Until his death, the Luebens never gave up music. He devoted many years to directing the Metropolitan Theatre Orchestra at a theater located at 4th Avenue and University Street.

In 1932, the day after one of the concerts he directed, Alfred Lueben took ill and was admitted to Providence Hospital. He died two weeks later on December 19, 1932. He was interred at Evergreen Washelli Cemetery in Seattle.
