= Brenden Foster =

American activist (1997–2008)

- Born: Brenden Stephen Foster; October 4, 1997
- Died: November 21, 2008 (aged 11); Bothell, Washington, U.S.
- Cause of death: Leukemia
- Known for: The Brenden Foster Food Drive

Brenden Stephen Foster (October 4, 1997 – November 21, 2008) was an 11-year-old boy from Bothell, Washington, diagnosed with acute lymphoblastic leukemia in 2005. KOMO, a local broadcasting station, reported the story of Brenden's last wish on November 7, 2008, which was to feed the homeless. The story inspired many, and prompted attention from national media such as CNN and the Associated Press, even drawing international attention.

The Seattle Seahawks NFL franchise paid for Brenden's funeral; he is buried at Evergreen Washelli Cemetery in Seattle, Washington.

== Local impact ==
The Brenden Foster Food Drive was created by the broadcasting station in his honor. In Seattle, volunteers from the Emerald City Lights Bike Ride passed out over 200 sandwiches to the homeless. Inspired viewers took part in the "Stuff the Truck" food drive in Brenden's honor, filling seven trucks of groceries and $95,000 in cash to benefit the Northwest Harvest and Food Lifeline.

== Broader impact ==
Brenden's story also reached KOMO's sister station KATU (Portland, Oregon), which reported actions inspired by Brenden in Los Angeles, California and Pensacola, Florida, among other places. At the Union Rescue Mission in Los Angeles, for instance, over 2,500 meals have been served in Brenden's name. His advocacy for the homeless housed in tent cities continues to be remembered. A Vietnam War veteran from Kentucky who lost his leg in the war was so touched by the story, he gave Brenden his Purple Heart. More than 2,500 meals at the Union Rescue Mission have been served in Brenden's name.

== See also ==
- Stephen Sutton – British teenager with terminal bowel cancer who raised millions for charity
