= Premiere on Pine =

440-foot tall residential skyscraper in Seattle, Washington

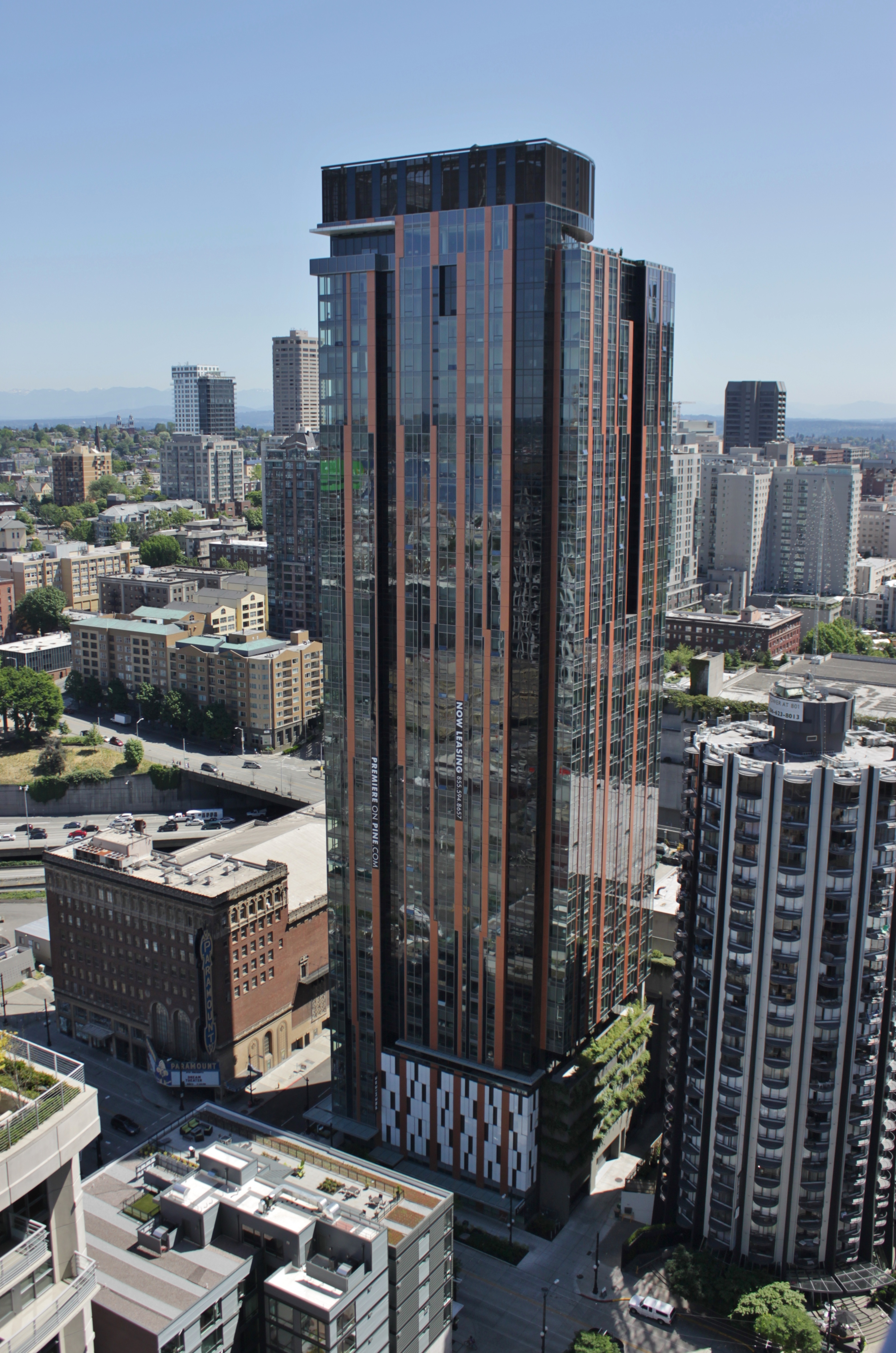

- Location within downtown Seattle
- Former names: 815 Pine

General information
- Status: Completed
- Type: Residential
- Location: Seattle, Washington
- Coordinates: 47.613201°N 122.332197°W
- Construction started: 2012
- Completed: 2014

Height
- Roof: 440 ft (130 m)

Technical details
- Floor count: 42

Design and construction
- Architecture firm: Weber Thompson
- Developer: Holland Partner Group

Other information
- Number of units: 386 apartments

Website
- www.hollandresidential.com/premiereonpine

Premiere on Pine (formerly known as 815 Pine) is a 440-foot (130 m) tall residential skyscraper in Seattle, Washington. The building, designed by Weber Thompson and developed by Holland Partners Group, has 40 floors and is located at Pine Street and 9th Avenue, adjacent to the Paramount Theatre and Convention Place station. Construction on the building began in August 2012, topping off in March 2014. Leasing began in December 2014.

As of July 2021, Premiere on Pine is managed & leased by Bozzuto Management Company

== See also ==
- List of tallest buildings in Seattle
