= Fifteen Twenty-One Second Avenue =

Residential skyscraper in Seattle, Washington

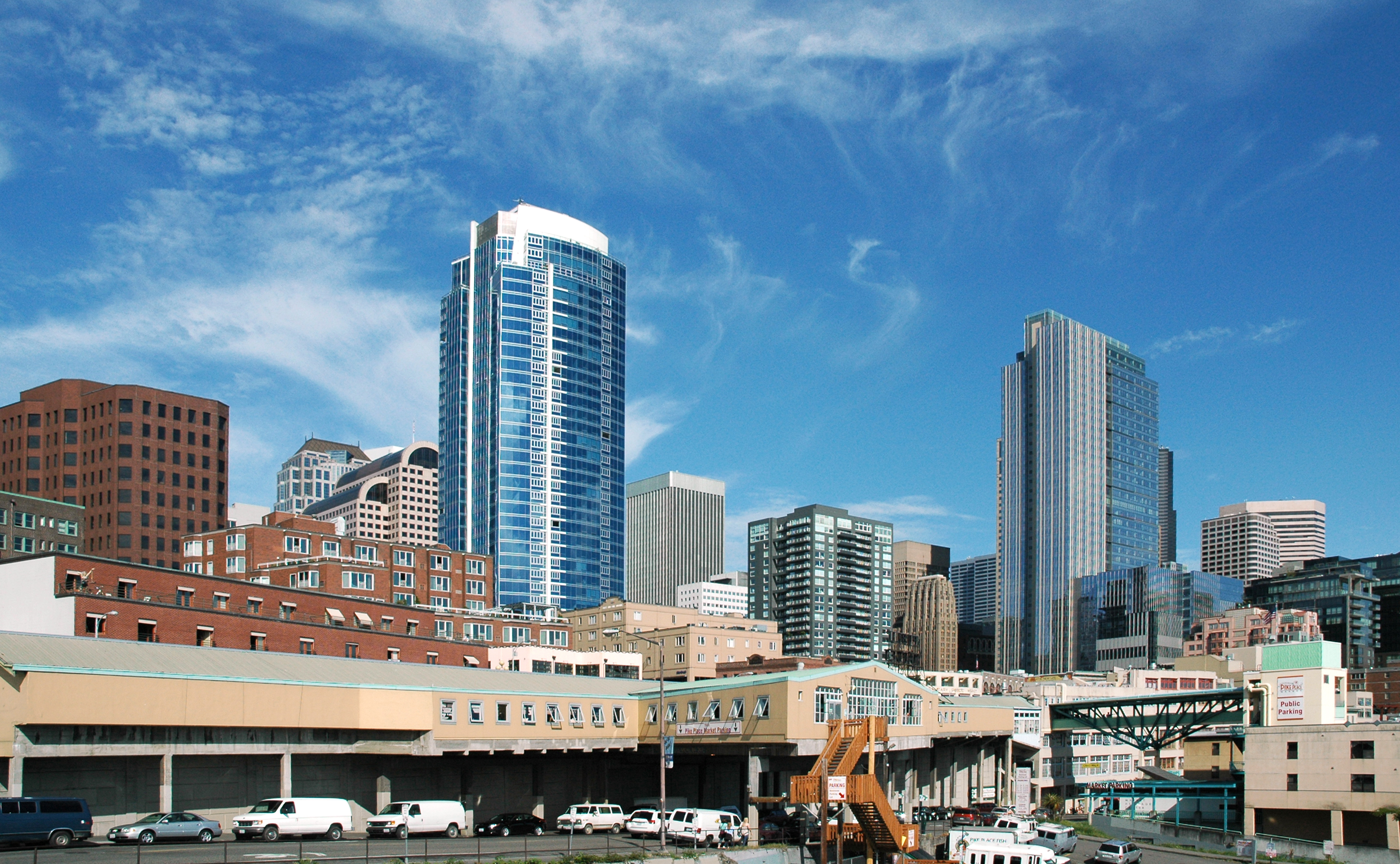
- Viewed from Victor Steinbrueck Park

- Location within downtown Seattle
- Alternative names: 1521 Second

General information
- Type: Residential
- Location: Seattle, Washington
- Coordinates: 47.6093°N 122.3395°W
- Construction started: 2007
- Completed: 2008

Height
- Roof: 134 m (440 ft)

Technical details
- Floor count: 32

Design and construction
- Architect: Weber Thompson

Fifteen Twenty-One Second Avenue (simply the 1521 Second Avenue) is a 134 m (440 ft) residential skyscraper in Seattle, Washington. Designed by Weber Thompson, the 38-story tower contains 143 individual condominium homes. It is located near the historic Pike Place Market. The residential tower broke ground on August 30, 2006. It was opened on November 24, 2008, while its construction was completed in December 2008.

In 2009, the building won the Pacific Coast Builders Conference (PCBC)'s Gold Nugget Awards for the "attached housing project (for sale), high-rise eight stories and over" category.

The building has a rooftop lounge and two outdoor chef’s kitchens and fireplaces.
