= Cirrus (Seattle building) =

Residential skyscraper in Seattle, Washington, US

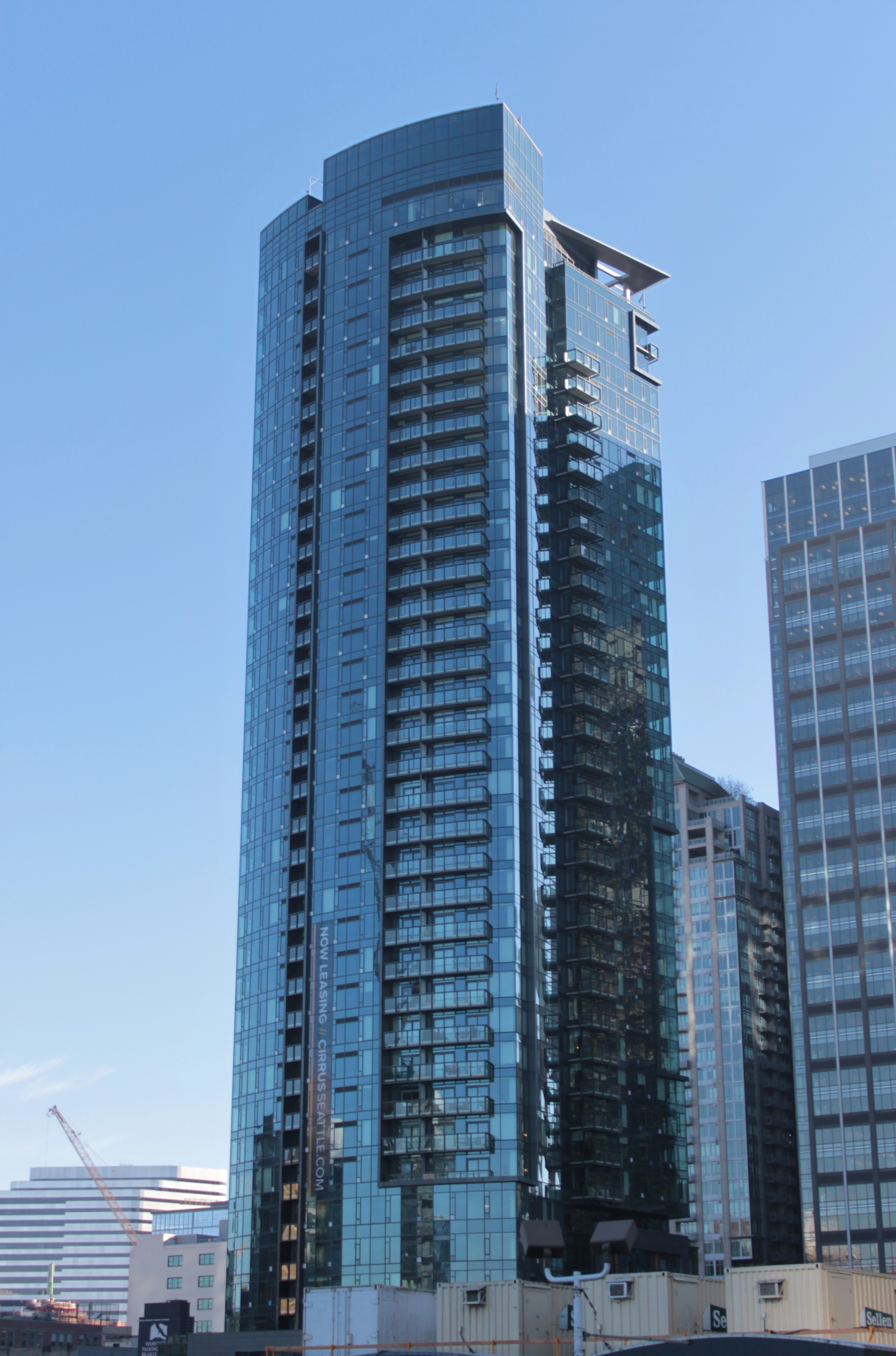

- Location within downtown Seattle
- Alternative names: 2030 8th Avenue

General information
- Status: Completed
- Type: Residential
- Architectural style: Modern
- Location: 2030 8th Avenue; Seattle, Washington
- Coordinates: 47.616516°N 122.337400°W
- Construction started: May 2013
- Topped-out: 2015
- Opened: October 2015
- Landlord: Windsor Communities

Height
- Roof: 440 feet (130 m)

Technical details
- Floor count: 41

Design and construction
- Architecture firm: Weber Thompson
- Developer: GID Development Group

Other information
- Number of units: 355
- Parking: 330 spaces

Website
- cirrusseattle.com

Cirrus is a 440-foot-tall (130 m) residential skyscraper in the Denny Triangle neighborhood of Seattle, Washington. The building, named after the cirrus cloud, has 41 floors and is located at the intersection of Westlake Avenue, 8th Avenue and Lenora Street. Construction on Cirrus, then known as 2030 8th Avenue, began in May 2013 and opened in 2015. The building was originally designed for condominiums but was reconfigured for smaller apartments by architects Weber Thompson after GID Development desired a move to the rental market.

The building opened in October 2015, with the average monthly rent for a 1-bedroom apartment at $2,903. GID Development has also developed a second apartment building named "Stratus" across Lenora Street from Cirrus.

== See also ==
- List of tallest buildings in Seattle
