= Stratus (building) =

Residential high-rise building in Seattle, Washington

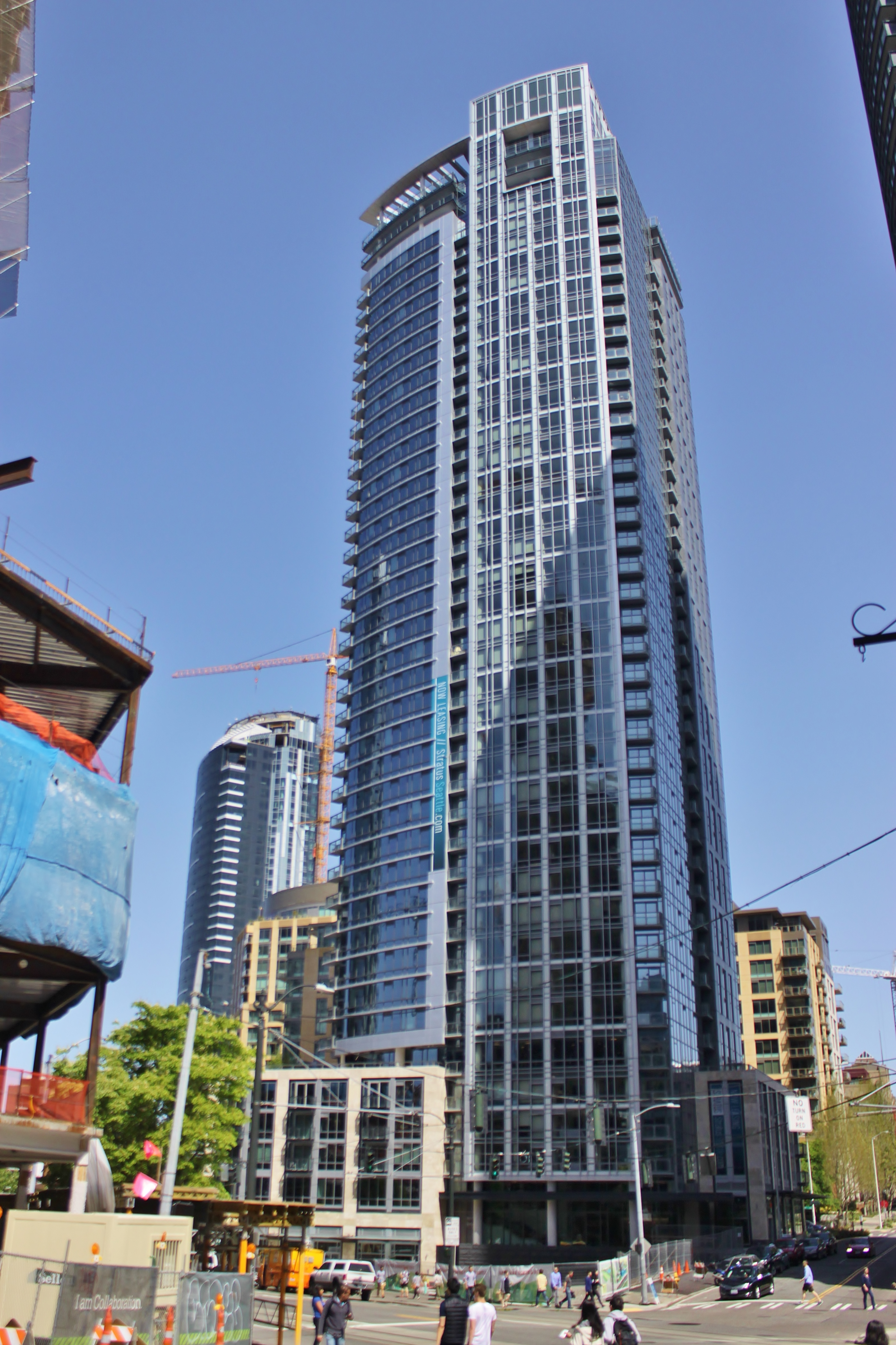
- Viewed from Lenora Street

- Location within downtown Seattle

General information
- Status: Completed
- Type: Residential
- Location: 2101 9th Avenue; Seattle, Washington
- Coordinates: 47°37′01.83″N 122°20′15.58″W
- Construction started: 2015
- Completed: 2017
- Cost: $100 million

Height
- Height: 440 feet (130 m)

Technical details
- Floor count: 43

Design and construction
- Architecture firm: Weber Thompson; GBD Architects
- Developer: GID Development Group

Other information
- Number of units: 396 apartments
- Parking: 238 parking stalls

Stratus is a residential high-rise building in Seattle, Washington. The 43-story skyscraper, located in the Denny Triangle neighborhood, was completed in 2017, with 396 apartments and ground-floor retail space.

Stratus is located across the street from Cirrus, another apartment building developed by GID that opened in 2015. Both buildings, designed by Weber Thompson, are named after cloud types stratus and cirrus, respectively.

== History ==
GID Development Group bought the 9th and Lenora site from Cornish College of the Arts in 2014 for $16 million. The group's proposal for a 41-story, 430-unit building on the site was approved by the Seattle Department of Planning and Development in March 2015. Construction began later that year and was completed in late 2017.

The lot was formerly home to a rental car facility; it was divided between Stratus and land donated to Seattle Parks and Recreation for the development of a new park. Urban Triangle Park was opened in September 2019 and features an open lawn and room for a future playground structure.
