= Leventhal =

Leventhal is a surname. Notable people with the surname include:

- Adam Leventhal (born 1979), British sportscaster
- Alan Leventhal (born 1953), chairman and chief executive officer of Beacon Capital Partners, Boston, Massachusetts
- Harold Leventhal (1915–1979), United States Circuit Judge
- Harold Leventhal (1919–2005), American music manager
- John Leventhal (born 1952), Grammy award-winning-guitarist, composer and music producer
- Norman B. Leventhal (1917–2015), chairman of The Beacon Companies
- Paul Leventhal (1938–2007), American journalist and nuclear nonproliferation expert
- Rick Leventhal (born 1960), American journalist, Fox News senior correspondent
- Stan Leventhal (1951–1995), American author
