= Emily Gherard =

American artist

- Born: 1979 (age 46–47); Phoenix, Arizona, US
- Education: Rhode Island School of Design, BFA 2002; University of Washington, MFA 2004
- Occupation: Visual artist
- Style: Drawing, printmaking, and sculpture
- Movement: Abstract
- Website: gherard.com

Emily Gherard (born 1979) is an American visual artist known for her process-based abstractions. Her artistic practice spans drawing, printmaking, and sculpture.

== Biography ==
Gherard was born in Phoenix, Arizona in 1979 and is based in Seattle, Washington. She received a Bachelor of Fine Arts from the Rhode Island School of Design (2002) and a Master of Fine Arts from the University of Washington (2004).

She is the recipient of several awards and fellowships, including a Joan Mitchell Foundation Fellowship (2021), the Louis Comfort Tiffany Foundation Biennial Grant (2024), and a MacDowell Fellowship (2024).

== Selected exhibitions ==
=== Solo ===
- 2023: Closer to the Bone, J. Rinehart Gallery, Seattle, WA
- 2021: Not a Billboard, J. Rinehart Gallery, Seattle, WA
- 2020: We Have Always Been roken, Oxbow Gallery, Seattle, WA
- 2014: Until the Well Runs Dry, Calypte Gallery, Seattle, WA

=== Group ===
- 2025: Women of the Pacific Northwest, Bo Bartlett Center, Columbus State University, GA
- 2024: Painting at Night: An Exhibition by Caregivers, Opalka Gallery, Russell Sage College, Albany, NY
- 2023: BIMA Spotlight, Bainbridge Art Museum, Bainbridge, WA
- 2022: Scale, J. Rinehart Gallery, Seattle, WA
- 2022: Dinner with Agnes Martin, The Vestibule, Seattle, WA
- 2019: Water’s Edge: Landscapes or Today, The Whatcom Museum, Bellingham, WA
- 2014: To Be Alone Together, Museum of Northwest Art, La Conner, WA
- 2012: Tenses of Landscape, University of Arkansas Fine Arts Center Gallery, Fayetteville, AR

== Public collections ==
- US Bank Center, Seattle, WA
- Crystal Bridges Museum of American Art, Bentonville, AR
- Swedish Medical Center, Seattle, WA
- Microsoft Permanent Collection, Redmond, WA

== Awards and recognition ==
- 2024: Louis Comfort Tiffany Biennial Grant
- 2024: MacDowell Fellowship
- 2023: Golden Foundation Artist Residency
- 2021-2025: Joan Mitchell Foundation Fellowship
- 2014: Grants for Artist Projects, Artist Trust, WA
- 2013: Finalist for The Neddy at Cornish, Cornish College of the Arts, Seattle
- 2010: Finalist for Betty Bowen Award, Seattle Art Museum, Seattle, WA
- 2006: Poncho Special Recognition Award, Seattle, WA
