= Carla Sands =

American businesswoman and diplomat (born 1960)

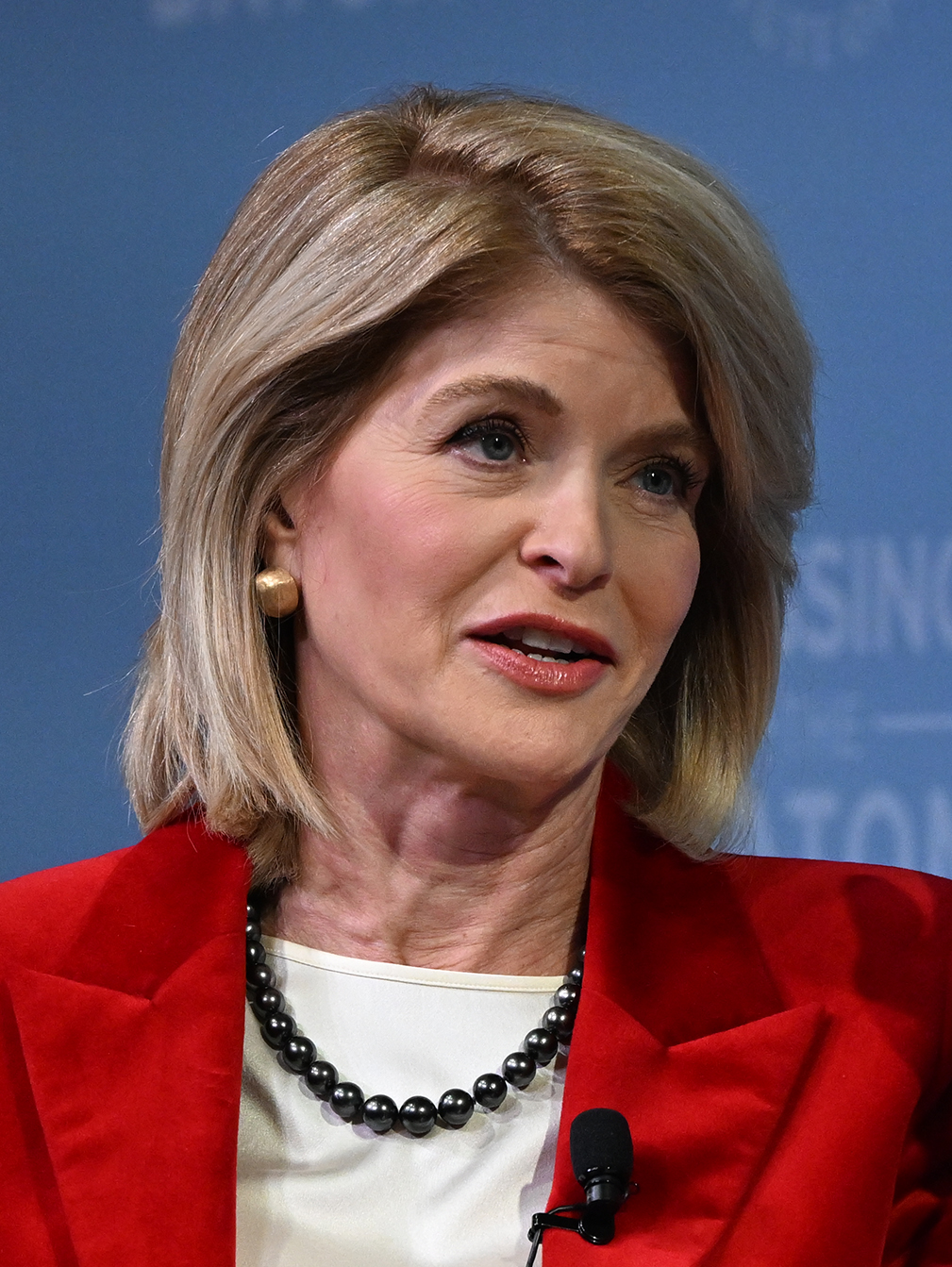
- Sands in 2025

United States Ambassador to Denmark
- In office December 15, 2017 – January 20, 2021
- President: Donald Trump
- Preceded by: Rufus Gifford
- Succeeded by: Alan M. Leventhal

Personal details
- Born: Carla Herd; October 13, 1960 (age 66) Mechanicsburg, Pennsylvania, US
- Party: Republican
- Spouse: Fred Sands (m. 1999; died 2015)
- Children: 1
- Education: Indiana University of Pennsylvania; Elizabethtown College; Life University (DC)

Carla J. Sands (née Herd; born October 13, 1960) is an American businesswoman who is chair and CEO of Vintage Capital Group. During the first Trump administration (2017–21) she was U.S. ambassador to Denmark.

A former chiropractor, socialite, and actress, Sands married business executive Fred Sands in 1999. Following his death in 2015, she succeeded him as chair and CEO of Vintage Capital Group. During Donald Trump's 2016 presidential campaign, she was an economic advisor to Trump and a major donor to his campaign and inaugural committee.

Sands was a candidate in the Republican primary in the 2022 United States Senate election in Pennsylvania.

== Early life and career ==
Sands was born Carla J. Herd, daughter of Jack (a chiropractor) and Barbara Herd, on October 13, 1960. She grew up in Mechanicsburg, Pennsylvania. Sands attended Cumberland Valley High School, where she was active in student council, the ski club, and various other student-led organizations. She studied art and science at Indiana University of Pennsylvania and chemistry at Elizabethtown College, but it is unclear whether she earned a degree from either institution. She later attended Life Chiropractic College, now Life University, and earned a Doctor of Chiropractic degree.

Sands had a brief career in acting in the 1980s, appearing in several episodes of the television series The Bold and the Beautiful in 1987 and in two movies, the 1988 sword and sorcery fantasy film Deathstalker and the Warriors from Hell and the 1989 South African action film Wild Zone.

Sands worked as a chiropractor in private practice from 1990 to 1999. On April 10, 1999, Sands married real estate mogul Fred Sands. Following his death in 2015, she succeeded him as the chair and CEO of Vintage Capital Group, which has around $150 million in assets, and of Vintage Real Estate.

== Politics ==
Sands is a Republican fundraiser and donor; she supported the 2016 presidential campaign of Donald Trump. In 2016, she donated nearly a quarter-million dollars and organized high-dollar fundraisers for Trump's campaign, and subsequently gave $100,000 to Trump's inaugural committee. Sands was previously an economic advisor to Trump; one of eight women that Trump added to his economic advisory council.

Sands was a California delegate for the 33rd congressional district to the 2016 Republican National Convention.

Several days after the 2020 presidential election, concerned about voter disenfranchisement, Sands wrote twice on Twitter that, according to Pennsylvania Department of State online voting records, her absentee ballot in Pennsylvania appeared not to have been counted. The New York Times, which later ran a search on Pennsylvania's election website with Sands's information, reported that the website had been updated and that her ballot had been received and counted in Cumberland County, admitting that it "is unclear when that information on the website was updated."

=== U.S. Ambassador to Denmark ===
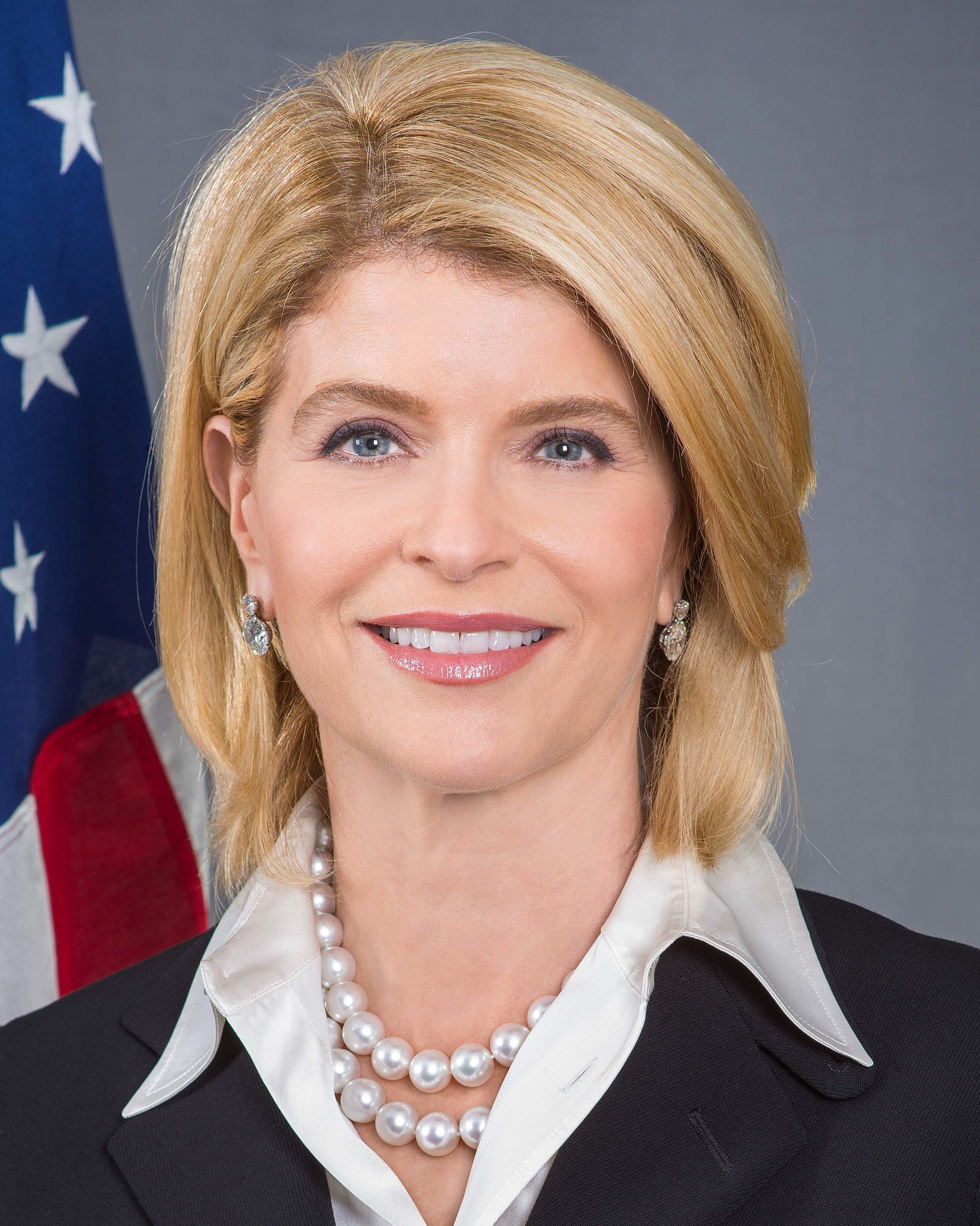
Official Ambassador to Denmark portrait, 2017

Trump nominated Sands to the post of U.S. Ambassador to the Kingdom of Denmark. She was confirmed by the United States Senate on November 2, 2017, on a voice vote. She formally assumed the office on December 15, 2017.

While serving as Ambassador, Sands published an opinion piece in Denmark arguing that the country spent too little on its military.

In December 2019, she vetoed the presence of Stanley Sloan, a scholar of the NATO alliance, at a subsequently canceled Danish Atlantic Council conference regarding the 70th anniversary of NATO. Sloan had been invited by the head of the council, Lars Struwe, to give the keynote address at the conference. The U.S. Embassy posted a Twitter message saying that the "proposed last-minute inclusion" of Sloan into the conference did not comply with the "agreement that we followed when recruiting all other speakers."

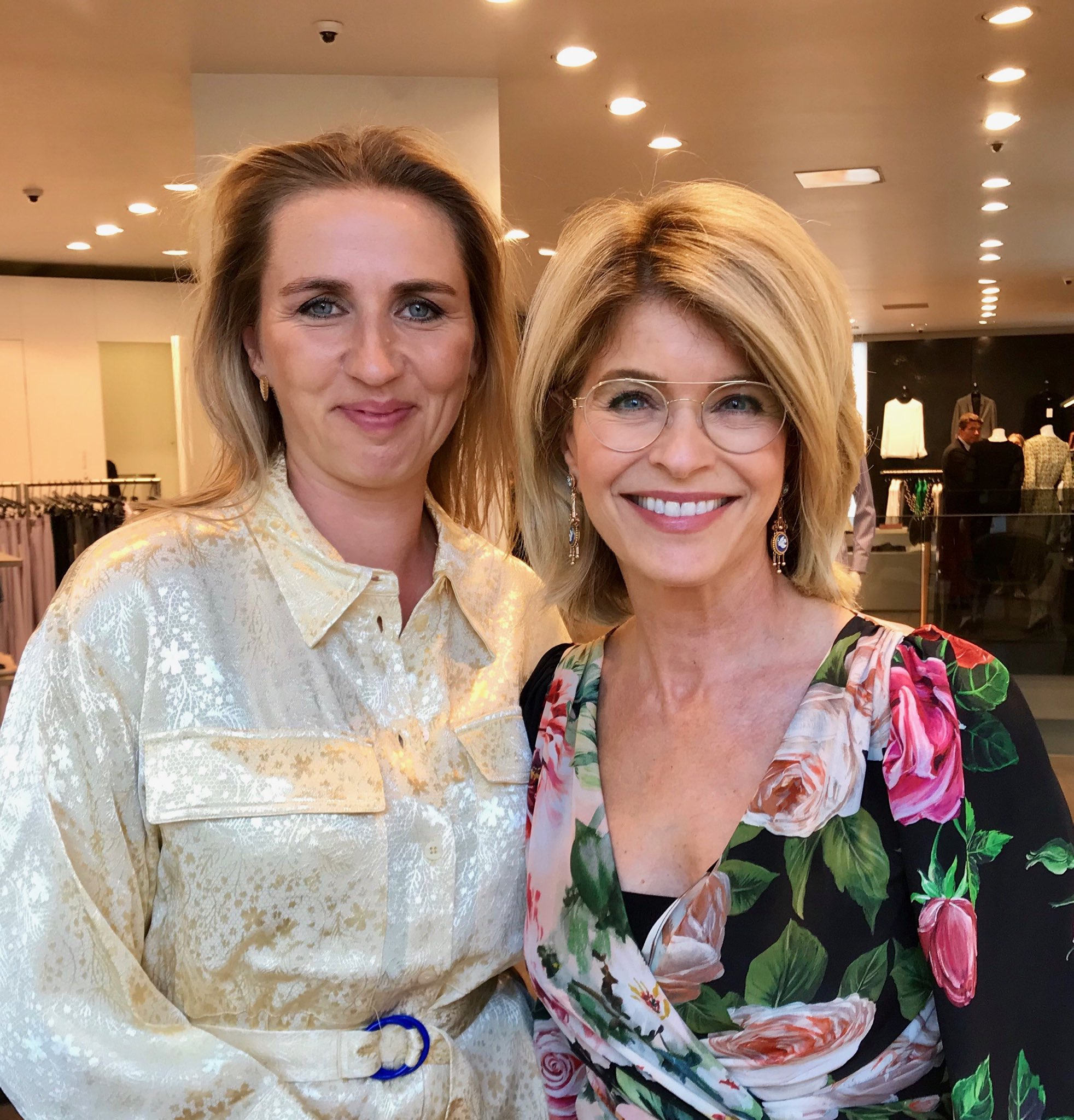
Sands with Danish Prime Minister Mette Frederiksen in 2019

In June 2020, Sands participated in re-opening the United States consulate in Nuuk, Greenland, along with Secretary of State Mike Pompeo.

The Office of Special Counsel ruled in February 2021, after Sands had left the role, that she potentially violated the Hatch Act of 1939 while serving as Ambassador to the Kingdom of Denmark by using her Twitter account to, in its view, tweet criticisms of Joe Biden and Kamala Harris. Sands' lawyers responded to the office, disagreeing with its interpretations.

During Trump's last month in office, Sands received the Medal for Distinguished Public Service from the Department of Defense for her tenure as Ambassador.

=== 2022 U.S. Senate campaign ===
In July 2021, Sands announced she was entering the Republican primary for the Senate seat of Pat Toomey. As of January 2022, Sands had put $3 million of her own money into her U.S. Senate campaign and had spent $1 million on television advertisements. Sands came in fourth in the primary, behind Mehmet Oz, David McCormick, and Kathy Barnette.

== Additional affiliations ==
Sands served on the boards of Pepperdine University, the Los Angeles Museum of Contemporary Art, the Library Foundation of Los Angeles, and the Los Angeles Philharmonic. She was also named by Governor Arnold Schwarzenegger to be on the board of the California Cultural and Historical Endowment. Sands served as the President and Chairman of Blue Ribbon, an organization that supports the Los Angeles Music Center and also as a Director of the Performing Arts Center of Los Angeles County.

== Personal life ==
Sands has one child, a daughter named Alexandra.

== Filmography ==
=== Film ===
Year	Title	Role	Notes
1988	Deathstalker and the Warriors from Hell	Carissa / Elizena	
1989	Wild Zone	Nicole Laroche	

=== Television ===
Year	Title	Role	Notes
1987	Houston Knights	—N/a	Episode: "Gun Shy"
1987	The Bold and the Beautiful	Alex Simpson	15 episodes
1987	1st & Ten	Tina Sawyer	2 episodes
1991	Monsters	Dolores / Creature	Episode: "The Maker"

== Electoral history ==
2022 U.S. Senate Republican primary in Pennsylvania
Party	Candidate	Votes	%
Republican	Mehmet Oz	420,122	31.2
Republican	David McCormick	419,182	31.1
Republican	Kathy Barnette	331,874	24.7
Republican	Carla Sands	73,345	5.4
Republican	Jeff Bartos	66,660	5.0
Republican	Sean Gale	20,262	1.5
Republican	George Bochetto	14,484	1.1
Total votes		1,345,922	100.0

Diplomatic posts
Preceded by Rufus Gifford	United States Ambassador to Denmark; 2017–2021	Succeeded by Alan M. Leventhal
