= U.S. Bank Center (Seattle) =

Skyscraper in Seattle

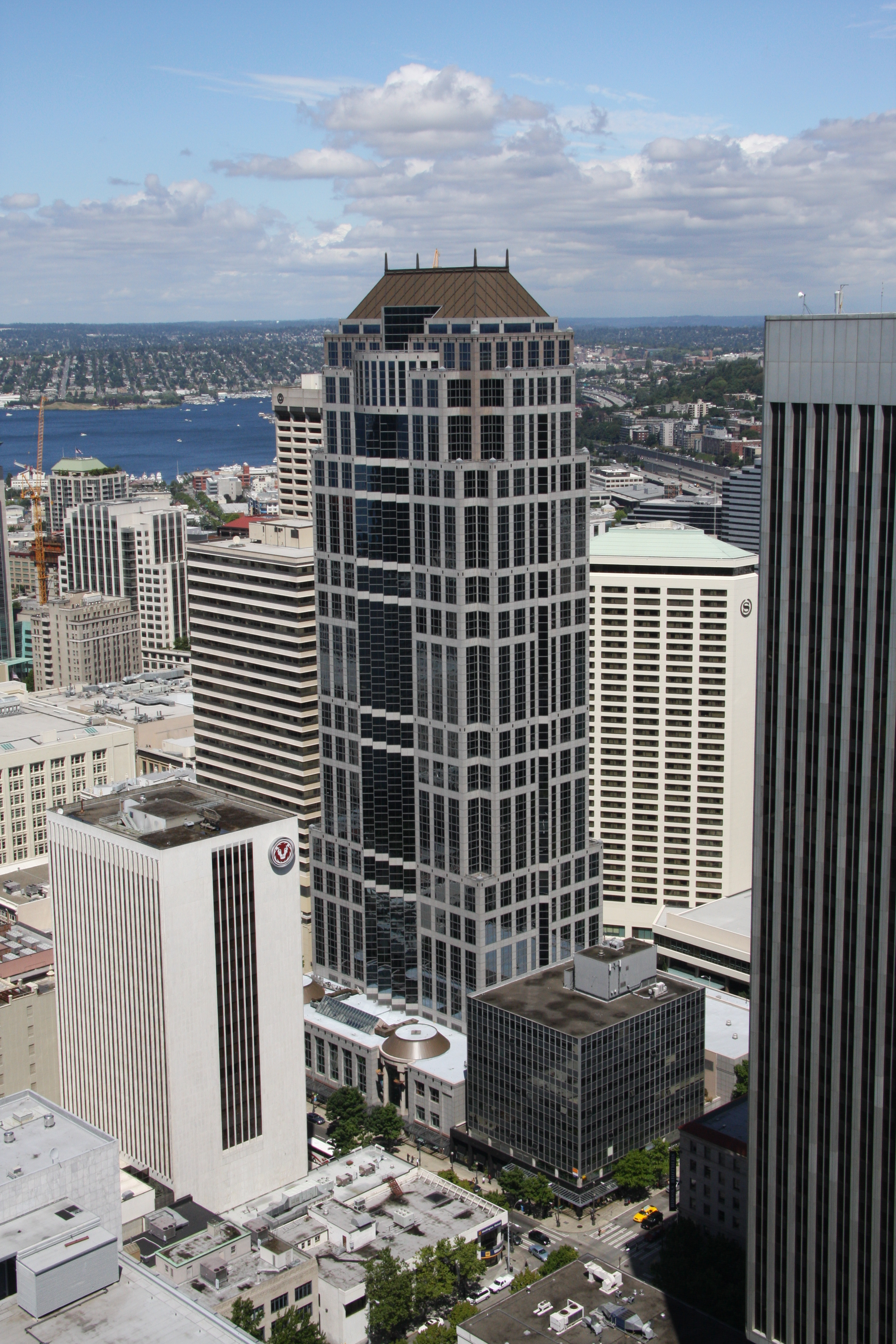
- The U.S. Bank Center viewed from 1201 Third Avenue

- Location within Downtown Seattle
- Alternative names: City Centre; US Bank Centre; Pacific First Centre

General information
- Type: Commercial offices
- Architectural style: Postmodern
- Location: 1420 5th Avenue; Seattle, Washington, U.S.
- Coordinates: 47.6106°N 122.3345°W
- Construction started: 1987
- Completed: May 30, 1989
- Owner: EQ Office

Height
- Antenna spire: 607 ft (185 m)
- Roof: 580 ft (176.79 m)

Technical details
- Floor count: 44; 8 below ground
- Floor area: 943,575 sq ft (87,661.0 m^{2})

Design and construction
- Architect: Callison Architecture
- Developer: Prescott Inc.
- Main contractor: Sellen Construction

Other information
- Parking: 989 stalls

U.S. Bank Center, formerly U.S. Bank Centre, is a 44-story skyscraper in Seattle, in the U.S. state of Washington. The building opened as Pacific First Centre and was constructed from 1987 to 1989. At 607 feet (185 m), it is currently the eighth-tallest building in Seattle and was designed by Callison Architecture, who is also headquartered in the building. It contains 943,575 sq ft (87,661 m^{2}) of office space.

== History ==
The site, between 5th and 6th avenues and bound to the north by Pike Street and south by Union Street, was home to the Music Box Theatre, the Windsor Hotel, and a jewelry store for several decades. A 46-story high-rise, named the Stimson Center, was announced in 1983 and would have been the third-tallest building in Downtown Seattle at 588 feet (179 m). The complex was slated to cost $200 million and include a major department store in a seven-story podium that would also encompass the largest parking garage in Downtown Seattle, with capacity for 1,200 vehicles to replace the garage for the Washington Athletic Club. The oval-shaped tower, designed by architect and co-developer John Graham & Company, would have had glass and light-colored stone cladding.

A street vacation was granted by the Seattle City Council in March 1985 after opposition due to its large size. The Music Box and adjacent Town Theater closed the following month. Financing for the project collapsed in late 1985 after several major tenants pulled out, including law firm Perkins Coie; AT&T was also sought as a potential major tenant, but they instead chose the Gateway Tower. By then, infighting between co-developers Graham and C.D. Stimson Company had escalated to lawsuits between the parties amid debts of $12 million. The development was bought out in 1986 by Prescott, Inc. and retooled into a 44-story tower that would initially be named the 1420 Fifth Avenue Building. The city council approved new plans for the tower in December 1986.

Tacoma-based Pacific First Bank announced in February 1987 that it would move 225 employees into the building, which was renamed the Pacific First Centre. Other major tenants included law firm Lane, Powell, Moss & Miller and Callison, the project's architect. Prescott later became the first Seattle developer to court a Japanese firm for financing when it partnered with the Hazama Corporation and later the C. Itoh & Co. Demolition of the site's buildings, which had sat vacant for years, began in August. Sellen Construction was the general contractor for the project. An ironworker died from a fall at the Pacific First Centre construction site on August 22, 1988; the Washington State Department of Labor and Industries fined subcontractor The Erection Company $24,500 for safety violations as a result.

The Pacific First Centre opened on May 30, 1989, amid an oversupply of downtown office real estate. It was 21 percent vacant by 1990 and the building's deed was transferred to financer Seafirst Bank in September 1989 to stave off a potential foreclosure. Prescott then re-acquired the building in December 1990. The Pacific First Centre included a three-story public lobby, shopping center with upscale retailers, and two-screen movie theater; the 23rd floor had a Montessori school and daycare, among the first in Seattle for a downtown office building. FAO Schwarz opened a toy store at the Pacific First Centre in 1995 and installed a 5,000-pound (2,300 kg) teddy bear statue outside the building at the corner of Pike Street and 6th Avenue. The store closed in 2004.

Pacific First was acquired by Washington Mutual in 1993 and planned to vacate the tower; U.S. Bank announced an eight-story lease and naming rights deal that was finalized that year. The bank began its move into the building, renamed the U.S. Bank Centre, in December 1993. The U.S. Bank Centre was sold to Bentall (later part of Ivanhoé Cambridge) for $236 million in 1998; a 50 percent stake was sold the following year to Emirati firm Emaar Properties for $130 million. The complex's movie theater took several years to become profitable and was operated by Loews Cineplex until it closed in February 2001.

The U.S. Bank Centre and Docusign Tower were purchased by EQ Office, a subsidiary of Blackstone Inc., in 2019 for $1.2 billion. In 2021, EQ announced a major, two-year renovation of the public lobby and shopping center, estimated to cost $70 million. The new commercial space, named "Cedar Hall", opened in June 2023 and comprises 155,000 square feet (14,400 m^{2}) across three floors. The building was also renamed to the U.S. Bank Center at this time.

== Design ==
The Pacific First Centre was designed by Gerry Gerron of Callison Architecture, who intended its lobby and retail areas to comprise an "indoor street" and a third place for the public. Its lowest three floors included a mix of upscale retail and restaurants as well as a Cineplex movie theater and chain restaurants. The lobby was described as "friendlier" than other Seattle skyscrapers despite its "elegant and posh" finishes, which included marble and granite between large windows. The skyscraper's crown is pointed and resembles an Egyptian obelisk.

=== Art collection ===
The public shopping area in the building's lower levels has a permanent collection of works by noted artists, funded by 1% set-aside of the construction costs. The collection includes Flower Form 2 by Dale Chihuly.

== See also ==
- List of tallest buildings in Seattle
