= Alan M. Leventhal =

American businessman and diplomat (born 1952)

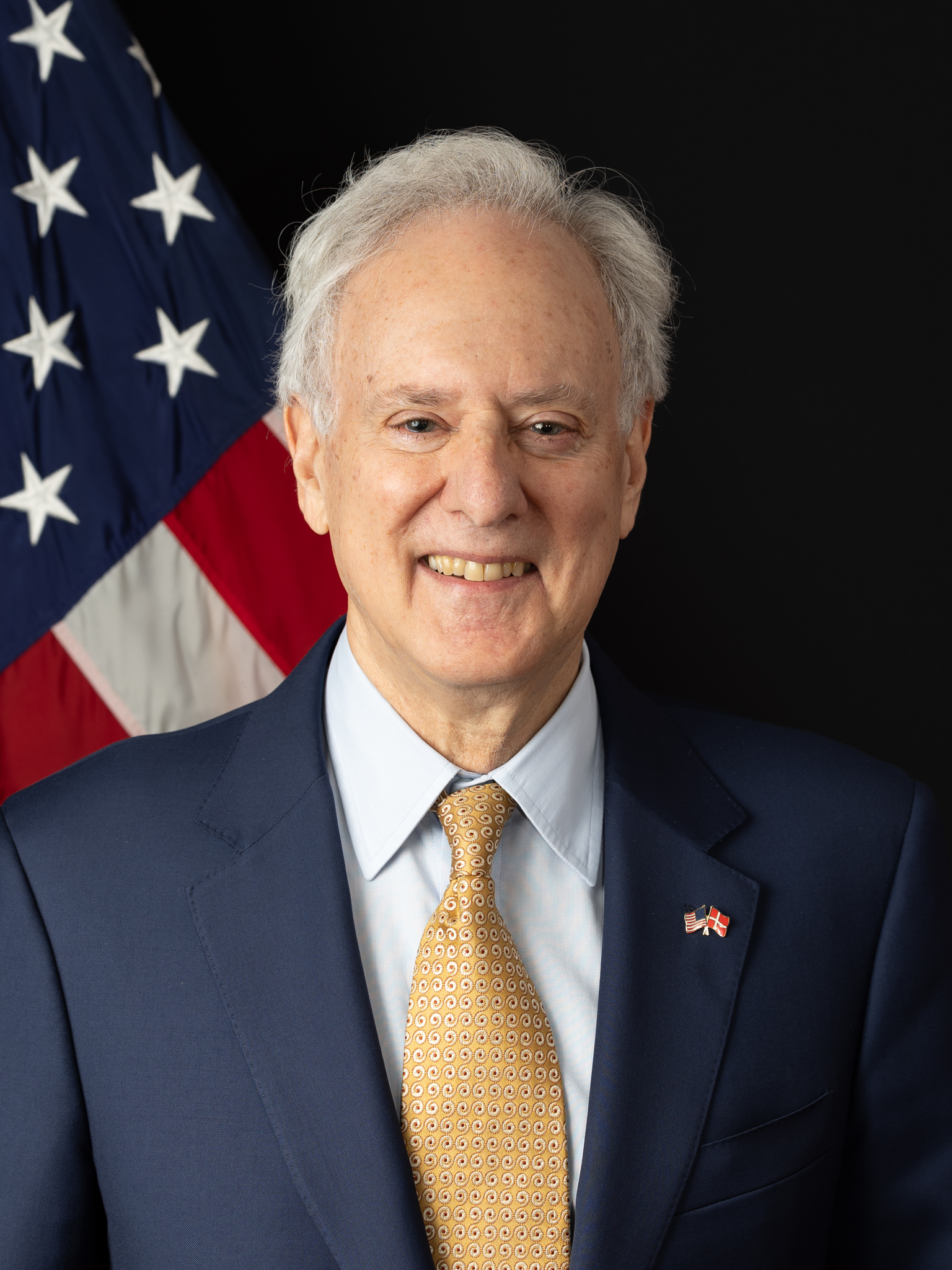

United States Ambassador to Denmark
- In office July 1, 2022 – January 20, 2025
- President: Joe Biden
- Preceded by: Carla Sands
- Succeeded by: Ken Howery

Personal details
- Born: July 28, 1952 (age 74)
- Spouse(s): Carol Gant Leventhal (divorced); Sherry Marcus Leventhal
- Parent(s): Muriel Guren Leventhal; Norman Leventhal
- Relatives: Irwin Marcus (father-in-law)
- Education: Northwestern University (BS); Dartmouth College (MBA)
- Occupation: Real estate investor
- Known for: Chairman of Beacon Capital Partners

Alan M. Leventhal (born 28 July 1952) is an American businessman who had served as the United States ambassador to Denmark from 2022 to 2025. He is the founder, chairman and chief executive officer of Beacon Capital Partners. Leventhal served as president and chief executive officer of Beacon Properties Corporation, one of the largest real estate investment trusts (REIT) in the United States.

== Education ==
Leventhal was one of three children born to a Jewish family, the son of Muriel (née Guren) and Norman Leventhal. He received his bachelor's degree in economics from Northwestern University in 1974 and a Master of Business Administration from the Tuck School of Business at Dartmouth College in 1976. Leventhal was chairman of Boston University's board of trustees from 2003 to 2008, a trustee of Northwestern University and an overseer of the Tuck School of Business. He has served on the board of the Pension Real Estate Association (PREA), the board of the Damon Runyon Cancer Research Foundation, and the board of Friends of Post Office Square.

== Career ==
Leventhal has lectured at the Tuck School of Business and the Massachusetts Institute of Technology (MIT) Center for Real Estate. Leventhal was awarded an honorary Doctor of Laws from Boston University on May 17, 2009.

=== Ambassador to Denmark ===
On January 19, 2022, President Joe Biden nominated Leventhal to become the United States Ambassador to Denmark. Hearings on his nomination were held before the Senate Foreign Relations Committee on May 4, 2022. The committee favorably reported his nomination to the Senate floor on May 18, 2022.

On June 15, 2022, the full United States Senate voted to confirm Leventhal to be ambassador in a 63–32 vote. He presented his credentials to Queen Margrethe II on July 1, 2022. His first official engagement was to speak at the 4th of July celebration in Rebild, 2022.

== Philanthropy and awards ==
Leventhal and his wife, Sherry, are philanthropists, who operate the Sherry and Alan Leventhal Family Foundation. They made a $5 million donation to Boston University. Moreover, his family has given $10 million to the Boston Public Library for the creation of the Norman B. Leventhal Map Center.

Leventhal was awarded the Realty Stock Review's "Outstanding CEO Award" for 1996 and 1997, and the Commercial Property News "Office Property Executive of the Year" for 1996. In 2004 he received Ernst & Young's New England Entrepreneur of the year award.

== Personal life ==
Leventhal has been married twice. His first wife was Carol (née Gant) Leventhal; they had three sons, Jeremy Nathaniel Leventhal, Alexander Leventhal, and Evan Levanthal. Leventhal is married to Sherry Marcus, the daughter of Dr. Irwin Marcus; they have two daughters and four sons in total.

Diplomatic posts
Preceded by Carla Sands	United States Ambassador to Denmark; 2022–2025	Succeeded by Ken Howery
