= EQ Office =

Real estate investment trust

- Formerly: Equity Office
- Company type: Defunct
- Founded: 1976; 50 years ago (as Equity Office Properties)
- Founder: Sam Zell
- Defunct: May 2025; 1 year ago
- Fate: Merged into Perform Properties
- Headquarters: Chicago, Illinois
- Website: www.performproperties.com

EQ Office (formerly Equity Office) was a real estate investment company that invested in office buildings. The company was owned by funds managed by The Blackstone Group. In 2025, it was merged into Perform Properties.

Notable properties that were owned by the company included 100 Summer Street, 1740 Broadway, 350 North Orleans, Docusign Tower, San Francisco Ferry Building, U.S. Bank Center (Seattle), Wells Fargo Center (Minneapolis), and Willis Tower.

== History ==
The company was founded in 1976 by Sam Zell. In 2003, the company gained control of the San Francisco Ferry Building.

In 2005, the company sold 5 buildings in San Francisco for $400 million.

In 2006, the company acquired half-interest in two Miami office buildings for $249.8 million.

In February 2007, after a bidding war with Vornado Realty Trust, funds managed by The Blackstone Group completed the acquisition of the company for $39 billion and sold 8 buildings to affiliates of Harry Macklowe for $7 billion. In April 2007, the company sold its portfolio in Washington, D.C. to Beacon Capital Partners for $6.5 billion.

In September 2013, the company acquired the Hughes Center, an office and retail development in Las Vegas, for $347 million.

In January 2014, the company sold 1-3 Center Plaza in Boston to Shorenstein Properties for $307 million. In April 2014, the company sold 28 State Street for $345 million. In December 2014, the company sold its portfolio in Silicon Valley to Hudson Pacific Properties for $3.5 billion. In 2015, the company acquired the Willis Tower for $1.3 billion.

In June 2018, the company changed its name from Equity Office to EQ Office. In 2019, the company purchased U.S. Bank Center and Docusign Tower in Seattle for $1.2 billion.

In May 2025, the company was merged into Perform Properties.
