= Fred Sands =

American business executive and real estate investor

- Born: Fred Charles Sands; February 16, 1938; New York City, U.S.
- Died: October 23, 2015 (aged 77); Boston, Massachusetts, U.S.
- Education: University of California, Los Angeles
- Occupation: Real estate
- Spouse: Carla Herd (m. 1998)
- Children: 2
- Website: VintageCapitalGroup.com

Fred Charles Sands (February 16, 1938 – October 23, 2015) was an American business executive and real estate investor. He served as the Chairman of Vintage Capital Group.

== Early life ==
Fred Charles Sands was born to a Jewish family on February 16, 1938, in Manhattan, New York City. His father was a taxi driver. He moved to Boyle Heights, Los Angeles, California, with his parents in 1945, when he was seven years old.

Sands was educated at Roosevelt High School. He attended the University of California, Los Angeles.

== Career ==
Sands established Fred Sands Realtors, a real estate company headquartered in Brentwood, Los Angeles, in the 1960s. Over the years, the company opened 65 offices in California. In 2000, he sold it to Coldwell Banker. The merger was managed by Lloyd Greif.

Sands headed two private investment firms, Vintage Capital Group and Vintage Real estate, both headquartered in Los Angeles. Vintage Capital Group invested in a variety of businesses and industries, specializing in turnarounds of distressed companies and bankruptcies. Vintage Real Estate and Vintage Fund Management were both wholly owned divisions of the Group. The company typically acquired underperforming shopping centers and renovated them. Among the firm's projects was SouthBay Pavilion, in Carson, California. Fred also owned radio stations and hotels in the past.

Sands was the original estate agent for Mulholland Estates, a gated community in Los Angeles.

Sands was a co-founder of the Museum of Contemporary Art, Los Angeles, and served as the Vice Chairman of its board of trustees. He also served on the board of trustees of the Los Angeles Opera.

Sands was appointed by President George W. Bush to the President's Advisory Committee on the Arts and a liaison to the Kennedy Center. He was also appointed by Governor Arnold Schwarzenegger to the California Arts Council.

== Personal life ==
Sands married Carla Herd in 1998. They resided in Bel Air and collected art. He had a son, Jonathan, and a daughter, Alexandra.

== Death ==
Sands died of a stroke in Boston, Massachusetts, on October 23, 2015, at the age of 77. His funeral was held at the Wilshire Boulevard Temple in Los Angeles, California, on October 30, 2015.
