= Nuveen =

American asset manager

Nuveen, LLC
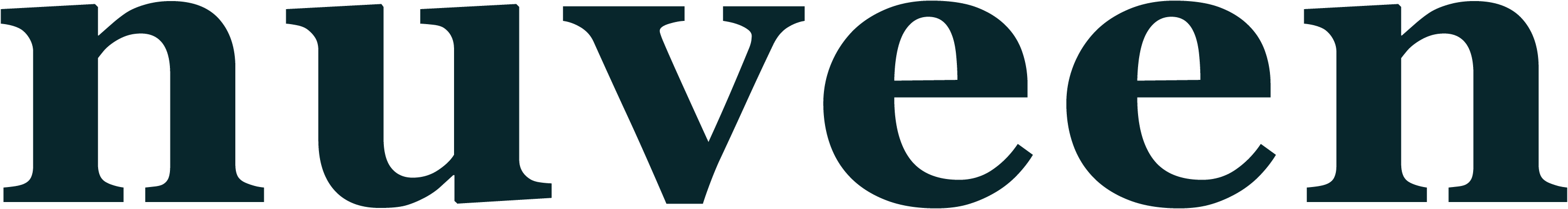

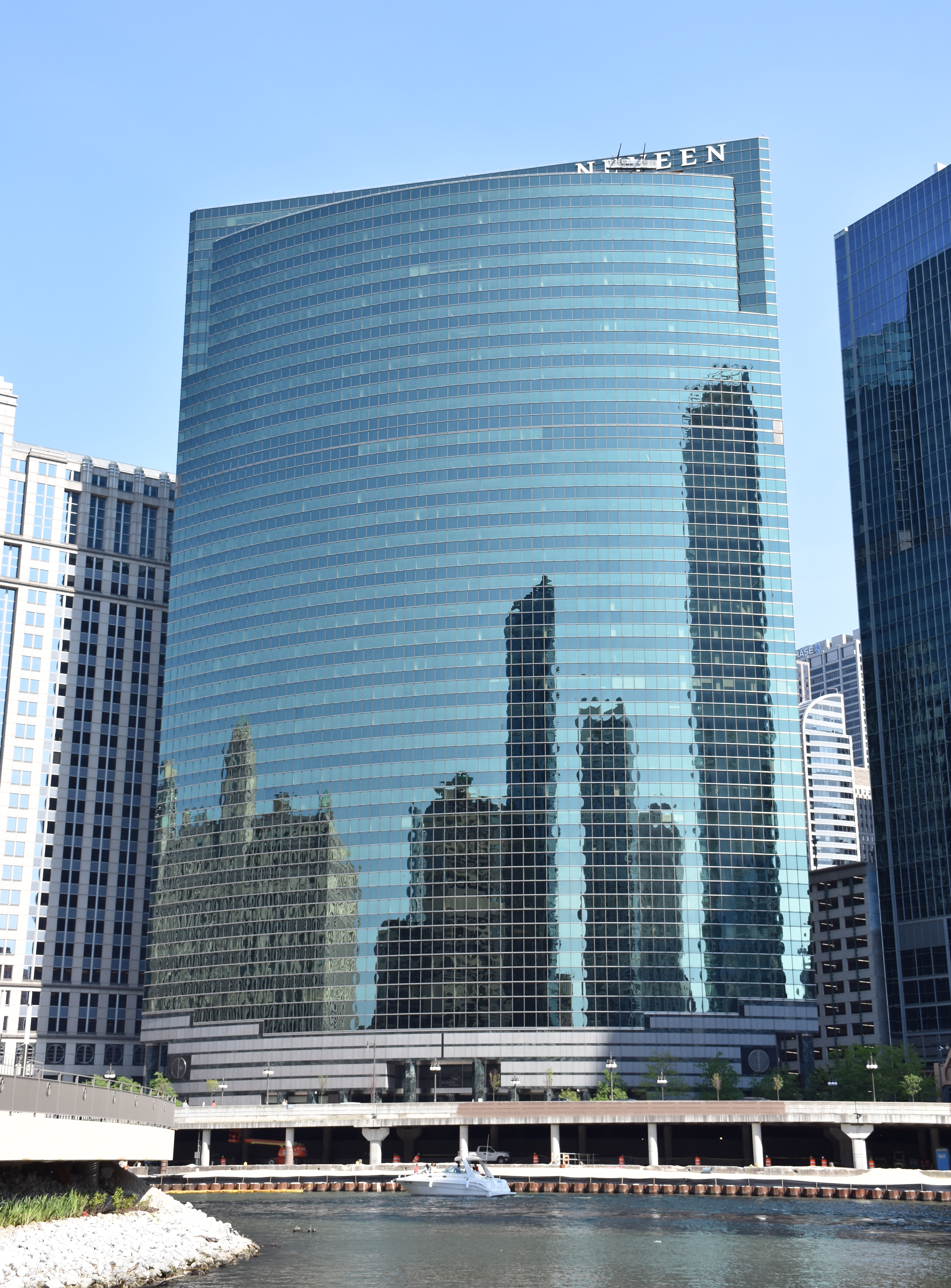
- Headquarters in Chicago, Illinois
- Type: Subsidiary
- Industry: Finance
- Founded: 1898; 128 years ago
- Founder: John Nuveen, Sr.
- Headquarters: 333 Wacker Drive, Chicago, Illinois, U.S.
- Area served: Worldwide
- Key people: Bill Huffman (CEO)
- Products: Mutual funds, Closed-end funds, Private equity, Hedge funds, Real estate, Separately Managed Accounts
- Revenue: ▲US$431.3 million (2019)
- AUM: ▲US$2.6 trillion (2026)
- Total assets: ▲US$6.2 billion (2020)
- Number of employees: 3,000 (2025)
- Parent: TIAA (2014–present); Madison Dearborn Partners (2007–2014)
- Website: nuveen.com

Nuveen, LLC is an American asset manager and wholly owned subsidiary of financial services organization TIAA, itself known for its legacy focus on managing retirement savings for not-for-profit institutions such as universities and their employees. As a consequence of integration efforts over the last several years, Nuveen (or branded sub-affiliates) now manage the entirety of TIAA's capital as well as all capital sourced from third parties. It is one of a limited number of non-sovereign money managers globally that have exceeded $1 trillion in assets under management (AUM) in recent years, and one of only a few that are not part of a larger organization offering retail or institutional banking at scale.

Nuveen was founded in Chicago, Illinois, in 1898 and originally focused solely on municipal bond underwriting and investments. While its investments today span nearly all major areas of capital markets, it is known for its size and influence in domestic fixed income generally, tax advantaged municipal bonds in particular and private real estate. The firm also runs several sustainable investing strategies that feature prominently in its marketing and media efforts.

The firm's three major offices globally are Chicago (headquarters of Nuveen proper), Charlotte and New York (headquarters of parent TIAA). Over a dozen smaller offices are maintained around the world to support regionally specific concerns.

== History ==
Founded in 1898, Nuveen Investments began as John Nuveen & Company, when founder John Nuveen, Sr. created the firm as an investment banking company specializing in the underwriting and distribution of municipal bonds. The first bond it underwrote was for a Minnesota water company. After World War II, John Nuveen, Jr. helped with the Marshall Plan administration.

In 1969, it was purchased by Investors Diversified Services (IDS). In 1974, the company was sold to The St. Paul Companies. It was privatised in 2007 after being acquired by a private equity group led by Madison Dearborn Partners for $5.4 billion. Following turbulence of both the 2008 financial crisis and the European debt crisis and in the face of increasing consolidation in the financial services industry, Nuveen merged with current parent TIAA and has since taken over the entirety of its investment operations.

Nuveen came under criticism during 2008 for its involvement in the auction rate securities auction failures, during which assets held in Nuveen's closed-end funds, totaling $15 billion, became illiquid. Those funds had two share classes: auction-rate preferred shares that hold first claim on the underlying assets (and pay income at rates set in weekly auctions), and common shares that typically pay higher income in exchange for greater risk of loss of principal. During the auction failures, while common shareholders suffered worse than preferred shareholders in terms of principal losses, they were able to sell their shares on the NYSE while preferred shareholders had no market in which to sell. In response, Nuveen posted a "Nuveen Auction Rate Preferred Resource Center" to inform its investors of its plans to borrow money to pay them back. The company later set refinancing for $2.7 Billion in taxable auction-rate preferred shares and has placed $500 Million of VRDP refinancing for its municipal auction rate preferred shares.

Nuveen is among the signatories of the "Principles for a Responsible Civilian Firearms Industry," which seeks to engage firearms manufacturers, dealers, and retailers in promoting gun safety.

In October 2022, Nuveen agreed to buy Europe's largest private lender, Arcmont Asset Management, for over US$1 billion. Following completion, the company plans to form a new unit called Nuveen Private Capital, which will include Arcmont and Churchill Asset Management businesses.

In February 2026, Nuveen agreed to acquire British asset manager Schroders for $13.5 billion.

The acquisition was finalized October 1, 2026. Creating an investment management group with more than $2.6 trillion in assets under management.

== Sponsorships ==
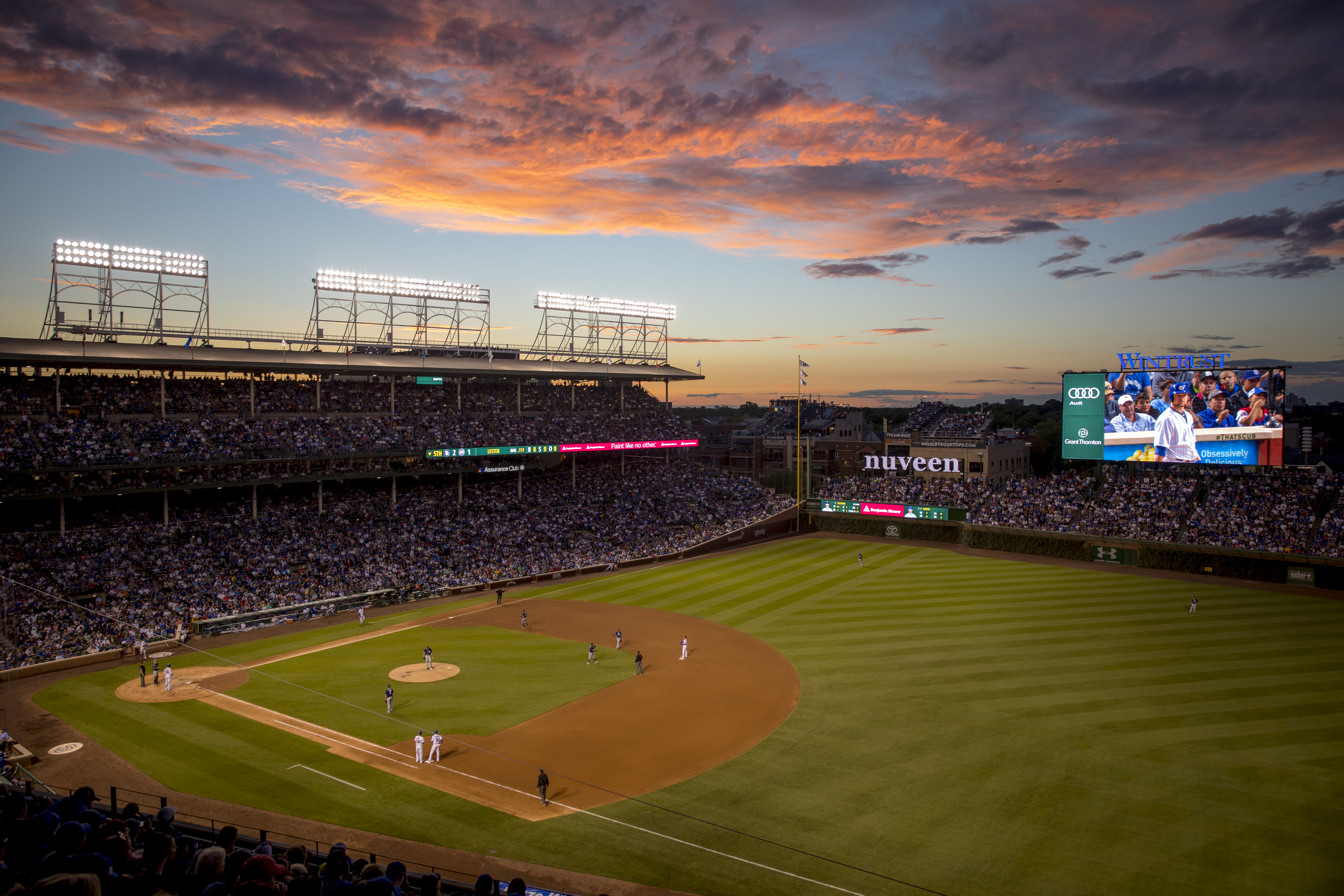
Nuveen sign at Wrigley Field, Chicago Cubs, 2017

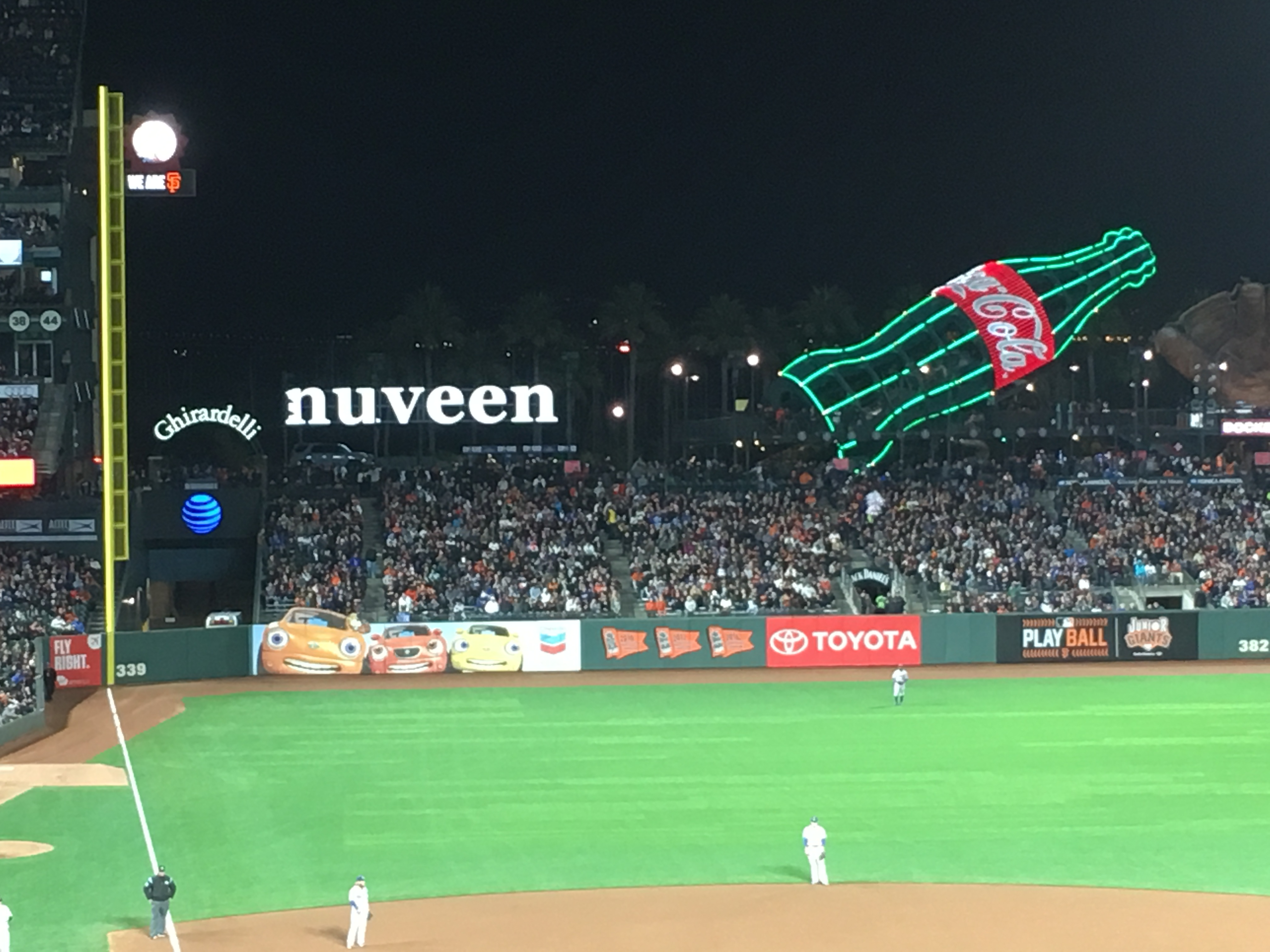
Nuveen sign at AT&T Park, San Francisco Giants, 2017

In recent advertising efforts, Nuveen showcased its long-standing and continued support for the Chicago Cubs with the "Nuveen Sign" in Wrigley Field. In April 2016, the 513-square-foot sign was installed beyond the left field bleacher section. The Nuveen sign is 57 feet wide with letters that are nine feet high.

In 2017, the Nuveen Sign expanded to AT&T Park. The Nuveen Sign frames the newly renovated Fan Lot.

In January 2026, Nuveen was signed as the official asset management partner of Williams F1 Team.

== Acquisitions & Mergers ==
Below are detailed the mergers and acquisitions by Nuveen LLC since its merger with TIAA on October 1^{st}, 2014. (To be updated)

Number	Acquisition date	Company	Country	Used as or integrated with	Ref
1	October 1, 2026	Schroders	United Kingdom	Wealth Management	See below
