= 333 Wacker Drive =

Office skyscraper in Chicago, Illinois

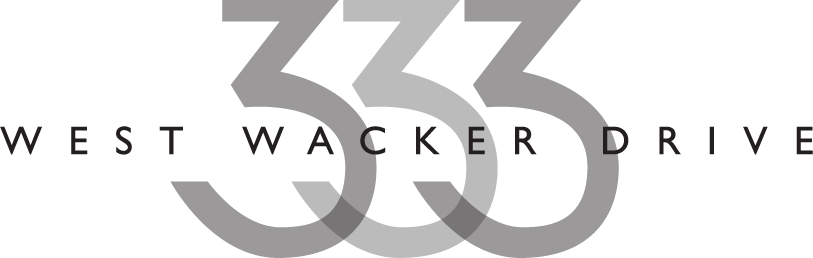

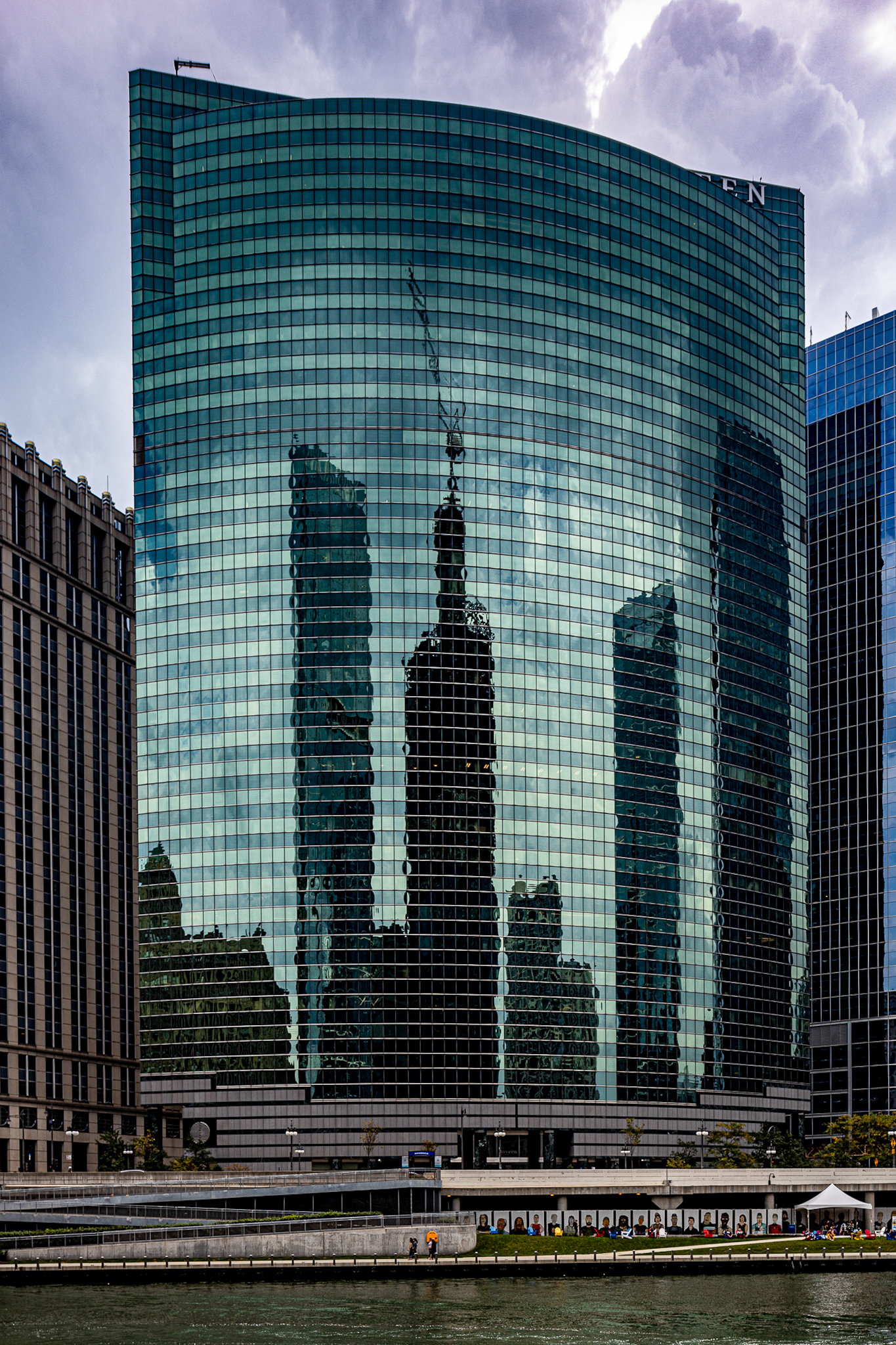
- 333 Wacker Drive in 2021

- Location within Chicago metropolitan area Location within Illinois Location within the United States

General information
- Type: Commercial offices
- Location: 333 Wacker Drive; Chicago, Illinois
- Coordinates: 41.8861°N 87.6358°W
- Current tenants: Nuveen Investments; Aetna Insurance; RedRidge Finance Group; ExWorks Capital; Capgemini
- Construction started: 1979
- Completed: 1983
- Owner: Hines Interests Limited Partnership
- Operator: Hines Interests Limited Partnership

Height
- Roof: 149 m (489 ft)

Technical details
- Floor count: 36
- Floor area: 864,200 sq ft (80,290 m^{2})

Design and construction
- Architects: Kohn Pedersen Fox; HKS

Website
- 333ww.tenanthandbooks.com

333 West Wacker Drive is a high-rise office building in Chicago, Illinois owned by Beacon Capital Partners. It is noted for its reflection of the curves of the Chicago River on its river-facing side. The building has 36 stories.

== Design features ==
On the side facing the Chicago River, the building features a curved green glass façade, while on the other side the building adheres to the usual rectangular street grid. This results in its "slice of pie" shape. The glass reflects both the sky and the river flowing next to it. The architecture firm Kohn Pedersen Fox Associates who designed 333 also designed the high-rise buildings 225 W Wacker to the east, and 191 N Wacker Drive to the south.

The building marks the division between North Wacker Drive and West Wacker Drive as the street makes a 90 degree turn. Based on the Chicago grid system for street numbers, if the building had been given an address on North Wacker, the street number would have been an odd number between 200 and 300.

== History ==
Work on 333 Wacker Drive began in 1979. The surrounding property was neglected which inspired Pederson to start construction. The building was completed in 1983.

In April 2006, Hines, on behalf of their U.S. Core Office Fund, L.P., acquired 333 Wacker Drive. Hines sold its interest in the asset to PNC Realty Advisors in November 2015. On June 20, 2024, AFL-CIO sold the property to Beacon Capital Partners.

== In popular culture ==
333 Wacker Drive was featured in the 1986 movie Ferris Bueller's Day Off as the building containing Ferris Bueller's father's offices, and was voted "Favorite Building" by the readers of The Chicago Tribune in 1995. In celebration of the 2018 Illinois Bicentennial, the 333 W. Wacker Drive building was selected as one of the Illinois 200 Great Places by the American Institute of Architects Illinois component (AIA Illinois).

The building is used for exterior shots of Crows Security headquarters in Batwoman.

== Gallery ==
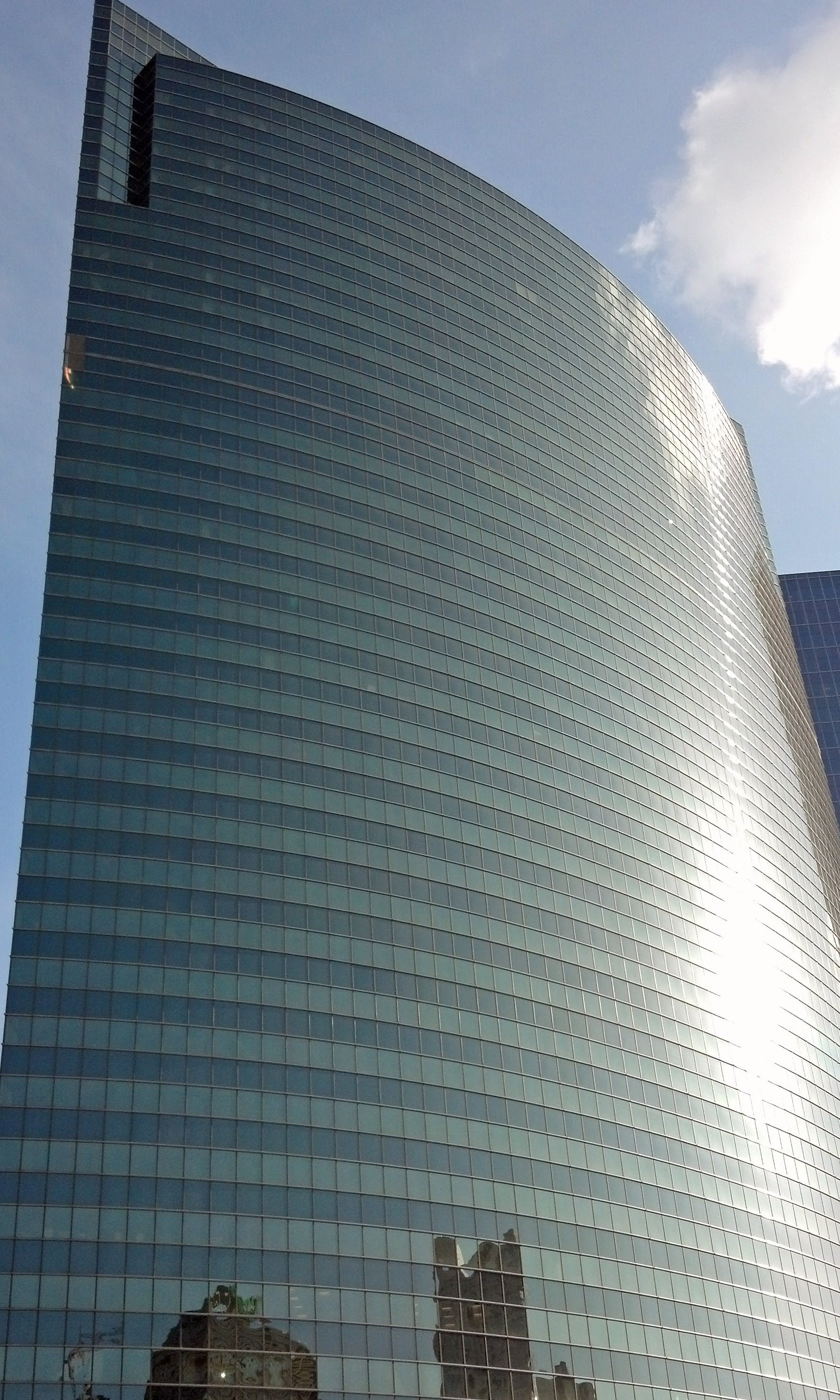
Closer view

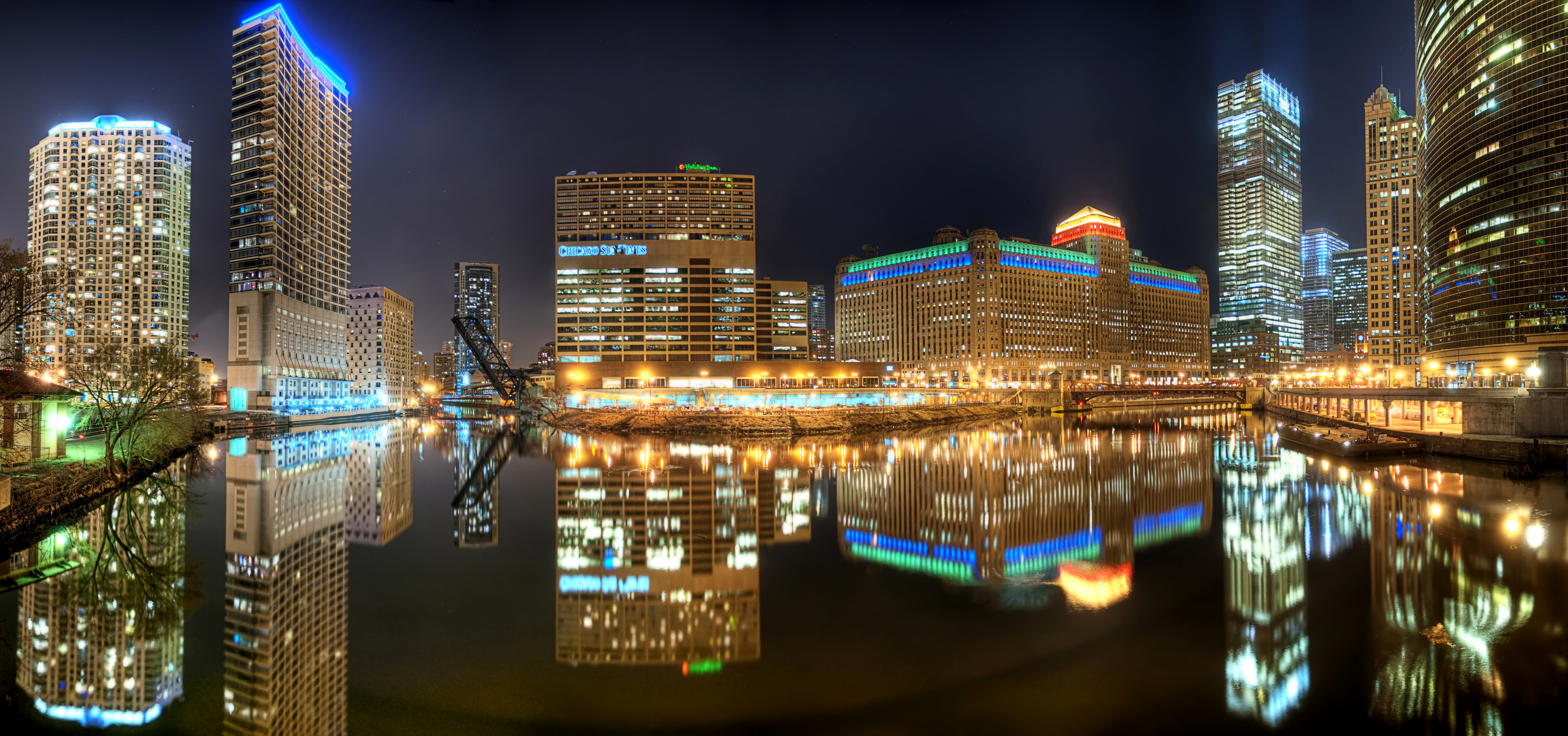
333 Wacker (far right) and its Chicago River surroundings

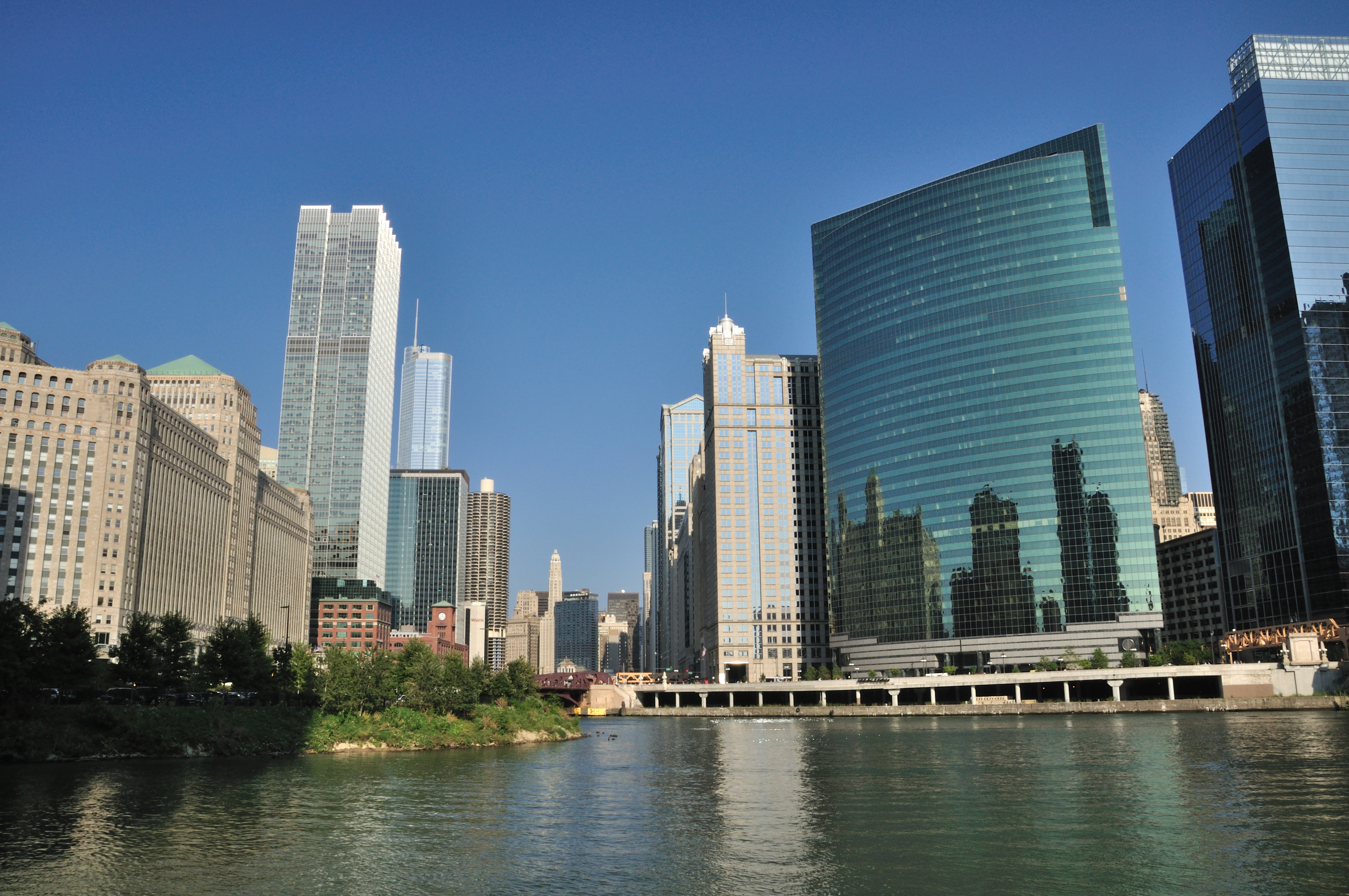
Another view of the building in the context of the river, looking towards the east.
