= Deathstalker and the Warriors from Hell =

- Theatrical release film poster by Boris Vallejo
- Directed by: Alfonso Corona
- Written by: Howard R. Cohen
- Produced by: Alfonso Corona; Antonio De Noriega
- Starring: John Allen Nelson; Carla Herd; Thom Christopher; Terri Treas
- Cinematography: Xavier Cruz
- Music by: Israel Torres; Alejandro Rulfo
- Distributed by: Concorde Pictures
- Release dates: 1988 (Mexico); June 14, 1989 (USA)
- Running time: 86 minutes
- Countries: United States; Mexico
- Language: English

Deathstalker and the Warriors from Hell, also known as Deathstalker III: The Warriors from Hell, is a 1988 sword and sorcery fantasy film. A sequel to Deathstalker II (1987) and it is the third installment in the Deathstalker film series.

== Plot summary ==
Deathstalker and wizard Nicias travel from village to village, living off earnings from Nicias's fortune-telling and magic. At a festival, Princess Carissa asks Nicias if he has a magical stone to match one she possesses. Joined, the stones would uncover the magical and rich city of Arandor, of which Nicias is its last descendant. Nicias directs her to the second stone, possessed by the evil sorcerer Troxartes in a land called Southland. Troxartes wants Carissa's stone to increase his rule.

Searching for Carissa's stone, Troxartes's lieutenant, Makut, and his cavalry raid the festival. Nicias escapes by teleportation. Deathstalker initially escapes with Carissa, but the soldiers catch up with them. Carissa passes her stone to Deathstalker before succumbing to her injuries.

Deathstalker arrives at Southland where he meets Carissa's twin sister, Elizena, who is betrothed to Troxartes. Makut catches up to Deathstalker, who hides in Elizena's tent. Deathstalker's cover is blown when Elizena realizes that he was threatening her with only a twig. Deathstalker escapes. He finds two women, Marinda and her mother, who shelter him and provide potatoes for food. Charmed by Deathstalker, Marinda flees with him just before Makut arrives at the house. Learning that he is up against the formidable Deathstalker, Troxartes uses his power to awaken all the dead foes he has defeated (the titular "Warriors from Hell") to catch the 'legend'.

Suspecting Elizena's guards aided Deathstalker's escape, Makut has his troops kill them. Later on, she accidentally meets Deathstalker in the woods. They finally introduce themselves. In the morning she leaves but is soon attacked by two men who try to rape her. Troxartes is in the area and has his revived men execute them. He takes Elizena back to his castle to marry her, as planned. Deathstalker trails them and infiltrates the castle by night, but is found by Troxartes himself, who asks for the stone. Elizena enters, now wearing red. A guard appears from behind a bookcase to knock out Deathstalker. Troxartes steals Deathstalker's stone. Realizing there is actually a third stone needed to unlock its magic, Troxartes orders his mistress, Camisarde, to torture Deathstalker for its location. Deathstalker escapes and binds Camisarde to the dungeon wall.

Meanwhile, in another part of the castle, Nicias's magic inadvertently teleports him to the castle. Troxartes captures him and intends to put him in his army if his magic cannot find the third stone.

In the woods at night, Deathstalker reunites with Marinda. They encounter a few of Troxartes's undead warriors near a campfire. Amongst the group, Deathstalker recognizes Gragas, whom he killed in a fair fight earlier. Gragas tells them that the undead are forced to do Troxartes's bidding because their souls are kept secure in jars in the castle. Deathstalker makes a deal to get the jars if they will help him against Troxartes. He also tells Marinda to alert the Northern Band to assist them in their planned invasion of Troxartes's castle. Back at the castle, Elizena learns she is being kept as a hostage until the third stone is found. She leads Deathstalker to where Nicias is being kept. They discover that the third stone has been hidden in the castle all along. The Northern Band arrives and Deathstalker releases the souls. Now free, the undead warriors turn on Troxartes and his army. A warrior shoots Makut dead with an arrow while dueling Deathstalker. Troxartes kills Marinda. Deathstalker kills Troxartes.

The three stones are united at last, revealing the secret city of Arandor. Peace is restored to the land. Camisarde, now in purple again, is somehow allowed to live and walk free. Princess Elizena, now in brown, says farewell to Deathstalker, who rides off into the sunset for further adventures.

== Cast ==
- John Allen Nelson as Deathstalker
- Carla Herd as Carissa / Elizena
- Terri Treas as Camisarde
- Thom Christopher as Troxartas
- Aarón Hernán as Nicias
- Roger Cudney as Inaros
- Agustín Salvat as Makut
- Claudia Inchaurregui as Marinda
- Mario Iván Martínez as Preacher
- Carlos Romano as Gragas
- Erika Carlsson as Khorsa
- Alejandro Bracho as Dead Warrior
- Lizetta Romo as Dead Warrior
- Antonio Zubiaga as Soldier
- Manuel Benítez as Soldier

== Production ==
The movie borrows footage from The Raven for some of the exterior shots of Troxartes's castle turrets.

== Reception ==
=== Critical reception ===
Brad Turner, for The Canberra Times, called the film "ridiculous" and "amateurish". Mick Martin and Masha Porter's Video Movie Guide rated the film 2.5/5 and remarked that "[y]ou have so much fun with this one, you forget how hokey it really is."

=== Influence ===
This movie appeared in the seventh season of Mystery Science Theater 3000 as episode #703. In the episode, Mike Nelson, Tom Servo, and Crow T. Robot mock lead actor John Allen Nelson's inability to maintain a consistent accent throughout the film, as well as his character's irritating cockiness that causes them to root against him for most of the movie. They also ridicule Makut's helmet, which has enormous metal bat wings welded on each side. Thom Christopher's physical appearance and poor line delivery in the film also prove to be fodder for several jokes. At one point, Tom Servo comments that he cannot take an "arch nemesis who's five-eight and bald" seriously. The wizard Nicias prompts numerous jokes as well, primarily The Lord of the Rings comments that compare his appearance to Gandalf, Saruman, and Radagast the Brown. The film's lame attempt at a battle scene prompted Mike Nelson to say on two occasions, "This movie is like playing Doom when there's no monsters or opponents", and "This is one of the most ambitiously bad movies we have ever done".

The episode's stinger (following the end credits) is Marinda's mother angrily declaring "Potatoes are what we eat!"

The MST3K version of Deathstalker and the Warriors from Hell was included as part of the Mystery Science Theater 3000, Volume XXXV DVD collection, released by Shout! Factory on March 29, 2016. The other episodes in the four-disc set include Teenage Caveman (episode #315), Being from Another Planet (episode #405), and 12 to the Moon (episode #524).

== Soundtrack ==
The movie's theme tune is a recycling of James Horner's theme for Roger Corman's Battle Beyond the Stars, which has been re-used by Corman himself for several of his films, including Space Raiders and Sorceress. The film also includes an excerpt of Brian Eno's "Prophecy Theme" from the soundtrack of the 1984 David Lynch version of Dune.
