= Beacon Capital Partners =

American real estate investment firm based in Boston, Massachusetts

Beacon Capital Partners, LLC
- Type: Private
- Industry: Real estate
- Predecessor: Beacon Properties, Inc. (1994 - 1997); The Beacon Companies (1946 - 1994)
- Founded: 1998; 28 years ago
- Founder: Alan M. Leventhal
- Headquarters: Boston, Massachusetts
- Area served: United States
- Key people: Fred A. Seigel (President & CEO)
- Products: Office buildings; Laboratories
- Number of employees: 120 (2022)
- Website: beaconcapital.com

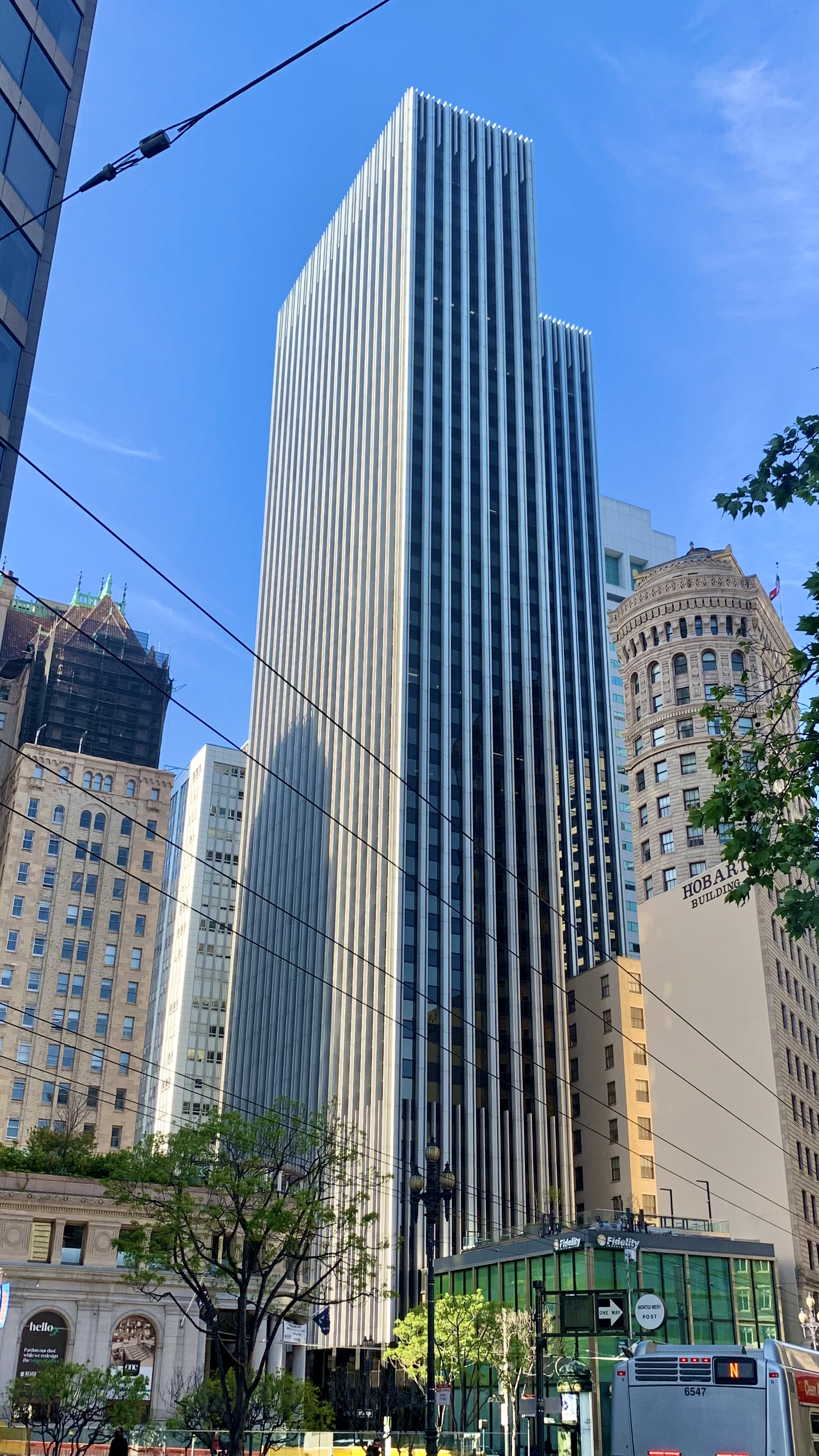
44 Montgomery in San Francisco, a building owned by the company

Beacon Capital Partners is an American real estate investment firm based in Boston, Massachusetts. It was founded in 1998, after Beacon Properties, Inc., Beacon's predecessor, was acquired by EQ Office in a $4 billion transaction. The company focuses on office and life science properties in major markets across the United States. Its European presence formerly included buildings in London, Paris, and Luxembourg.

== Select Properties ==
Select list of properties developed or owned by Beacon Capital Partners:

=== Current ===
- 2 Harbor (Boston, MA)
- 44 Montgomery (San Francisco, CA)
- 53 State Street (Boston, MA)
- 333 West Wacker (Chicago, IL)
- 600 Congress (Austin, TX)
- Bank of America Tower (Houston, TX)
- Dynamic One - TMC Helix Park (Houston, TX)
- Lake Merritt Plaza (Oakland, CA)
- Spring House Innovation Park (Lower Gwynedd Township, PA)
- Southline Boston (Boston, MA), former headquarters of The Boston Globe
- Terrell Place (Washington, D.C.)

=== Former ===
- 10 Universal City Plaza (Universal City, CA), sold 2006
- 85 Broad Street (New York, NY)
- 190 South LaSalle (Chicago, IL)
- 221 Main Street (San Francisco, CA)
- 330 Hudson (New York, NY)
- 535 Mission Street (San Francisco, CA), sold 2012
- 575 Fifth Avenue (New York)
- 901 Fifth Avenue (New York, NY), sold 2007
- AMA Plaza (Chicago, IL)
- Berkeley Building (Boston, MA), sold 2006
- Citigroup Center (Los Angeles, CA), sold 2006
- City Center East (Bellevue, WA), sold 2010
- CityPoint (London, England), sold 2016
- Columbia Center (Seattle, WA), sold 2015
- John Hancock Tower (Boston, MA), sold 2007
- One Beacon Street (Boston, MA), sold 2014
- One Sansome Street (San Francisco, CA), sold 2010
- Presidential Tower (Arlington, VA), sold 2019
- Tour First (Paris, France)
- Tysons Metro Center (Tysons, VA), sold 2017
- Wells Fargo Center (Denver, CO)
- Wells Fargo Center (Seattle, WA), sold 2013

== See also ==
- Norman B. Leventhal
