= Norman B. Leventhal Map Center =

Division of the Boston Public Library

Coordinates: 42°20′57.55″N 71°4′41.78″W

Norman B. Leventhal Map & Education Center
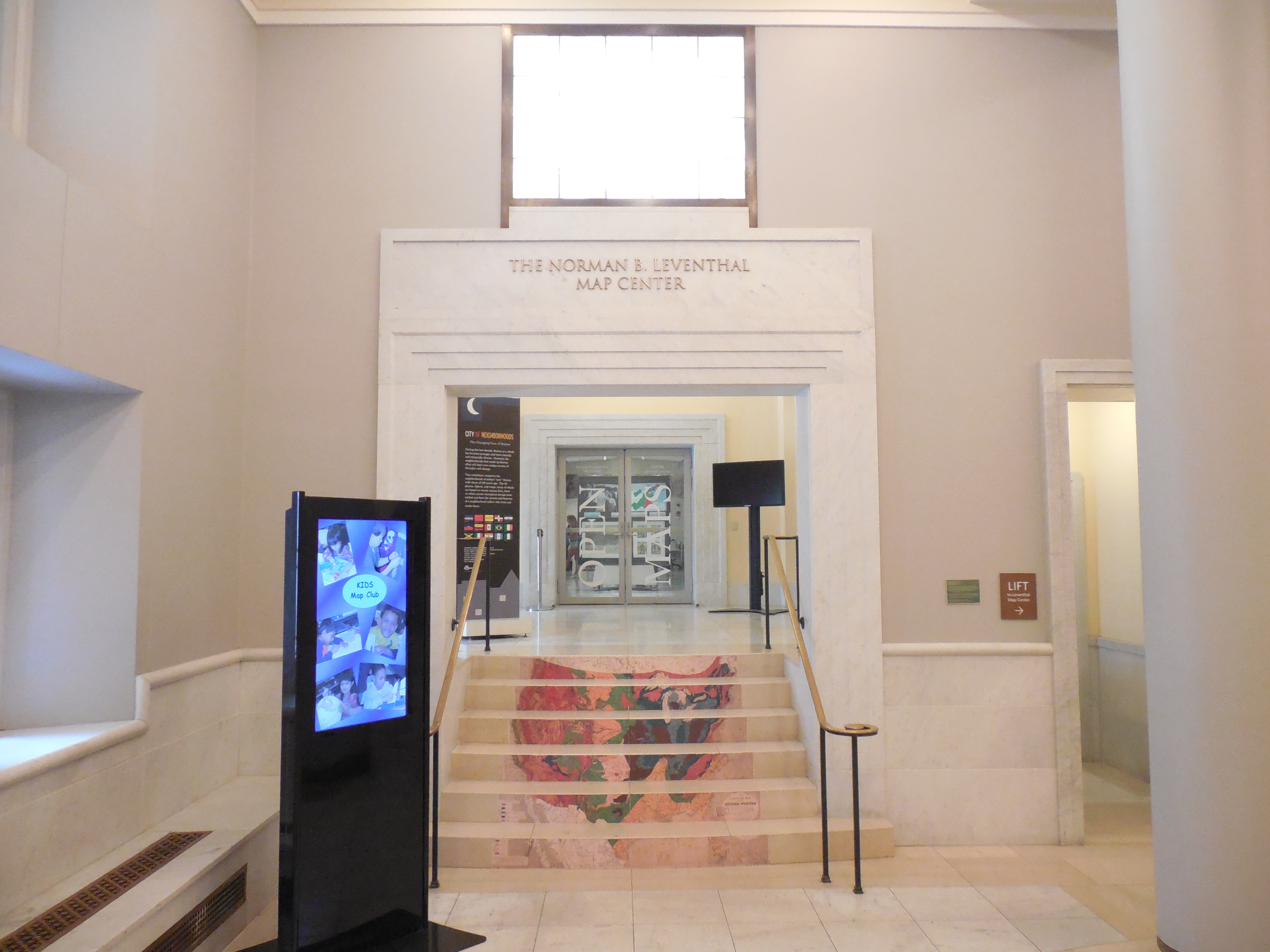
- Entrance
- Housed at: Boston Public Library
- Curators: Garrett Dash Nelson
- Website: https://leventhalmap.org

Location in Boston

The Norman B. Leventhal Map & Education Center at the Boston Public Library is a special collections center in Boston, Massachusetts with research, educational, and exhibition programs relating to historical geography. It is the steward of the Boston Public Library’s map collection, consisting of approximately a quarter million geographic objects, including maps, atlases, globes, ephemera, and geographic data. It is located in the McKim Building of the Central Library in Copley Square.

The center was founded in 2004 with a $10 million endowment as a public-private partnership between the Boston Public Library (BPL) and map collector and philanthropist Norman B. Leventhal.

== About the collection ==
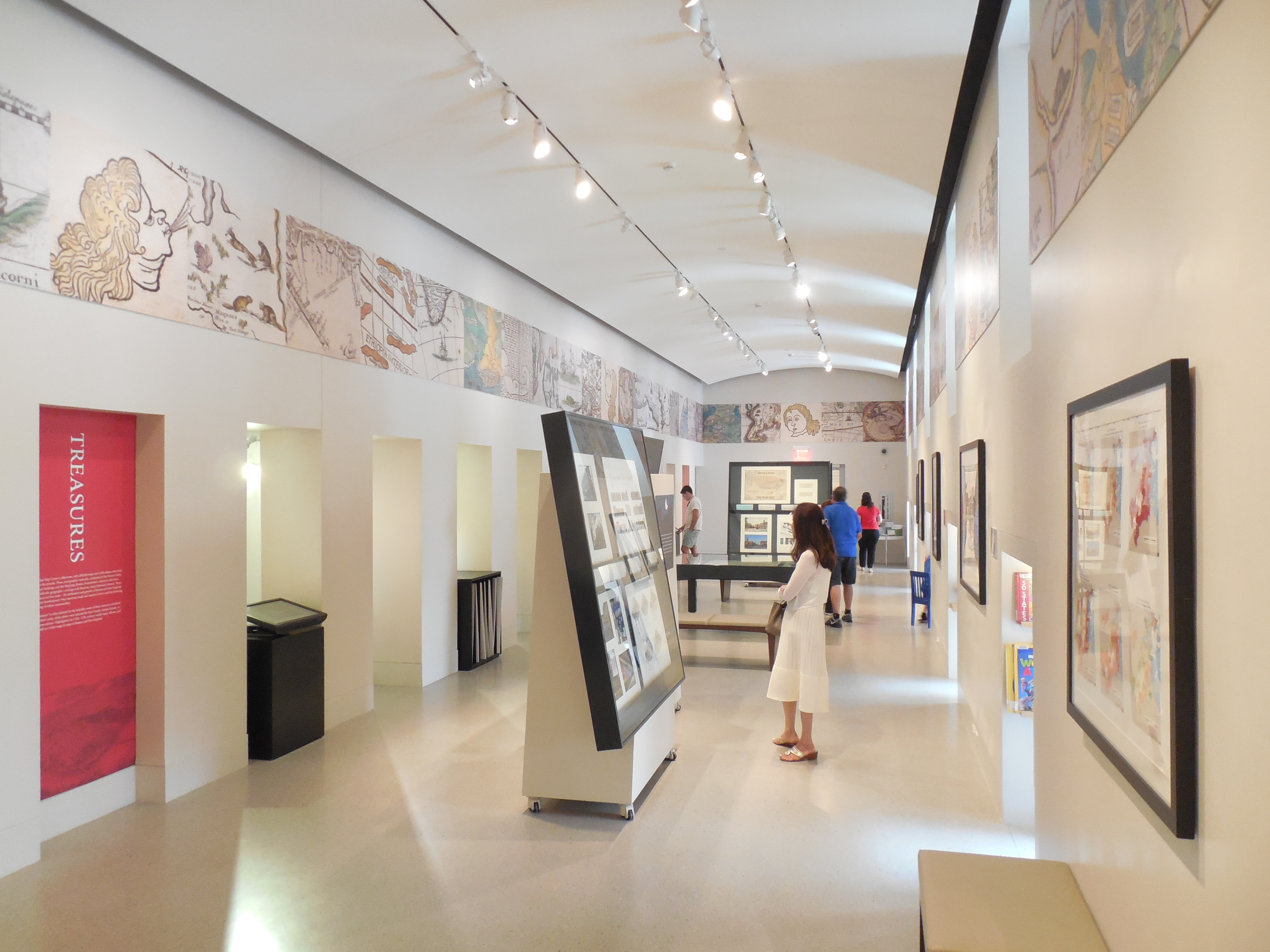
Gallery

The center manages the geographic collections of the Boston Public Library as well as material collected by Norman B. Leventhal during his lifetime, known as the Mapping Boston Collection. Its holdings stretch chronologically from the 15th century to the present, and geographically cover the world, with a focus on Boston and New England. The center also holds depository library maps and atlases produced by federal, state, and local agencies, as well as data sets used in geographic information systems.

Four named collections of distinction include:

- American Revolutionary War-Era Maps
- Boston and New England Maps
- Maritime Charts and Atlases
- Urban Maps

Portions of the Mapping Boston Collection are on exhibit and available for viewing at the Boston Harbor Hotel and the Langham Hotel.

== Digital collections ==
The center offers digital collections consisting of more than 10,000 objects, primarily with rights status in the public domain. In 2013, the center received a $40,000 grant from the National Endowment for the Humanities to promote digital access to 3,000 cartographic images held by multiple institutions that document the period of the American Revolutionary War (1750-1800).

== Selected publications ==
- America Transformed: Mapping the 19th Century (2019) OCLC: 1126349476
- We Are One: Mapping America's Road from Revolution to Independence (2015) OCLC: 918876662
- Torn in Two: 150th Anniversary of the Civil War OCLC: 726743324

== Gallery ==
A small sample of maps in the collection.

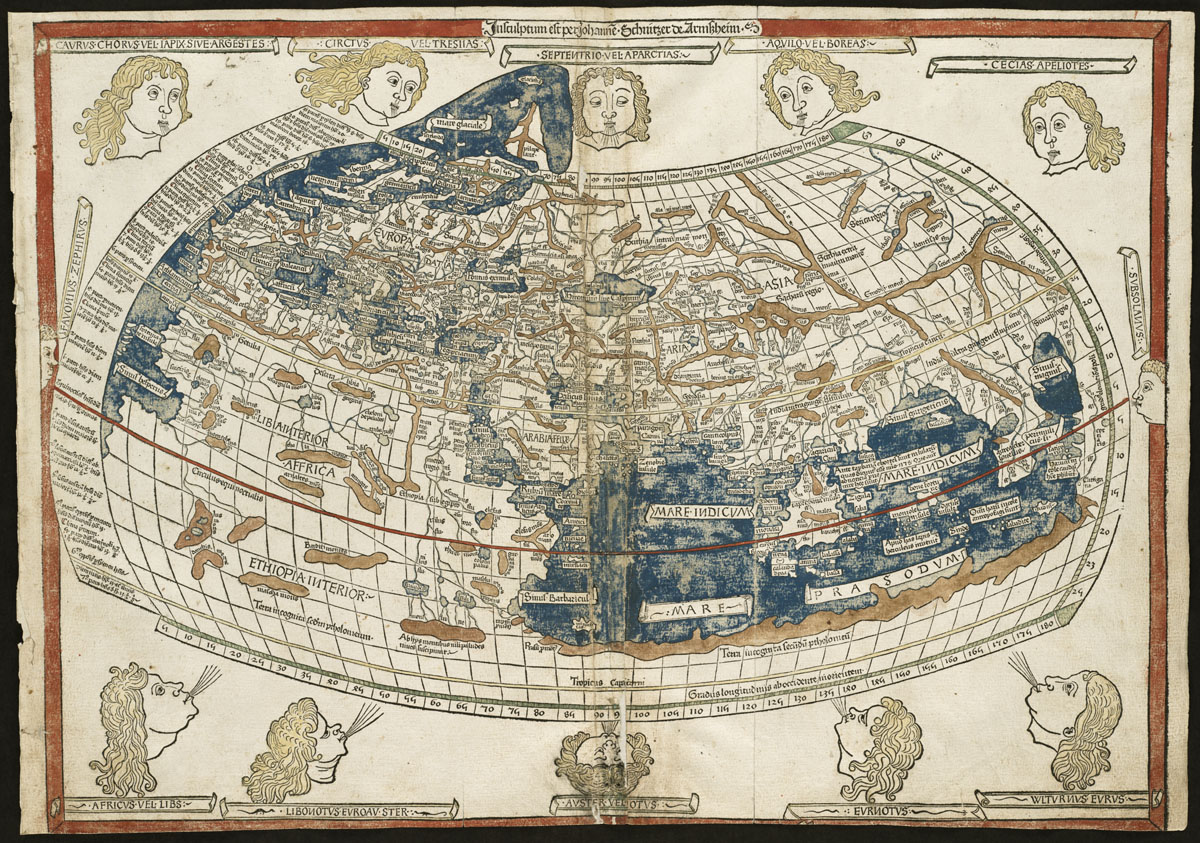
World Map by Claudius Ptolemy, 1482

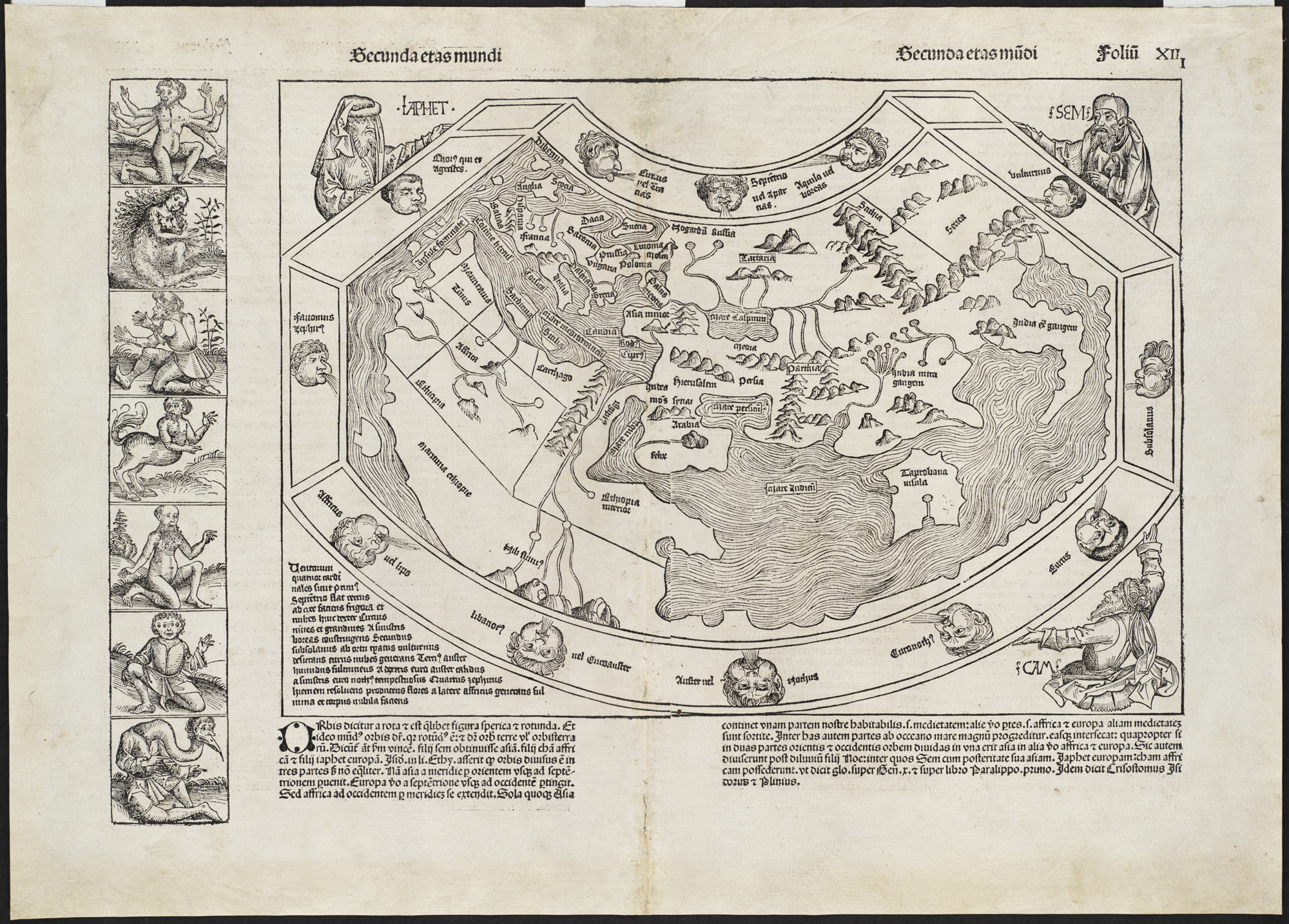
World Map by Hartmann Schedel, 1493

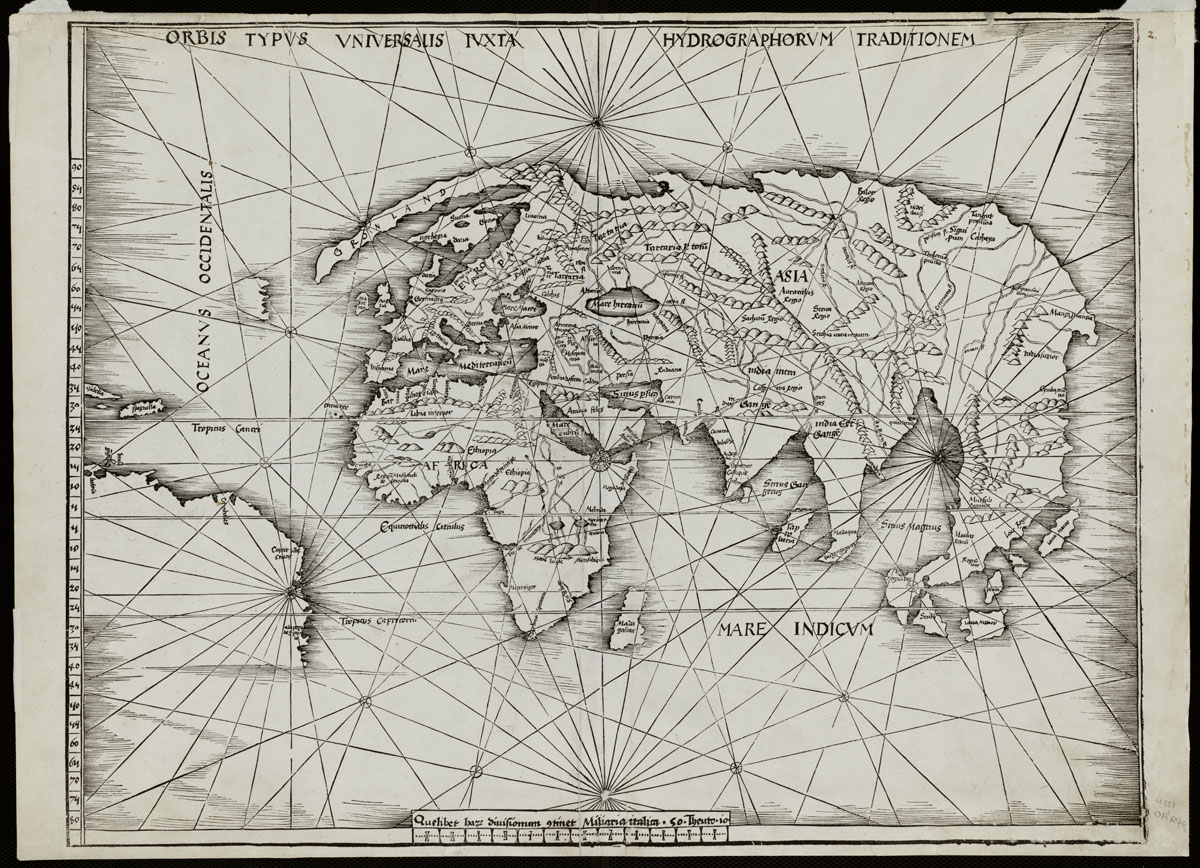
World Map by Martin Waldseemèuller, 1513

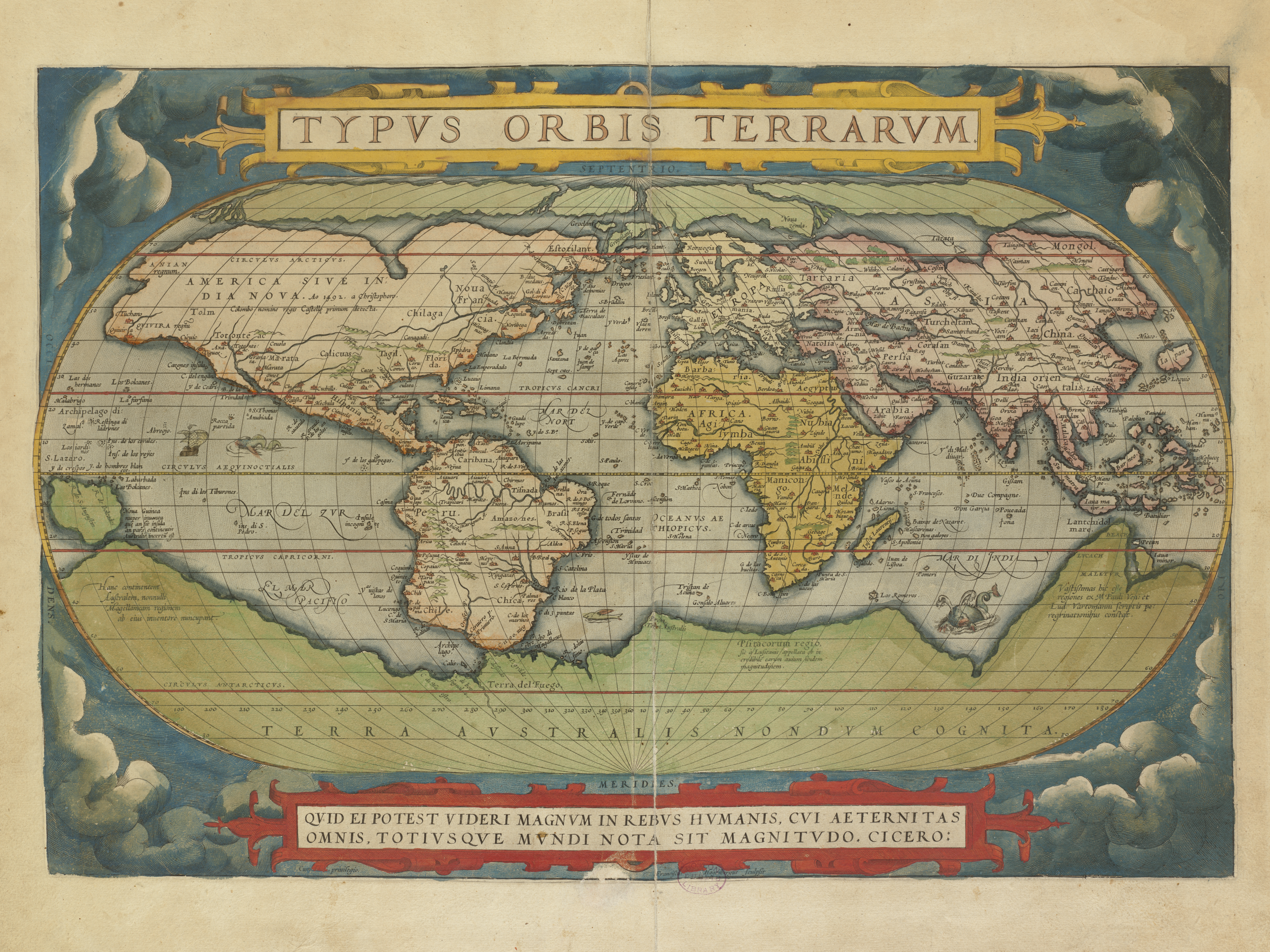
World Map by Abraham Ortelius, 1570

Paris by Louis Bretez, 1739
