= Norman B. Leventhal =

- Born: August 30, 1917
- Died: April 5, 2015 (aged 97)
- Education: B.S. Massachusetts Institute of Technology
- Occupation: Real Estate Developer
- Known for: Chairman of The Beacon Companies
- Spouse: Muriel Guren
- Children: Alan Leventhal; Mark Leventhal; Paula Leventhal Sidman
- Family: Robert Leventhal (brother); Dorothy Levinson (sister); Edward Leventhal (brother)

Norman B. Leventhal (August 30, 1917 – April 5, 2015) was an American businessman, the chairman of The Beacon Companies, a developer and manager of office buildings, housing, and hotels. Leventhal was best known for his work in civic improvements to the city of Boston, and consequently had a park named after him of which he oversaw the creation.

== Biography ==
Born and raised to an immigrant Jewish family in Boston, Leventhal was a 1933 graduate of Boston Latin School and a 1938 graduate of MIT with a B.S. in engineering. During World War II, he and his brother Robert worked as naval architects at the Charlestown Navy Yard. In 1946, he and his brother co-founded Beacon Construction Company; they began with the remodeling of stores but soon expanded into larger projects including 40 toll booths on the New York State Thruway, the construction of post offices nationwide and then into the construction of public and military housing including at Fort Devens. In 1972, his brother Robert died at the age of 58 and his sons, Alan and Mark, and son-in-law Bill Sidman (who died in 2005) joined the firm renamed The Beacon Companies.

At Beacon, Leventhal helped direct several major civic improvement projects in Boston, including Rowes Wharf, Center Plaza, One Post Office Square, and 5,100 units of affordable housing. Beacon's conversion of Post Office Square from a 2 1/2-story parking garage to a lush park, with parking underground, in 1992 is considered emblematic of Leventhal's vision: to enliven and make hospitable Boston's public spaces. "We must constantly work to find ways to make the riches of Boston available to all her citizens, not just the most fortunate among us," he was quoted in a 1997 Boston Globe article. Post Office Square Park was dedicated and named Norman B. Leventhal Park the same year. As chairman of the Trust for City Hall Plaza, Leventhal led the effort to revitalize that center.

== Philanthropy ==
He and his wife funded the Muriel and Norman B. Leventhal Center for Jewish Life at MIT and the Leventhal-Sidman Jewish Community Center in Newton, Massachusetts. Leventhal published Mapping Boston (MIT Press, 1999), a book about the social and topographical development of Boston, from its founding to the present day. He was inducted to the Greater Boston Chamber of Commerce's Academy of Distinguished Citizens in 1999 and was honored by several other business and philanthropic organizations. He held honorary degrees from Hebrew College and Brandeis University.

In 2004 Leventhal, a collector of historic maps, partnered with the Boston Public Library creating The Norman B. Leventhal Map Center at the Boston Public Library (BPL). The partnership enables public access to the 250,000 maps and atlases in the Boston Public Library’s collection. Leventhal envisioned that the BPLs cartographic resources would lead to the foundation of educational programs for students.

== Personal life ==
In 1941, he married Muriel Guren; they had three children: Alan M. Leventhal, Mark Leventhal, and Paula Leventhal Sidman. Alan is chairman and chief executive officer of Beacon Capital Partners.

He died at the age of 97 in 2015.
