= Docusign Tower =

Skyscraper in Seattle

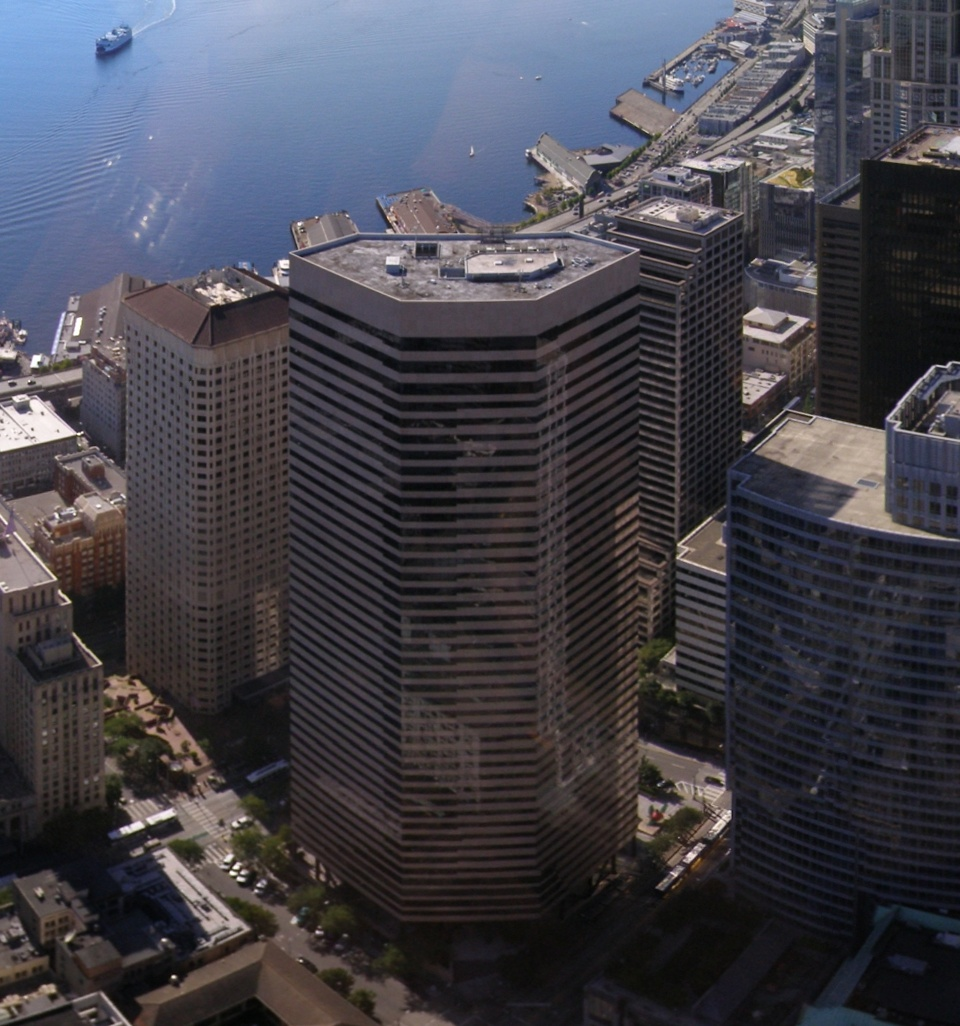
- Exterior of the Docusign Tower from the 73rd floor of the Columbia Center in 2012

- Location within Downtown Seattle
- Former names: First Interstate Tower, Wells Fargo Center

General information
- Type: Commercial offices
- Location: 999 Third Avenue; Seattle, Washington, U.S.
- Coordinates: 47.605°N 122.3341°W
- Current tenants: Docusign
- Completed: 1983
- Owner: EQ Office
- Operator: EQ Office

Height
- Roof: 174.96 m (574.0 ft)

Technical details
- Floor count: 47
- Floor area: 87,753 m^{2} (944,570 sq ft)
- Lifts/elevators: 24

Design and construction
- Architect: McKinley Architects
- Main contractor: Howard S. Wright Construction

Website
- 999thirdave.com

Docusign Tower, previously the Wells Fargo Center, is a skyscraper in Seattle, in the U.S. state of Washington. Originally named First Interstate Center when completed in 1983, the 47-story, 574-foot (175 m) tower is now the ninth-tallest building in the city, and has 24 elevators and 941,000 square feet (87,400 m^{2}) of rentable space. The design work was done by The McKinley Architects, and it is owned by Chicago-based EQ Office.

In 2013, the building was purchased by Canada's Ivanhoé Cambridge from Beacon Capital Partners of Boston. The building was renamed after First Interstate Bancorp was taken over by Wells Fargo in 1996. In 2019, the building was purchased by EQ Office. Docusign took over naming rights in 2020 after expanding their lease within the building, which began in 2015. In 2026, DocuSign signed an office lease at the nearby JPMorganChase Center and listed its space in its namesake tower for lease, with an availability date of July 2027.

The exterior façade is composed of a six-sided, steel-framed tower that features a combination of tinted continuous double-glazed glass and polished spring rose granite panels. As is common with buildings in downtown Seattle, Docusign Tower rests on a slope. The eastern entrance facing Third Avenue is slightly more than two stories higher than the Western side facing Second Avenue. On the west side, the building has a public hill climb on two flights of outdoor escalators that were encased in clear tubes until 2006, when they were updated with a simpler, more modern glass roof. The building has three levels of outdoor plazas. Several retail spaces face the west plaza.

The site was previously occupied by the 12-story Olympic National Life building, which was demolished by implosion on the morning of Sunday, February 28, 1982. It was the first demolition by implosion in downtown Seattle. One of the city's first steel skyscrapers, it was built in 1906 and was also known as the American Savings Bank and the Empire Building.

== See also ==
- List of tallest buildings in Seattle
