= AMLI Arc =

Skyscraper and mixed-use building complex in Seattle, Washington

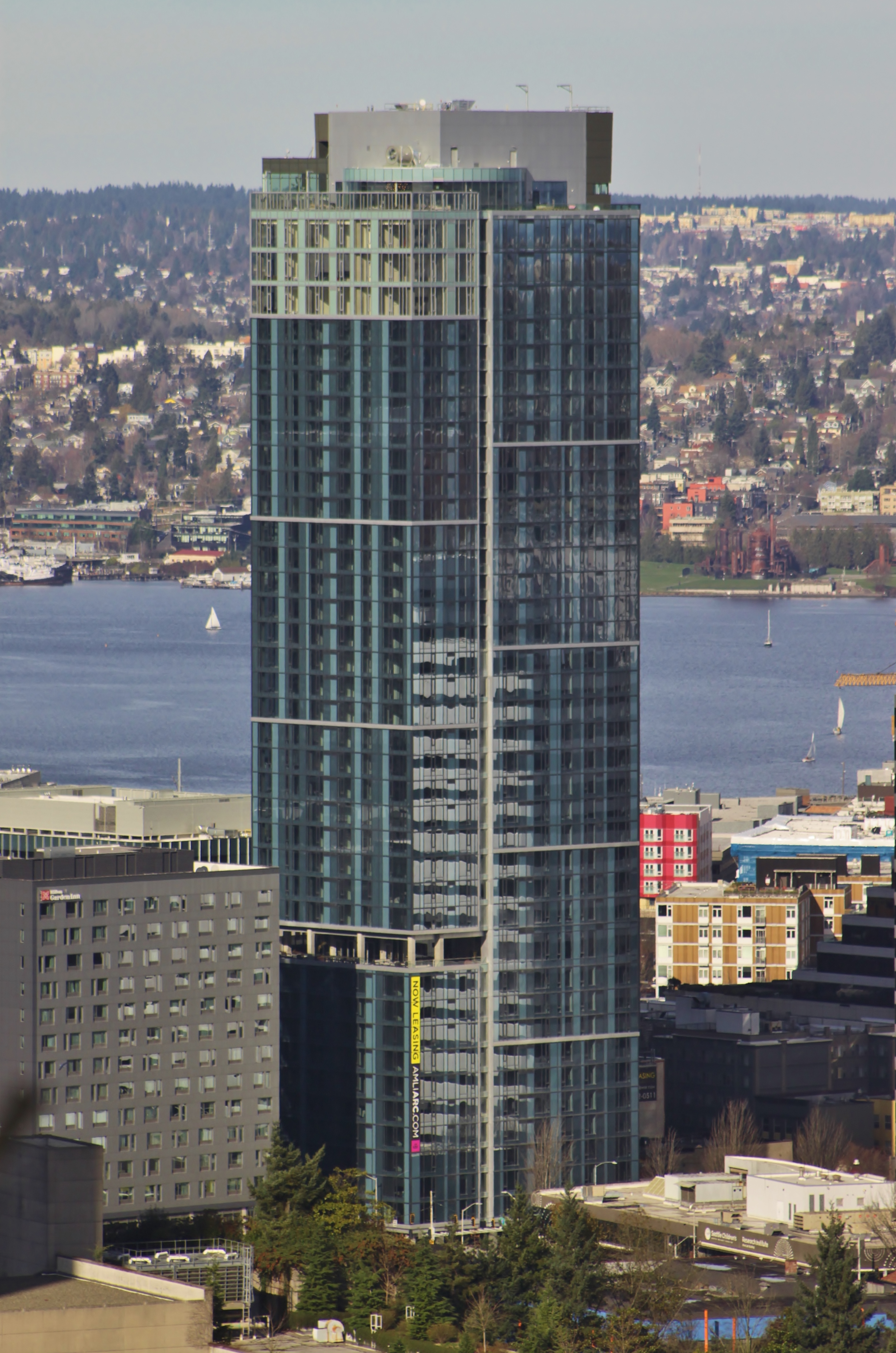
- AMLI Arc pictured from the Municipal Tower in 2018

- Location within downtown Seattle
- Alternative names: Tilt 49

General information
- Status: Completed
- Type: Residential and commercial
- Location: 1812 Boren Avenue; Seattle, Washington, U.S.
- Coordinates: 47°36′59.55″N 122°19′53.28″W
- Construction started: June 2015
- Topped-out: April 2017
- Completed: 2017
- Cost: $143 million
- Owner: AMLI Residential

Height
- Height: South Tower: 440 feet (130 m)

Technical details
- Material: Post-tensioned concrete
- Floor count: AMLI Arc: 41; Tilt 49: 11 (north building)
- Floor area: Tilt 49: 307,296 square feet (28,548.7 m^{2})

Design and construction
- Architecture firm: ZGF Architects LLP
- Developer: Touchstone Corporation, AMLI Residential, Mortenson Development
- Structural engineer: Magnusson Klemencic Associates
- Main contractor: Mortenson Construction

Other information
- Number of units: South Tower: 410 apartments
- Parking: 547 parking stalls

Website
- tilt49seattle.net

AMLI Arc, also known as Tilt 49, is a mixed-use building complex in Seattle, Washington, United States. It consists of two buildings, both facing Boren Avenue between Stewart and Howell streets: a 41-story, 440-foot-tall (130 m) residential skyscraper with 368 apartments to the south; and an 11-story, 307,296-square-foot (28,548.7 m^{2}) office building with retail space to the north. Tilt 49 shares this block with the Kinects residential tower as well as the cancelled Daola Tower.

Developers Touchstone proposed the building in 2014 and bought the site, then a Goodyear Tires store and surface parking lot, for $16.6 million. Construction began in June 2015. In 2017, Amazon.com announced that it had signed a lease for the entire 11-story office portion of Tilt 49.

The residential tower topped out in April 2017, and was completed in November.

The name of the office building, Tilt 49, refers to the 49-degree angle at which the Denny Triangle neighborhood is aligned relative to true north, facing instead towards waterfront property on Elliott Bay owned by Arthur A. Denny (for whom the neighborhood is named).
