= Ezra Hamilton =

American pioneer

Ezra M. Hamilton
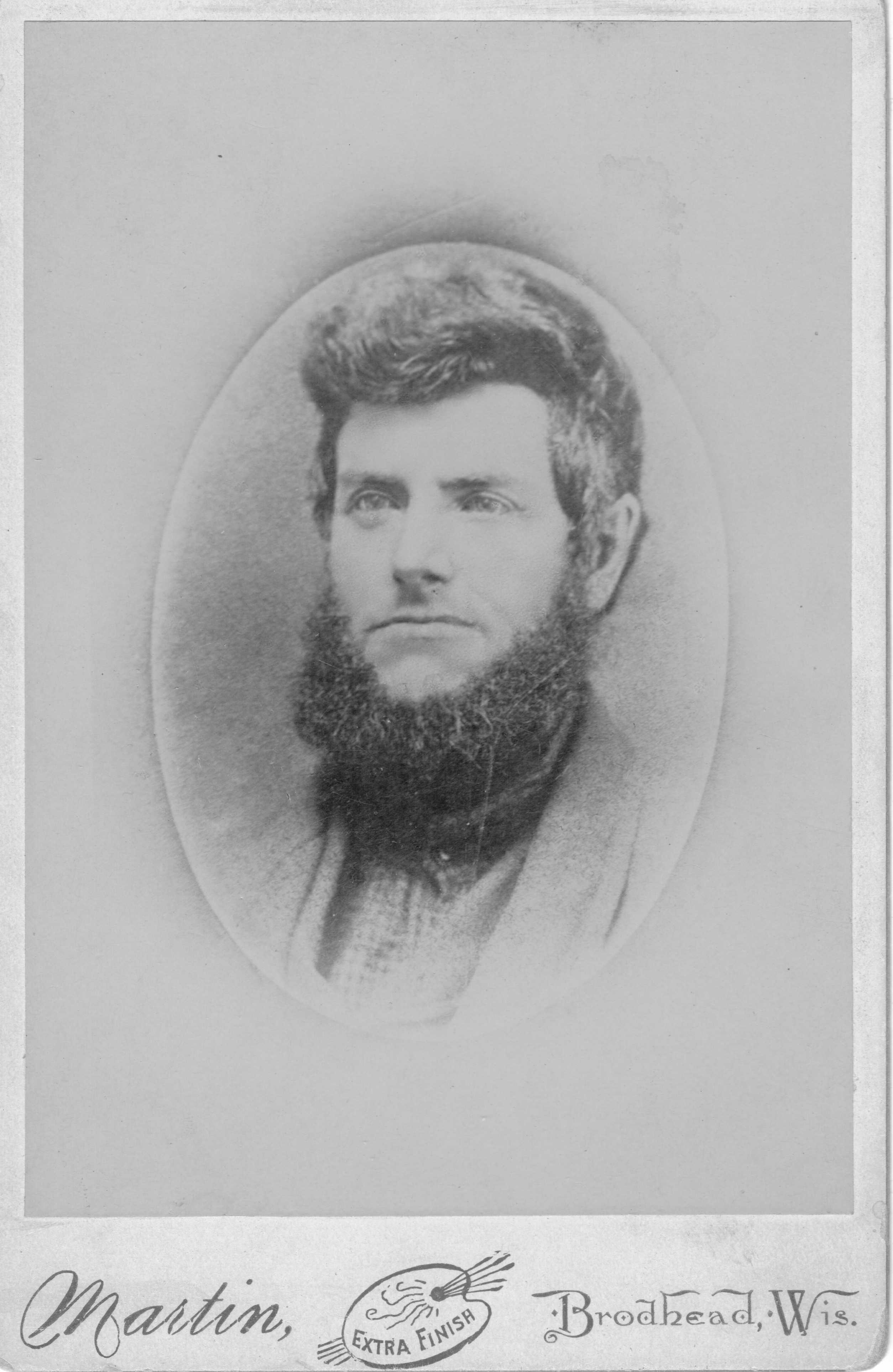
- Born: February 22, 1833; Brown County, Illinois, U.S.
- Died: July 4, 1914 (aged 81); Willow Springs, California
- Occupations: Prospector, developer, inventor

Ezra M. Hamilton (1833–1914) was a pioneer known for his role in the development of Antelope Valley, California. In 1896 he discovered gold in Rosamond, California and began a successful mining operation that spurred growth in the area. He founded and developed the nearby town of Willow Springs. He was also an inventor, farmer, mason and businessman, served on the Los Angeles Common Council, volunteered in the Rogue River Wars and served two years in the Union Army.

== Personal ==
Hamilton was born in 1833 in Brown County, Illinois, spent his boyhood there, and "worked a short time on a riverboat before heading west to seek his fortune" in 1853.

On his journey West he fell in love with a young woman, but they were prevented from marrying by Ezra's stubborn desire to first make his fortune prospecting in California. [In the book he wrote about his adventures, he] never reveals her identity, but his life is shaped by their relationship. . . . after seven years his lady friend married another.

He returned to Minnesota after the American Civil War and there he found another woman, Sarah Landson, and they were married in 1861; they lived in the Minneapolis area. Sarah and their son died in 1867.

Hamilton married again, to Harriet Moffett, and they had four sons, Fred, Truman, Eugene and Lester. While residing in Los Angeles, they lived at 310 Avenue 23 in today's Lincoln Heights district, East Los Angeles, in a house he built on first arriving.

He was a commander of the Kenesaw post of the Grand Army of the Republic.

Hamilton died in Willow Springs, California, on July 4, 1914, the tenth anniversary of his marriage to Harriet, and he was buried in Evergreen Cemetery, Los Angeles. He left his widow and three sons, Fred of Willow Springs, Lester of Avenue 23 and Trumon of Rosamond.

== Vocation ==
=== Military ===
Hamilton served for two years in the First Minnesota Regiment of the Union Army during the Civil War.

=== Inventions ===
After the war, Hamilton worked in carpentry and farming, which led to his first patent for a peat-pressing machine in 1867.

==== Patents ====
- Patent 71,163 for Peat Machine, 1867
- Patent 196,295 for Molds for Making Pipes from Mortar, 1877
- Patent 220,757 for Apparatus for Making and Laying Continuous Concrete-Pipe, 1879
- Patent 216,673 for Pipes for Irrigation, 1879
- Patent 1,025,395 for Wave-Motor, 1912
- Patent 1,026,803 for Automobile-Tire, 1912

=== Brick making ===
In Los Angeles Hamilton began manufacturing pottery, clay pipe, tile and bricks. For the clay needed to make his products, he purchased a hill near Rosamond, California, which is where he later made a gold strike.

About 1884 Hamilton's brick yard switched from using wood to petroleum oil for the firing of the bricks, thereby reducing his cost from $3 to $1 per thousand.

=== Mining ===
In October 1897 Hamilton was just a "poor old soldier receiving a pension of six dollars a month" when he filed a 300-by-500-yard mineral claim in the Antelope Valley, California, ninety-six miles north of Los Angeles, five miles west of Rosamond and three miles east of Willow Springs. In March 1899 he was transformed into a wealthy man by his discovery of a rich vein of gold ore: He took $30,000 worth of ore from it, and although the Lida Mine, as he called it, was "well worth a million dollars" he sold it for $100,000 in December 1900. He retained an adjacent mine, which he named Fay.

He told a newspaper reporter: "Three more days of prospecting would have finished me. I was worn out physically, financially and mentally, when I made the big find, but then, the gold cure is a good one, and now I feel young again."

Hamilton was sued by Helen Frick, who claimed she had been a partner in the claim but that he had misled her as to the mine's worth and bought her share for only $500. She asked that the sale be set aside as fraudulent and that Hamilton account to her for all the profits. It was said that Helen Frick's name was used instead of that of her husband, who had bought out Hamilton's original partner, "a man named Gray."

Hamilton nevertheless retained ownership of mining property in the area until:

After an ill-fated stock promotion attempt in 1907 by the Tiger Head Mining Company, the Antelope Mining Company acquired most of the claims in 1908, selling them to the Tropico Mining and Milling Company in 1909. The Tropico Company was so named because several stockholders were from Tropico, California (located near Forest Lawn Memorial Park). V. V. Cochran was president of this company, which consolidated and patented many of the mines.

== Politics ==
=== Partisan affiliation ===
Hamilton was elected president of the Los Angeles County Greenback Party at a convention in September 1882. Principles of the county platform included "the abolishment of the present system of National Banks," establishment of a legal tender that should be issued "directly to the people without the intervention of any system of banking corporations," government ownership of "all main lines of railroad and telegraph," opposition to "Chinese coolie immigration," in favor of women's suffrage and of direct election of the President and other officers.

By October 1884 Hamilton was active in the People's Party, being the chairman of a rally at which the party candidates spoke. Newspaper editor and author Horace Bell was the featured speaker. In November 1892 he was the unsuccessful People's Party candidate for county supervisor in the 5th District. James Hanley was the winner.

=== Common Council ===
He was elected as an independent (no party affiliation) to represent the 1st Ward on the Los Angeles Common Council for a one-year term beginning December 1878 and was elected again for two one-year terms beginning in 1883 and 1884. "He claims the distinction of fathering the movement to increase the local saloon license from $5 to $50 a month, and also of compelling the Council to rescind an action taken whereby newspaper reporters were excluded from weekly meetings."

== Manuscript ==
Hamilton compiled an 842-page autobiographical manuscript during the last years of his life. It was passed down to his son Fred, whose widow donated it to the California State Library in 1920. It begins with several second-hand accounts of major events that occurred around the time of Hamilton's birth. He describes the famous Leonid meteor storm of 1833 and the winter of 1830–1831, known as the Winter of the Deep Snow.

== Legacy ==
Hamilton used the initial proceeds from his gold mine to buy a 160-acre parcel of land three miles to the west. The area was an oasis in Antelope Valley and had been used by Indians and travelers passing through the Mojave Desert. He spent several years developing Willow Springs into a resort town, with a swimming pool and dance hall. Many of the stone buildings he constructed are still standing.

== References and notes ==
Access to the Los Angeles Times links may require the use of a library card.

=== Bibliography ===
- Ward, William H. (1886). Records of the Members of the Grand Army of the Republic with a Complete Account of the Twentieth Encampment. San Francisco: H. S. Crocker & Co.
