= M.A. Mortenson Company =

American construction firm

Coordinates: 44.985509°N 93.329421°W

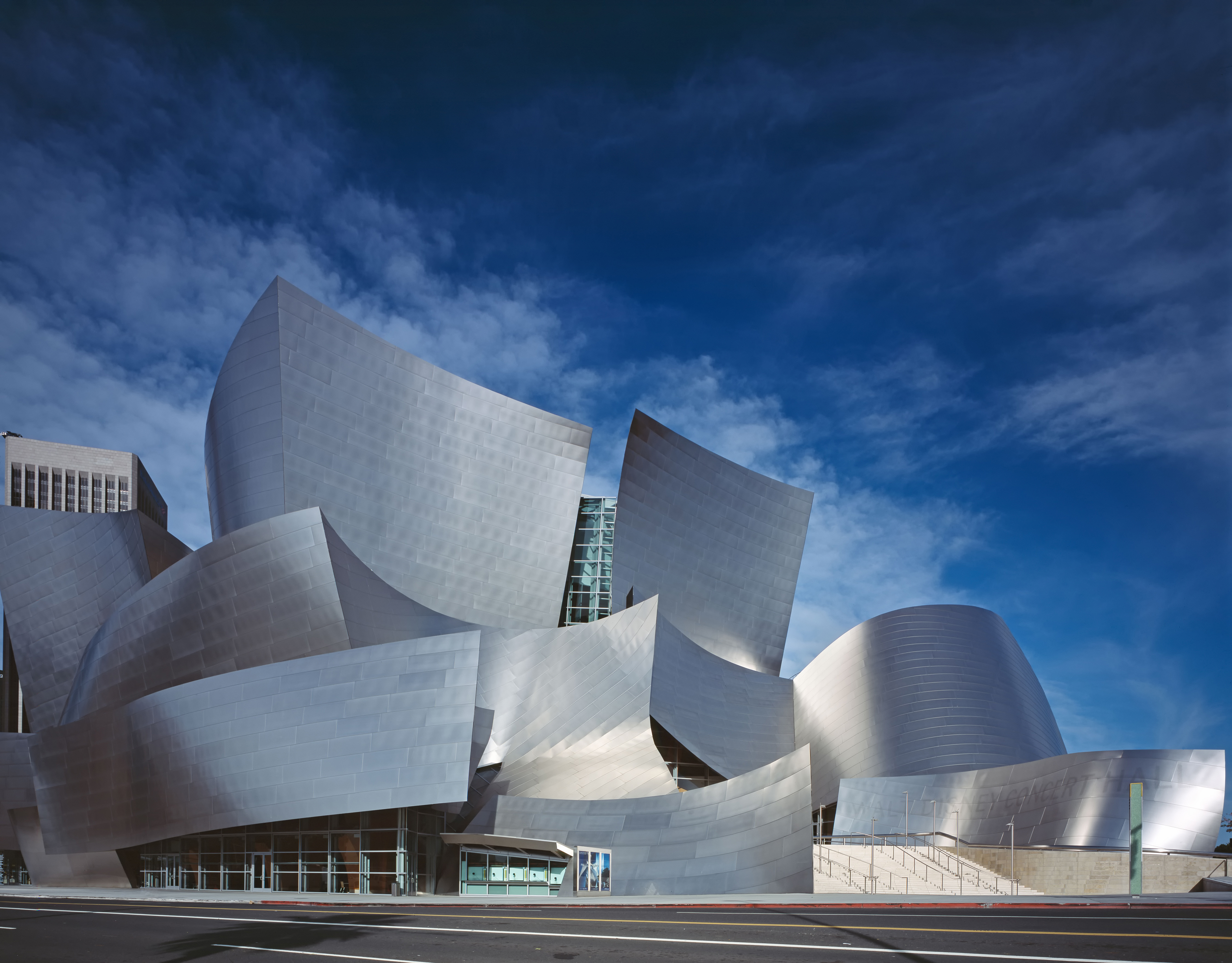
Exterior of the Walt Disney Concert Hall

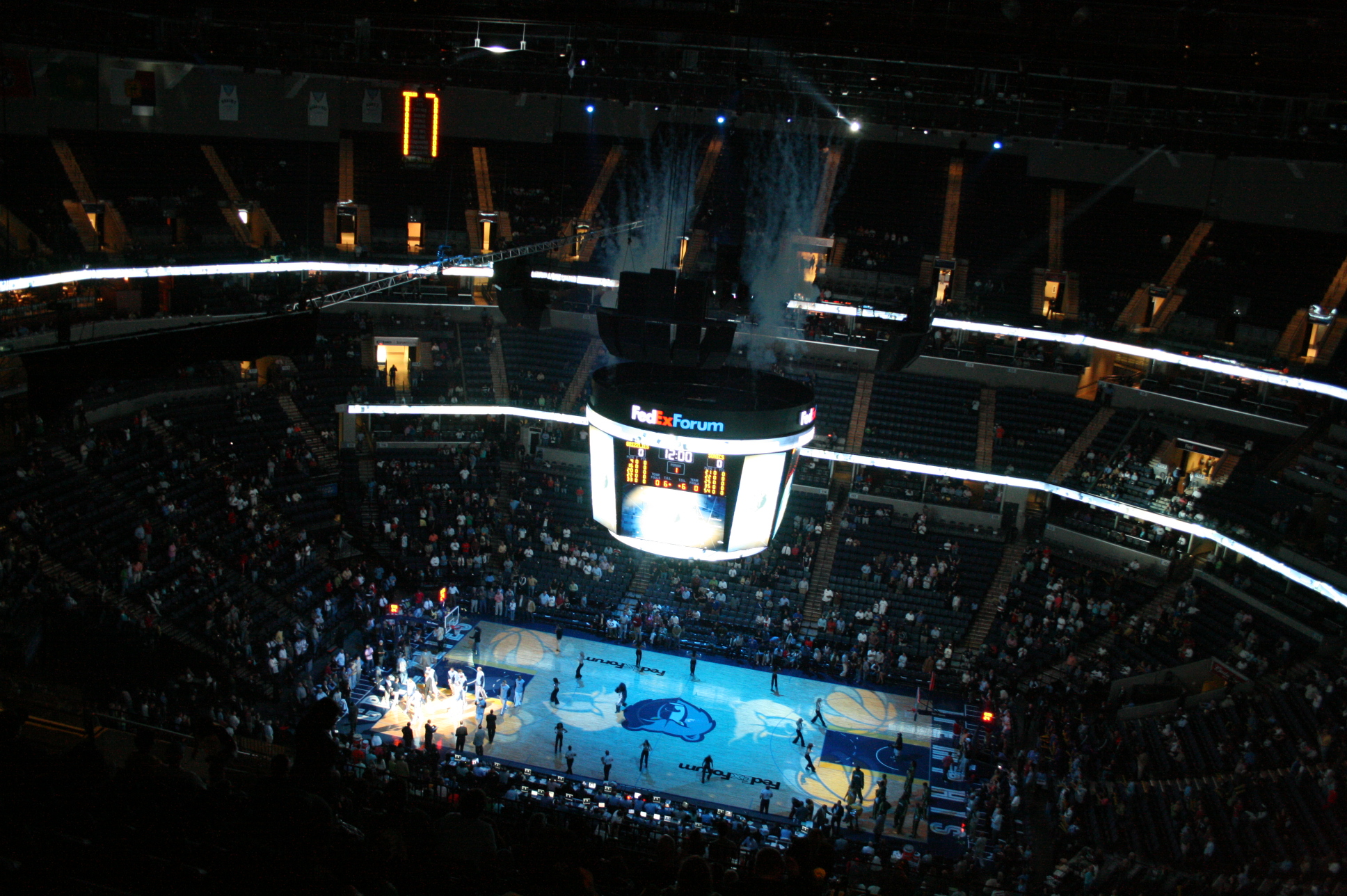
Interior view of the FedExForum

The M.A. Mortenson Company, more commonly known under its Mortenson Construction brand, is an American construction firm based in Minneapolis, Minnesota.

== Sports venues ==
Mortenson is noted as a general contractor that has built numerous sports stadiums and arenas, including U.S. Bank Stadium, Fiserv Forum, and Chase Center. As of 2014, the company had built over 150 entertainment and sports venues in the United States; by 2018, that number had grown to 170, at a valuation of $11 billion, which made Mortenson the second largest sports arena builder in the country; and by 2023, more than 230 such venues had been built, valued at $15 billion. Its most recent completed sports stadium project is the $1.9 billion Allegiant Stadium, home to the Las Vegas Raiders and UNLV Rebels football team, and slated for 2024 is a proposed $1.5 billion ballpark, also in Las Vegas, that will house the relocated Oakland Athletics.

== Renewable energy ==
Mortenson Construction is also active in the field of renewable energy, having started in 1995 with a single wind turbine.

In the area of wind energy, Mortenson received the contract for the 300 MW Blackspring Ridge Wind Project in Carmangay, Alberta, Canada for EDF-EN Canada. Mortenson installed a total of 15,000 megawatts of wind power by 2015. Mortenson built the Alamo 6 Solar and the Pearl Solar fields in Texas, with over 438,000 and 203,000 panels, respectively, atop 1,797 acres of land in Pecos County.

In 2014, with an addition of 512.9 megawatts solar power capacity, Mortenson was the second largest US company after First Solar (1,023 megawatts). One of the largest projects is the construction of the solar power plants Solar Star I and II in Rosamond, California, with a total of 597 MW of output that can generate electricity for 255,000 households.

== History ==
The company was founded in Richfield, Minnesota, in April 1954 by M. A. Mortenson. While with D'Arcy Leck, Mortenson had supervised the construction of several local schools, a veterinary building on the farm campus of the University of Minnesota, and other industrial and commercial sites.
