= Solar Star =

Photovoltaic power station in California

- Country: United States
- Location: Rosamond, California
- Coordinates: 34°49′50″N 118°23′53″W
- Status: Operational
- Construction began: 2013
- Commission date: June 19, 2015
- Owner: BHE Renewables
- Operator: SunPower

Solar farm
- Type: Flat-panel PV
- Site area: 3,200 acres (1,300 ha)

Power generation
- Nameplate capacity: 747.3 MW_{p}, 579 MW_{AC}
- Capacity factor: 32.8% (average 2017-2019)
- Annual net output: 1,663 GW·h, 520 MW·h/acre (average 2017-2019)

External links
- Website: us.sunpower.com

Solar Star is a 579-megawatt (MW_{AC}) photovoltaic power station near Rosamond, California, United States, that is operated and maintained by SunPower Services. When completed in June 2015, it was the world's largest solar farm in terms of installed capacity, using 1.7 million solar panels, made by SunPower and spread over 13 square kilometers (3,200 acres).

== Comparison to similar plants ==
Compared to other photovoltaic plants of similar size, Solar Star uses a smaller number (1.7 million) of large form-factor, high-wattage, high-efficiency, higher cost crystalline silicon modules, mounted on single axis trackers. In contrast, the Desert Sunlight Solar Farm and the Topaz Solar Farm (550 MW each) use a larger number (roughly 9 million) of smaller form-factor, lower wattage, lower efficiency, lower cost thin-film CdTe photovoltaic modules, mounted on fixed-tilt arrays and spread over a larger land area. Both approaches appear commercially viable.

There are a number of other solar photovoltaic plants nearby:

- Antelope Valley Solar Ranch (266 MW from 3.8 million thin film panels)
  34°46′N 118°25′W
- Alpine Solar (66 MW AC, thin film panels)
  34°47′37″N 118°30′44″W
- Catalina Solar Project (60 MW, thin film panels)
  34°56′N 118°20′W

== Electricity production ==
Solar Star 1's nameplate capacities are 398 MW_{dc} and 314 MW_{ac}.

Generation (MW·h) of Solar Star 1
Year	Jan	Feb	Mar	Apr	May	Jun	Jul	Aug	Sep	Oct	Nov	Dec	Total
2014			14,332	28,753	36,448	38,215	35,596	36,759	37,188	42,315	31,070	24,669	325,345
2015	34,125		69,839	84,200	97,302	93,801	99,408	97,315	81,857	63,305	55,844	44,893	821,889
2016	39,867	39,296	32,636	84,802	91,786	51,523	52,262	99,009	85,110	67,456	50,141	36,270	679,158
2017	41,432	48,667	79,574	86,741	99,308	105,230	102,026	91,375	82,008	72,837	50,163	46,171	905,532
2018	44,314	60,323	67,871	88,462	102,351	105,674	97,203	96,445	84,320	66,841	49,275	43,626	906,705
2019	40,956	50,112	70,909	78,741	82,254	100,807	100,508	100,127	82,965	74,358	49,294	31,357	862,388
2020	50,547	61,602	56,733	60,814									229,696
Average Annual Production (years 2017–2019)													891,541

Solar Star 2's nameplate capacities are 350 MW_{dc} and 266 MW_{ac}.

Generation (MW·h) of Solar Star 2
Year	Jan	Feb	Mar	Apr	May	Jun	Jul	Aug	Sep	Oct	Nov	Dec	Total
2014			14,321	19,610	30,291	42,338	44,483	52,767	52,276	50,675	40,447	32,848	380,056
2015	40,769	50,582	68,531	77,036	87,210	83,183	87,909	85,625	72,530	55,497	49,895	39,635	798,402
2016	34,065	56,385	53,776	74,427	89,089	65,376	95,256	86,438	73,226	58,390	45,752	35,668	767,848
2017	36,824	42,569	69,736	76,824	71,491	90,485	84,702	78,023	71,119	62,199	43,428	40,789	768,189
2018	38,743	53,333	60,030	78,275	90,722	90,729	81,903	81,814	74,103	59,716	42,773	37,987	790,128
2019	35,800	43,867	62,156	69,316	72,178	88,927	90,397	87,610	72,794	65,450	43,786	24,485	756,766
2020	44,125	52,918	50,630	54,672									202,345
Average Annual Production (years 2017–2019)													771,694

== See also ==
- List of photovoltaic power stations
- Solar power in California
- Tejon Ranch Radar Cross Section Facility
