= Kinects =

Residential building in the Denny Triangle neighborhood of Seattle, Washington

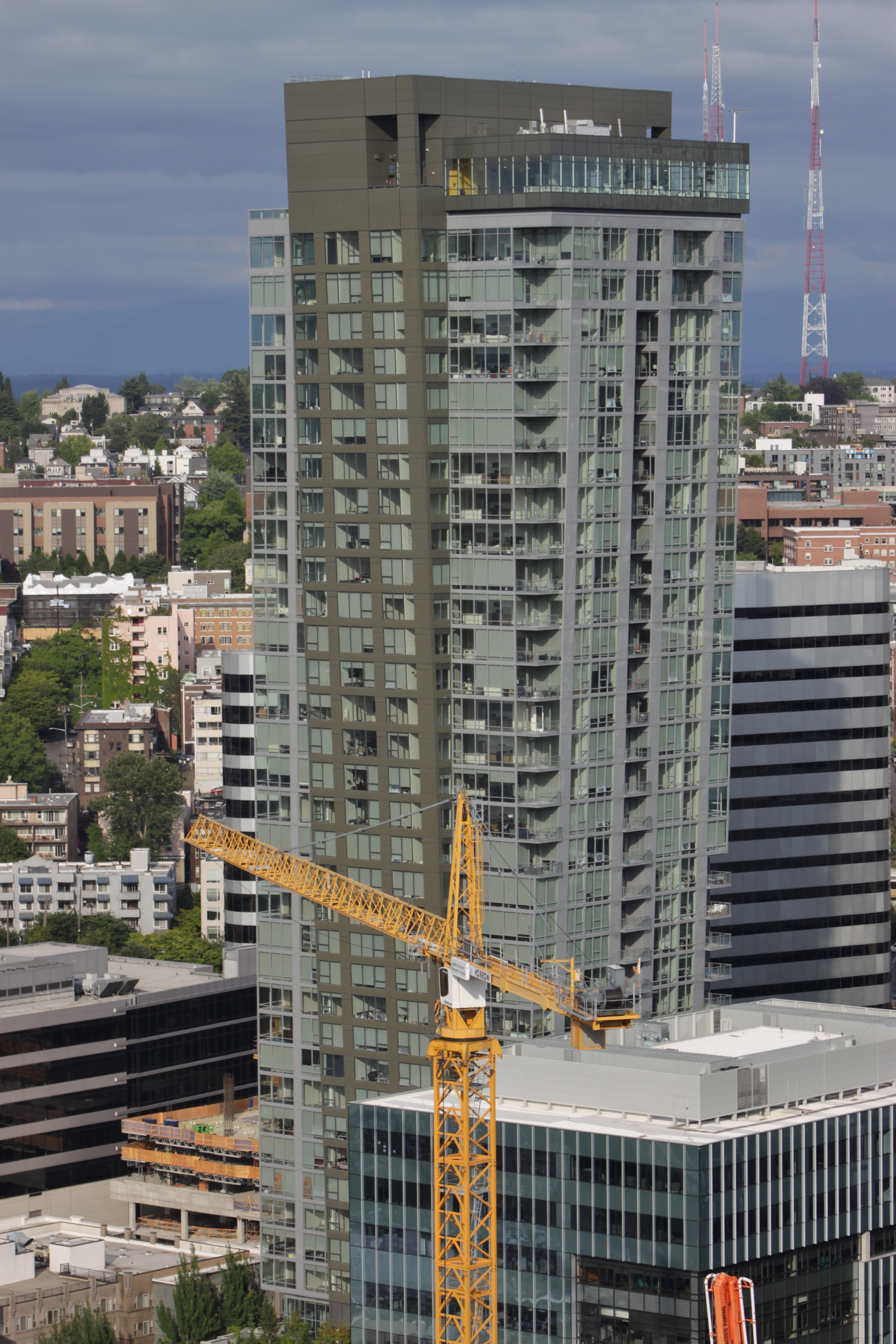

- Location within Downtown Seattle

General information
- Status: Completed
- Type: Residential
- Location: 1823 Minor Avenue; Seattle, Washington
- Coordinates: 47°37′01.39″N 122°19′53.44″W
- Construction started: 2015
- Topped-out: 2016
- Completed: July 2017
- Cost: $150 million

Height
- Height: 440 feet (130 m)

Technical details
- Floor count: 40

Design and construction
- Architecture firm: Bumgardner
- Developer: Security Properties
- Structural engineer: Cary Kopczynski & Company
- Main contractor: Andersen Construction

Other information
- Number of units: 357 apartments
- Parking: 350 spaces

Kinects is a residential building in the Denny Triangle neighborhood of Seattle, Washington. The 440-foot-tall (130 m), 40-story tower has 357 apartments and a 3,500-square-foot (330 m^{2}) restaurant at its base. It was completed in July 2017, after two years of construction. The building is located along Minor Avenue between Stewart and Howell streets, on the same block as the under construction AMLI Arc and Tilt 49 complex.

The building is wedge-shaped, with the upper floors flaring out on three sides by 6 inches (150 mm) per floor. It features a rooftop swimming pool and other amenities, including a 20-foot (6.1 m) hemlock tree.

The tower was originally approved for construction in 2008 and was to break ground the following year, but was put on hold during the Great Recession. Developer Security Properties revived the project in 2014 and began construction in February 2015. It was completed in July 2017.
