= Tejon Ranch Radar Cross Section Facility =

Radar testing site in California

- Part of Northrop Corporation
- Antelope Valley, California, U.S.
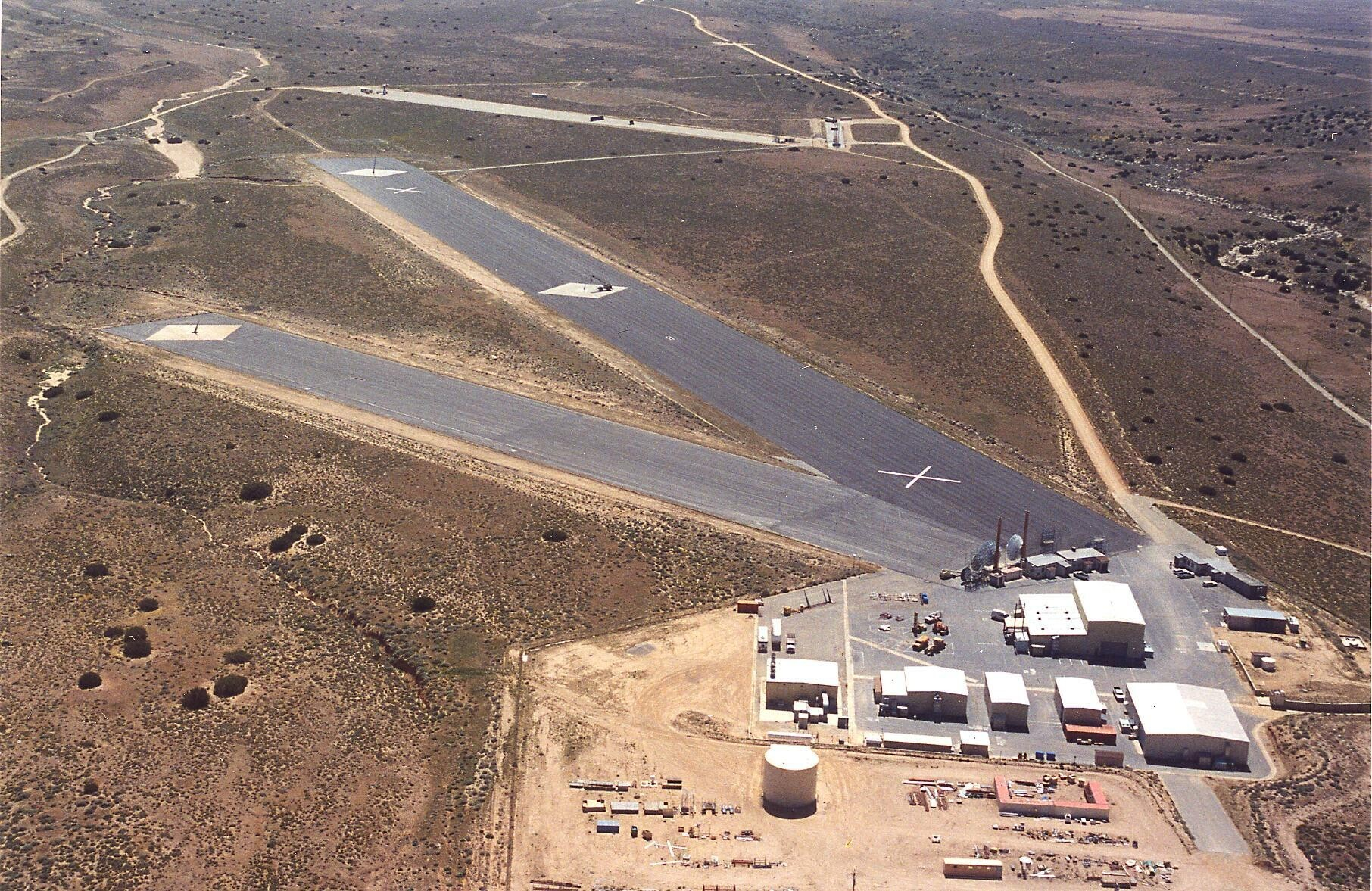
- Southward view of Tejon RCS

Site information
- Type: Radar cross-section testing range
- Controlled by: Northrop Grumman

Location
- Coordinates: 34°55′27.49″N 118°31′44.76″W
- Area: 1,400 acres

Site history
- Built: 1980s
- In use: 1980s–2011
- Fate: Closed due to nearby solar power station development

The Tejon Ranch Radar Cross Section Facility was a radar cross-section (RCS) testing site operated by Northrop Corporation—later Northrop Grumman—from the 1980s to 2011 in Antelope Valley, California, United States. Located at the southern edge of the Tehachapi Mountains, it was one of the few private outdoor ranges in the country designed to help develop stealth technology for military aircraft, including the B-2 Spirit stealth bomber. Special radar systems measured the electromagnetic reflectivity of aerospace shapes and components mounted on pedestals. Northrop Grumman closed the site after plans were approved to build nearby photovoltaic power stations that were said to interfere with radar testing.

== Background ==
Nicknamed "America's Aerospace Valley", the Antelope Valley in Southern California has long served as a hub for the development of advanced, and often classified, aerospace systems. Major private contractors with operations in the region include Northrop Grumman, Lockheed Martin, and Scaled Composites. It is also home to several key US government aerospace facilities, such as Edwards Air Force Base, the United States Air Force's Plant 42, and NASA's Neil A. Armstrong Flight Research Center. Notable milestones in the area's history include Chuck Yeager's breaking of the sound barrier in the Bell X-1 and the first landing of the Space Shuttle Columbia at Edwards Air Force Base in 1981.

== Tejon RCS facility ==
The Tejon RCS facility sits on the south edge of the Tehachapi Mountains in the remote northwest end of Antelope Valley, 35 miles west of Edwards Air Force Base. The Tejon RCS site consisted of two co-located facilities—an older northern site and a newer southern site—on a 1,400-acre parcel of land owned by Northrop—later, Northrop Grumman.

Northrop built the site to help develop stealth technologies. The Tejon RCS tested aeroforms—effectively, modular shapes that were parts of aerospace craft—to determine their radar reflectivity. The aeroforms were mounted on 50-foot tall hydraulically controlled pedestals at the far end of one of the runways for testing. Once mounted on the extended pedestals, the aeroforms would rotate as they were subjected to radar tests. Underground facilities support the research efforts.

The site was used on the B-2 stealth bomber program. Northrop also said it was involved in "several fully classified programs" related to next-generation stealth technologies. In 2003, the Air Force Research Laboratory reported that Tejon RCS, along with similar facilities nationwide, was being reviewed for compliance with updated Department of Defense standards.

In early 2008, Northrop Grumman paired television documentary producer Michael Jorgensen and the National Geographic Channel to make a documentary to determine whether the Horten Ho 229 developed by Gothaer Waggonfabrik and the Horten brothers was the first "stealth" aircraft. Northrop Grumman built a full-size non-flying reproduction of the V3, primarily made of wood, unlike the original aircraft, which had an extensive steel space-frame to which the wooden skin was bolted. After an expenditure of about US$250,000 and 2,500 man-hours, Northrop's Ho 229 reproduction was tested at Tejon RCS, where it was placed on a 15 m (49 ft) pole and exposed to electromagnetic energy sources from various angles from 100 m (330 ft), using three HF/VHF frequencies in the 20–50 MHz range. After scientific material tests and testing involving Tejon RCS, both the Smithsonian Institution and National Geographic ultimately determined the Horten aircraft as first-ever stealth aircraft to be debunked.

== Closure ==
In the 2000s, First Solar proposed to build the Antelope Valley Solar Ranch (AVSR) photovoltaic power station near Lancaster, about 12 miles south-southeast of Tejon RCS. Northrop objected, saying that the power station would interfere with its radar-signature measurements. Nevertheless, the Los Angeles County Planning Commission gave initial approval for the AVRS project on September 15, 2010.

Northrup Grumman, which had similarly, and unsuccessfully, challenged the similar Solar Star project in Rosamond in Kern County, attempted to delay the AVRS project by up to one year. The issue eventually drew the attention of the Pentagon, United States Senate, and the Governor of California. Senator Dianne Feinstein attempted to broker meetings between Northrop Grumman, First Solar, and the Pentagon. Governor Arnold Schwarzenegger lobbied in support of the Antelope Valley solar programs. Then-CEO of Northrop Grumman, Wesley G. Bush, became involved.

Both solar projects were ultimately approved and constructed. By 2011, Northrop Grumman had reportedly closed the Tejon RCS facility, leaving only one privately operated radar cross-section testing site in the Antelope Valley: a comparable facility run by Lockheed Martin in Helendale. A separate RCS range had previously been operated by McDonnell Douglas near El Mirage Dry Lake.

== See also ==
- Skunk Works – Aerospace research facility in the United States
- Solar power plants in the Mojave Desert – Electricity-generation facilities in California
- Tejon Ranch – Land owner in California, USA
