= Antelope Valley Solar Ranch =

Photovoltaic power plant in Antelope Valley, California

- Country: United States
- Location: Antelope Valley, California
- Coordinates: 34°46′30″N 118°25′30″W
- Status: Operational
- Construction began: August 2011
- Commission date: April 2014
- Construction cost: $1.36 billion ($1.83 billion in 2024 dollars)
- Owner: Constellation Energy
- Employees: 20

Solar farm
- Type: Flat-panel PV
- Site area: 2,100 acres (8.50 km^{2})

Power generation
- Units operational: 3,800,000
- Nameplate capacity: 230 MW_{AC}
- Capacity factor: 30.5% (average 2015-2017)
- Annual net output: 614 GW·h, 290 MW·h/acre

The Antelope Valley Solar Ranch 1 (AVSR1) is a 230 megawatt (MW_{AC}) photovoltaic power plant near Lancaster within Antelope Valley, in the western Mojave Desert, Southern California. It uses cadmium telluride modules made by the US thin-film manufacturer First Solar. The project was developed by First Solar and later bought by Exelon Corporation in 2011. The solar facility was fully commissioned in April 2014.

== Overview ==
In September 2011, the U.S. Department of Energy issued a $646 million loan guarantee to support the project's construction. This loan guarantee was part of the American Recovery and Reinvestment Act of 2009. The project is expected to create 350 construction jobs and 20 permanent jobs.

On February 20, 2013, the first 100 MW_{AC} came online. The plant will use approximately 3.8 million solar panels, about 20% of which will be mounted on single-axis tracking racks. When fully operational, the plant is expected to generate enough energy for 75,000 homes, displacing 140,000 tons of CO_{2} per year. The power generated by AVSR1 is being purchased by Pacific Gas and Electric Company (PG&E) under a 25-year power purchase agreement.

== Electricity production ==
Generation (MW·h) of AV Solar Ranch One
Year	Jan	Feb	Mar	Apr	May	Jun	Jul	Aug	Sep	Oct	Nov	Dec	Total
2014								60,933	56,929	52,593	42,933	30,309	243,697
2015	37,018	44,005	54,695	58,280	62,283	57,808	61,724	61,790	53,927	47,614	43,426	36,838	619,408
2016	32,935	46,208	53,436	55,097	62,375	61,868	64,535	61,770	56,081	46,491	41,614	31,884	614,294
2017	32,470	35,964	54,112	55,959	61,980	61,839	60,944	58,500	55,398	53,005	39,893	37,885	607,949
2018	36,279	44,379	48,604	57,764	63,414	61,891	58,385	59,406	55,420	48,906	38,405	33,382	606,235
2019	29,889	35,096	50,802	56,509	57,218	60,036	60,504	61,467	54,174	45,567	37,007	27,365	575,634
2020	39,053	45,448	41,055	51,660	59,820	57,073	60,313	53,436	45,572	44,493	39,195	33,014	570,132
2021	35,211	41,830	52,505	58,413	62,902	58,568	57,547	57,184	51,842	47,535	41,120	29,030	651,255
2022	41,120	43,984	53,269	58,266	62,542	59,217	60,502	57,296	50,528	49,547	40,547	29,569	606,387
2023	30,340	36,653	45,638	58,446	58,241	56,274	56,437	53,035	50,982	47,963	36,838	36,879	567,726
Average annual production (2015–2022)													606,412

== See also ==
- Solar power plants in the Mojave Desert
- Solar power in California
- List of photovoltaic power stations
- Renewable energy in the United States
- Renewable portfolio standard
- Tejon Ranch Radar Cross Section Facility
