= Willow Springs, Kern County, California =

Unincorporated community in California, United States

Willow Springs
- Unincorporated community
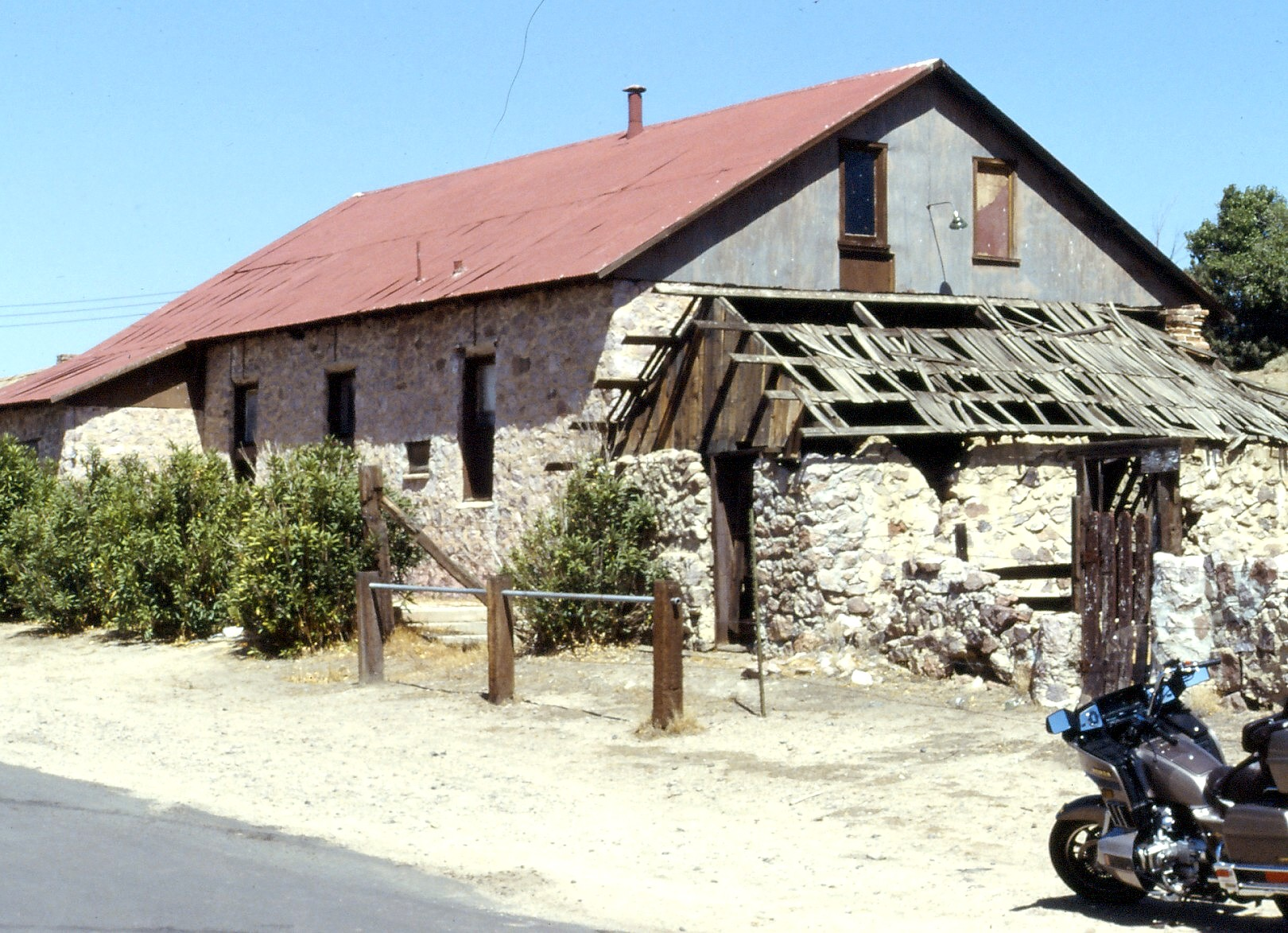
- Willow Springs Ghost Town

- Location in California Willow Springs (the United States)
- Coordinates: 34°52′42″N 118°17′48″W
- Country: United States
- State: California
- County: Kern
- Elevation: 2,523 ft (769 m)

California Historical Landmark
- Reference no.: 130

Willow Springs is a village located around a set of former springs (no longer flowing) in Kern County, California, United States. It is located off Rosamond Boulevard, 7.5 miles (12 km) west of Rosamond, at an elevation of 2,523 feet (769 m).

Willow Springs International Motorsports Park is approximately two miles east of the original village of Willow Springs.

An underground grid storage project is planned near the Whirlwind Substation.

== History ==
Willow Springs were used pre-settlement as a water source for indigenous people. The springs were visited by Father Garces, John C. Frémont, and 19th migrants on route through the Death Valley.

Willow Springs was an important stop on Los Angeles–Havilah and Los Angeles–Inyo freight and stagecoach lines. Most of the masonry buildings were built around 1900 by Ezra Hamilton, who had discovered gold in the area. A post office operated at Willow Springs from 1909 to 1918. The California state mining bureau reported in 1915 that Willow Springs was then "owned by E. M. Hamilton Estate" and had a total of 23 springs...Water contains sodium chloride, borates, and other salts. Well known summer resort. Accommodations for a number of guests."

The site is now registered as California Historical Landmark #103.

== See also ==
- California Historical Landmarks in Kern County
- California Historical Landmark
