= Redwood Solar Cluster =

Photovoltaic generating station in California

Coordinates: 35.3229°N 118.8124°W

The Redwood Solar Cluster is a 100 MW photovoltaic power station that is located in Kern County, California. The final phase, named Redwood 4, was completed in March 2018, and is located 12 miles east of downtown Bakersfield. Redwood 4 is rated at 26 MW.
