= Rosamond, California =

Unincorporated community in Kern County, California

Rosamond
- Unincorporated community Census-designated place
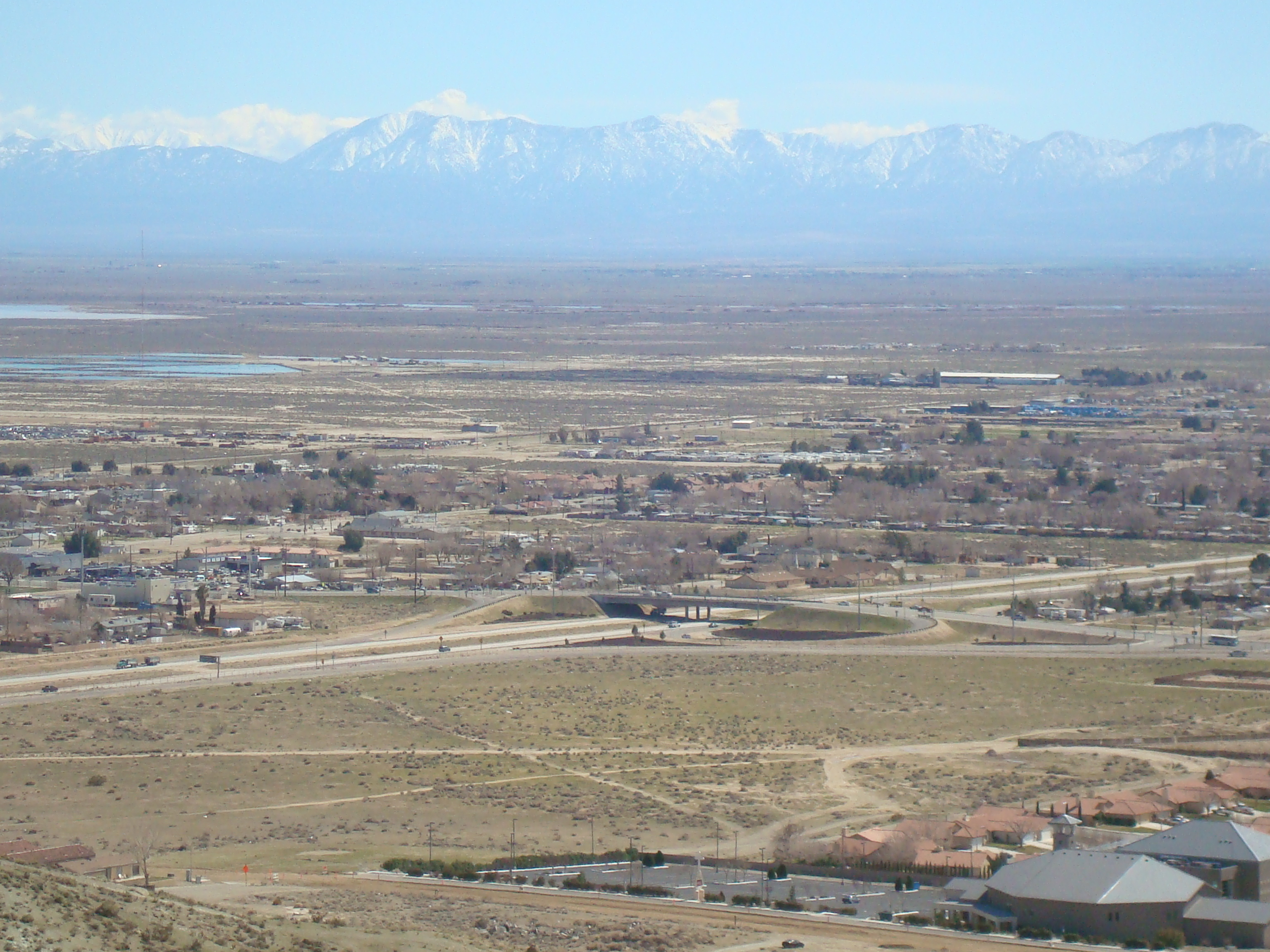
- View of part of Rosamond, CA
- Interactive map of Rosamond
- Location in California Location in the United States
- Coordinates: 34°51′51″N 118°09′48″W
- Country: United States
- State: California
- County: Kern

Government
  - Senate: Shannon Grove (R)
  - Assembly: Tom Lackey (R)
  - U. S. Congress: Vince Fong (R)

Area
  - Total: 52.335 sq mi (135.547 km^{2})
  - Land: 52.121 sq mi (134.993 km^{2})
  - Water: 0.214 sq mi (0.554 km^{2}) 0.41%
- Elevation: 2,516 ft (767 m)

Population (2020)
  - Total: 20,961
  - Density: 402.16/sq mi (155.27/km^{2})
- Time zone: UTC-8 (PST)
  - Summer (DST): UTC-7 (PDT)
- ZIP code: 93560
- Area code: 661
- FIPS code: 06-62826
- GNIS feature ID: 1661329

Rosamond is an unincorporated community in Kern County, California, United States, near the Los Angeles county line. Rosamond is part of Greater Los Angeles and is located in the Mojave Desert just north of Lancaster and Palmdale, the two largest cities in the Antelope Valley. As of the 2020 Census, Rosamond's population was 20,961. For statistical purposes, the United States Census Bureau has defined Rosamond as a census-designated place (CDP).

Rosamond is a suburban bedroom community with many residents employed by nearby Edwards Air Force Base or commuting to Los Angeles, Lancaster, and Palmdale for work. The town is approximately 15 minutes north of the Lancaster Metrolink station, providing direct access to Los Angeles Union Station in just two hours.

== History ==
Rosamond was established in 1877 as a townsite owned by the Southern Pacific Railroad; it was named for the daughter of one of the railroad's officials. The first local industries were mining and cattle. During the 1890s, gold was discovered in the area, quickly drawing miners and prospectors. After the initial boom, gold mining gradually declined, though it had a second, smaller boom during the 1930s. In 1933, Muroc Army Air Field was established some 20 miles (32 km) miles away; it was later renamed Edwards Air Force Base in honor of fallen test pilot Glenn Edwards.

The Rosamond post office opened in 1885, closed in 1887, and re-opened in 1888.

=== 1932 Ford V-8 endurance test ===
In July 1932, racing driver Eddie Pullen and his team demonstrated the endurance of the newly developed Ford V-8 engine, by driving a Ford V-8, model 18, 33,301 miles (53,593 km) in 33 days, in the Mojave desert near Rosamond. The average speed was 42 miles per hour (68 km/h) over course of 82 miles (132 km) of difficult desert terrain, where temperatures were as high as 114 °F (46 °C). Fuel consumption averaged 19.64 miles per U.S. gallon (8.35 km/L).

== Geography ==
Rosamond sits in the northern end of the Antelope Valley, the westernmost valley of the Mojave Desert. Because the elevation is 2,000 to 3,000 feet (610 to 910 m) above sea level, the area, like the other parts of the Mojave Desert region, is referred to as the High Desert. Some cities and communities within the trading area of Rosamond include Lancaster, Palmdale, Hi Vista, Roosevelt, Redman, Lake Los Angeles, Quartz Hill, and Mojave. Residents of these desert cities and unincorporated communities share Sierra Highway, Angeles Forest Highway, Angeles Crest Highway (State Route 2), and the Antelope Valley Freeway (State Route 14) for commutes to the San Fernando Valley and Los Angeles Basin in order to get to work.

Willow Springs lies west of Rosamond and was a watering hole for stagecoach travelers for generations, though its springs have since dried up. Willow Springs Raceway is nearby, which hosts a variety of motor racing events, attracting people from all over Southern California and beyond.

According to the United States Census Bureau, the CDP has a total area of 52.336 square miles (135.550 km^{2}), of which 52.121 square miles (134.993 km^{2}) is land and 0.215 square miles (0.557 km^{2}) (0.41%) is water. The Census Bureau definition of the area may not precisely correspond to the local understanding of the historical area of the community.

== Demographics ==
Historical population
Census	Pop.	Note	%±
1970	2,281		—
1980	2,869		25.8%
1990	7,430		159.0%
2000	14,349		93.1%
2010	18,150		26.5%
2020	20,961		15.5%
U.S. Decennial Census; 1860–1870 1880-1890; 1900 1910 1920; 1930 1940 1950; 1960 1970 1980; 1990 2000 2010; 2020

Rosamond first appeared as an unincorporated community in the 1970 U.S. census; and as a census-designated place in the 1980 United States census.

=== Racial and ethnic composition ===
Rosamond CDP, California – Racial and ethnic composition Note: the US Census treats Hispanic/Latino as an ethnic category. This table excludes Latinos from the racial categories and assigns them to a separate category. Hispanics/Latinos may be of any race.
Race / Ethnicity (NH = Non-Hispanic)	Pop 2000	Pop 2010	Pop 2020	% 2000	% 2010	% 2020
White alone (NH)	8,695	8,993	7,737	60.60%	49.55%	36.91%
Black or African American alone (NH)	924	1,430	2,068	6.44%	7.88%	9.87%
Native American or Alaska Native alone (NH)	127	140	144	0.89%	0.77%	0.69%
Asian alone (NH)	412	623	624	2.87%	3.43%	2.98%
Native Hawaiian or Pacific Islander alone (NH)	32	54	41	0.22%	0.30%	0.20%
Other race alone (NH)	39	42	101	0.27%	0.23%	0.48%
Mixed race or Multiracial (NH)	436	638	1,221	3.04%	3.52%	5.83%
Hispanic or Latino (any race)	3,684	6,230	9,025	25.67%	34.33%	43.06%
Total	14,349	18,150	20,961	100.00%	100.00%	100.00%

=== 2020 census ===
As of the 2020 census, Rosamond had a population of 20,961 and a population density of 402.2 inhabitants per square mile (155.3/km^{2}). The racial makeup of Rosamond was 48.1% White, 10.5% African American, 1.9% Native American, 3.3% Asian, 0.3% Pacific Islander, 19.7% from other races, and 16.2% from two or more races. Hispanic or Latino of any race were 43.1% of the population. The census reported that 99.9% of residents lived in households and 0.1% lived in non-institutionalized group quarters, with no one institutionalized; 83.7% lived in urban areas and 16.3% lived in rural areas. There were 7,111 households; 39.2% had children under the age of 18 living in them, 47.6% were married-couple households, 20.6% had a male householder with no spouse or partner present, and 23.2% had a female householder with no spouse or partner present. About 22.5% of households were one person and 7.9% had someone living alone who was 65 years of age or older. The average household size was 2.95, and there were 5,066 families (71.2% of all households). The median age was 33.2 years; 28.0% of residents were under the age of 18 and 10.3% were 65 years of age or older. For every 100 females, there were 99.2 males, and for every 100 females age 18 and over, there were 97.6 males. There were 7,608 housing units at an average density of 146.0 units per square mile (56.4 units/km^{2}), of which 7,111 (93.5%) were occupied. The homeowner vacancy rate was 1.6% and the rental vacancy rate was 7.8%; 67.7% of occupied units were owner-occupied and 32.3% were occupied by renters.

=== 2010 census ===
At the 2010 census Rosamond had a population of 18,150. The population density was 346.8 inhabitants per square mile (133.9/km^{2}). The racial makeup of Rosamond was 11,294 (62.2%) White, 1,476 (8.1%) African American, 221 (1.2%) Native American, 658 (3.6%) Asian, 66 (0.4%) Pacific Islander, 3,258 (18.0%) from other races, and 1,177 (6.5%) from two or more races. Hispanic or Latino of any race were 6,230 persons (34.3%)

The census reported that 18,145 people (100% of the population) lived in households, 5 (0%) lived in non-institutionalized group quarters, and no one was institutionalized.

There were 6,197 households, 2,603 (42.0%) had children under the age of 18 living in them, 3,254 (52.5%) were opposite-sex married couples living together, 843 (13.6%) had a female householder with no husband present, 390 (6.3%) had a male householder with no wife present. There were 432 (7.0%) unmarried opposite-sex partnerships, and 40 (0.6%) same-sex married couples or partnerships. 1,317 households (21.3%) were one person and 342 (5.5%) had someone living alone who was 65 or older. The average household size was 2.93. There were 4,487 families (72.4% of households); the average family size was 3.43.

The age distribution was 5,290 people (29.1%) under the age of 18, 1,956 people (10.8%) aged 18 to 24, 4,708 people (25.9%) aged 25 to 44, 4,716 people (26.0%) aged 45 to 64, and 1,480 people (8.2%) who were 65 or older. The median age was 32.0 years. For every 100 females, there were 100.6 males. For every 100 females age 18 and over, there were 100.2 males.

There were 6,968 housing units at an average density of 133.1 per square mile, of the occupied units 4,202 (67.8%) were owner-occupied and 1,995 (32.2%) were rented. The homeowner vacancy rate was 4.5%; the rental vacancy rate was 12.7%. 12,388 people (68.3% of the population) lived in owner-occupied housing units and 5,757 people (31.7%) lived in rental housing units.

=== 2023 ACS 5-year estimates ===
In 2023, the US Census Bureau estimated that 11.9% of the population were foreign-born. Of all people aged 5 or older, 68.8% spoke only English at home, 26.9% spoke Spanish, 2.1% spoke other Indo-European languages, 2.0% spoke Asian or Pacific Islander languages, and 0.2% spoke other languages. Of those aged 25 or older, 85.7% were high school graduates and 17.2% had a bachelor's degree.

The median household income in 2023 was $77,773, and the per capita income was $30,592. About 13.7% of families and 17.4% of the population were below the poverty line.

== Education ==
There are five schools in Rosamond: Rosamond Elementary School, West Park Elementary School, Tropico Middle School, Rosamond High School and Rare Earth High School (alternative education).

== Transportation ==
Rosamond sits along the California State Route 14, also known as the Antelope Highway, providing direct access to Los Angeles to the south and Mojave to the north.

Bus service from Rosamond to Bakersfield and Lancaster is provided by Kern Transit. The nearest Metrolink station is located about 15 minutes south in Lancaster. Expansion of the Metrolink train north to Rosamond had been discussed in a 2012 Kern County Council of Governments report.

== Notable people ==
- Kay Ryan, poet and writer
- John Quade, actor

== See also ==
- Tejon Ranch Radar Cross Section Facility
